= List of rural localities in Perm Krai =

Map of Russia with Perm Krai highlighted

This is a list of rural localities in Perm Krai. Perm Krai (Russian: Пе́рмский край, romanized: Permsky kray, IPA: [ˈpʲɛrmskʲɪj ˈkraj]) is a federal subject of Russia (a krai) that came into existence on December 1, 2005 as a result of the 2004 referendum on the merger of Perm Oblast and Komi-Permyak Autonomous Okrug. The city of Perm is the administrative center. Population: 2,635,276 (2010 Census).

== Alexandrovsky District ==
Rural localities in Alexandrovsky District:

- Bashmaki
- Baza
- Bolshaya Vilva
- Bulatovo
- Chikman
- Galka
- Garnova
- Gora
- Ivakinsky Karyer
- Kamen
- Karyer Izvestnyak
- Klestovo
- Lytvensky
- Lyuzen
- Makhneva
- Malaya Vilva
- Nizhnyaya
- Podsludnoye
- Shumkovo
- Skopkortnaya
- Sukhaya
- Taly
- Ust-Igum

== Bardymsky District ==
Rural localities in Bardymsky District:

- Akbash
- Amirovka
- Barda
- Bichurino
- Sarashi
- Yelpachikha

== Beryozovsky District ==
Rural localities in Beryozovsky District:

- Antonkovo
- Asovo
- Bartovo
- Bartym
- Basargi
- Bateriki
- Baykino
- Bereznik
- Berezovaya Gora
- Beryozovka
- Borodino
- Brod
- Demidyata
- Fedotovo
- Galashino
- Gladkovo
- Issinyayevo
- Karnaukhovo (Beryozovskoye Rural Settlement)
- Karnaukhovo (Zaboryinskoye Rural Settlement)
- Kharino
- Klyapovo
- Klychi
- Kopchikovo
- Kostyata
- Machino (Beryozovskoye Rural Settlement)
- Machino (Klyapovskoye Rural Settlement)
- Makhtyata
- Malaya Sosnovka
- Malyshi
- Markovo
- Martely
- Metalnikovo
- Misilyata
- Molyobka
- Nizhniye Isady
- Osinovo
- Palnik
- Pechatka
- Pentyurino
- Perebor
- Pirozhkovo
- Podperebor
- Podvoloshino
- Pokrovka
- Polchata
- Polushkino
- Potanitsy
- Pozdyanka
- Pronosnoye
- Puzdrino
- Ryazany
- Ryzhkovo
- Samokhino
- Saya
- Sazhino
- Selezni
- Shakva
- Shestaki
- Shishkino
- Shulgino
- Shumkovo
- Sosnovka (Asovskoye Rural Settlement)
- Sosnovka (Sosnovskoye Rural Settlement)
- Starkovo
- Taranysh
- Tarnaboyevo
- Taz Russky
- Taz Tatarsky
- Timyata
- Tokmany
- Tulumbasy
- Tuyasy
- Urai
- Uraskovo
- Vanino
- Vankino
- Verkhniye Isady
- Vilisovo
- Volodino
- Yaburovo
- Yepishata
- Yermolino
- Zaborye
- Zernino

== Bolshesosnovsky District ==
Rural localities in Bolshesosnovsky District:

- Baklushi
- Berdyshevo
- Bolshaya Sosnova
- Bolshiye Kizeli
- Burdino
- Cherknukhi
- Chernovskoye
- Chistoperevoloka
- Dolgany
- Drobiny
- Gari
- Gladky Mys
- Kiprino
- Klenovka
- Kolokolovo
- Kozhino
- Krasny Yar
- Krasnyye Gorki
- Kuzino
- Kuznetsy
- Lisya
- Lyagushino
- Lykovo
- Lyovino
- Malaya Sosnova
- Malinovka
- Malyye Kizeli
- Marasany
- Medvedevo
- Nizhny Lyp
- Osinovka
- Permyaki
- Petropavlovsk
- Pichugi
- Pikuli
- Ploska
- Polozovo
- Pozory
- Razvily
- Russky Lem
- Seletki
- Shamary
- Sivinskoye
- Solody
- Stafiyata
- Stary Lyp
- Tarakanovo
- Toykino
- Vakhrino
- Vary
- Verkh-Potka
- Verkh-Shestaya
- Yasnaya Polyana
- Yurkovo
- Yuzhny
- Zabolotovo
- Zachernaya
- Zagibovka
- Zhelnino

== Chastinsky District ==
Rural localities in Chastinsky District:

- Chastye

== Chaykovsky ==
Rural localities in Chaykovsky urban okrug:

- Alnyash
- Amaneyevo
- Bolshoy Bukor
- Bormist
- Burenka
- Dubovaya
- Foki
- Kauchuk
- Kemul
- Kirillovka
- Maly Bukor
- Markovo
- Mokhovaya
- Nekrasovo
- Opary
- Prikamsky
- Romanyata
- Rusalevka
- Sarapulka
- Sosnovo
- Stepanovo
- Uralskoye
- Vanki
- Vassyata
- Vekoshinka
- Zasechny
- Zipunovo

== Cherdynsky District ==
Rural localities in Cherdynsky District:

- Abog
- Ambor
- Bayandina
- Baydary
- Bigichi
- Bolshaya Anikovskaya
- Bolshiye Doldy
- Bolshoy Kikus
- Bondyug
- Buldyrya
- Iskor
- Istok
- Kamgort
- Kiryanova
- Kolchug
- Kolva
- Kornino
- Kupchik
- Kurgan
- Kushmangort
- Limezh
- Lobanikha
- Malyye Doldy
- Marusheva
- Nizhneye Kerchevo
- Nizhny Shaksher
- Olkhovka
- Petretsovo
- Pilva
- Pokcha
- Redikor
- Ryabinino
- Savina
- Shishigino
- Urol
- Ust-Urolka
- Valay
- Verkhneye Kerchevo
- Verkhnyaya Kolva
- Vilisova
- Vizhaikha
- Vizhay
- Yaranina
- Yezova

== Chernushinsky District ==
Rural localities in Chernushinsky District:

- Agarzinsky
- Agarzya
- Aminkay
- Ananyino
- Anastasino
- Andronovo
- Ashsha
- Atnyashka
- Azinsky
- Baranovo
- Bedryazh
- Berezovka
- Bikulka
- Bizyar
- Bogatovka
- Bolshoy Bereznik
- Bolshoy Ulyk
- Bolshoy Yug
- Bolshoye Kachino
- Brod
- Demenyovo
- Detkino
- Gari
- Ivanovka
- Kalinovka
- Kamennyye Klyuchi
- Kapkan
- Karamorka
- Kazantsevo
- Komarovo
- Korobeyniki
- Kuznetsovo
- Leninsky
- Lysaya Gora
- Malanichi
- Nikolayevsky
- Nizhny Kozmyash
- Nizhnyaya Kuba
- Olkhovka
- Orekhovaya Gora
- Osinovaya Gora
- Pavlovka
- Pokrovka
- Rakino
- Ryabki
- Sludka
- Srednyaya Kuba
- Strezh
- Sulmash
- Tanypskiye Klyuchi
- Taush
- Teklovka
- Temnoye
- Troitsk
- Trun
- Trun
- Trushniki
- Tyuy
- Ulyanovka
- Ustinovo
- Verkh-Kiga
- Verkh-Yemash
- Verkhny Kozmyash
- Vinokurovo
- Yemash-Pavlovo
- Yermiya
- Yesaul
- Yetysh
- Zverevo

== Chusovoy ==
Rural localities in Chusovoy urban okrug:

- Syola
- Uspenka

== Dobryanka ==
Rural localities in Dobryanka urban okrug:

- Divya

== Dobryansky District ==
Rural localities in Dobryansky District:

- 29 km
- 5 km
- Adishchevo
- Batashata
- Berdnikovshchina
- Besmelyata
- Besovo
- Bobki (settlement)
- Bobki (village)
- Bobovaya
- Bolshoye Spitsino
- Bolshoye Zapolye
- Bor-Lyonva
- Borodkino
- Borovkovo
- Boyanovo
- Chyolva
- Fominka
- Gari
- Golubyata
- Gorodishche
- Gory
- Gryaznukha
- Gurino
- Ivanovka
- Kamsky
- Kanyuki
- Klyuchi
- Komarovo
- Konets Gor
- Kononovo
- Konstantinovka
- Korolevo
- Krasnaya Sludka
- Krasnoye
- Krutikovo
- Kukhtym (railway station settlement)
- Kukhtym (settlement)
- Kuligino
- Kulikovo
- Kunya
- Kyzh (settlement)
- Kyzh (village)
- Lipovo
- Lunezhki
- Lyabovo
- Merkushevo
- Milkovo
- Mokhovo
- Monastyr
- Mutnaya (settlement)
- Mutnaya (village)
- Nekhayka
- Nikulino
- Nikulyata
- Nizhneye Krasnoye
- Nizhneye Zadolgoye
- Nizhny Lukh
- Oktyabrsky
- Olkhovka
- Omelichi
- Pakhnino
- Palniki
- Patraki
- Penki
- Pomortsevo
- Rassokhi
- Rodniki
- Rogovik
- Shemeti
- Shkaryata
- Sofronyata
- Tabory (selo)
- Tabory (settlement)
- Talitsa
- Tikhaya
- Traktovy
- Tulka
- Tyus
- Ust-Shalashnaya
- Vetlyany
- Vilva
- Visim
- Yaganyata
- Yarino (settlement)
- Yarino (village)
- Yaroslavshchina
- Yelniki
- Yershovka
- Zaborye
- Zakharovtsy
- Zalesnaya
- Zavozhik
- Zvony

== Gaynsky District ==
Rural localities in Gaynsky District:

- Ankudinovo
- Bazuyevo
- Chazhegovo
- Churtan
- Danilovo
- Gayny
- Imasy
- Isayevo
- Kasimovka
- Kebraty
- Keros
- Kharino
- Krasnoyary
- Krasny Yar
- Lel
- Lunym
- Modorobo
- Monastyr
- Nikonovo
- Onyl
- Pugvin Mys
- Serebryanka
- Seyva
- Shipitsino
- Shordyn
- Sosnovaya
- Tiunovo
- Tyla
- Ust-Chukurya
- Ust-Chyornaya
- Ust-Veslyana
- Vaskino
- Verkhny Budym
- Verkhnyaya Staritsa
- Yelevo
- Zhemchuzhny

== Gornozavodsky District ==
Rural localities in Gornozavodsky District:

- Biser
- Koyva
- Laki
- Srednyaya Usva
- Ust-Koyva
- Ust-Tiskos
- Ust-Tyrym
- Vilva
- Vizhay
- Yevropeyskaya

== Gremyachinsky ==
Rural localities in Gremyachinsky urban okrug:

- Baseg
- Bezgodovo
- Shumikhinsky
- Yubileyny
- Zagotovka

== Gubakhinsky ==
Rural localities in Gubakhinsky urban okrug:

- Klyuchi
- Nagornsky
- Parma
- Shestaki

== Ilyinsky District ==
Rural localities in Ilyinsky District:

- Ilyinsky
- Ivanovskoye
- Podbornaya

== Karagaysky District ==
Rural localities in Karagaysky District:

- Karagay
- Kotelniki
- Kozmodemyansk
- Mendeleyevo
- Nizhny Kushcher
- Obvinsk
- Yarino

== Kishertsky District ==
Rural localities in Kishertsky District:

- Andreyevo
- Borovchata
- Brazhata
- Burylovo
- Byrma
- Chechenino
- Chernoyarskaya Odina
- Chyorny Yar
- Dom otkykha 'Krasny Yar'
- Fomichi
- Gari
- Garino
- Ilyata
- Kordon
- Korsaki
- Lebedyata
- Lyok
- Makaryata
- Mazuyevka
- Mecha
- Medvedovo
- Molyobka
- Nizkoye
- Osintsevo
- Parunovo
- Pashyovo
- Petryata
- Posad
- Seda
- Shamaryata
- Shumkovo
- Spaso-Barda
- Sukhoy Log
- Ust-Kishert
- Verkhnyaya Opalikha
- Verkhnyaya Solyanka
- Yevdokino

== Kizel ==
Rural localities in Kizel urban okrug:

- Severny-Kospashsky
- Shakhta

== Kochyovsky District ==
Rural localities in Kochyovsky District:

- Abramovka
- Akilovo
- Arkhipovo
- Bazhovo
- Belenkovo
- Bogolyubovo
- Bolshaya Kocha
- Bolshoy Palnik
- Borino
- Buzhdym
- Demidovka
- Durovo
- Dyoma
- Dyomino
- Gaintsevo
- Gordeyevo
- Khazovo
- Kochyovo
- Krasnaya Kurya
- Kukushka
- Kuzmyno
- Kyshka
- Lobozovo
- Lyagayevo
- Mara-Palnik
- Maraty
- Maskal
- Mitino
- Moskvino
- Oktyabrsky
- Oshovo
- Otopkovo
- Oy-Pozhum
- Palkoyag
- Parmaylovo
- Pelym
- Petrushino
- Petukhovo
- Polozayka
- Proshino
- Puzym
- Pystogovo
- Salnikovo
- Sepol
- Serva
- Shansherevo
- Shipitsino
- Shorsha
- Sizovo
- Slepoyevo
- Syulkovo
- Tarasovo
- Tashka
- Tubyzovo
- Urya
- Urzha
- Ust-Onolva
- Ust-Silayka
- Ust-Yancher
- Vaskino
- Vershinino
- Vezhayka
- Vorobyovo
- Yukseyevo
- Zapoltsevo
- Zuyevo
- Zyryanovo

== Kosinsky District ==
Rural localities in Kosinsky District:

- Abramovo
- Bachmanovo
- Baranovo
- Chazyovo
- Chirkovo
- Churaki
- Dederuy
- Demidovo
- Denino
- Fomichevo
- Gavrikovo
- Gorki
- Gortlud
- Grishkino
- Karchyoy
- Kirshino
- Kordon
- Kosa
- Krasnobay
- Krivtsy
- Levichi
- Loch-Say
- Lyampino
- Maskali
- Mys
- Natyaino
- Nesoli
- Nizhnyaya Kosa
- Novaya Svetlitsa
- Novoye Gushchino
- Novozhilovo
- Odan
- Panino
- Peklayb
- Podgora
- Podyachevo
- Poroshevo
- Puksib
- Pyatigory
- Pydosovo
- Solym
- Sosnovka
- Sredneye Bachmanovo
- Staroye Gushchino
- Trifanovo
- Ust-Kosa
- Varysh
- Verkh-Lel
- Voyvyl
- Zinkovo

== Krasnovishersky District ==
Rural localities in Krasnovishersky District:

- Akchim
- Antipina
- Arefina
- Bakhari
- Berezovaya Staritsa
- Boloto
- Bulatovo
- Bychina
- Danilov Lug
- Grishina
- Gubdor
- Ivachina
- Konovalova
- Kotomysh
- Mutikha
- Naberezhny
- Nizhneye Zapolye
- Nizhnyaya Bychina
- Nizhnyaya Yazva
- Oralovo
- Parshakova
- Rategova
- Romanikha
- Severny Kolchim
- Seysmopartiya
- Simanova
- Storozhevaya
- Sypuchi
- Sysoyeva
- Talavol
- Tsepel
- Ust-Yazva
- Vankova
- Vaya
- Vels
- Verkh-Yazva
- Verkhneye Zapolye
- Visherogorsk
- Volynka
- Yaborova
- Yegorova
- Zagovorukha
- Zolotanka

== Kudymkarsky District ==
Rural localities in Kudymkarsky District:

- Alekova
- Alexandrova
- Alexeyevka
- Amonova
- Ananyeva
- Andriyanova
- Andropova
- Anikina
- Antonova
- Arazayeva
- Arefyeva
- Arkhipova
- Artamonova
- Bagrova
- Balkachi
- Baranova (Oshibskoye Rural Settlement)
- Baranova (Stepanovskoye Rural Settlement)
- Batina
- Beloyevo
- Berezovka
- Bolka
- Bolshaya Serva
- Bolshaya Sidorova
- Borisova
- Bormotova
- Boyarskaya
- Brazhkina
- Bryushinina
- Burlova
- Buslayeva
- Bystry
- Chakileva
- Chashchilova
- Chaverina
- Cheremnova
- Chukyleva
- Danshina
- Demina
- Demino
- Derskanova
- Devina
- Dodonova
- Erna
- Fadeyeva
- Fedotova
- Filayeva
- Gabova
- Galina
- Galyukova
- Ganina
- Gavrilova
- Gavrukova
- Gayshor
- Golubkova
- Gordina
- Grishuneva
- Gurina (Verkh-Invenskoye Rural Settlement)
- Gurina (Yogvinskoye Rural Settlement)
- Gyrova
- Ilyichi
- Isakova
- Ivankova
- Ivashkova
- Ivukova
- Kalinina (Leninskoye Rural Settlement)
- Kalinina (Verkh-Invenskoye Rural Settlement)
- Kamashor
- Kanamova
- Karbas
- Karp-Vaskina
- Karpina
- Kazarina
- Kekur (Leninskoye Rural Settlement)
- Kekur (Stepanovskoye Rural Settlement)
- Kharina
- Kharinova
- Kiprusheva
- Kirshina
- Klyuch-Mys
- Klyuchi
- Kokorina
- Konanova
- Konina
- Konshina
- Korchevnya
- Koroleva
- Koshtanova
- Kosogor (Beloyevskoye Rural Settlement)
- Kosogor (Leninskoye Rural Settlement)
- Kosva
- Kovylyaeva
- Kozhina
- Kozlova (Beloyevskoye Rural Settlement)
- Kozlova (Yogvinskoye Rural Settlement)
- Kukshinova
- Kurdyukova
- Kuva
- Kuzmina
- Kuzolova
- Kuzva
- Leleva
- Leninsk
- Levina (Verkh-Invenskoye Rural Settlement)
- Levina (Yogvinskoye Rural Settlement)
- Loginova
- Lopatina
- Lopvador
- Lyachkanova
- Malakhova (Beloyevskoye Rural Settlement)
- Malakhova (Oshibskoye Rural Settlement)
- Malaya Serva
- Malaya Sidorova
- Maltseva
- Martina
- Martyusheva
- Maximova
- Mazunina
- Mechkor
- Melekhina
- Minyadyn
- Mironova
- Mish-Piyan
- Miteva
- Mizhuyeva
- Molova
- Mosheva
- Moskvina
- Muchaki
- Mukmarova
- Nelsina
- Nepina
- Nesterova
- Nikolichi
- Novaya Shlyapina
- Novoselova
- Novoselovsky Lesouchastok
- Novozhilova
- Oshib
- Oshova
- Osipova (Beloyevskoye Rural Settlement)
- Osipova (Oshibskoye Rural Settlement)
- Ostapova
- Otevo
- Paleva (Beloyevskoye Rural Settlement)
- Paleva (Verkh-Invenskoye Rural Settlement)
- Panya
- Panyashor
- Parfenova (Leninskoye Rural Settlement)
- Parfenova (Verkh-Invenskoye Rural Settlement)
- Parshakova
- Patrukova
- Perkova
- Pershina
- Peshnigort
- Petukhova
- Pidayeva
- Pikhtovka
- Piter
- Pleshkova
- Plotnikova
- Pochkina
- Podgora
- Podvolochnaya
- Polva
- Ponosova
- Porskokova
- Proneva
- Pronina (Leninskoye Rural Settlement)
- Pronina (Verkh-Invenskoye Rural Settlement)
- Pronina (Yogvinskoye Rural Settlement)
- Pruddor
- Putoyeva
- Pyatina
- Rakshina
- Razina
- Rektanova
- Rocheva
- Rodeva
- Rodina (Leninskoye Rural Settlement)
- Rodina (Yogvinskoye Rural Settlement)
- Romanova
- Sadovaya
- Safonkova
- Samkovo
- Sanyukova
- Saranina
- Savina (Oshibskoye Rural Settlement)
- Savina (Yogvinskoye Rural Settlement)
- Seleva
- Senina (Beloyevskoye Rural Settlement)
- Senina (Verkh-Invenskoye Rural Settlement)
- Senkashor
- Sergeyeva
- Sergina
- Shaburova
- Shadrina
- Sharvol
- Shaydyrova
- Shipitsyna
- Shoryyv
- Sidorova (Leninskoye Rural Settlement)
- Sidorova (Verkh-Invenskoye Rural Settlement)
- Sidorshor
- Silina (Beloyevskoye Rural Settlement)
- Silina (Verkh-Invenskoye Rural Settlement)
- Sizeva
- Sludina
- Sordva
- Spasova
- Staraya Kuzva
- Staraya Shlyapina
- Stepanova
- Sylvozh
- Systerova
- Syuz-Pozya
- Tarasova
- Tarova
- Taskayeva
- Tebenkova
- Tikhonyata
- Tikhy
- Trapezniki
- Tretyeva
- Trosheva (Beloyevskoye Rural Settlement)
- Trosheva (Verkh-Invenskoye Rural Settlement)
- Tsybyan
- Uchat-Zon
- Uchkhoz
- Vaganova
- Valkova
- Vas-Palnik
- Vaseva
- Vasilyevka
- Vaskina Gar
- Vasyukova (Beloyevsky Selsoviet)
- Vasyukova (Kuvinsky Selsoviet)
- Vazh-Chigas
- Vazh-Palnik
- Vazh-Pashnya
- Velva-Baza
- Verkh-Buzhdom
- Verkh-Inva
- Verkh-Yusva
- Vesyoly Mys
- Vezhayka
- Vil-Chigas
- Vil-Chukyleva
- Vil-Konanova
- Vil-Shulay
- Vil-Zhukova
- Vizyay
- Vnukova
- Vyrova
- Yagodina
- Yakina
- Yarasheva
- Yegichi
- Yegorova
- Yepanova
- Yeremushkina
- Yermakova
- Yershova
- Yevdokimova
- Yevsina
- Yogva
- Yunga
- Zakharova
- Zapolye (Beloyevskoye Rural Settlement)
- Zapolye (Verkh-Invenskoye Rural Settlement)
- Zarechny Peshnigort
- Zhak-Klyuch
- Zhivyye
- Zyulganova

== Kungursky District ==
Rural localities in Kungursky District:

- Bym
- Kalinino
- Komsomolsky
- Shadeyka

== Kuyedinsky District ==
Rural localities in Kuyedinsky District:

- Alnyash
- Baraban
- Bolshaya Usa
- Bolshiye Kusty
- Bolshoy Gondyr
- Bolshoy Talmaz
- Gozhan
- Kalmiyary
- Kirga
- Kitryum
- Kuyeda
- Novy Shagirt
- Oshya
- Soyuz
- Stary Shagirt
- Tsentralnaya Usadba 3-go Goskonezavoda
- Udmurt-Shagirt
- Verkh-Gondyr
- Verkhyaya Sava

== Lysva ==
Rural localities in Lysva urban okrug:

- Kyn
- Kyn
- Nevidimka

== Nytvensky District ==
Rural localities in Nytvensky District:

- Mokino
- Novokoshkino

== Okhansky District ==
Rural localities in Okhansky District:

- Ostrozhka

== Oktyabrsky District ==
Rural localities in Oktyabrsky District:

- Samarova
- Shchuchye Ozero
- Yenapayevo

== Ordinsky District ==
Rural localities in Ordinsky District:

- Orda

== Permsky District ==
Rural localities in Permsky District:

- Alebastrovo
- Alexiki
- Anikino
- Bakharevka
- Balandino
- Bashkultayevo
- Baskiye
- Baybolovka
- Bereg Kamy (Kondratovskoye Rural Settlement)
- Bereg Kamy (Yugo-Kamskoye Rural Settlement)
- Bereznik
- Berezniki
- Bershet
- Bizyar
- Boldino
- Bolgary
- Bolshakino
- Bolshaya Mos
- Bolshoy Burtym
- Bolshoye Savino
- Brody
- Bulanki
- Bykovka
- Byrma
- Chebaki
- Chelyaba
- Chuvaki
- Chyornaya
- Denisyata
- Deriby
- Dikaya Gar
- Dubrovo
- Dvortsovaya Sludka
- Fedotovo
- Ferma
- Fomichi
- Froly
- Gamovo
- Gamy
- Gari
- Garyushki
- Glushata
- Gora
- Gorbunovo
- Gorshki
- Gorskaya
- Gribanovo
- Gruzdi
- Gusyata
- Kachka
- Kanabekovo
- Kapidony
- Karasye
- Kashino
- Kasimovo
- Kazantsy
- Kety
- Khokhlovka
- Khristoforovka
- Kichanovo
- Klestyata
- Klyuchi
- Klyuchiki
- Kochkino
- Koltsovo
- Kolyady
- Komarovo
- Kommuna
- Kondratovo
- Kosogory
- Kosoturikha
- Kostaryata
- Koyanovo
- Kozybayevo
- Krasava
- Krasny Voskhod
- Krokhovo
- Kukushtan
- Kuliki
- Kultayevo
- Kurashim
- Lesouchastok 831
- Lipaki
- Lobanovo
- Lozhki
- Lugovaya (Rozhdestvenskoye Rural Settlement)
- Lugovaya (Ust-Kachkinskoye Rural Settlement)
- Lyady
- Malaya
- Maloye Savino
- Maly Burtym
- Malyye Klestyata
- Martyanovo
- Merkushevo
- Mishurna
- Mokino
- Molokovo
- Morgali
- Moskvyata
- Mostovaya (Mostovskoye Rural Settlement)
- Mostovaya (Sylvenskoye Rural Settlement)
- Mulyanka
- Murashi
- Mysy
- Nazarovo
- Nestyukovo
- Nikulino
- Nizhniye Mully
- Nizhny Palnik
- Novoilyinskoye
- Novy
- Odina
- Ogryzkovo
- Oktyabrsky
- Olkhovka (settlement)
- Olkhovka (village)
- Osentsy
- Pany
- Pashnya
- Pazderino
- Pesyanka
- Petrovka
- Petryakhino
- Petushki
- Pishchalnikovo
- Plishki
- Poludennaya
- Polyudovo
- Protasy
- Rassolino
- Rassolnaya
- Rastyagayevo
- Rozhdestvenskoye
- Russkoye Pole
- Sakmary
- Savenki
- Sevastyany
- Shilovo
- Shirpy
- Shondikha
- Shugurovka
- Shulgino
- Shumki
- Shuvayata
- Sibir
- Simonki
- Skobelevka
- Sofrony
- Sokol
- Staroverovo
- Stashkovo
- Stepanovo
- Strashnaya
- Sukhaya
- Sukho-Platoshino
- Sukhobizyarka
- Suzdaly
- Sylva
- Syro-Platoshino
- Taranki
- Tayozhny
- Tishkino
- Troitsa
- Tupitsa
- Ust-Kachka
- Ust-Kurashim
- Ust-Pizya
- Ust-Tary
- Ustinovo
- Vanyuki
- Vashury
- Vasilyevka
- Vazelyata
- Verkh-Rechka
- Verkh-Rechki
- Verkh-Syra
- Verkhnyaya Khokhlovka
- Verkhnyaya Rassolnaya
- Yakunchiki
- Yanychi
- Yasyri
- Yermashi
- Yermozy
- Yezhi
- Yug
- Yugo-Kamsky
- Zaboloto
- Zaborye
- Zagrishinskoye
- Zamarayevo
- Zamulyanka
- Zaosinovo
- Zaozerye (Khokhlovskoye Rural Settlement)
- Zaozerye (Ust-Kachkinskoye Rural Settlement)
- Zapolye
- Zarechnaya (Gamovskoye Rural Settlement)
- Zarechnaya (Yugo-Kamskoye Rural Settlement)
- Zavedeniye
- Zaykovo
- Zhebrei
- Zhilya
- Zubki

== Sivinsky District ==
Rural localities in Sivinsky District:

- Severny Kommunar
- Siva

== Solikamsky District ==
Rural localities in Solikamsky District:

- Basim
- Chashkina
- Chyornoye
- Geologorazvedka
- Gorodishche
- Kasib
- Krasny Bereg
- Lyzib
- Maloye Gorodishche
- Nikino
- Nizhneye Moshevo
- Osokino
- Polovodovo
- Rodniki
- Sim
- Tokhtuyeva
- Tyulkino
- Urolka
- Usovsky
- Verkhneye Moshevo
- Vilva
- Volodino
- Zaton

== Suksunsky District ==
Rural localities in Suksunsky District:

- Kamenka
- Klyuchi
- Pepelyshi
- Sasykovo

== Uinsky District ==
Rural localities in Uinsky District:

- Ishteryaki
- Uinskoye

== Usolsky District ==
Rural localities in Usolsky District:

- Romanovo
- Taman
- Zheleznodorozhny

== Vereshchaginsky District ==
Rural localities in Vereshchaginsky District:

- Ageyevo
- Andronovka
- Boroduli
- Borodulino
- Borshchyovtsy
- Buzynyata
- Cherepanovo
- Denisovka
- Durovo
- Fedyashino
- Gavryukhino
- Gudyri
- Kalinichi
- Katayevo
- Klyuchi
- Kozhevniki
- Krutiki
- Kukety
- Kungur
- Kuzminka
- Kuznetsovo
- Lazarevo
- Leushkanovo
- Loginovo
- Lukino
- Martely
- Minino
- Moskvyata
- Nizhniye Garevskiye
- Nizhniye Khomyaki
- Oshchepkovo
- Posad
- Putino
- Putino
- Pyankovo
- Ryabiny
- Saltykovo
- Sarachi
- Sepych
- Shavrino
- Sidoryata
- Sivkovo
- Sobolyata
- Strizhi
- Subbotniki
- Tolkovyata
- Tyurikovo
- Volegi
- Volegovo
- Zakharyata
- Zapolye
- Zaytsy

== Yelovsky District ==
Rural localities in Yelovsky District:

- Bryukhovo
- Druzhnaya
- Pankovo
- Plishkino
- Shuldikha
- Yelovo
- Zonovo

== Yurlinsky District ==
Rural localities in Yurlinsky District:

- Berezova
- Bolshaya Polovina
- Bukreyeva
- Chugaynov Khutor
- Chuzhya
- Demidova
- Dubrovka
- Ivanovskaya
- Kelich
- Komsomolsky
- Pestereva
- Podkina
- Pozh
- Syuzva
- Titova
- Ust-Berezovka
- Ust-Zula
- Verkhnyaya Lobanova
- Vyatchina
- Yeloga
- Yum
- Yurla

== Yusvinsky District ==
Rural localities in Yusvinsky District:

- Arkhangelskoye
- Artamonovo
- Asanovo
- Bazhino
- Galyasher
- Kharino
- Kupros
- Maykor
- Pochasher
- Pozhva
- Timino
- Yusva
- Zhiginovo

== See also ==
- Lists of rural localities in Russia
