= Zamarayevo =

Zamarayevo Замараево
- Village
- Location within Perm Krai Location within Russia
- Coordinates: 57°55′N 56°14′E
- Country: Russia
- Region: Perm Krai
- District: Permsky District
- Time zone: UTC+5:00

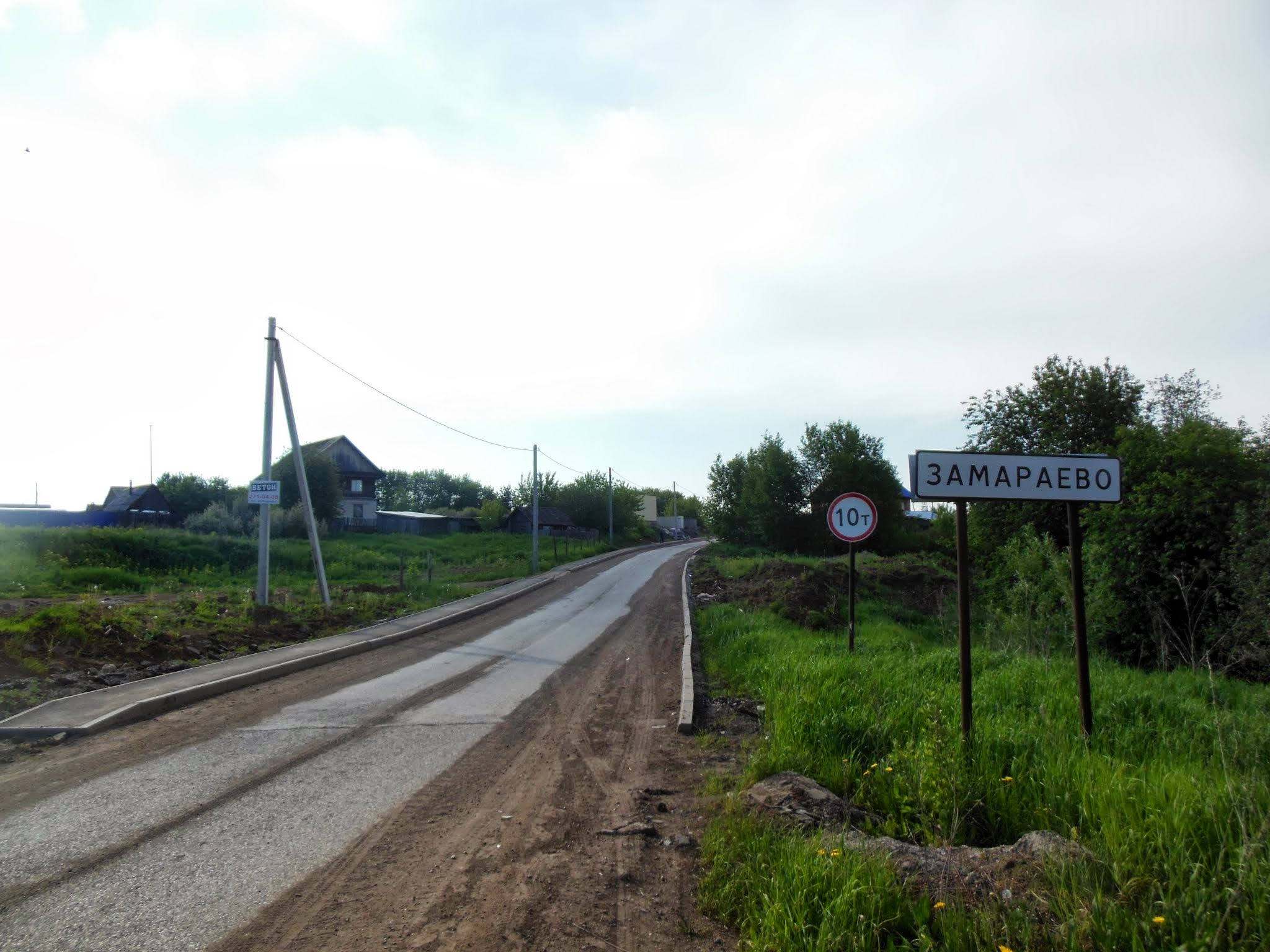
Sign in Russian saying Zamarayevo

Zamarayevo (Russian: Замараево) is a rural locality (a village) in Frolovskoye Rural Settlement, Permsky District, Perm Krai, Russia. The population was 215 as of 2010. There are 7 streets.

== Geography ==
Zamarayevo is located 12 km south of Perm (the district's administrative centre) by road. Shuvayata is the nearest rural locality.
