= Kalinina (Verkh-Invenskoye Rural Settlement), Kudymkarsky District, Perm Krai =

Kalinina Калинина
- Village
- Location within Perm Krai Location within Russia
- Coordinates: 58°56′N 54°18′E
- Country: Russia
- Region: Perm Krai
- District: Kudymkarsky District
- Time zone: UTC+5:00

Kalinina (Russian: Калинина) is a rural locality (a village) in Verkh-Invenskoye Rural Settlement, Kudymkarsky District, Perm Krai, Russia. The population was 12 as of 2010.

== Geography ==
It is located 27 km west from Kudymkar.
