= Alnyash, Tchaikovsky, Perm Krai =

Alnyash Альняш
- Selo
- Flag

- Location within Perm Krai Location within Russia
- Coordinates: 56°44′N 54°44′E
- Country: Russia
- Region: Perm Krai
- District: Chaykovsky
- Time zone: UTC+5:00

Alnyash (Russian: Альняш) is a rural locality (a selo) and the administrative center of Alnyashinskoye Rural Settlement, Chaykovsky, Perm Krai, Russia. The population was 805 as of 2010. There are 6 streets.

== Geography ==
Alnyash is located 47 km east of Chaykovsky. Kirillovka is the nearest rural locality.
