= Ust-Kurashim =

Ust-Kurashim Усть-Курашим
- Village
- Location within Perm Krai Location within Russia
- Coordinates: 57°37′N 56°35′E
- Country: Russia
- Region: Perm Krai
- District: Permsky District
- Time zone: UTC+5:00

Ust-Kurashim (Russian: Усть-Курашим) is a rural locality (a village) in Platoshinskoye Rural Settlement, Permsky District, Perm Krai, Russia. The population was 21 as of 2010. There are five streets.

== Geography ==
Ust-Kurashim is located 58 km south of Perm (the district's administrative centre) by road. Platoshino is the nearest rural locality.
