= Safonkova =

Safonkova Сафонкова
- Village
- Location within Perm Krai Location within Russia
- Coordinates: 58°55′N 54°31′E
- Country: Russia
- Region: Perm Krai
- District: Kudymkarsky District
- Time zone: UTC+5:00

Safonkova (Russian: Сафонкова) is a rural locality (a village) in Stepanovskoye Rural Settlement, Kudymkarsky District, Perm Krai, Russia. The population was 61 as of 2010.

== Geography ==
It is located 11 km south-west from Kudymkar.
