= Kyn (settlement) =

Kyn Кын
- Settlement
- Location within Perm Krai Location within Russia
- Coordinates: 57°47′N 58°30′E
- Country: Russia
- Region: Perm Krai
- District: Lysva
- Time zone: UTC+5:00

Kyn (Russian: Кын) is a rural locality (a settlement) in Lysva, Perm Krai, Russia. The population was 1,949 as of 2010. There are 22 streets.

It arose at the beginning of the 20th century as a settlement near the railway station. The name is given for the nearby rural locality (selo) of Kyn.

== Geography ==
Kyn is located 75 km southeast of Lysva (the district's administrative centre) by road.
