= Zasechny =

Zasechny Засечный
- Village
- Location within Perm Krai Location within Russia
- Coordinates: 56°51′N 54°26′E
- Country: Russia
- Region: Perm Krai
- District: Chaykovsky
- Time zone: UTC+5:00

Zasechny (Russian: Засечный) is a rural locality (a village) in Chaykovsky, Perm Krai, Russia. The population was 251 as of 2010. There are 15 streets.

== Geography ==
Zasechny is located 40 km northeast of Chaykovsky. Mokhovaya is the nearest rural locality.
