= Khokhlovka (selo) =

Khokhlovka Хохловка
- Selo
- Location within Perm Krai Location within Russia
- Coordinates: 58°16′N 56°14′E
- Country: Russia
- Region: Perm Krai
- District: Permsky District
- Time zone: UTC+5:00

Khokhlovka (Russian: Хохловка) is a rural locality (a selo) in Khokhlovskoye Rural Settlement, Permsky District, Perm Krai, Russia. The population was 12 as of 2010. There are 4 streets.

== Geography ==
Khokhlovka is located 46 km north of Perm (the district's administrative centre) by road. Verkhnyaya Khokhlovka is the nearest rural locality.
