= Khristoforovka =

Khristoforovka Христофоровка
- Village
- Location within Perm Krai Location within Russia
- Coordinates: 58°12′N 56°17′E
- Country: Russia
- Region: Perm Krai
- District: Permsky District
- Time zone: UTC+5:00

Khristoforovka (Russian: Христофоровка) is a rural locality (a village) in Khokhlovskoye Rural Settlement, Permsky District, Perm Krai, Russia. The population was 22 as of 2010. There are 3 streets.

== Geography ==
Khristoforovka is located 40 km north of Perm (the district's administrative centre) by road. Mishurna is the nearest rural locality.
