= Koltsovo, Perm Krai =

Koltsovo Кольцово
- Selo
- Location within Perm Krai Location within Russia
- Coordinates: 57°48′N 56°15′E
- Country: Russia
- Region: Perm Krai
- District: Permsky District
- Time zone: UTC+5:00

Koltsovo (Russian: Кольцово) is a rural locality (a selo) in Lobanovskoye Rural Settlement, Permsky District, Perm Krai, Russia. The population was 104 in 2010. There are nine streets.

== Geography ==
Koltsovo is located 30 km southeast of Perm (the district's administrative centre) by road. Klyuchi is the nearest rural locality.
