= Petryakhino =

Petryakhino Петряхино
- Village
- Location within Perm Krai Location within Russia
- Coordinates: 57°55′N 55°45′E
- Country: Russia
- Region: Perm Krai
- District: Permsky District
- Time zone: UTC+5:00

Petryakhino (Russian: Петряхино) is a rural locality (a village) in Zabolotskoye Rural Settlement, Permsky District, Perm Krai, Russia. The population was 15 as of 2010. There are 3 streets.

== Geography ==
Petryakhino is located 39 km southwest of Perm (the district's administrative centre) by road. Demino is the nearest rural locality.
