= Bulanki =

Bulanki Буланки
- Village
- Location within Perm Krai Location within Russia
- Coordinates: 57°59′N 56°45′E
- Country: Russia
- Region: Perm Krai
- District: Permsky District
- Time zone: UTC+5:00

Bulanki (Russian: Буланки) is a rural locality (a village) in Sylvenskoye Rural Settlement, Permsky District, Perm Krai, Russia. The population was 8 as of 2010.

== Geography ==
Bulanki is located 40 km east of Perm (the district's administrative centre) by road. Troitsa is the nearest rural locality.
