= Maly Bukor =

Maly Bukor Малый Букор
- Village
- Location within Perm Krai Location within Russia
- Coordinates: 56°41′N 54°16′E
- Country: Russia
- Region: Perm Krai
- District: Chaykovsky
- Time zone: UTC+5:00

Maly Bukor (Russian: Малый Букор) is a rural locality (a village) in Chaykovsky, Perm Krai, Russia. The population was 180 as of 2010. There are 15 streets.

== Geography ==
Maly Bukor is located 17 km southeast of Chaykovsky. Bolshoy Bukor is the nearest rural locality.
