= Berezovaya Gora =

Berezovaya Gora Березовая Гора
- Village
- Location within Perm Krai Location within Russia
- Coordinates: 57°44′N 57°41′E
- Country: Russia
- Region: Perm Krai
- District: Beryozovsky District
- Time zone: UTC+5:00

Berezovaya Gora (Russian: Березовая Гора) is a rural locality (a village) in Beryozovsky District, Perm Krai, Russia. The population was 53 as of 2010.
