= Bakharevka, Perm Krai =

Bakharevka Бахаревка
- Village
- Location within Perm Krai Location within Russia
- Coordinates: 57°56′N 56°14′E
- Country: Russia
- Region: Perm Krai
- District: Permsky District
- Time zone: UTC+5:00

Bakharevka (Russian: Бахаревка) is a rural locality (a village) in Frolovskoye Rural Settlement, Permsky District, Perm Krai, Russia. The population was 75 as of 2010. There are 13 streets.

== Geography ==
Bakharevka is located 9 km south of Perm (the district's administrative centre) by road. Krokhaleva is the nearest rural locality.
