= Bereg Kamy (Yugo-Kamskoye Rural Settlement), Permsky District, Perm Krai =

Bereg Kamy Берег Камы
- Village
- Location within Perm Krai Location within Russia
- Coordinates: 57°41′N 55°28′E
- Country: Russia
- Region: Perm Krai
- District: Permsky District
- Time zone: UTC+5:00

Bereg Kamy (Russian: Берег Камы) is a rural locality (a village) in Yugo-Kamskoye Rural Settlement, Permsky District, Perm Krai, Russia. The population was 23 as of 2010. There are 3 streets.

== Geography ==
It is located 9 km south-west from Yugo-Kamsky, and approximately 1144 km east of Moscow.
