= Trun (settlement) =

Trun Трун
- Settlement
- Location within Perm Krai Location within Russia
- Coordinates: 56°27′N 56°19′E
- Country: Russia
- Region: Perm Krai
- District: Chernushinsky District
- Time zone: UTC+5:00

Trun (Russian: Трун) is a rural locality (a settlement) in Chernushinsky District, Perm Krai, Russia. The population was 28 as of 2010. There are 3 streets.
