= Kochkino, Perm Krai =

Kochkino Кочкино
- Village
- Location within Perm Krai Location within European Russia Location within Russia
- Coordinates: 57°51′N 56°18′E
- Country: Russia
- Region: Perm Krai
- District: Permsky District
- Time zone: UTC+5:00

Kochkino (Russian: Кочкино) is a rural locality (a village) in Lobanovskoye Rural Settlement, Permsky District, Perm Krai, Russia. The population was 110 as of 2010. There are 3 streets.

== Geography ==
Kochkino is located 19 kilometres (12 mi) south of Perm (the district's administrative centre) by road. Lobanovo is the nearest rural locality.
