= Nizhnyaya, Perm Krai =

Nizhnyaya Нижняя
- Village
- Location within Perm Krai Location within Russia
- Coordinates: 59°17′N 57°09′E
- Country: Russia
- Region: Perm Krai
- District: Alexandrovsky District
- Time zone: UTC+5:00

Nizhnyaya (Russian: Нижняя) is a rural locality (a village) in Yayvinskoye Urban Settlement, Alexandrovsky District, Perm Krai, Russia. The population was 3 as of 2010.

== Geography ==
It is located on the Yayva River.
