= Yanychi =

Yanychi Янычи
- Selo
- Location within Perm Krai Location within Russia
- Coordinates: 57°41′N 56°25′E
- Country: Russia
- Region: Perm Krai
- District: Permsky District
- Time zone: UTC+5:00

Yanychi (Russian: Янычи) is a rural locality (a selo) in Bershetskoye Rural Settlement, Permsky District, Perm Krai, Russia. The population was 560 as of 2010. There are 38 streets.

== Geography ==
Yanychi is located 42 km south of Perm (the district's administrative centre) by road. Kukushtan is the nearest rural locality.
