= Bashkultayevo =

Bashkultayevo Башкултаево
- Selo
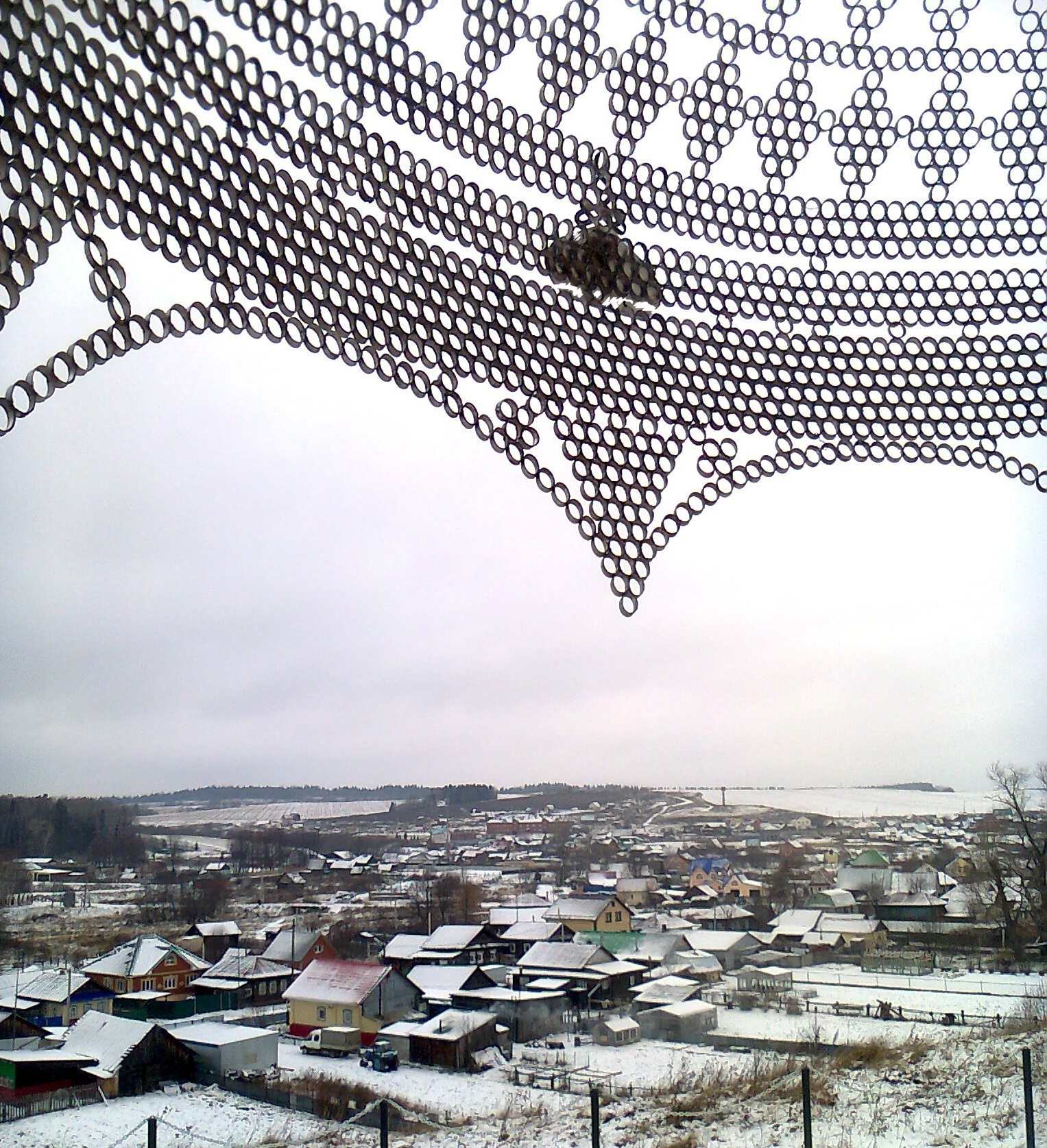

- Location within Perm Krai Location within Russia
- Coordinates: 57°50′N 55°54′E
- Country: Russia
- Region: Perm Krai
- District: Permsky District
- Time zone: UTC+5:00

Bashkultayevo (Russian: Башкултаево) is a rural locality (a selo) in Kultayevskoye Rural Settlement, Permsky District, Perm Krai, Russia. The population was 623 as of 2010. There are 33 streets.

== Geography ==
Bashkultayevo is located 29 km southwest of Perm (the district's administrative centre) by road. Mokino is the nearest rural locality.
