= Burenka =

Burenka Буренка
- Settlement
- Location within Perm Krai Location within Russia
- Coordinates: 56°32′N 54°32′E
- Country: Russia
- Region: Perm Krai
- District: Chaykovsky
- Time zone: UTC+5:00

Burenka (Russian: Буренка) is a rural locality (a settlement) in Chaykovsky, Perm Krai, Russia. The population was 630 as of 2010. There are 12 streets.

== Geography ==
Burenka is located 45 km southeast of Chaykovsky. Zipunovo is the nearest rural locality.
