= Kemul =

Kemul Кемуль
- Selo
- Location within Perm Krai Location within Russia
- Coordinates: 56°40′N 53°56′E
- Country: Russia
- Region: Perm Krai
- District: Chaykovsky
- Time zone: UTC+5:00

Kemul (Russian: Кемуль) is a rural locality (a selo) in Chaykovsky, Perm Krai, Russia. The population was 557 as of 2010. There are 4 streets.

== Geography ==
Kemul is located 21 km southwest of Chaykovsky. Kharnavy is the nearest rural locality.
