= Vassyata =

Vassyata Вассята
- Selo
- Location within Perm Krai Location within Russia
- Coordinates: 56°53′N 54°34′E
- Country: Russia
- Region: Perm Krai
- District: Chaykovsky
- Time zone: UTC+5:00

Vassyata (Russian: Вассята) is a rural locality (a selo) in Chaykovsky, Perm Krai, Russia. The population was 771 as of 2010. There are 8 streets.

== Geography ==
Vassyata is located 49 km northeast of Chaykovsky. Kizhi is the nearest rural locality.
