= Malakhova (Oshibskoye Rural Settlement), Kudymkarsky District, Perm Krai =

Malakhova Малахова
- Village
- Location within Perm Krai Location within Russia
- Coordinates: 59°15′N 54°41′E
- Country: Russia
- Region: Perm Krai
- District: Kudymkarsky District
- Time zone: UTC+5:00

Malakhova (Russian: Малахова) is a rural locality (a village) in Oshibskoye Rural Settlement, Kudymkarsky District, Perm Krai, Russia. The population was 15 in 2010.

== Geography ==
It is located 45 km north from Kudymkar.
