= Yermozy =

Yermozy Ермозы
- Village
- Location within Perm Krai Location within Russia
- Coordinates: 57°34′N 55°39′E
- Country: Russia
- Region: Perm Krai
- District: Permsky District
- Time zone: UTC+5:00

Yermozy (Russian: Ермозы) is a rural locality (a village) in Yugo-Kamskoye Rural Settlement, Permsky District, Perm Krai, Russia. The population was 6 as of 2010.

== Geography ==
Yermozy is located 73 km southwest of Perm (the district's administrative centre) by road. Novy is the nearest rural locality.
