= Opary =

Opary Опары
- Village
- Location within Perm Krai Location within Russia
- Coordinates: 56°47′N 54°22′E
- Country: Russia
- Region: Perm Krai
- District: Chaykovsky
- Time zone: UTC+5:00

Opary (Russian: Опары) is a rural locality (a village) in Chaykovsky, Perm Krai, Russia. The population was 80 as of 2010. There are 2 streets.

== Geography ==
Opary is located 27.9 km northeast of Chaykovsky. Koryaki BNP is the nearest rural locality.
