= Verkhnyaya Khokhlovka =

Verkhnyaya Khokhlovka Верхняя Хохловка
- Village
- Location within Perm Krai Location within Russia
- Coordinates: 58°16′N 56°14′E
- Country: Russia
- Region: Perm Krai
- District: Permsky District
- Time zone: UTC+5:00

Verkhnyaya Khokhlovka (Russian: Верхняя Хохловка) is a rural locality (a village) in Khokhlovskoye Rural Settlement, Permsky District, Perm Krai, Russia. The population was 4 as of 2010. There are 10 streets.

== Geography ==
Verkhnyaya Khokhlovka is located 49 km north of Perm (the district's administrative centre) by road. Khokhlovka is the nearest rural locality.
