= Vekoshinka =

Vekoshinka Векошинка
- Village
- Location within Perm Krai Location within Russia
- Coordinates: 56°56′N 54°18′E
- Country: Russia
- Region: Perm Krai
- District: Chaykovsky
- Time zone: UTC+5:00

Vekoshinka (Russian: Векошинка) is a rural locality (a village) in Chaykovsky, Perm Krai, Russia. The population was 49 as of 2010. There are 8 streets.

== Geography ==
Vekoshinka is located 55 km northeast of Chaykovsky. Pankovo is the nearest rural locality.
