= Klyuchi, Dobryansky District =

Klyuchi Ключи
- Village
- Location within Perm Krai Location within Russia
- Coordinates: 58°23′N 56°29′E
- Country: Russia
- Region: Perm Krai
- District: Dobryansky District
- Time zone: UTC+5:00

Klyuchi (Russian: Ключи) is a rural locality (a village) in Dobryansky District, Perm Krai, Russia. The population was 252 as of 2010.
