= Karyer Izvestnyak =

Karyer Izvestnyak Карьер Известняк
- Settlement
- Location within Perm Krai Location within Russia
- Coordinates: 59°11′N 57°28′E
- Country: Russia
- Region: Perm Krai
- District: Alexandrovsky District
- Time zone: UTC+5:00

Karyer Izvestnyak (Russian: Карьер Известняк) is a rural locality (a settlement) in Vsevolodo-Vilvenskoye Urban Settlement, Alexandrovsky District, Perm Krai, Russia. The population was 1,752 as of 2010. There are 24 streets.

== Geography ==
Karyer Izvestnyak is located 9 km northwest of Alexandrovsk (the district's administrative centre) by road. Vsevolodo-Vilva is the nearest rural locality.
