= Lugovaya (Rozhdestvenskoye Rural Settlement), Permsky District, Perm Krai =

Lugovaya Луговая
- Village
- Location within Perm Krai Location within Russia
- Coordinates: 57°33′N 55°42′E
- Country: Russia
- Region: Perm Krai
- District: Permsky District
- Time zone: UTC+5:00

Lugovaya (Russian: Луговая) is a rural locality (a village) in Yugo-Kamskoye Rural Settlement, Permsky District, Perm Krai, Russia. The population was 89 as of 2010.

== Geography ==
It is located 22 km south-east from Yugo-Kamsky.
