= Zhilya =

Zhilya Жилья
- Village
- Location within Perm Krai Location within Russia
- Coordinates: 57°32′N 55°41′E
- Country: Russia
- Region: Perm Krai
- District: Permsky District
- Time zone: UTC+5:00

Zhilya (Russian: Жилья) is a rural locality (a village) in Yugo-Kamskoye Rural Settlement, Permsky District, Perm Krai, Russia. The population was 2 as of 2010.

== Geography ==
Zhilya is located 76 km southwest of Perm (the district's administrative centre) by road. Novy is the nearest rural locality.
