= Zhak-Klyuch =

Zhak-Klyuch Жак-Ключ
- Village
- Location within Perm Krai Location within Russia
- Coordinates: 58°49′N 54°34′E
- Country: Russia
- Region: Perm Krai
- District: Kudymkarsky District
- Time zone: UTC+5:00

Zhak-Klyuch (Russian: Жак-Ключ) is a rural locality (a village) in Leninskoye Rural Settlement, Kudymkarsky District, Perm Krai, Russia. The population was 1 as of 2010.

== Geography ==
It is located 25 km south from Kudymkar.
