= Shestaki, Gubakhinsky Urban okrug =

Shestaki Шестаки
- Settlement
- Location within Perm Krai Location within Russia
- Coordinates: 58°50′N 57°22′E
- Country: Russia
- Region: Perm Krai
- District: Gubakhinsky Urban okrug
- Time zone: UTC+5:00

Shestaki (Russian: Шестаки) is a rural locality (a settlement) in Gubakhinsky Urban okrug, Perm Krai, Russia. The population was 66 as of 2010. There are 7 streets.
