= Bobovaya =

Bobovaya Боковая
- Settlement
- Location within Perm Krai Location within Russia
- Coordinates: 58°37′N 56°57′E
- Country: Russia
- Region: Perm Krai
- District: Dobryansky District
- Time zone: UTC+5:00

Bobovaya (Russian: Боковая) is a rural locality (a settlement) in Dobryansky District, Perm Krai, Russia. The population was 206 as of 2010. There are 3 streets.
