= Rusalevka =

Rusalevka Русалевка
- Village
- Location within Perm Krai Location within Russia
- Coordinates: 56°43′N 54°21′E
- Country: Russia
- Region: Perm Krai
- District: Chaykovsky
- Time zone: UTC+5:00

Rusalevka (Russian: Русалевка) is a rural locality (a village) in Chaykovsky, Perm Krai, Russia. The population was 267 as of 2010. There are 6 streets.

== Geography ==
Rusalevka is located 19 km southeast of Chaykovsky. Foki is the nearest rural locality.
