= Sarapulka =

Sarapulka Сарапулка
- Village
- Location within Perm Krai Location within Russia
- Coordinates: 56°37′N 54°33′E
- Country: Russia
- Region: Perm Krai
- District: Chaykovsky
- Time zone: UTC+5:00

Sarapulka (Russian: Сарапулка) is a rural locality (a village) in Chaykovsky, Perm Krai, Russia. The population was 49 as of 2010. There are 3 streets.

== Geography ==
Sarapulka is located 42 km southeast of Chaykovsky. Solovyi is the nearest rural locality.
