= Shondikha =

Shondikha Шондиха
- Village
- Location within Perm Krai Location within Russia
- Coordinates: 57°31′N 55°39′E
- Country: Russia
- Region: Perm Krai
- District: Permsky District
- Time zone: UTC+5:00

Shondikha (Russian: Шондиха) is a rural locality (a village) in Yugo-Kamskoye Rural Settlement, Permsky District, Perm Krai, Russia. The population was 10 as of 2010.

== Geography ==
Shondikha is located 78 km southwest of Perm (the district's administrative centre) by road. Zhilya is the nearest rural locality.
