= Glushata =

Glushata Глушата
- Village
- Location within Perm Krai Location within Russia
- Coordinates: 58°11′N 56°17′E
- Country: Russia
- Region: Perm Krai
- District: Permsky District
- Time zone: UTC+5:00

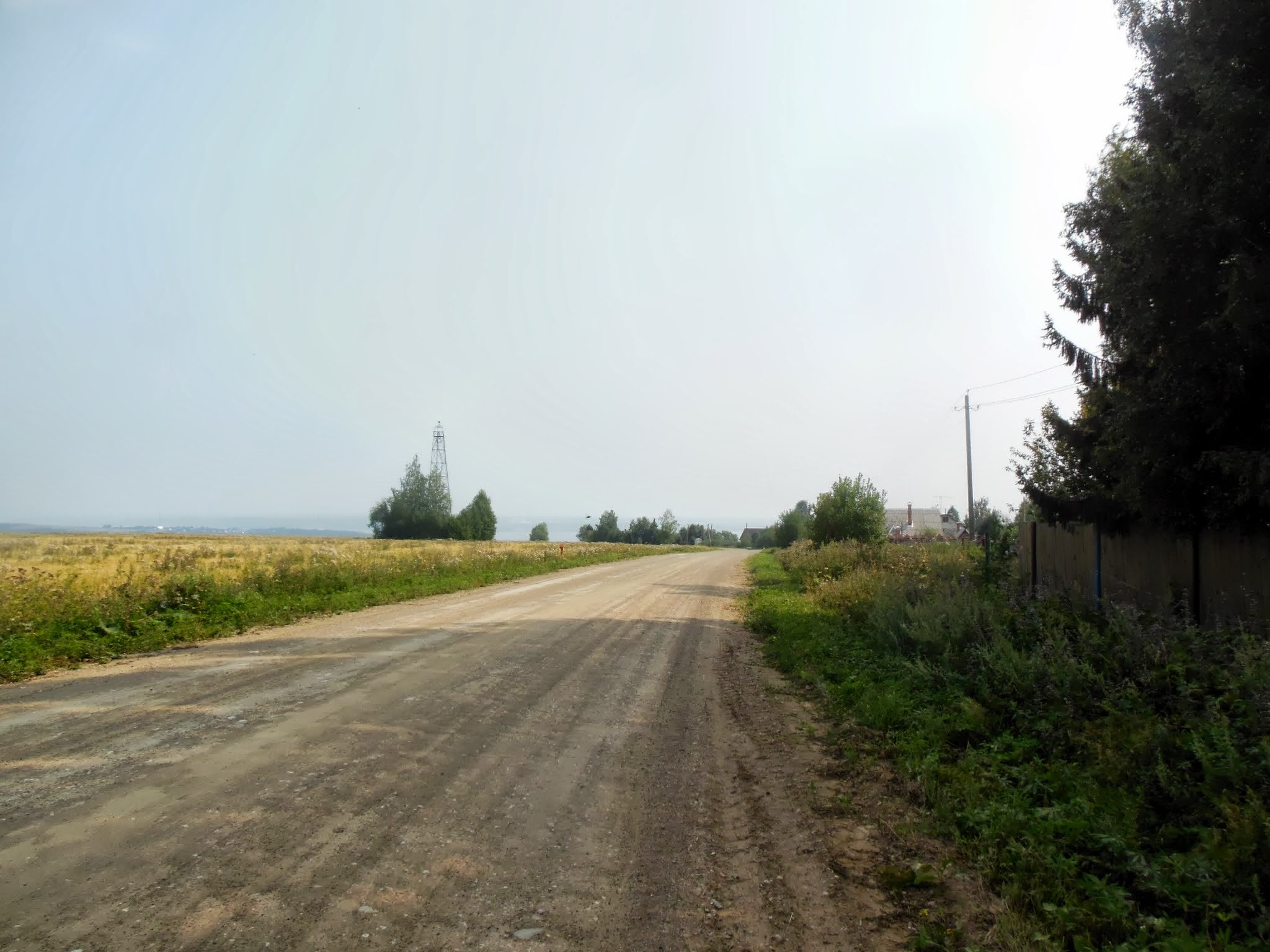
Glushata, Permskiy kray, Russia

Glushata (Russian: Глушата) is a rural locality (a village) in Khokhlovskoye Rural Settlement, Permsky District, Perm Krai, Russia. The population was 40 as of 2010. There are five streets.

== Geography ==
Glushata is located 32 km north of Perm (the district's administrative centre) by road. Zaozerye is the nearest rural locality.
