= Tupitsa =

Tupitsa Тупица
- Village
- Location within Perm Krai Location within Russia
- Coordinates: 58°11′N 56°19′E
- Country: Russia
- Region: Perm Krai
- District: Permsky District
- Time zone: UTC+5:00

Tupitsa (Russian: Тупица) is a rural locality (a village) in Khokhlovskoye Rural Settlement, Permsky District, Perm Krai, Russia. The population was 29 as of 2010. There are 20 streets.

== Geography ==
Tupitsa is located 31 km north of Perm (the district's administrative centre) by road. Zaozerye is the nearest rural locality.
