= Chelyaba =

Chelyaba Челяба
- Village
- Location within Perm Krai Location within Russia
- Coordinates: 57°36′N 56°14′E
- Country: Russia
- Region: Perm Krai
- District: Permsky District
- Time zone: UTC+5:00

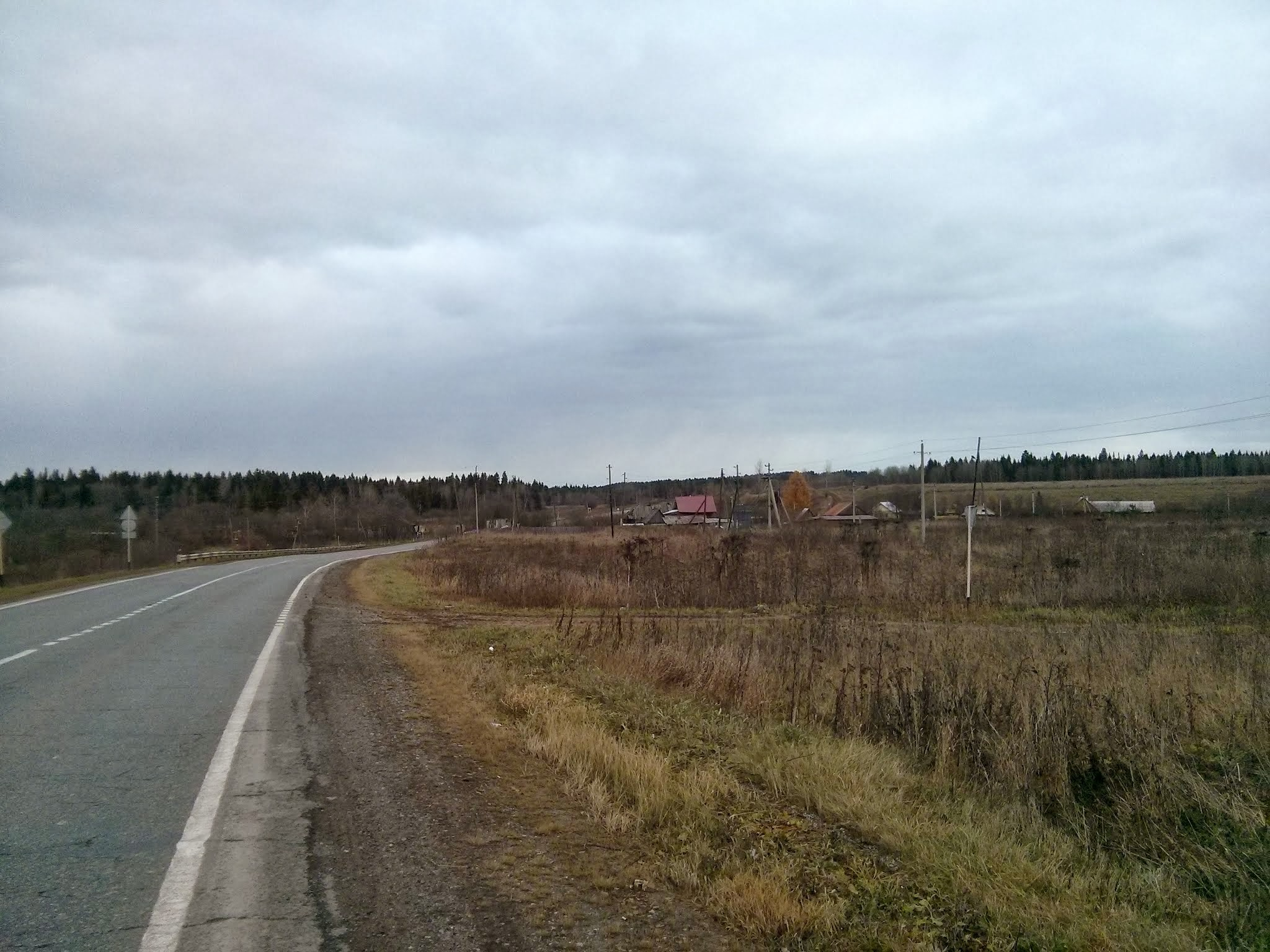
View of a road in Chelyaba

Chelyaba (Russian: Челяба) is a rural locality (a village) in Palnikovskoye Rural Settlement, Permsky District, Perm Krai, Russia. The population was 71 as of 2010. There are 2 streets.

== Geography ==
Chelyaba is located 61 km south of Perm (the district's administrative centre) by road. Byrma is the nearest rural locality.
