= Pazderino =

Pazderino Паздерино
- Village
- Location within Perm Krai Location within Russia
- Coordinates: 57°56′N 56°19′E
- Country: Russia
- Region: Perm Krai
- District: Permsky District
- Time zone: UTC+5:00

Pazderino (Russian: Паздерино) is a rural locality (a village) in Frolovskoye Rural Settlement, Permsky District, Perm Krai, Russia. The population was 41 as of 2010. There are five streets.

== Geography ==
Pazderino is located 14 km southeast of Perm (the district's administrative centre) by road. Bolshaya Mos is the nearest rural locality.
