= Nestyukovo =

Nestyukovo Нестюково
- Village
- Location within Perm Krai Location within Russia
- Coordinates: 57°53′N 56°15′E
- Country: Russia
- Region: Perm Krai
- District: Permsky District
- Time zone: UTC+5:00

Nestyukovo (Russian: Нестюково) is a rural locality (a village) in Dvurechenskoye Rural Settlement, Permsky District, Perm Krai, Russia. The population was 1,077 as of 2010. There are 21 streets.

== Geography ==
Nestyukovo is located 17 km south of Perm (the district's administrative centre) by road. Lobanovo is the nearest rural locality.
