= Gory, Dobryansky District =

Gory Горы
- Village
- Location within Perm Krai Location within Russia
- Coordinates: 58°22′N 56°29′E
- Country: Russia
- Region: Perm Krai
- District: Dobryansky District
- Time zone: UTC+5:00

Gory (Russian: Горы) is a rural locality (a village) in Dobryansky District, Perm Krai, Russia. The population was 15 as of 2010. There are three streets.
