= Krasava, Perm Krai =

Krasava Красава
- Village
- Location within Perm Krai Location within Russia
- Coordinates: 57°55′N 56°19′E
- Country: Russia
- Region: Perm Krai
- District: Permsky District
- Time zone: UTC+5:00

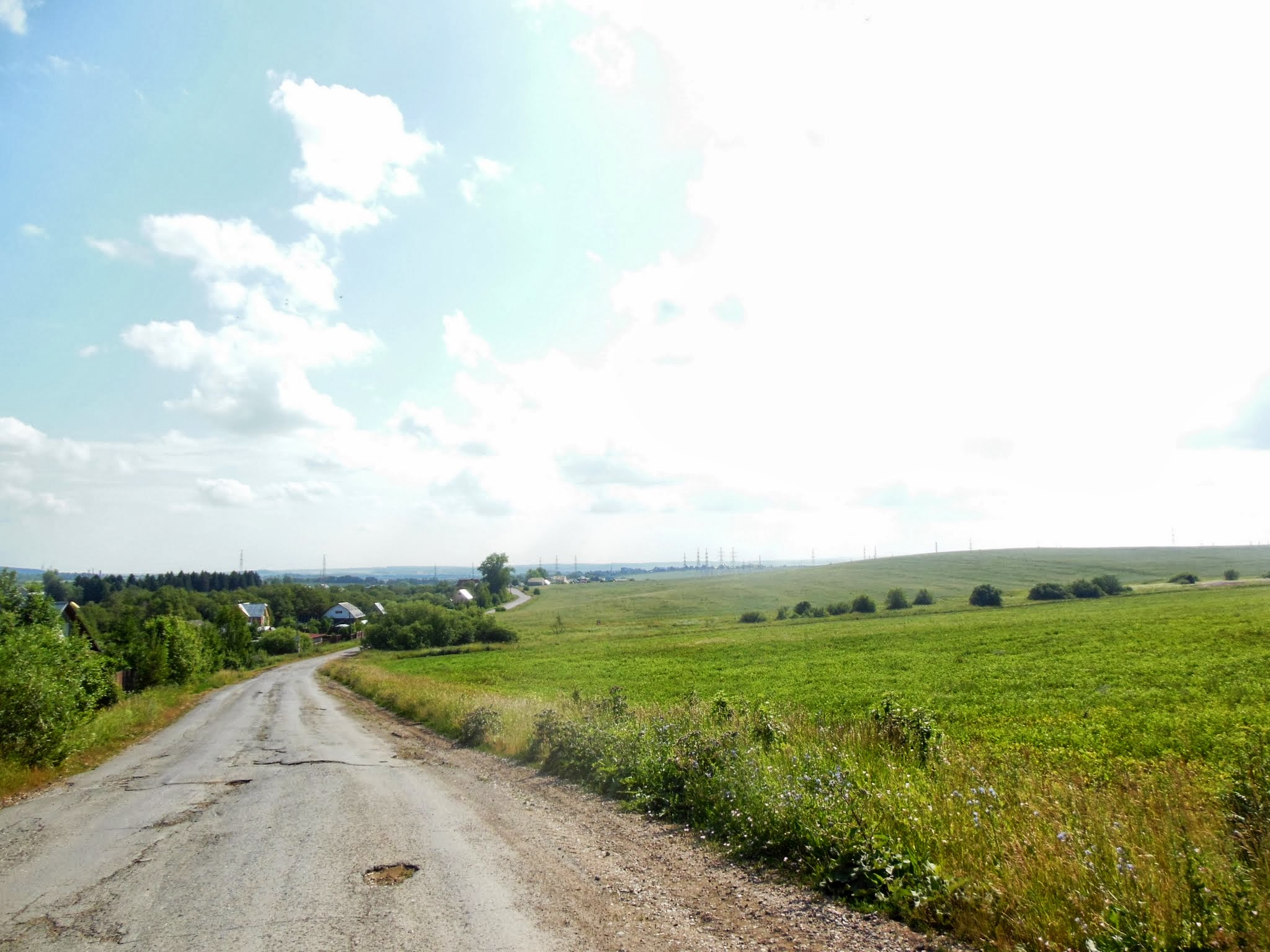
Krasava, Permskiy kray, Russia

Krasava (Russian: Красава) is a rural locality (a village) in Frolovskoye Rural Settlement, Permsky District, Perm Krai, Russia. The population was 14 as of 2010. There are 2 streets.

== Geography ==
Krasava is located 14 km southeast of Perm (the district's administrative centre) by road. Deriby is the nearest rural locality.
