= Zubki, Perm Krai =

Zubki Зубки
- Village
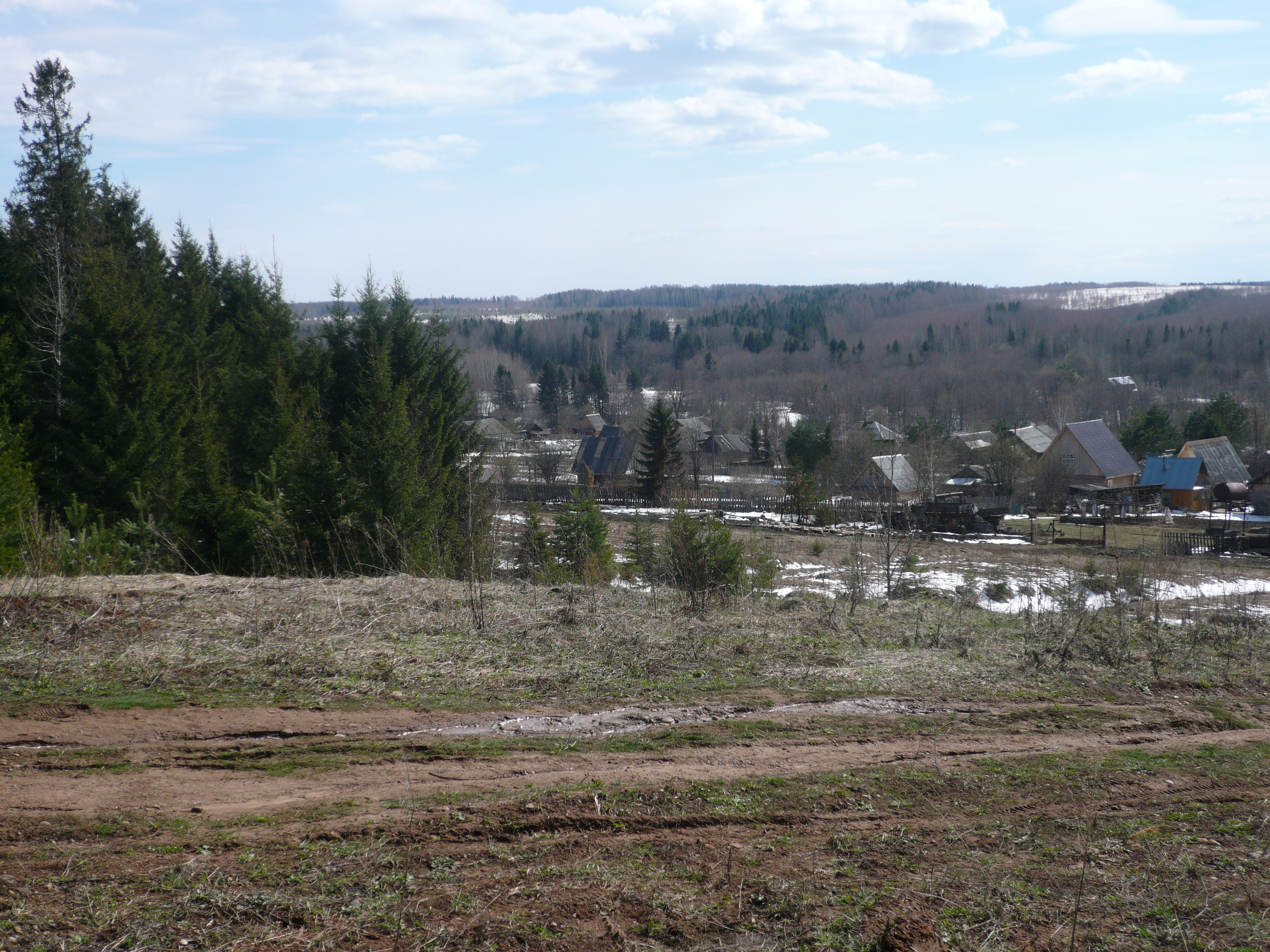
- Village Zubki

- Location within Perm Krai Location within Russia
- Coordinates: 57°52′N 55°32′E
- Country: Russia
- Region: Perm Krai
- District: Permsky District
- Time zone: UTC+5:00

Zubki (Russian: Зубки) is a rural locality (a village) in Zabolotskoye Rural Settlement, Permsky District, Perm Krai, Russia. The population was 18 as of 2010. There are 4 streets.

== Geography ==
Zubki is located 60 km southwest of Perm (the district's administrative centre) by road. Kommuna is the nearest rural locality.
