= Lyuzen =

Lyuzen Люзень
- Settlement
- Location within Perm Krai Location within Russia
- Coordinates: 59°19′N 57°07′E
- Country: Russia
- Region: Perm Krai
- District: Alexandrovsky District
- Time zone: UTC+5:00

Lyuzen (Russian: Люзень) is a rural locality (a settlement) in Yayvinskoye Urban Settlement, Alexandrovsky District, Perm Krai, Russia. The population was 33 as of 2010.

== Geography ==
Lyuzen is located 43 km northwest of Alexandrovsk (the district's administrative centre) by road. Zheleznodorozhny is the nearest rural locality.
