= Mostovaya (Mostovskoye Rural Settlement), Permsky District, Perm Krai =

Mostovaya Мостовая
- Village
- Location within Perm Krai Location within Russia
- Coordinates: 57°50′N 56°40′E
- Country: Russia
- Region: Perm Krai
- District: Permsky District
- Time zone: UTC+5:00

Mostovaya (Russian: Мостовая) is a rural locality (a village) in Dvurechenskoye Rural Settlement, Permsky District, Perm Krai, Russia. The population was 788 as of 2010.

== Geography ==
Mostovaya is located on the Mostovaya River, 44 km southeast of Perm (the district's administrative centre) by road.
