= Vanyuki =

Vanyuki Ванюки
- Village
- Location within Perm Krai Location within Russia
- Coordinates: 57°56′N 56°02′E
- Country: Russia
- Region: Perm Krai
- District: Permsky District
- Time zone: UTC+5:00

Vanyuki (Russian: Ванюки) is a rural locality (a village) in Savinskoye Rural Settlement, Permsky District, Perm Krai, Russia. The population was 886 as of 2010. There are 6 streets.

== Geography ==
Vanyuki is located 15 km southwest of Perm (the district's administrative centre) by road. Yasyri is the nearest rural locality.
