= Gorshki =

Gorshki Горшки
- Village
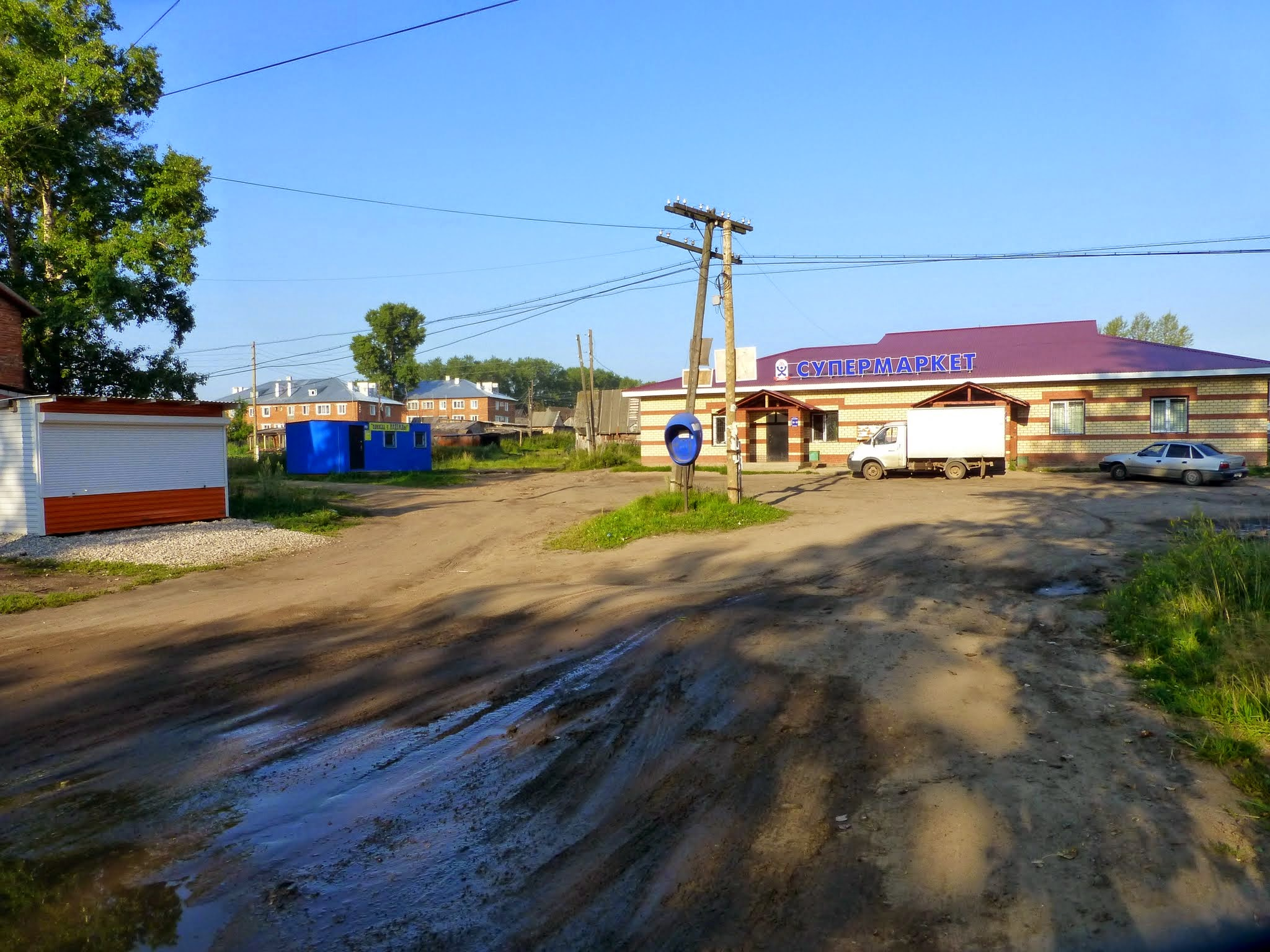
- Gorshki, Permsky district, Russia

- Location within Perm Krai Location within Russia
- Coordinates: 57°01′N 55°44′E
- Country: Russia
- Region: Perm Krai
- District: Permsky District
- Time zone: UTC+5:00

Gorshki (Russian: Горшки) is a rural locality (a village) and the administrative center of Zabolotskoye Rural Settlement, Permsky District, Perm Krai, Russia. The population was 748 as of 2010. There are 30 streets.

== Geography ==
Gorshki is located 41 km southwest of Perm (the district's administrative centre) by road. Rastyagayevo is the nearest rural locality.
