= Chuvaki =

Chuvaki Чуваки
- Village
- Location within Perm Krai Location within Russia
- Coordinates: 57°51′N 55°58′E
- Country: Russia
- Region: Perm Krai
- District: Permsky District
- Time zone: UTC+5:00

Chuvaki (Russian: Чуваки) is a rural locality (a village) in Kultayevskoye Rural Settlement, Permsky District, Perm Krai, Russia. The population was 182 as of 2010. There are 10 streets.

== Geography ==
Chuvaki is located 26 km southwest of Perm (the district's administrative centre) by road. Boldino is the nearest rural locality.
