= Pashnya =

Pashnya Пашня
- Village
- Location within Perm Krai Location within Russia
- Coordinates: 57°40′N 55°31′E
- Country: Russia
- Region: Perm Krai
- District: Permsky District
- Time zone: UTC+5:00

Pashnya (Russian: Пашня) is a rural locality (a village) in Yugo-Kamskoye Rural Settlement, Permsky District, Perm Krai, Russia. The population was 51 as of 2010. There are 19 streets.

== Geography ==
Pashnya is located 60 km southwest of Perm (the district's administrative centre) by road. Yugo-Kamsky is the nearest rural locality.
