= Kamsky, Perm Krai =

Kamsky Камский
- Settlement
- Location within Perm Krai Location within Russia
- Coordinates: 58°20′N 56°13′E
- Country: Russia
- Region: Perm Krai
- District: Dobryansky District
- Time zone: UTC+5:00

Kamsky (Russian: Камский) is a rural locality (a settlement) in Dobryansky District, Perm Krai, Russia. The population was 431 as of 2010. There are 10 streets.
