= Lytvensky =

Lytvensky Лытвенский
- Settlement
- Location within Perm Krai Location within Russia
- Coordinates: 59°08′N 57°33′E
- Country: Russia
- Region: Perm Krai
- District: Alexandrovsky District
- Time zone: UTC+5:00

Lytvensky (Russian: Лытвенский) is a rural locality (a settlement) in Alexandrovskoye Urban Settlement, Alexandrovsky District, Perm Krai, Russia. The population was 419 as of 2010. There are 8 streets.

== Geography ==
Lytvensky is located 6 km southwest of Alexandrovsk (the district's administrative centre) by road. Alexandrovsk is the nearest rural locality.
