= Bezgodovo =

Bezgodovo Безгодово
- Settlement
- Location within Perm Krai Location within Russia
- Coordinates: 58°52′N 58°03′E
- Country: Russia
- Region: Perm Krai
- District: Gremyachinsky Urban okrug
- Time zone: UTC+5:00

Bezgodovo (Russian: Безгодово) is a rural locality (a settlement) in Gremyachinsky Urban okrug, Perm Krai, Russia. The population was 71 as of 2010. There are 5 streets.

== Geography ==
Bezgodovo is located 62 km north of Gremyachinsk (the district's administrative centre) by road. Yubileyny is the nearest rural locality.
