= Sibir, Permsky District, Perm Krai =

Sibir Сибирь
- Village
- Location within Perm Krai Location within Russia
- Coordinates: 58°15′N 56°14′E
- Country: Russia
- Region: Perm Krai
- District: Permsky District
- Time zone: UTC+5:00

Sibir (Russian: Сибирь) is a rural locality (a village) in Khokhlovskoye Rural Settlement, Permsky District, Perm Krai, Russia. The population was 16 as of 2010. There are 5 streets.

== Geography ==
Sibir is located 47 km north of Perm (the district's administrative centre) by road. Khokhlovka is the nearest rural locality.
