= Polyudovo =

Polyudovo Полюдово
- Village
- Location within Perm Krai Location within Russia
- Coordinates: 57°50′N 55°59′E
- Country: Russia
- Region: Perm Krai
- District: Permsky District
- Time zone: UTC+5:00

Polyudovo (Russian: Полюдово) is a rural locality (a village) in Kultayevskoye Rural Settlement, Permsky District, Perm Krai, Russia. The population was 26 as of 2010. There are five streets.

== Geography ==
Polyudovo is located 28 km southwest of Perm (the district's administrative centre) by road. Dikaya Gar is the nearest rural locality.
