= Garyushki =

Garyushki Гарюшки
- Village
- Location within Perm Krai Location within Russia
- Coordinates: 57°48′N 56°44′E
- Country: Russia
- Region: Perm Krai
- District: Permsky District
- Time zone: UTC+5:00

Garyushki (Russian: Гарюшки) is a rural locality (a village) in Dvurechenskoye Rural Settlement, Permsky District, Perm Krai, Russia. The population was 11 as of 2010. There are 12 streets.

== Geography ==
Garyushki is located 49 km southeast of Perm (the district's administrative centre) by road. Sterlyagovo is the nearest rural locality.
