= Vasyukova, Kuvinsky Selsoviet, Kudymkarsky District, Perm Krai =

Vasyukova Васюкова
- Village
- Location within Perm Krai Location within Russia
- Coordinates: 59°08′N 54°33′E
- Country: Russia
- Region: Perm Krai
- District: Kudymkarsky District
- Time zone: UTC+5:00

Vasyukova (Russian: Васюкова) is a rural locality (a village) in Kuvinsky Selsoviet, Kudymkarsky District, Perm Krai, Russia. The population was 95 as of 2010.

== Geography ==
It is located 33 km north-west from Kudymkar.
