= Baseg =

Baseg Басег
- Settlement
- Location within Perm Krai Location within Russia
- Coordinates: 58°37′N 57°40′E
- Country: Russia
- Region: Perm Krai
- District: Gubakha Urban Okrug
- Time zone: UTC+5:00

Baseg (Russian: Басе́г) is a rural locality (a settlement) in Gubakha Urban Okrug, Perm Krai, Russia. The population was 14 as of 2010.
