= Kolyady =

Kolyady Коляды
- Village
- Location within Perm Krai Location within Russia
- Coordinates: 57°57′N 55°48′E
- Country: Russia
- Region: Perm Krai
- District: Permsky District
- Time zone: UTC+5:00

Kolyady (Russian: Коляды) is a rural locality (a village) in Zabolotskoye Rural Settlement, Permsky District, Perm Krai, Russia. The population was 7 as of 2010. There is 1 street.

== Geography ==
Kolyady is located 47 km southwest of Perm (the district's administrative centre) by road. Trukhinyata is the nearest rural locality.
