= Baskiye =

Baskiye Баские
- Village
- Location within Perm Krai Location within Russia
- Coordinates: 57°49′N 56°13′E
- Country: Russia
- Region: Perm Krai
- District: Permsky District
- Time zone: UTC+5:00

Baskiye (Russian: Баские) is a rural locality (a village) in Lobanovskoye Rural Settlement, Permsky District, Perm Krai, Russia. The population was 3 as of 2010.

== Geography ==
Baskiye is located 37 km south of Perm (the district's administrative centre) by road. Kasimovo is the nearest rural locality.
