= Kozlova, (Beloyevskoye Rural Settlement), Kudymkarsky District, Perm Krai =

Kozlova Козлова
- Village
- Location within Perm Krai Location within Russia
- Coordinates: 59°12′N 54°32′E
- Country: Russia
- Region: Perm Krai
- District: Kudymkarsky District
- Time zone: UTC+5:00

Kozlova (Russian: Козлова) is a rural locality (a village) in Beloyevskoye Rural Settlement, Kudymkarsky District, Perm Krai, Russia. The population was 11 as of 2010.

== Geography ==
It is located 27 km north from Kudymkar.
