= Ploska, Perm Krai =

Ploska Плоска
- Village
- Location within Perm Krai Location within Russia
- Coordinates: 57°26′N 54°30′E
- Country: Russia
- Region: Perm Krai
- District: Bolshesosnovsky District
- Time zone: UTC+5:00

Ploska (Russian: Плоска) is a rural locality (a village) in Chernovskoye Rural Settlement, Bolshesosnovsky District, Perm Krai, Russia. The population was 92 as of 2010. There are 3 streets.

== Geography ==
It is located 7.5 km south-west from Chernovskoye.
