= Klyuchi, Gubakhinsky Urban okrug =

Klyuchi Ключи
- Settlement
- Location within Perm Krai Location within Russia
- Coordinates: 59°00′N 57°26′E
- Country: Russia
- Region: Perm Krai
- District: Gubakhinsky Urban okrug
- Time zone: UTC+5:00

Klyuchi (Russian: Ключи) is a rural locality (a settlement) in Gubakhinsky Urban okrug, Perm Krai, Russia. The population was 13 as of 2010. There are 2 streets.
