= Maloye Savino =

Maloye Savino Малое Савино
- Village
- Location within Perm Krai Location within Russia
- Coordinates: 57°55′N 55°59′E
- Country: Russia
- Region: Perm Krai
- District: Permsky District
- Time zone: UTC+5:00

Maloye Savino (Russian: Малое Савино) is a rural locality (a village) in Savinskoye Rural Settlement, Permsky District, Perm Krai, Russia. The population was 29 as of 2010. There are 3 streets.

== Geography ==
Maloye Savino is located 20 km southwest of Perm (the district's administrative centre) by road. Kichanovo is the nearest rural locality.
