= Prikamsky =

Prikamsky Прикамский
- Settlement
- Location within Perm Krai Location within Russia
- Coordinates: 56°43′N 54°02′E
- Country: Russia
- Region: Perm Krai
- District: Chaykovsky
- Time zone: UTC+5:00

Prikamsky (Russian: Прикамский) is a rural locality (a settlement) and the administrative center of Olkhovskoye Rural Settlement, Chaykovsky, Perm Krai, Russia. The population was 1,252 as of 2010. There are 15 streets.

== Geography ==
Prikamsky is located 9 km southwest of Chaykovsky. Olkhovka is the nearest rural locality.
