= Laki, Perm Krai =

Laki Лаки
- Settlement
- Location within Perm Krai Location within Russia
- Coordinates: 58°30′N 58°46′E
- Country: Russia
- Region: Perm Krai
- District: Gornozavodsky District
- Time zone: UTC+5:00

Laki (Russian: Лаки) is a rural locality (a settlement) in Gornozavodsky District, Perm Krai, Russia. The population was 4 as of 2010.
