= Seysmopartiya =

Seysmopartiya Сейсмопартия
- Settlement
- Location within Perm Krai Location within Russia
- Coordinates: 60°23′N 57°01′E
- Country: Russia
- Region: Perm Krai
- District: Krasnovishersky District
- Time zone: UTC+5:00

Seysmopartiya (Russian: Сейсмопартия) is a rural locality (a settlement) in Krasnovishersky District, Perm Krai, Russia. The population was 81 as of 2010. There is 1 street.
