= Ust-Igum =

Ust-Igum Усть-Игум
- Selo
- Location within Perm Krai Location within Russia
- Coordinates: 59°09′N 57°08′E
- Country: Russia
- Region: Perm Krai
- District: Alexandrovsky District
- Time zone: UTC+5:00

Ust-Igum (Russian: Усть-Игум) is a rural locality (a selo) in Vsevolodo-Vilvenskoye Urban Settlement, Alexandrovsky District, Perm Krai, Russia. The population was 452 as of 2010. There are 25 streets.

== Geography ==
Ust-Igum is located 34 km west of Alexandrovsk (the district's administrative centre) by road. Ust-Usolka is the nearest rural locality.
