= Mysy =

Mysy Мысы
- Village
- Location within Perm Krai Location within Russia
- Coordinates: 58°14′N 56°16′E
- Country: Russia
- Region: Perm Krai
- District: Permsky District
- Time zone: UTC+5:00

Mysy (Russian: Мысы) is a rural locality (a village) in Khokhlovskoye Rural Settlement, Permsky District, Perm Krai, Russia. The population was 48 as of 2010. There are 9 streets.

== Geography ==
Mysy is located 44 km north of Perm (the district's administrative centre) by road. Gora is the nearest rural locality.
