= Ivakinsky Karyer =

Ivakinsky Karyer Ивакинский Карьер
- Settlement
- Location within Perm Krai Location within Russia
- Coordinates: 59°15′N 57°28′E
- Country: Russia
- Region: Perm Krai
- District: Alexandrovsky District
- Time zone: UTC+5:00

Ivakinsky Karyer (Russian: Ивакинский Карьер) is a rural locality (a settlement) in Vsevolodo-Vilvenskoye Urban Settlement, Alexandrovsky District, Perm Krai, Russia. The population was 331 as of 2010. There are 10 streets.

== Geography ==
Ivakinsky Karyer is located 15 km northwest of Alexandrovsk (the district's administrative centre) by road. Vsevolodo-Vilva is the nearest rural locality.
