= Shulgino, Perm Krai =

Shulgino Шульгино
- Village
- Location within Perm Krai Location within Russia
- Coordinates: 57°51′N 56°07′E
- Country: Russia
- Region: Perm Krai
- District: Permsky District
- Time zone: UTC+5:00

Shulgino (Russian: Шульгино) is a rural locality (a village) in Gamovskoye Rural Settlement, Permsky District, Perm Krai, Russia. The population was 35 as of 2010.

== Geography ==
Shulgino is located 23 km southwest of Perm (the district's administrative centre) by road. Savenki is the nearest rural locality.
