= Shirpy =

Shirpy Ширпы
- Village
- Location within Perm Krai Location within Russia
- Coordinates: 58°17′N 56°12′E
- Country: Russia
- Region: Perm Krai
- District: Permsky District
- Time zone: UTC+5:00

Shirpy (Russian: Ширпы) is a rural locality (a village) in Khokhlovskoye Rural Settlement, Permsky District, Perm Krai, Russia. The population was 4 as of 2010. There are 13 streets.

== Geography ==
Shirpy is located 51 km north of Perm (the district's administrative centre) by road. Verkhnyaya Khokhlovka is the nearest rural locality.
