= Rodina (Leninskoye Rural Settlement), Kudymkarsky District, Perm Krai =

Rodina Родина
- Village
- Location within Perm Krai Location within Russia
- Coordinates: 58°48′N 54°39′E
- Country: Russia
- Region: Perm Krai
- District: Kudymkarsky District
- Time zone: UTC+5:00

Rodina (Russian: Родина) is a rural locality (a village) in Leninskoye Rural Settlement, Kudymkarsky District, Perm Krai, Russia. The population was 3 as of 2010.

== Geography ==
It is located 23 km south from Kudymkar.
