= Verkh-Syra =

Verkh-Syra Верх-Сыра
- Village
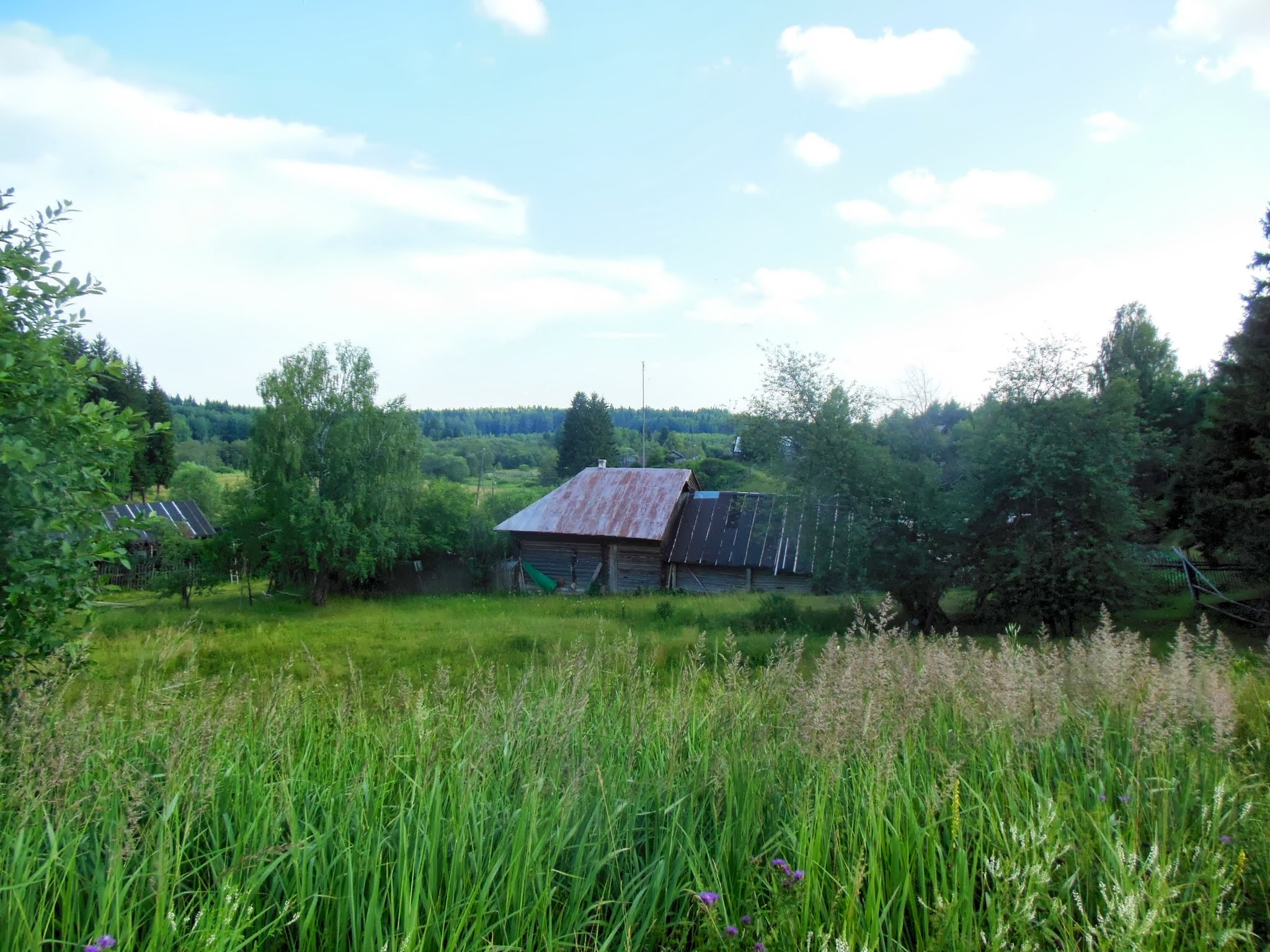
- Permskiy, Russia

- Location within Perm Krai Location within Russia
- Coordinates: 57°51′N 56°26′E
- Country: Russia
- Region: Perm Krai
- District: Permsky District
- Time zone: UTC+5:00

Verkh-Syra (Russian: Верх-Сыра) is a rural locality (a village) in Lobanovskoye Rural Settlement, Permsky District, Perm Krai, Russia. The population was 1 as of 2010. There is 1 street.

== Geography ==
Verkh-Syra is located on the Syra River, 26 km southeast of Perm (the district's administrative centre) by road. Merkushevo is the nearest rural locality.
