= Baranova (Stepanovskoye Rural Settlement, Kudymkarsky District, Perm Krai) =

Baranova Баранова
- Village
- Location within Perm Krai Location within Russia
- Coordinates: 58°59′N 54°33′E
- Country: Russia
- Region: Perm Krai
- District: Kudymkarsky District
- Time zone: UTC+5:00

Baranova (Russian: Баранова) is a rural locality (a village) in Stepanovskoye Rural Settlement, Kudymkarsky District, Perm Krai, Russia. The population was 31 as of 2010.

== Geography ==
It is located 7 km south-east from Kudymkar.
