= Lesouchastok 831 =

Lesouchastok 831 Лесоучасток 831
- Settlement
- Location within Perm Krai Location within Russia
- Coordinates: 57°56′N 56°34′E
- Country: Russia
- Region: Perm Krai
- District: Permsky District
- Time zone: UTC+5:00

Lesouchastok 831 (Russian: Лесоучасток 831) is a rural locality (a settlement) in Frolovskoye Rural Settlement, Permsky District, Perm Krai, Russia. The population was 87 as of 2010. There are 24 streets.

== Geography ==
Lesouchastok 831 is located 28 km southeast of Perm (the district's administrative centre) by road. Molokovo is the nearest rural locality.
