= Malyye Klestyata =

Malyye Klestyata Малые Клестята
- Village
- Location within Perm Krai Location within Russia
- Coordinates: 57°50′N 56°20′E
- Country: Russia
- Region: Perm Krai
- District: Permsky District
- Time zone: UTC+5:00

Malyye Klestyata (Russian: Малые Клестята) is a rural locality (a village) in Lobanovskoye Rural Settlement, Permsky District, Perm Krai, Russia. The population was 34 as of 2010. There are 2 streets.

== Geography ==
Malyye Klestyata is located 22 km south of Perm (the district's administrative centre) by road. Klestyata is the nearest rural locality.
