= Klestyata =

Klestyata Клестята
- Village
- Location within Perm Krai Location within Russia
- Coordinates: 57°51′N 56°20′E
- Country: Russia
- Region: Perm Krai
- District: Permsky District
- Time zone: UTC+5:00

Klestyata (Russian: Клестята) is a rural locality (a village) in Lobanovskoye Rural Settlement, Permsky District, Perm Krai, Russia. The population was 179 as of 2010. There are 4 streets.

== Geography ==
Klestyata is located 21 km southeast of Perm (the district's administrative centre) by road. Malye Klestyata is the nearest rural locality.
