= Chikman =

Chikman Чикман
- Settlement
- Location within Perm Krai Location within Russia
- Coordinates: 59°27′N 57°57′E
- Country: Russia
- Region: Perm Krai
- District: Alexandrovsky District
- Time zone: UTC+5:00

Chikman (Russian: Чикман) is a rural locality (a settlement) in Skopkortnenskoye Rural Settlement, Alexandrovsky District, Perm Krai, Russia. The population was 23 as of 2010. There are 4 streets.

== Geography ==
Chikman is located 58 km northeast of Alexandrovsk (the district's administrative centre) by road. Skopkortnaya is the nearest rural locality.
