= Stepanovo, Tchaykovsky, Perm Krai =

Stepanovo Степаново
- Village
- Location within Perm Krai Location within Russia
- Coordinates: 56°50′N 54°17′E
- Country: Russia
- Region: Perm Krai
- District: Chaykovsky
- Time zone: UTC+5:00

Stepanovo (Russian: Степаново) is a rural locality (a village) in Chaykovsky, Perm Krai, Russia. The population was 198 as of 2010. There are 4 streets.

== Geography ==
Stepanovo is located 39 km northeast of Chaykovsky. Koryaki BNP is the nearest rural locality.
