= Verkh-Rechka =

Verkh-Rechka Верх-Речка
- Village
- Location within Perm Krai Location within Russia
- Coordinates: 57°51′N 55°32′E
- Country: Russia
- Region: Perm Krai
- District: Permsky District
- Time zone: UTC+5:00

Verkh-Rechka (Russian: Верх-Речка) is a rural locality (a village) in Zabolotskoye Rural Settlement, Permsky District, Perm Krai, Russia. The population was 16 as of 2010. There are 3 streets.

== Geography ==
Verkh-Rechka is located 62 km southwest of Perm (the district's administrative centre) by road. Novoilyinskoye is the nearest rural locality.
