= Amaneyevo =

Amaneyevo Аманеево
- Village
- Location within Perm Krai Location within Russia
- Coordinates: 56°55′N 54°35′E
- Country: Russia
- Region: Perm Krai
- District: Chaykovsky
- Time zone: UTC+5:00

Amaneyevo (Russian: Аманеево) is a rural locality (a village) in Chaykovsky, Perm Krai, Russia. The population was 77 as of 2010. There are 2 streets.

== Geography ==
Amaneyevo is located 53 km northeast of Chaykovsky. Vassyata is the nearest rural locality.
