= Kauchuk, Perm Krai =

Kauchuk Каучук
- Railway station
- Location within Perm Krai Location within Russia
- Coordinates: 56°39′N 53°55′E
- Country: Russia
- Region: Perm Krai
- District: Tchaikovsky
- Time zone: UTC+5:00

Kauchuk (Russian: Каучук) is a rural locality (a railway station) in Tchaikovsky, Perm Krai, Russia. The population was 186 as of 2010.
