= Gurina, Yogvinskoye Rural Settlement, Kudymkarsky District, Perm Krai =

Gurina Гурина
- Village
- Location within Perm Krai Location within Russia
- Coordinates: 59°11′N 54°40′E
- Country: Russia
- Region: Perm Krai
- District: Kudymkarsky District
- Time zone: UTC+5:00

Gurina (Russian: Гурина) is a rural locality (a village) in Yogvinskoye Rural Settlement, Kudymkarsky District, Perm Krai, Russia. The population was 314 as of 2010.

== Geography ==
It is located 22 km north from Kudymkar.
