= Podsludnoye =

Podsludnoye Подслудное
- Selo
- Location within Perm Krai Location within Russia
- Coordinates: 59°18′N 57°11′E
- Country: Russia
- Region: Perm Krai
- District: Alexandrovsky District
- Time zone: UTC+5:00

Podsludnoye (Russian: Подслудное) is a rural locality (a selo) in Yayvinskoye Urban Settlement, Alexandrovsky District, Perm Krai, Russia. The population was 14 as of 2010.

== Geography ==
Podsludnoye is located on the Yayva River, 41 km northwest of Alexandrovsk (the district's administrative centre) by road. Nizhnyaya is the nearest rural locality.
