= Bolshaya Vilva =

Bolshaya Vilva Большая Вильва
- Village
- Location within Perm Krai Location within Russia
- Coordinates: 59°09′N 57°23′E
- Country: Russia
- Region: Perm Krai
- District: Alexandrovsky District
- Time zone: UTC+5:00

Bolshaya Vilva (Russian: Большая Вильва) is a rural locality (a village) in Vsevolodo-Vilvenskoye Urban Settlement, Alexandrovsky District, Perm Krai, Russia. The population was 2 as of 2010. There are 3 streets.

== Geography ==
Bolshaya Vilva is located 21 km west of Alexandrovsk (the district's administrative centre) by road. Vsevolodo-Vilva is the nearest rural locality.
