= Mishurna =

Mishurna Мишурна
- Village
- Location within Perm Krai Location within Russia
- Coordinates: 58°13′N 56°17′E
- Country: Russia
- Region: Perm Krai
- District: Permsky District
- Time zone: UTC+5:00

Mishurna (Russian: Мишурна) is a rural locality (a village) in Khokhlovskoye Rural Settlement, Permsky District, Perm Krai, Russia. The population was 19 as of 2010. There are 2 streets.

== Geography ==
Mishurna is located 42 km north of Perm (the district's administrative centre) by road. Skobelevka is the nearest rural locality.
