= Garnova =

Garnova Гарнова
- Village
- Location within Perm Krai Location within Russia
- Coordinates: 59°10′N 57°08′E
- Country: Russia
- Region: Perm Krai
- District: Alexandrovsky District
- Time zone: UTC+5:00

Garnova (Russian: Гарнова) is a rural locality (a village) in Vsevolodo-Vilvenskoye Urban Settlement, Alexandrovsky District, Perm Krai, Russia. The population was 8 as of 2010. There is 1 street.

== Geography ==
Garnova is located 36 km west of Alexandrovsk (the district's administrative centre) by road. Shumkovo is the nearest rural locality.
