= Nagornsky =

Nagornsky Нагорнский
- Settlement
- Location within Perm Krai Location within Russia
- Coordinates: 58°46′N 57°32′E
- Country: Russia
- Region: Perm Krai
- District: Gubakhinsky Urban okrug
- Time zone: UTC+5:00

Nagornsky (Russian: Нагорнский) is a rural locality (a settlement) in Gubakhinsky Urban okrug, Perm Krai, Russia. The population was 477 as of 2010. There are 41 streets.

== Geography ==
It is located 9 km south of Gubakha (the district's administrative centre) by road. Nagornaya is the nearest rural locality.
