= Bashmaki =

Bashmaki Башмаки
- Settlement
- Location within Perm Krai Location within Russia
- Coordinates: 59°03′N 57°30′E
- Country: Russia
- Region: Perm Krai
- District: Alexandrovsky District
- Time zone: UTC+5:00

Bashmaki (Russian: Башмаки) is a rural locality (a settlement) in Alexandrovskoye Urban Settlement, Alexandrovsky District, Perm Krai, Russia. The population was 34 as of 2010. There are 6 streets.

== Geography ==
Bashmaki is located 22 km southwest of Alexandrovsk (the district's administrative centre) by road. Rasik is the nearest rural locality.
