= Sevastyany =

Sevastyany Севастьяны
- Village
- Location within Perm Krai Location within Russia
- Coordinates: 57°54′N 55°58′E
- Country: Russia
- Region: Perm Krai
- District: Permsky District
- Time zone: UTC+5:00

Sevastyany (Russian: Севастьяны) is a rural locality (a village) in Kultayevskoye Rural Settlement, Permsky District, Perm Krai, Russia. The population was 12 as of 2010. There are 2 streets.

== Geography ==
Sevastyany is located 22 km southwest of Perm (the district's administrative centre) by road. Shumki is the nearest rural locality.
