= Gusyata =

Gusyata Гусята
- Village
- Location within Perm Krai Location within Russia
- Coordinates: 57°53′N 56°04′E
- Country: Russia
- Region: Perm Krai
- District: Permsky District
- Time zone: UTC+5:00

Gusyata (Russian: Гусята) is a rural locality (a village) in Gamovskoye Rural Settlement, Permsky District, Perm Krai, Russia. The population was 5 as of 2010.

== Geography ==
Gusyata is located 22 km southwest of Perm (the district's administrative centre) by road. Strashnaya is the nearest rural locality.
