= Alexiki =

Alexiki Алексики
- Village
- Location within Perm Krai Location within Russia
- Coordinates: 57°54′N 55°45′E
- Country: Russia
- Region: Perm Krai
- District: Permsky District
- Time zone: UTC+5:00

Alexiki (Russian: Алексики) is a rural locality (a village) in Zabolotskoye Rural Settlement, Permsky District, Perm Krai, Russia. The population was 16 as of 2010. There are 2 streets.

== Geography ==
Alexiki is located 37 km southwest of Perm (the district's administrative centre) by road. Tishkino is the nearest rural locality.
