= Bereg Kamy (Kondratovskoye Rural Settlement), Permsky District, Perm Krai =

Bereg Kamy Берег Камы
- Village
- Location within Perm Krai Location within Russia
- Coordinates: 58°00′N 56°02′E
- Country: Russia
- Region: Perm Krai
- District: Permsky District
- Time zone: UTC+5:00

Bereg Kamy (Russian: Берег Камы) is a rural locality (a village) in Kondratovskoye Rural Settlement, Permsky District, Perm Krai, Russia. The population was 80 as of 2010. There are 21 streets.
