= Yezhi =

Yezhi Ежи
- Village
- Location within Perm Krai Location within Russia
- Coordinates: 57°55′N 55°51′E
- Country: Russia
- Region: Perm Krai
- District: Permsky District
- Time zone: UTC+5:00

Yezhi (Russian: Ежи) is a rural locality (a village) in Kultayevskoye Rural Settlement, Permsky District, Perm Krai, Russia. The population was 67 as of 2010. There are 9 streets.

== Geography ==
Yezhi is located 28 km southwest of Perm (the district's administrative centre) by road. Nizhniye Mully is the nearest rural locality.
