= Stashkovo =

Stashkovo Сташково
- Selo
- Location within Perm Krai Location within Russia
- Coordinates: 57°33′N 55°34′E
- Country: Russia
- Region: Perm Krai
- District: Permsky District
- Time zone: UTC+5:00

Stashkovo (Russian: Сташково) is a rural locality (a selo) in Yugo-Kamskoye Rural Settlement, Permsky District, Perm Krai, Russia. The population was 119 as of 2010. There are five streets.

== Geography ==
Stashkovo is located 83 km southwest of Perm (the district's administrative centre) by road. Chyornaya is the nearest rural locality.
