= Syola =

Syola Сёла
- Selo
- Nickname: деревня
- Location within Perm Krai Location within Russia
- Coordinates: 58°09′N 57°14′E
- Country: Russia
- Region: Perm Krai
- District: Chusovoy Urban Okrug
- Time zone: UTC+5:00
- Postal code: 618222
- Website: syola.ru

Syola (Russian: Сёла) is a rural locality (a selo) and the administrative center of Syolskoye Rural Settlement, Chusovoy Urban Okrug, Perm Krai, Russia. The population was 724 as of 2010. There are 9 streets.

== Geography ==
Syola is located 65 km southwest of Chusovoy. Bereznik is the nearest rural locality.
