= Gurina, Verkh-Invenskoye Rural Settlement, Kudymkarsky District, Perm Krai =

Gurina Гурина
- Village
- Location within Perm Krai Location within Russia
- Coordinates: 58°58′N 54°23′E
- Country: Russia
- Region: Perm Krai
- District: Kudymkarsky District
- Time zone: UTC+5:00

Gurina (Russian: Гурина) is a rural locality (a village) in Verkh-Invenskoye Rural Settlement, Kudymkarsky District, Perm Krai, Russia. The population was 34 as of 2010.

== Geography ==
It is located 20 km west from Kudymkar.
