= Bolshaya Mos =

Bolshaya Mos Большая Мось
- Village
- Location within Perm Krai Location within Russia
- Coordinates: 57°56′N 56°21′E
- Country: Russia
- Region: Perm Krai
- District: Permsky District
- Time zone: UTC+5:00

Bolshaya Mos (Russian: Большая Мось) is a rural locality (a village) in Frolovskoye Rural Settlement, Permsky District, Perm Krai, Russia. The population was 141 as of 2010. There are 62 streets.

== Geography ==
Bolshaya Mos is located 15 km southeast of Perm (the district's administrative centre) by road. Martyanovo is the nearest rural locality.
