= Lozhki, Perm Krai =

Lozhki Ложки
- Village
- Location within Perm Krai Location within Russia
- Coordinates: 57°55′N 55°50′E
- Country: Russia
- Region: Perm Krai
- District: Permsky District
- Time zone: UTC+5:00

Lozhki (Russian: Ложки) is a rural locality (a village) in Kultayevskoye Rural Settlement, Permsky District, Perm Krai, Russia. The population was 2 as of 2010. There are 3 streets.

== Geography ==
Lozhki is located 30 km southwest of Perm (the district's administrative centre) by road. Yezhi is the nearest rural locality.
