= Romanyata =

Romanyata Романята
- Village
- Location within Perm Krai Location within Russia
- Coordinates: 56°46′N 54°46′E
- Country: Russia
- Region: Perm Krai
- District: Chaykovsky
- Time zone: UTC+5:00

Romanyata (Russian: Романята) is a rural locality (a village) in Chaykovsky, Perm Krai, Russia. The population was 271 as of 2010.

== Geography ==
Romanyata is located 53 km east of Chaykovsky. Gorodishche is the nearest rural locality.
