= Gribanovo =

Gribanovo Грибаново
- Village
- Location within Perm Krai Location within Russia
- Coordinates: 57°48′N 56°20′E
- Country: Russia
- Region: Perm Krai
- District: Permsky District
- Time zone: UTC+5:00

Gribanovo (Russian: Грибаново) is a rural locality (a village) in Lobanovskoye Rural Settlement, Permsky District, Perm Krai, Russia. The population was 10 as of 2010. There is 1 street.

== Geography ==
Gribanovo is located 30 km south of Perm (the district's administrative centre) by road. Maly Burtym is the nearest rural locality.
