= Vizhay =

Vizhay Вижай
- Settlement
- Location within Perm Krai Location within Russia
- Coordinates: 58°28′N 58°39′E
- Country: Russia
- Region: Perm Krai
- District: Gornozavodsky District
- Time zone: UTC+5:00

Vizhay (Russian: Вижай) is a rural locality (a settlement) in Gornozavodsky District, Perm Krai, Russia. The population was 207 as of 2010. There are 13 streets.
