= Bolshoy Bukor =

Bolshoy Bukor Большой Букор
- Selo
- Flag

- Location within Perm Krai Location within Russia
- Coordinates: 56°40′N 54°15′E
- Country: Russia
- Region: Perm Krai
- District: Chaykovsky
- Time zone: UTC+5:00

Bolshoy Bukor (Russian: Большой Букор) is a rural locality (a selo) and the administrative center of Bolshebukorskoye Rural Settlement, Chaykovsky, Perm Krai, Russia. The population was 996 as of 2010. There are 11 streets.

== Geography ==
Bolshoy Bukor is located 19 km southeast of Chaykovsky. Maly Bukor is the nearest rural locality.
