= Gora, Permsky District, Perm Krai =

Gora Гора
- Village
- Location within Perm Krai Location within Russia
- Coordinates: 58°15′N 56°15′E
- Country: Russia
- Region: Perm Krai
- District: Permsky District
- Time zone: UTC+5:00

Gora (Russian: Гора) is a rural locality (a village) in Khokhlovskoye Rural Settlement, Permsky District, Perm Krai, Russia. The population was 11 as of 2010. There are eight streets.

== Geography ==
Gora is located 45 km north of Perm (the district's administrative centre) by road. Khokhlovka is the nearest rural locality.
