= Kasimovo, Perm Krai =

Kasimovo Касимово
- Village
- Location within Perm Krai Location within Russia
- Coordinates: 57°48′N 56°13′E
- Country: Russia
- Region: Perm Krai
- District: Permsky District
- Time zone: UTC+5:00

Kasimovo (Russian: Касимово) is a rural locality (a village) in Lobanovskoye Rural Settlement, Permsky District, Perm Krai, Russia. The population was 317 as of 2010. There are 6 streets.

== Geography ==
Kasimovo is located 34 km south of Perm (the district's administrative centre) by road. Baskiye is the nearest rural locality.
