= Taly =

Taly Талый
- Settlement
- Location within Perm Krai Location within Russia
- Coordinates: 59°08′N 57°47′E
- Country: Russia
- Region: Perm Krai
- District: Alexandrovsky District
- Time zone: UTC+5:00

Taly (Russian: Талый) is a rural locality (a settlement) in Alexandrovskoye Urban Settlement, Alexandrovsky District, Perm Krai, Russia. The population was 17 as of 2010. There are 11 streets.

== Geography ==
Taly is located 26 km southeast of Alexandrovsk (the district's administrative centre) by road. Severny Kospashsky is the nearest rural locality.
