= Protasy, Perm Krai =

Protasy Протасы
- Settlement
- Location within Perm Krai Location within Russia
- Coordinates: 57°52′N 55°49′E
- Country: Russia
- Region: Perm Krai
- District: Permsky District
- Time zone: UTC+5:00

Protasy (Russian: Протасы) is a rural locality (a settlement) in Kultayevskoye Rural Settlement, Permsky District, Perm Krai, Russia. The population was 240 as of 2010. There are 89 streets.

== Geography ==
Protasy is located 32 km southwest of Perm (the district's administrative centre) by road. Verkhniye Protasy is the nearest rural locality.
