= Sakmary =

Sakmary Сакмары
- Village
- Location within Perm Krai Location within Russia
- Coordinates: 57°52′N 56°05′E
- Country: Russia
- Region: Perm Krai
- District: Permsky District
- Time zone: UTC+5:00

Sakmary (Russian: Сакмары) is a rural locality (a village) in Gamovskoye Rural Settlement, Permsky District, Perm Krai, Russia. The population was 31 as of 2010. There are 2 streets.

== Geography ==
Sakmary is located 21 km southwest of Perm (the district's administrative centre) by road. Gamovo is the nearest rural locality.
