= Malinovka, Perm Krai =

Malinovka Малиновка
- Village
- Location within Perm Krai Location within Russia
- Coordinates: 57°33′N 54°05′E
- Country: Russia
- Region: Perm Krai
- District: Bolshesosnovsky District
- Time zone: UTC+5:00

Malinovka (Russian: Малиновка) is a rural locality (a village) in Petropavlovskoye Rural Settlement, Bolshesosnovsky District, Perm Krai, Russia. The population was 15 as of 2010. There is 1 street.
