= Bolshoy Burtym =

Bolshoy Burtym Большой Буртым
- Village
- Location within Perm Krai Location within Russia
- Coordinates: 57°50′N 56°18′E
- Country: Russia
- Region: Perm Krai
- District: Permsky District
- Time zone: UTC+5:00

Bolshoy Burtym (Russian: Большой Буртым) is a rural locality (a village) in Lobanovskoye Rural Settlement, Permsky District, Perm Krai, Russia. The population was 95 as of 2010. There is 1 street.

== Geography ==
Bolshoy Burtym is located 20 km south of Perm (the district's administrative centre) by road. Lobanovo is the nearest rural locality.
