= Vashury =

Vashury Вашуры
- Village
- Location within Perm Krai Location within Russia
- Coordinates: 57°54′N 56°19′E
- Country: Russia
- Region: Perm Krai
- District: Permsky District
- Time zone: UTC+5:00

Vashury (Russian: Вашуры) is a rural locality (a village) in Frolovskoye Rural Settlement, Permsky District, Perm Krai, Russia. The population was 4 as of 2010. There is 1 street.

== Geography ==
Vashury is located 15 km southeast of Perm (the district's administrative centre) by road. Deriby is the nearest rural locality.
