= Kichanovo =

Kichanovo Кичаново
- Village
- Location within Perm Krai Location within Russia
- Coordinates: 57°54′N 55°59′E
- Country: Russia
- Region: Perm Krai
- District: Permsky District
- Time zone: UTC+5:00

Kichanovo (Russian: Кичаново) is a rural locality (a village) in Kultayevskoye Rural Settlement, Permsky District, Perm Krai, Russia. The population was 432 as of 2010. There are 14 streets.

== Geography ==
Kichanovo is located 20 km southwest of Perm (the district's administrative centre) by road. Bolshoye Savino is the nearest rural locality.
