= Malaya, Perm Krai =

Malaya Малая
- Village
- Location within Perm Krai Location within Russia
- Coordinates: 58°04′N 56°37′E
- Country: Russia
- Region: Perm Krai
- District: Permsky District
- Time zone: UTC+5:00

Malaya (Russian: Малая) is a rural locality (a village) in Sylvenskoye Rural Settlement, Permsky District, Perm Krai, Russia. The population was 444 as of 2010. There are 15 streets.

== Geography ==
Malaya is located 30 km east of Perm (the district's administrative centre) by road. Lyady is the nearest rural locality.
