= Samarova =

Samarova Самарова
- Village
- Interactive map of Samarova
- Location of Samarova Samarova (Perm Krai)
- Coordinates: 56°41′N 56°45′E
- Country: Russia
- Federal subject: Perm Krai
- Administrative district: Oktyabrsky District

Population
  - Estimate (2021): 209 )
- Time zone: UTC+5 (MSK+2)
- Postal code: 617877
- OKTMO ID: 57636428106

Samarova (Russian: Сама́рова) is a rural locality (a village) in Oktyabrsky District of Perm Krai, Russia.

A hydrogen sulfide rill known as Manchebay flows between Ishimovo and Samarova. According to the local lore, an elder healer known as Mukhamak used to live here. An old wooden barrel in which visitors bathed is all that remains to corroborate this story.
