= Savenki =

Savenki Савенки
- Village
- Location within Perm Krai Location within Russia
- Coordinates: 57°51′N 56°06′E
- Country: Russia
- Region: Perm Krai
- District: Permsky District
- Time zone: UTC+5:00

Savenki (Russian: Савенки) is a rural locality (a village) in Gamovskoye Rural Settlement, Permsky District, Perm Krai, Russia. The population was 16 as of 2010.

== Geography ==
Savenki is located 24 km southwest of Perm (the district's administrative centre) by road. Shulgino is the nearest rural locality.
