= Plishki =

Plishki Плишки
- Village
- Location within Perm Krai Location within Russia
- Coordinates: 57°55′N 56°17′E
- Country: Russia
- Region: Perm Krai
- District: Permsky District
- Time zone: UTC+5:00

Plishki (Russian: Плишки) is a rural locality (a village) in Frolovskoye Rural Settlement, Permsky District, Perm Krai, Russia. The population was 11 as of 2010. There are four streets.

== Geography ==
Plishki is located 12 km south of Perm (the district's administrative centre) by road. Froly is the nearest rural locality.
