= Sukho-Platoshino =

Sukho-Platoshino Сухо-Платошино
- Village
- Location within Perm Krai Location within Russia
- Coordinates: 57°36′N 56°29′E
- Country: Russia
- Region: Perm Krai
- District: Permsky District
- Time zone: UTC+5:00

Sukho-Platoshino (Russian: Сухо-Платошино) is a rural locality (a village) in Platoshinskoye Rural Settlement, Permsky District, Perm Krai, Russia. The population was 12 as of 2010. There is 1 street.

== Geography ==
Sukho-Platoshino is located 52 km south of Perm (the district's administrative centre) by road. Baybolovka is the nearest rural locality.
