= Malaya Vilva =

Malaya Vilva Малая Вильва
- Village
- Location within Perm Krai Location within Russia
- Coordinates: 59°05′N 57°25′E
- Country: Russia
- Region: Perm Krai
- District: Alexandrovsky District
- Time zone: UTC+5:00

Malaya Vilva (Russian: Малая Вильва) is a rural locality (a village) in Alexandrovskoye Urban Settlement, Alexandrovsky District, Perm Krai, Russia. The population was 4 as of 2010. There are 2 streets.

== Geography ==
Malaya Vilva is located 15 km southwest of Alexandrovsk (the district's administrative centre) by road. Ust-Lytva is the nearest rural locality.
