= Dvortsovaya Sludka =

Dvortsovaya Sludka Дворцовая Слудка
- Village
- Location within Perm Krai Location within Russia
- Coordinates: 57°59′N 55°47′E
- Country: Russia
- Region: Perm Krai
- District: Permsky District
- Time zone: UTC+5:00

Dvortsovaya Sludka (Russian: Дворцовая Слудка) is a rural locality (a village) in Ust-Kachkinskoye Rural Settlement, Permsky District, Perm Krai, Russia. The population was 15 as of 2010. There are 8 streets.

== Geography ==
Dvortsovaya Sludka is located 48 km west of Perm (the district's administrative centre) by road. Kachka is the nearest rural locality.
