= Osentsy =

Osentsy Осенцы
- Village
- Location within Perm Krai Location within Russia
- Coordinates: 57°53′N 56°06′E
- Country: Russia
- Region: Perm Krai
- District: Permsky District
- Time zone: UTC+5:00

Osentsy (Russian: Осенцы) is a rural locality (a village) in Gamovskoye Rural Settlement, Permsky District, Perm Krai, Russia. The population was 137 as of 2010. There are 2 streets.

== Geography ==
Osentsy is located on the Chechera River, 19 km southwest of Perm (the district's administrative centre) by road. Yermashi is the nearest rural locality.
