= Konanova =

Konanova Конанова
- Village
- Location within Perm Krai Location within Russia
- Coordinates: 59°11′N 54°45′E
- Country: Russia
- Region: Perm Krai
- District: Kudymkarsky District
- Time zone: UTC+5:00

Konanova (Russian: Конанова) is a rural locality (a village) in Oshibskoye Rural Settlement, Kudymkarsky District, Perm Krai, Russia with just 3 streets, and as of 2010, a population of 210. Konanova is located 25 km northeast of Kudymkar (the district's administrative centre) by road. Osipova is the nearest rural locality.
