= Pikhtovka =

Pikhtovka Пихтовка
- Village
- Location within Perm Krai Location within Russia
- Coordinates: 59°07′N 54°06′E
- Country: Russia
- Region: Perm Krai
- District: Kudymkarsky District
- Time zone: UTC+5:00

Pikhtovka (Russian: Пихтовка) is a rural locality (a village) in Beloyevskoye Rural Settlement, Kudymkarsky District, Perm Krai, Russia. The population was 71 as of 2010. There are 3 streets.

== Geography ==
Pikhtovka is located 44 km northwest of Kudymkar (the district's administrative centre) by road. Bolshaya Sidorova is the nearest rural locality.
