= Kuva, Perm Krai =

Kuva Кува
- Selo
- Location within Perm Krai Location within Russia
- Coordinates: 59°07′N 54°10′E
- Country: Russia
- Region: Perm Krai
- District: Kudymkarsky District
- Time zone: UTC+5:00

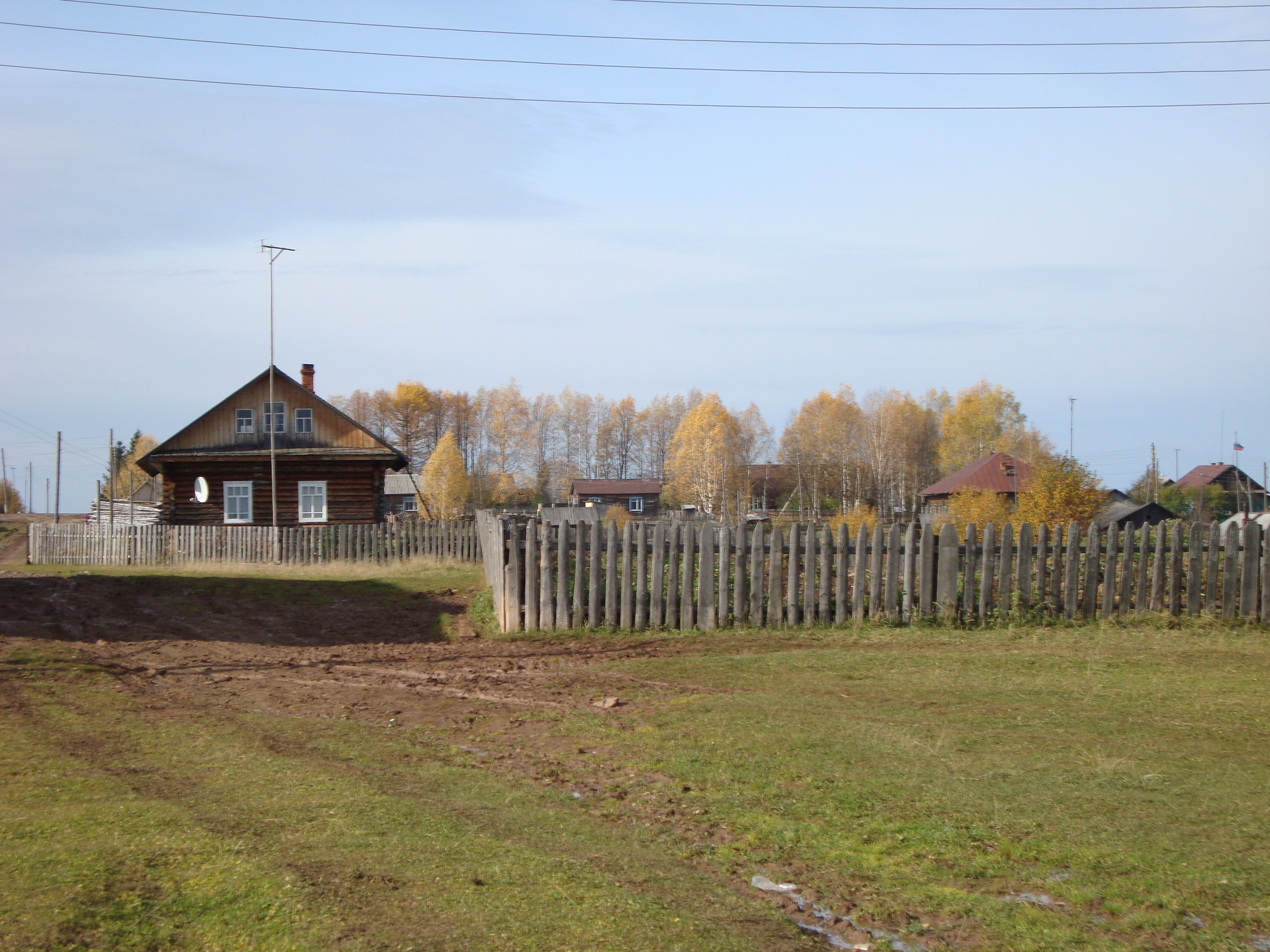
Kuva

Kuva (Russian: Кува) is a rural locality (a selo) in Beloyevskoye Rural Settlement, Kudymkarsky District, Perm Krai, Russia. The population was 1,158 as of 2010. There are 25 streets.

== Geography ==
Kuva is located 39 km northwest of Kudymkar (the district's administrative centre) by road. Vazh-Pashnya is the nearest rural locality.
