= Staraya Shlyapina =

Staraya Shlyapina Старая Шляпина
- Village
- Location within Perm Krai Location within Russia
- Coordinates: 59°15′N 55°04′E
- Country: Russia
- Region: Perm Krai
- District: Kudymkarsky District
- Time zone: UTC+5:00

Staraya Shlyapina (Russian: Старая Шляпина) is a rural locality (a village) in Oshibskoye Rural Settlement, Kudymkarsky District, Perm Krai, Russia. The population was 82 as of 2010.

== Geography ==
Staraya Shlyapina is located 44 km northeast of Kudymkar (the district's administrative centre) by road. Novaya Shlyapina is the nearest rural locality.
