= Syuz-Pozya =

Syuz-Pozya Сюзь-Позья
- Village
- Location within Perm Krai Location within Russia
- Coordinates: 59°11′N 54°52′E
- Country: Russia
- Region: Perm Krai
- District: Kudymkarsky District
- Time zone: UTC+5:00

Syuz-Pozya (Russian: Сюзь-Позья) is a rural locality (a village) in Oshibskoye Rural Settlement, Kudymkarsky District, Perm Krai, Russia. The population was 161 as of 2010. There are 7 streets.

== Geography ==
Syuz-Pozya is located 31 km northeast of Kudymkar (the district's administrative centre) by road. Kosva is the nearest rural locality.
