= Sergeyeva, Kudymkarsky District, Perm Krai =

Sergeyeva Сергеева
- Village
- Location within Perm Krai Location within Russia
- Coordinates: 59°02′N 54°23′E
- Country: Russia
- Region: Perm Krai
- District: Kudymkarsky District
- Time zone: UTC+5:00

Sergeyeva (Russian: Сергеева) is a rural locality (a village) in Beloyevskoye Rural Settlement, Kudymkarsky District, Perm Krai, Russia. The population was 12 as of 2010.

== Geography ==
Sergeyeva is located 34 km northwest of Kudymkar (the district's administrative centre) by road. Alexandrova is the nearest rural locality.
