= Nikolichi =

Nikolichi Николичи
- Village
- Location within Perm Krai Location within Russia
- Coordinates: 59°08′N 54°26′E
- Country: Russia
- Region: Perm Krai
- District: Kudymkarsky District
- Time zone: UTC+5:00

Nikolichi (Russian: Николичи) is a rural locality (a village) in Beloyevskoye Rural Settlement, Kudymkarsky District, Perm Krai, Russia. The population was 13 as of 2010.

== Geography ==
Nikolichi is located 23 km northwest of Kudymkar (the district's administrative centre) by road. Brazhkina is the nearest rural locality.
