= Yermakova, Perm Krai =

Yermakova Ермакова
- Village
- Location within Perm Krai Location within Russia
- Coordinates: 59°09′N 54°41′E
- Country: Russia
- Region: Perm Krai
- District: Kudymkarsky District
- Time zone: UTC+5:00

Yermakova (Russian: Ермакова) is a rural locality (a village) in Yorgvinskoye Rural Settlement, Kudymkarsky District, Perm Krai, Russia. The population was 60 as of 2010.

== Geography ==
Yermakova is located 19 km north of Kudymkar (the district's administrative centre) by road. Mizhuyeva is the nearest rural locality.
