= Derskanova =

Derskanova Дерсканова
- Village
- Location within Perm Krai Location within Russia
- Coordinates: 59°03′N 54°52′E
- Country: Russia
- Region: Perm Krai
- District: Kudymkarsky District
- Time zone: UTC+5:00

Derskanova (Russian: Дерсканова) is a rural locality (a village) in Yorgvinskoye Rural Settlement, Kudymkarsky District, Perm Krai, Russia. The population was 28 as of 2010.

== Geography ==
Derskanova is located 28 km northeast of Kudymkar (the district's administrative centre) by road. Shaburova is the nearest rural locality.
