= Chashchilova =

Chashchilova Чащилова
- Village
- Location within Perm Krai Location within Russia
- Coordinates: 59°05′N 54°45′E
- Country: Russia
- Region: Perm Krai
- District: Kudymkarsky District
- Time zone: UTC+5:00

Chashchilova (Russian: Чащилова) is a rural locality (a village) in Yorgvinskoye Rural Settlement, Kudymkarsky District, Perm Krai, Russia. The population was 113 as of 2010. There are 14 streets.

== Geography ==
Chashchilova is located 10 km northeast of Kudymkar (the district's administrative centre) by road. Porskokova is the nearest rural locality.
