= Mosheva =

Mosheva Мошева
- Village
- Location within Perm Krai Location within Russia
- Coordinates: 59°04′N 54°33′E
- Country: Russia
- Region: Perm Krai
- District: Kudymkarsky District
- Time zone: UTC+5:00

Mosheva (Russian: Мошева) is a rural locality (a village) in Beloyevskoye Rural Settlement, Kudymkarsky District, Perm Krai, Russia. The population was 160 as of 2010. There are 6 streets.

== Geography ==
Mosheva is located 12 km northwest of Kudymkar (the district's administrative centre) by road. Yegichi is the nearest rural locality.
