= Vaseva, Perm Krai =

Vaseva Васева
- Village
- Location within Perm Krai Location within Russia
- Coordinates: 58°55′N 54°24′E
- Country: Russia
- Region: Perm Krai
- District: Kudymkarsky District
- Time zone: UTC+5:00

Vaseva (Russian: Васева) is a rural locality (a village) in Verkh-Invenskoye Rural Settlement, Kudymkarsky District, Perm Krai, Russia. The population was 88 as of 2010. There are 7 streets.

== Geography ==
Vaseva is located 20 km southwest of Kudymkar (the district's administrative centre) by road. Leleva is the nearest rural locality.
