= Zyulganova =

Zyulganova Зюльганова
- Village
- Location within Perm Krai Location within Russia
- Coordinates: 59°03′N 54°41′E
- Country: Russia
- Region: Perm Krai
- District: Kudymkarsky District
- Time zone: UTC+5:00

Zyulganova (Russian: Зюльганова) is a rural locality (a village) in Stepanovskoye Rural Settlement, Kudymkarsky District, Perm Krai, Russia. The population was 125 as of 2010. There are five streets.

== Geography ==
Zyulganova is located 5 km northeast of Kudymkar (the district's administrative centre) by road. Bolshaya Serva is the nearest rural locality.
