= Porskokova =

Porskokova Порськокова
- Village
- Location within Perm Krai Location within Russia
- Coordinates: 59°05′N 54°44′E
- Country: Russia
- Region: Perm Krai
- District: Kudymkarsky District
- Time zone: UTC+5:00

Porskokova (Russian: Порськокова) is a rural locality (a village) in Yorgvinskoye Rural Settlement, Kudymkarsky District, Perm Krai, Russia. The population was 126 as of 2010. There are 11 streets.

== Geography ==
Porskokova is located 11 km northeast of Kudymkar (the district's administrative centre) by road. Chashchilova is the nearest rural locality.
