= Sharvol =

Sharvol Шарволь
- Settlement
- Location within Perm Krai Location within Russia
- Coordinates: 59°19′N 55°13′E
- Country: Russia
- Region: Perm Krai
- District: Kudymkarsky District
- Time zone: UTC+5:00

Sharvol (Russian: Шарволь) is a rural locality (a settlement) in Oshibskoye Rural Settlement, Kudymkarsky District, Perm Krai, Russia. The population was 19 as of 2010.

== Geography ==
Sharvol is located 57 km northeast of Kudymkar (the district's administrative centre) by road. Savina is the nearest rural locality.
