= Verkh-Buzhdom =

Verkh-Buzhdom Верх-Буждом
- Settlement
- Location within Perm Krai Location within Russia
- Coordinates: 59°02′N 54°02′E
- Country: Russia
- Region: Perm Krai
- District: Kudymkarsky District
- Time zone: UTC+5:00

Verkh-Buzhdom (Russian: Верх-Буждом) is a rural locality (a settlement) in Verkh-Invenskoye Rural Settlement, Kudymkarsky District, Perm Krai, Russia. The population was 265 as of 2010. There are 19 streets.

== Geography ==
Verkh-Buzhdom is located 52 km west of Kudymkar (the district's administrative centre) by road. Ganina is the nearest rural locality.
