= Pidayeva =

Pidayeva Пидаева
- Village
- Location within Perm Krai Location within Russia
- Coordinates: 58°56′N 54°40′E
- Country: Russia
- Region: Perm Krai
- District: Kudymkarsky District
- Time zone: UTC+5:00

Pidayeva (Russian: Пидаева) is a rural locality (a village) in Stepanovskoye Rural Settlement, Kudymkarsky District, Perm Krai, Russia. The population was 59 as of 2010. There are five streets.

== Geography ==
Pidayeva is located 9 km south of Kudymkar (the district's administrative centre) by road. Kekur is the nearest rural locality.
