= Pruddor =

Pruddor Пруддор
- Village
- Location within Perm Krai Location within Russia
- Coordinates: 59°07′N 54°29′E
- Country: Russia
- Region: Perm Krai
- District: Kudymkarsky District
- Time zone: UTC+5:00

Pruddor (Russian: Пруддор) is a rural locality (a village) in Beloyevskoye Rural Settlement, Kudymkarsky District, Perm Krai, Russia. The population was 65 as of 2010. There are 4 streets.

== Geography ==
Pruddor is located 19 km northwest of Kudymkar (the district's administrative centre) by road. Beloyevo is the nearest rural locality.
