= Sergina =

Sergina Сергина
- Village
- Location within Perm Krai Location within Russia
- Coordinates: 58°57′N 54°37′E
- Country: Russia
- Region: Perm Krai
- District: Kudymkarsky District
- Time zone: UTC+5:00

Sergina (Russian: Сергина) is a rural locality (a village) in Stepanovskoye Rural Settlement, Kudymkarsky District, Perm Krai, Russia. The population was 14 as of 2010. There are 2 streets.

== Geography ==
Sergina is located 9 km southwest of Kudymkar (the district's administrative centre) by road. Pochkina is the nearest rural locality.
