= Patrukova =

Patrukova Патрукова
- Village
- Location within Perm Krai Location within Russia
- Coordinates: 59°15′N 54°56′E
- Country: Russia
- Region: Perm Krai
- District: Kudymkarsky District
- Time zone: UTC+5:00

Patrukova (Russian: Патрукова) is a rural locality (a village) in Oshibskoye Rural Settlement, Kudymkarsky District, Perm Krai, Russia. The population was 106 as of 2010. There are 3 streets.

== Geography ==
Patrukova is located 37 km northeast of Kudymkar (the district's administrative centre) by road. Petukhova is the nearest rural locality.
