= Yunga, Perm Krai =

Yunga Юньга
- Village
- Location within Perm Krai Location within Russia
- Coordinates: 58°57′N 54°09′E
- Country: Russia
- Region: Perm Krai
- District: Kudymkarsky District
- Time zone: UTC+5:00

Yunga (Russian: Юньга) is a rural locality (a village) in Verkh-Invenskoye Rural Settlement, Kudymkarsky District, Perm Krai, Russia. The population was 95 as of 2010. There are five streets.

== Geography ==
Yunga is located 38 km southwest of Kudymkar (the district's administrative centre) by road.
