= Uchkhoz =

Uchkhoz Учхоз
- Village
- Location within Perm Krai Location within Russia
- Coordinates: 59°04′N 54°40′E
- Country: Russia
- Region: Perm Krai
- District: Kudymkarsky District
- Time zone: UTC+5:00

Uchkhoz (Russian: Учхоз) is a rural locality (a village) in Stepanovskoye Rural Settlement, Kudymkarsky District, Perm Krai, Russia. The population was 68 as of 2010. There are 4 streets.

== Geography ==
Uchkhoz is located 7 km north of Kudymkar (the district's administrative centre) by road. Zyulganova is the nearest rural locality.
