= Devina, Perm Krai =

Danshina Девина
- Village
- Location within Perm Krai Location within Russia
- Coordinates: 59°15′N 54°46′E
- Country: Russia
- Region: Perm Krai
- District: Kudymkarsky District
- Time zone: UTC+5:00

Devina (Russian: Девина) is a rural locality (a village) in Oshibskoye Rural Settlement, Kudymkarsky District, Perm Krai, Russia. The population was 37 as of 2010.

== Geography ==
Devina is located 37 km southwest of Kudymkar (the district's administrative centre) by road.
