= Tikhy =

Tikhy Тихий
- Settlement
- Location within Perm Krai Location within Russia
- Coordinates: 59°00′N 54°37′E
- Country: Russia
- Region: Perm Krai
- District: Kudymkarsky District
- Time zone: UTC+5:00

Tikhy (Russian: Тихий) is a rural locality (a settlement) in Stepanovskoye Rural Settlement, Kudymkarsky District, Perm Krai, Russia. The population was 335 as of 2010. There are 7 streets.

== Geography ==
Tikhy is located 4 km west of Kudymkar (the district's administrative centre) by road. Kudymkar is the nearest rural locality.
