= Kharina =

Kharina Харина
- Village
- Location within Perm Krai Location within Russia
- Coordinates: 59°01′N 54°47′E
- Country: Russia
- Region: Perm Krai
- District: Kudymkarsky District
- Time zone: UTC+5:00

Kharina (Russian: Харина) is a rural locality (a village) in Stepanovskoye Rural Settlement, Kudymkarsky District, Perm Krai, Russia. The population was 126 as of 2010. There are 9 streets.

== Geography ==
Kharina is located 8 km east of Kudymkar (the district's administrative centre) by road. Lopatina is the nearest rural locality.
