= Yegichi =

Yegichi Егичи
- Village
- Location within Perm Krai Location within Russia
- Coordinates: 59°05′N 54°34′E
- Country: Russia
- Region: Perm Krai
- District: Kudymkarsky District
- Time zone: UTC+5:00

Yegichi (Russian: Егичи) is a rural locality (a village) in Beloyevskoye Rural Settlement, Kudymkarsky District, Perm Krai, Russia. The population was 27 as of 2010.

== Geography ==
Yegichi is located 12 km northwest of Kudymkar (the district's administrative centre) by road. Mosheva is the nearest rural locality.
