= Piter, Kudymkarsky District, Perm Krai =

Piter Питер
- Village
- Location within Perm Krai Location within Russia
- Coordinates: 58°59′N 54°25′E
- Country: Russia
- Region: Perm Krai
- District: Kudymkarsky District
- Time zone: UTC+5:00

Piter (Russian: Питер) is a rural locality (a village) in Verkh-Invenskoye Rural Settlement, Kudymkarsky District, Perm Krai, Russia. The population was 27 as of 2010. There is one street.

== Geography ==
Piter is located 36 km (22 mi) west of Kudymkar (the district's administrative centre) by road. Gurina is the nearest rural locality.
