= Perkova =

Perkova Перкова
- Village
- Location within Perm Krai Location within Russia
- Coordinates: 59°10′N 54°24′E
- Country: Russia
- Region: Perm Krai
- District: Kudymkarsky District
- Time zone: UTC+5:00

Perkova (Russian: Перкова) is a rural locality (a village) in Beloyevskoye Rural Settlement, Kudymkarsky District, Perm Krai, Russia. The population was 121 as of 2010. There are four streets.

== Geography ==
Perkova is located 3 km (1.9 mi) south of Kudymkar (the district's administrative centre) by road.
