= Fadeyeva, Perm Krai =

Fadeyeva Фадеева
- Village
- Location within Perm Krai Location within Russia
- Coordinates: 59°15′N 54°45′E
- Country: Russia
- Region: Perm Krai
- District: Kudymkarsky District
- Time zone: UTC+5:00

Fadeyeva (Russian: Фадеева) is a rural locality (a village) in Oshibskoye Rural Settlement, Kudymkarsky District, Perm Krai, Russia. The population was 21 as of 2010.

== Geography ==
Fadeyeva is located 31 km north of Kudymkar (the district's administrative centre) by road. Baranova is the nearest rural locality.
