= Seleva =

Seleva Селева
- Village
- Location within Perm Krai Location within Russia
- Coordinates: 59°01′N 54°15′E
- Country: Russia
- Region: Perm Krai
- District: Kudymkarsky District
- Time zone: UTC+5:00

Seleva (Russian: Селева) is a rural locality (a village) in Verkh-Invenskoye Rural Settlement, Kudymkarsky District, Perm Krai, Russia. The population was 12 as of 2010. There is 1 street.

== Geography ==
Seleva is located 42 km west of Kudymkar (the district's administrative centre) by road. Yarasheva is the nearest rural locality.
