= Chakileva =

Chakileva Чакилева
- Village
- Location within Perm Krai Location within Russia
- Coordinates: 59°01′N 54°49′E
- Country: Russia
- Region: Perm Krai
- District: Kudymkarsky District
- Time zone: UTC+5:00

Chakileva (Russian: Чакилева) is a rural locality (a village) in Stepanovskoye Rural Settlement, Kudymkarsky District, Perm Krai, Russia. The population was 43 as of 2010. There are 7 streets.

== Geography ==
Chakileva is located 11 km east of Kudymkar (the district's administrative centre) by road. Lopatina is the nearest rural locality.
