= Demina, Perm Krai =

Demina Демина
- Village
- Location within Perm Krai Location within Russia
- Coordinates: 59°01′N 54°36′E
- Country: Russia
- Region: Perm Krai
- District: Kudymkarsky District
- Time zone: UTC+5:00

Demina (Russian: Демина) is a rural locality (a village) in Stepanovskoye Rural Settlement, Kudymkarsky District, Perm Krai, Russia. The population was 107 as of 2010. There are 8 streets.

== Geography ==
Demina is located 4 km northwest of Kudymkar (the district's administrative centre) by road. Kudymkar is the nearest rural locality.
