= Senkashor =

Senkashor Сенькашор
- Village
- Location within Perm Krai Location within Russia
- Coordinates: 59°10′N 54°45′E
- Country: Russia
- Region: Perm Krai
- District: Kudymkarsky District
- Time zone: UTC+5:00

Senkashor (Russian: Сенькашор) is a rural locality (a village) in Oshibskoye Rural Settlement, Kudymkarsky District, Perm Krai, Russia. The population was 5 as of 2010.

== Geography ==
Senkashor is located 24 km north of Kudymkar (the district's administrative centre) by road. Osipova is the nearest rural locality.
