= Yakina =

Yakina Якина
- Village
- Location within Perm Krai Location within Russia
- Coordinates: 58°44′N 54°49′E
- Country: Russia
- Region: Perm Krai
- District: Kudymkarsky District
- Time zone: UTC+5:00

Yakina (Russian: Якина) is a rural locality (a village) in Leninskoye Rural Settlement, Kudymkarsky District, Perm Krai, Russia. The population was 13 as of 2010.

== Geography ==
Yakina is located 43 km south of Kudymkar (the district's administrative centre) by road. Tikhonyata is the nearest rural locality.
