= Velva-Baza =

Velva-Baza Велва-База
- Settlement
- Location within Perm Krai Location within Russia
- Coordinates: 59°14′N 55°03′E
- Country: Russia
- Region: Perm Krai
- District: Kudymkarsky District
- Time zone: UTC+5:00

Velva-Baza (Russian: Велва-База) is a rural locality (a settlement) in Oshibskoye Rural Settlement, Kudymkarsky District, Perm Krai, Russia. The population was 520 as of 2010. There are 13 streets.

== Geography ==
Velva-Baza is located 44 km northeast of Kudymkar (the district's administrative centre) by road. Novoselova is the nearest rural locality.
