= Rakshina =

Rakshina Ракшина
- Village
- Location within Perm Krai Location within Russia
- Coordinates: 58°39′N 54°41′E
- Country: Russia
- Region: Perm Krai
- District: Kudymkarsky District
- Time zone: UTC+5:00

Rakshina (Russian: Ракшина) is a rural locality (a village) in Leninskoye Rural Settlement, Kudymkarsky District, Perm Krai, Russia. The population was 124 as of 2010. There are nine streets.

== Geography ==
Rakshina is located 42 km south of Kudymkar (the district's administrative centre) by road. Filayeva is the nearest rural locality.
