= Andriyanova =

Andriyanova Андриянова
- Village
- Location within Perm Krai Location within Russia
- Coordinates: 59°03′N 54°10′E
- Country: Russia
- Region: Perm Krai
- District: Kudymkarsky District
- Time zone: UTC+5:00

Andriyanova (Russian: Андриянова) is a rural locality (a village) in Verkh-Invenskoye Rural Settlement, Kudymkarsky District, Perm Krai, Russia. The population was 19 as of 2010. There is 1 street.

== Geography ==
Andriyanova is located 43 km northwest of Kudymkar (the district's administrative centre) by road. Vezhayka is the nearest rural locality.
