= Bormotova =

Bormotova Бормотова
- Village
- Location within Perm Krai Location within Russia
- Coordinates: 58°51′N 54°29′E
- Country: Russia
- Region: Perm Krai
- District: Kudymkarsky District
- Time zone: UTC+5:00

Bormotova (Russian: Бормотова) is a rural locality (a village) in Leninskoye Rural Settlement, Kudymkarsky District, Perm Krai, Russia. The population was 79 as of 2010. There are 4 streets.

== Geography ==
Bormotova is located 35 km southwest of Kudymkar (the district's administrative centre) by road. Kosogor is the nearest rural locality.
