= Mish-Piyan =

Mish-Piyan Миш-Пиян
- Village
- Location within Perm Krai Location within Russia
- Coordinates: 58°48′N 54°16′E
- Country: Russia
- Region: Perm Krai
- District: Kudymkarsky District
- Time zone: UTC+5:00

Mish-Piyan (Russian: Миш-Пиян) is a rural locality (a village) in Verkh-Invenskoye Rural Settlement, Kudymkarsky District, Perm Krai, Russia. The population was 84 as of 2010. There are 3 streets.

== Geography ==
Mish-Piyan is located 40 km southwest of Kudymkar (the district's administrative centre) by road. Demino is the nearest rural locality.
