= Systerova =

Systerova Сыстерова
- Village
- Location within Perm Krai Location within Russia
- Coordinates: 59°05′N 54°48′E
- Country: Russia
- Region: Perm Krai
- District: Kudymkarsky District
- Time zone: UTC+5:00

Systerova (Russian: Сыстерова) is a rural locality (a village) in Yorgvinskoye Rural Settlement, Kudymkarsky District, Perm Krai, Russia. The population was 16 as of 2010.

== Geography ==
Systerova is located 16 km northeast of Kudymkar (the district's administrative centre) by road. Batina is the nearest rural locality.
