= Leleva =

Leleva Лелева
- Village
- Location within Perm Krai Location within Russia
- Coordinates: 58°55′N 54°21′E
- Country: Russia
- Region: Perm Krai
- District: Kudymkarsky District
- Time zone: UTC+5:00

Leleva (Russian: Лелева) is a rural locality (a village) in Verkh-Invenskoye Rural Settlement, Kudymkarsky District, Perm Krai, Russia. The population was 62 as of 2010. There is 1 street.

== Geography ==
Leleva is located 24 km southwest of Kudymkar (the district's administrative centre) by road. Verkh-Inva is the nearest rural locality.
