= Kuzmina, Perm Krai =

Kuzmina Кузьмина
- Village
- Location within Perm Krai Location within Russia
- Coordinates: 59°12′N 54°50′E
- Country: Russia
- Region: Perm Krai
- District: Kudymkarsky District
- Time zone: UTC+5:00

Kuzmina (Russian: Кузьмина) is a rural locality (a village) in Oshibskoye Rural Settlement, Kudymkarsky District, Perm Krai, Russia. The population was 61 as of 2010.

== Geography ==
Kuzmina is located 29 km northeast of Kudymkar (the district's administrative centre) by road. Pleshkova is the nearest rural locality.
