= Konshina =

Konshina Коньшина
- Village
- Location within Perm Krai Location within Russia
- Coordinates: 59°02′N 54°35′E
- Country: Russia
- Region: Perm Krai
- District: Kudymkarsky District
- Time zone: UTC+5:00

Konshina (Russian: Коньшина) is a rural locality (a village) in Beloyevskoye Rural Settlement, Kudymkarsky District, Perm Krai, Russia. The population was 13 as of 2010.

== Geography ==
Konshina is located 8 km northwest of Kudymkar (the district's administrative centre) by road. Otevo is the nearest rural locality.
