= Kazarina =

Kazarina Казарина
- Village
- Location within Perm Krai Location within Russia
- Coordinates: 58°51′N 54°40′E
- Country: Russia
- Region: Perm Krai
- District: Kudymkarsky District
- Time zone: UTC+5:00

Kazarina (Russian: Казарина) is a rural locality (a village) in Leninskoye Rural Settlement, Kudymkarsky District, Perm Krai, Russia. The population was 55 as of 2010.

== Geography ==
Kazarina is located 20 km south of Kudymkar (the district's administrative centre) by road. Verkh-Yusva is the nearest rural locality.
