= Grishuneva =

Grishuneva Гришунева
- Village
- Location within Perm Krai Location within Russia
- Coordinates: 58°53′N 54°25′E
- Country: Russia
- Region: Perm Krai
- District: Kudymkarsky District
- Time zone: UTC+5:00

Grishuneva (Russian: Гришунева) is a rural locality (a village) in Verkh-Invenskoye Rural Settlement, Kudymkarsky District, Perm Krai, Russia. The population was 72 as of 2010. There are 3 streets.

== Geography ==
Grishuneva is located 22 km southwest of Kudymkar (the district's administrative centre) by road. Gyrova is the nearest rural locality.
