= Beloyevo =

Beloyevo Белоево
- Selo
- Location within Perm Krai Location within Russia
- Coordinates: 59°08′N 54°29′E
- Country: Russia
- Region: Perm Krai
- District: Kudymkarsky District
- Time zone: UTC+5:00

Beloyevo (Russian: Белоево) is a rural locality (a selo) and the administrative center of Beloyevskoye Rural Settlement, Kudymkarsky District, Perm Krai, Russia. The population was 18 as of 2010. There are 39 streets.

== Geography ==
Beloyevo is located 20 km northwest of Kudymkar (the district's administrative centre) by road. Ananyeva and Nepina are the nearest rural localities.
