= Staraya Kuzva =

Staraya Kuzva Старая Кузьва
- Village
- Location within Perm Krai Location within Russia
- Coordinates: 59°02′N 54°17′E
- Country: Russia
- Region: Perm Krai
- District: Kudymkarsky District
- Time zone: UTC+5:00

Staraya Kuzva (Russian: Старая Кузьва) is a rural locality (a village) in Beloyevskoye Rural Settlement, Kudymkarsky District, Perm Krai, Russia. The population was 16 as of 2010.

== Geography ==
Staraya Kuzva is located 37 km west of Kudymkar (the district's administrative centre) by road. Alexandrova is the nearest rural locality.
