= Kuzva =

Kuzva Кузьва
- Village
- Location within Perm Krai Location within Russia
- Coordinates: 59°05′N 54°22′E
- Country: Russia
- Region: Perm Krai
- District: Kudymkarsky District
- Time zone: UTC+5:00

Kuzva

Kuzva (Russian: Кузьва) is a rural locality (a village) in Beloyevskoye Rural Settlement, Kudymkarsky District, Perm Krai, Russia. The population was 268 as of 2010. There are 10 streets.

== Geography ==
Kuzva is located 29 km northwest of Kudymkar (the district's administrative centre) by road. Silina is the nearest rural locality.
