= Mechkor =

Mechkor Мечкор
- Village
- Location within Perm Krai Location within Russia
- Coordinates: 59°05′N 54°30′E
- Country: Russia
- Region: Perm Krai
- District: Kudymkarsky District
- Time zone: UTC+5:00

Mechkor (Russian: Мечкор) is a rural locality (a village) in Beloyevskoye Rural Settlement, Kudymkarsky District, Perm Krai, Russia. The population was 133 as of 2010. There are 3 streets.

== Geography ==
Mechkor is located 16 km northwest of Kudymkar (the district's administrative centre) by road. Minyadyn is the nearest rural locality.
