= Filayeva =

Filayeva Филаева
- Village
- Location within Perm Krai Location within Russia
- Coordinates: 58°38′N 54°37′E
- Country: Russia
- Region: Perm Krai
- District: Kudymkarsky District
- Time zone: UTC+5:00

Filayeva (Russian: Филаева) is a rural locality (a village) in Leninskoye Rural Settlement, Kudymkarsky District, Perm Krai, Russia. The population was 12 as of 2010.

== Geography ==
Filayeva is located 47 km south of Kudymkar (the district's administrative centre) by road. Parfenova is the nearest rural locality.
