= Mazunina =

Mazunina Мазунина
- Village
- Location within Perm Krai Location within Russia
- Coordinates: 58°43′N 54°38′E
- Country: Russia
- Region: Perm Krai
- District: Kudymkarsky District
- Time zone: UTC+5:00

Mazunina (Russian: Мазунина) is a rural locality (a village) in Leninskoye Rural Settlement, Kudymkarsky District, Perm Krai, Russia. The population was 13 as of 2010.

== Geography ==
Mazunina is located 39 km south of Kudymkar (the district's administrative centre) by road. Podgora is the nearest rural locality.
