= Moskvina, Kudymkarsky District, Perm Krai =

Moskvina Москвина
- Village
- Location within Perm Krai Location within Russia
- Coordinates: 59°00′N 54°10′E
- Country: Russia
- Region: Perm Krai
- District: Kudymkarsky District
- Time zone: UTC+5:00

Moskvina (Russian: Москвина) is a rural locality (a village) in Verkh-Invenskoye Rural Settlement, Kudymkarsky District, Perm Krai, Russia. The population was 215 as of 2010. There are 9 streets.

== Geography ==
Moskvina is located 39 km west of Kudymkar (the district's administrative centre) by road. Yarasheva is the nearest rural locality.
