= Erna, Perm Krai =

Erna Эрна
- Settlement
- Location within Perm Krai Location within Russia
- Coordinates: 59°21′N 55°22′E
- Country: Russia
- Region: Perm Krai
- District: Kudymkarsky District
- Time zone: UTC+5:00

Erna (Russian: Эрна) is a rural locality (a settlement) in Oshibskoye Rural Settlement, Kudymkarsky District, Perm Krai, Russia. The population was 192 as of 2010. There are 10 streets.

== Geography ==
Erna is located 69 km northeast of Kudymkar (the district's administrative centre) by road. Sharvol is the nearest rural locality.
