= Bolshaya Serva =

Bolshaya Serva Большая Серва
- Village
- Location within Perm Krai Location within Russia
- Coordinates: 59°02′N 54°42′E
- Country: Russia
- Region: Perm Krai
- District: Kudymkarsky District
- Time zone: UTC+5:00

Bolshaya Serva (Russian: Большая Серва) is a rural locality (a village) in Stepanovskoye Rural Settlement, Kudymkarsky District, Perm Krai, Russia. The population was 289 as of 2010. There are 13 streets.

== Geography ==
Bolshaya Serva is located 5 km northeast of Kudymkar (the district's administrative centre) by road. Zyulganova is the nearest rural locality.
