= Shaydyrova =

Shaydyrova Шайдырова
- Village
- Location within Perm Krai Location within Russia
- Coordinates: 58°51′N 54°43′E
- Country: Russia
- Region: Perm Krai
- District: Kudymkarsky District
- Time zone: UTC+5:00

Shaydyrova (Russian: Шайдырова) is a rural locality (a village) in Leninskoye Rural Settlement, Kudymkarsky District, Perm Krai, Russia. The population was 22 as of 2010.

== Geography ==
Shaydyrova is located 20 km south of Kudymkar (the district's administrative centre) by road. Spasova is the nearest rural locality.
