= Konina, Kudymkarsky District, Perm Krai =

Konina Конина
- Village
- Location within Perm Krai Location within Russia
- Coordinates: 58°49′N 54°43′E
- Country: Russia
- Region: Perm Krai
- District: Kudymkarsky District
- Time zone: UTC+5:00

Konina (Russian: Конина) is a rural locality (a village) in Leninskoye Rural Settlement, Kudymkarsky District, Perm Krai, Russia. The population was 9 as of 2010.

== Geography ==
Konina is located 25 km south of Kudymkar (the district's administrative centre) by road. Sidorshor is the nearest rural locality.
