= Yepanova =

Yepanova Епанова
- Village
- Location within Perm Krai Location within Russia
- Coordinates: 59°12′N 54°42′E
- Country: Russia
- Region: Perm Krai
- District: Kudymkarsky District
- Time zone: UTC+5:00

Yepanova (Russian: Епанова) is a rural locality (a village) in Beloyevskoye Rural Settlement, Kudymkarsky District, Perm Krai, Russia. The population was 42 as of 2010. There are 4 streets.

== Geography ==
Yepanova is located 29 km north of Kudymkar (the district's administrative centre) by road. Ilyichi is the nearest rural locality.
