= Gabova =

Gabova Габова
- Village
- Location within Perm Krai Location within Russia
- Coordinates: 59°10′N 54°36′E
- Country: Russia
- Region: Perm Krai
- District: Kudymkarsky District
- Time zone: UTC+5:00

Gabova (Russian: Габова) is a rural locality (a village) in Yorgvinskoye Rural Settlement, Kudymkarsky District, Perm Krai, Russia. The population was 22 as of 2010.

== Geography ==
Gabova is located 27 km north of Kudymkar (the district's administrative centre) by road. Gurina is the nearest rural locality.
