= Yarasheva =

Yarasheva Ярашева
- Village
- Location within Perm Krai Location within Russia
- Coordinates: 59°00′N 54°11′E
- Country: Russia
- Region: Perm Krai
- District: Kudymkarsky District
- Time zone: UTC+5:00

Yarasheva (Russian: Ярашева) is a rural locality (a village) in Verkh-Invenskoye Rural Settlement, Kudymkarsky District, Perm Krai, Russia. As of 2010, the population was 45. There is 1 street.

== Geography ==
Yarasheva is located 38 km west of Kudymkar (the district's administrative centre) by road. Moskvina is the nearest rural locality.
