= Amonova =

Amonova Амонова
- Village
- Location within Perm Krai Location within Russia
- Coordinates: 58°57′N 54°31′E
- Country: Russia
- Region: Perm Krai
- District: Kudymkarsky District
- Time zone: UTC+5:00

Amonova (Russian: Амонова) is a rural locality (a village) in Stepanovskoye Rural Settlement, Kudymkarsky District, Perm Krai, Russia. The population was 51 as of 2010.

== Geography ==
Amonova is located 12 km southwest of Kudymkar (the district's administrative centre) by road. Borisova is the nearest rural locality.
