= Pershina, Perm Krai =

Pershina Першина
- Village
- Location within Perm Krai Location within Russia
- Coordinates: 59°06′N 54°26′E
- Country: Russia
- Region: Perm Krai
- District: Kudymkarsky District
- Time zone: UTC+5:00

Pershina (Russian: Першина) is a rural locality (a village) in Beloyevskoye Rural Settlement, Kudymkarsky District, Perm Krai, Russia. The population was 38 as of 2010.

== Geography ==
Pershina is located 27 km northwest of Kudymkar (the district's administrative centre) by road. Yevsina is the nearest rural locality.
