= Valkova, Perm Krai =

Valkova Валькова
- Village
- Location within Perm Krai Location within Russia
- Coordinates: 59°02′N 54°10′E
- Country: Russia
- Region: Perm Krai
- District: Kudymkarsky District
- Time zone: UTC+5:00

Valkova (Russian: Валькова) is a rural locality (a village) in Verkh-Invenskoye Rural Settlement, Kudymkarsky District, Perm Krai, Russia. The population was 20 as of 2010. There is 1 street.

== Geography ==
Valkova is located 41 km west of Kudymkar (the district's administrative centre) by road. Andriyanova is the nearest rural locality.
