= Kirshina =

Kirshina Киршина
- Village
- Location within Perm Krai Location within Russia
- Coordinates: 59°16′N 54°40′E
- Country: Russia
- Region: Perm Krai
- District: Kudymkarsky District
- Time zone: UTC+5:00

Kirshina (Russian: Киршина) is a rural locality (a village) in Oshibskoye Rural Settlement, Kudymkarsky District, Perm Krai, Russia. The population was 95 as of 2010. There are 10 streets.

== Geography ==
Kirshina is located 37 km north of Kudymkar (the district's administrative centre) by road. Malakhova is the nearest rural locality.
