= Sordva =

Sordva Сордва
- Village
- Location within Perm Krai Location within Russia
- Coordinates: 59°06′N 54°50′E
- Country: Russia
- Region: Perm Krai
- District: Kudymkarsky District
- Time zone: UTC+5:00

Sordva (Russian: Сордва) is a rural locality (a village) in Yorgvinskoye Rural Settlement, Kudymkarsky District, Perm Krai, Russia. The population was 22 as of 2010.

== Geography ==
Sordva is located 18 km northeast of Kudymkar (the district's administrative centre) by road. Batina is the nearest rural locality.
