= Mukmarova =

Mukmarova Мурмарова
- Village
- Location within Perm Krai Location within Russia
- Coordinates: 59°07′N 54°33′E
- Country: Russia
- Region: Perm Krai
- District: Kudymkarsky District
- Time zone: UTC+5:00

Mukmarova (Russian: Мурмарова) is a rural locality (a village) in Yorgvinskoye Rural Settlement, Kudymkarsky District, Perm Krai, Russia. The population was 63 as of 2010.

== Geography ==
Mukmarova is located 16 km north of Kudymkar (the district's administrative centre) by road. Alekova is the nearest rural locality.
