= Klyuch-Mys =

Klyuch-Mys Ключ-Мыс
- Village
- Location within Perm Krai Location within Russia
- Coordinates: 58°57′N 54°11′E
- Country: Russia
- Region: Perm Krai
- District: Kudymkarsky District
- Time zone: UTC+5:00

Klyuch-Mys (Russian: Ключ-Мыс) is a rural locality (a village) in Verkh-Invenskoye Rural Settlement, Kudymkarsky District, Perm Krai, Russia. The population was 2 as of 2010. There is 1 street.

== Geography ==
Klyuch-Mys is located 35 km west of Kudymkar (the district's administrative centre) by road. Yunga is the nearest rural locality.
