= Lopvador =

Lopvador Лопвадор
- Village
- Location within Perm Krai Location within Russia
- Coordinates: 59°08′N 54°21′E
- Country: Russia
- Region: Perm Krai
- District: Kudymkarsky District
- Time zone: UTC+5:00

Lopvador (Russian: Лопвадор) is a rural locality (a village) in Beloyevskoye Rural Settlement, Kudymkarsky District, Perm Krai, Russia. The population was 11 as of 2010.

== Geography ==
Lopvador is located 29 km northwest of Kudymkar (the district's administrative centre) by road. Paleva is the nearest rural locality.
