= Vnukova, Perm Krai =

Vnukova Внукова
- Village
- Location within Perm Krai Location within Russia
- Coordinates: 58°56′N 54°28′E
- Country: Russia
- Region: Perm Krai
- District: Kudymkarsky District
- Time zone: UTC+5:00

Vnukova (Russian: Внукова) is a rural locality (a village) in Verkh-Invenskoye Rural Settlement, Kudymkarsky District, Perm Krai, Russia. The population was 69 as of 2010. There are 8 streets.

== Geography ==
Vnukova is located 16 km southwest of Kudymkar (the district's administrative centre) by road. Novozhilova is the nearest rural locality.
