= Maltseva, Perm Krai =

Maltseva Мальцева
- Village
- Location within Perm Krai Location within Russia
- Coordinates: 59°06′N 54°19′E
- Country: Russia
- Region: Perm Krai
- District: Kudymkarsky District
- Time zone: UTC+5:00

Maltseva (Russian: Мальцева) is a rural locality (a village) in Beloyevskoye Rural Settlement, Kudymkarsky District, Perm Krai, Russia. The population was 211 as of 2010. There are 8 streets.

== Geography ==
Maltseva is located 30 km northwest of Kudymkar (the district's administrative centre) by road. Kiprusheva is the nearest rural locality.
