= Podgora, Kudymkarsky District, Perm Krai =

Podgora Подгора
- Village
- Location within Perm Krai Location within Russia
- Coordinates: 58°44′N 54°38′E
- Country: Russia
- Region: Perm Krai
- District: Kudymkarsky District
- Time zone: UTC+5:00

Podgora (Russian: Подгора) is a rural locality (a village) in Leninskoye Rural Settlement, Kudymkarsky District, Perm Krai, Russia. The population was 53 as of 2010.

== Geography ==
Podgora is located 37 km south of Kudymkar (the district's administrative centre) by road. Mazunina is the nearest rural locality.
