= Muchaki =

Muchaki Мучаки
- Village
- Location within Perm Krai Location within Russia
- Coordinates: 58°50′N 54°45′E
- Country: Russia
- Region: Perm Krai
- District: Kudymkarsky District
- Time zone: UTC+5:00

Muchaki (Russian: Мучаки) is a rural locality (a village) in Leninskoye Rural Settlement, Kudymkarsky District, Perm Krai, Russia. The population was 15 as of 2010.

== Geography ==
Muchaki is located 27 km southeast of Kudymkar (the district's administrative centre) by road. Burlova is the nearest rural locality.
