= Kurdyukova =

Kurdyukova Курдюкова
- Village
- Location within Perm Krai Location within Russia
- Coordinates: 59°05′N 54°33′E
- Country: Russia
- Region: Perm Krai
- District: Kudymkarsky District
- Time zone: UTC+5:00

Kurdyukova (Russian: Курдюкова) is a rural locality (a village) in Beloyevskoye Rural Settlement, Kudymkarsky District, Perm Krai, Russia. The population was 9 as of 2010.

== Geography ==
Kurdyukova is located 13 km northwest of Kudymkar (the district's administrative centre) by road. Mosheva and Minyadyn are the nearest rural localities.
