= Vesyoly Mys =

Vesyoly Mys Весёлый Мыс
- Settlement
- Location within Perm Krai Location within Russia
- Coordinates: 58°55′N 53°56′E
- Country: Russia
- Region: Perm Krai
- District: Kudymkarsky District
- Time zone: UTC+5:00

Vesyoly Mys (Russian: Весёлый Мыс) is a rural locality (a settlement) in Verkh-Invenskoye Rural Settlement, Kudymkarsky District, Perm Krai, Russia. The population was 247 as of 2010. There are 10 streets.

== Geography ==
Vesyoly Mys is located 53 km west of Kudymkar (the district's administrative centre) by road. Yeremushkina is the nearest rural locality.
