= Ananyeva =

Ananyeva Ананьева
- Village
- Location within Perm Krai Location within Russia
- Coordinates: 59°08′N 54°27′E
- Country: Russia
- Region: Perm Krai
- District: Kudymkarsky District
- Time zone: UTC+5:00

Ananyeva (Russian: Ананьева) is a rural locality (a village) in Beloyevskoye Rural Settlement, Kudymkarsky District, Perm Krai, Russia. The population was 87 as of 2010. There is 1 street.

== Geography ==
Ananyeva is located 21 km northwest of Kudymkar (the district's administrative centre) by road. Beloyevo is the nearest rural locality.
