= Boyarskaya, Perm Krai =

Boyarskaya Боярская
- Village
- Location within Perm Krai Location within Russia
- Coordinates: 58°55′N 54°33′E
- Country: Russia
- Region: Perm Krai
- District: Kudymkarsky District
- Time zone: UTC+5:00

Boyarskaya (Russian: Боярская) is a rural locality (a village) in Stepanovskoye Rural Settlement. Kudymkarsky District, Perm Krai, Russia. The population was 9 as of 2010.

== Geography ==
Boyarskaya is located 16 km southwest of Kudymkar (the district's administrative centre) by road. Borisova is the nearest rural locality.
