= Yeremushkina =

Yeremushkina Еремушкина
- Village
- Location within Perm Krai Location within Russia
- Coordinates: 58°55′N 53°58′E
- Country: Russia
- Region: Perm Krai
- District: Kudymkarsky District
- Time zone: UTC+5:00

Yeremushkina (Russian: Еремушкина) is a rural locality (a village) in Verkh-Invenskoye Rural Settlement, Kudymkarsky District, Perm Krai, Russia. The population was 4 as of 2010. There is 1 street.

== Geography ==
Yeremushkina is located 51 km southwest of Kudymkar (the district's administrative centre) by road. Vesyoly Mys is the nearest rural locality.
