= Novoselovsky Lesouchastok =

Novoselovsky Lesouchastok Новоселовский Лесоучасток
- Settlement
- Location within Perm Krai Location within Russia
- Coordinates: 58°54′N 54°41′E
- Country: Russia
- Region: Perm Krai
- District: Kudymkarsky District
- Time zone: UTC+5:00

Novoselovsky Lesouchastok (Russian: Новоселовский Лесоучасток) is a rural locality (a settlement) in Stepanovskoye Rural Settlement, Kudymkarsky District, Perm Krai, Russia. The population was 42 as of 2010. There are 2 streets.

== Geography ==
Novoselovsky Lesouchastok is located 14 km south of Kudymkar (the district's administrative centre) by road. Kekur is the nearest rural locality.
