= Proneva =

Proneva Пронева
- Village
- Location within Perm Krai Location within Russia
- Coordinates: 59°04′N 54°54′E
- Country: Russia
- Region: Perm Krai
- District: Kudymkarsky District
- Time zone: UTC+5:00

Proneva (Russian: Пронева) is a rural locality (a village) in Yorgvinskoye Rural Settlement, Kudymkarsky District, Perm Krai, Russia. The population was 35 as of 2010.

== Geography ==
Proneva is located 14 km northeast of Kudymkar (the district's administrative centre) by road. Samchikova is the nearest rural locality.
