= Karp-Vaskina =

Karp-Vaskina Карп-Васькина
- Village
- Location within Perm Krai Location within Russia
- Coordinates: 59°05′N 54°15′E
- Country: Russia
- Region: Perm Krai
- District: Kudymkarsky District
- Time zone: UTC+5:00
- Postal code(s): 619558

Karp-Vaskina (Russian: Карп-Васькина) is a rural locality (a village) in Beloyevskoye Rural Settlement, Kudymkarsky District, Perm Krai, Russia. The population was 8 as of 2010.

== Geography ==
Karp-Vaskina is located 42 km northwest of Kudymkar (the district's administrative centre) by road. Malakhova is the nearest rural locality.
