= Batina, Perm Krai =

Batina Батина
- Village
- Location within Perm Krai Location within Russia
- Coordinates: 59°05′N 54°50′E
- Country: Russia
- Region: Perm Krai
- District: Kudymkarsky District
- Time zone: UTC+5:00

Batina (Russian: Батина) is a rural locality (a village) in Yorgvinskoye Rural Settlement, Kudymkarsky District, Perm Krai, Russia. The population was 102 as of 2010. There are 3 streets.

== Geography ==
Batina is located 17 km northeast of Kudymkar (the district's administrative centre) by road. Systerova is the nearest rural locality.
