= Vaskina Gar =

Vaskina Gar Васькина Гарь
- Village
- Location within Perm Krai Location within Russia
- Coordinates: 58°46′N 54°39′E
- Country: Russia
- Region: Perm Krai
- District: Kudymkarsky District
- Time zone: UTC+5:00

Vaskina Gar (Russian: Васькина Гарь) is a rural locality (a village) in Leninskoye Rural Settlement, Kudymkarsky District, Perm Krai, Russia. The population was 6 as of 2010.

== Geography ==
Vaskina Gar is located 31 km south of Kudymkar (the district's administrative centre) by road. Pronina is the nearest rural locality.
