= Nepina =

Nepina Непина
- Village
- Location within Perm Krai Location within Russia
- Coordinates: 59°09′N 54°29′E
- Country: Russia
- Region: Perm Krai
- District: Kudymkarsky District
- Time zone: UTC+5:00

Nepina (Russian: Непина) is a rural locality (a village) in Beloyevskoye Rural Settlement, Kudymkarsky District, Perm Krai, Russia. The population was 124 as of 2010. There are 2 streets.

== Geography ==
Nepina is located 22 km northwest of Kudymkar (the district's administrative centre) by road. Beloyevo is the nearest rural locality.
