= Koshtanova =

Koshtanova Коштанова
- Village
- Location within Perm Krai Location within Russia
- Coordinates: 58°51′N 54°17′E
- Country: Russia
- Region: Perm Krai
- District: Kudymkarsky District
- Time zone: UTC+5:00

Koshtanova (Russian: Коштанова) is a rural locality (a village) in Verkh-Invenskoye Rural Settlement, Kudymkarsky District, Perm Krai, Russia. The population was 42 as of 2010. There is 1 street.

== Geography ==
Koshtanova is located 33 km southwest of Kudymkar (the district's administrative centre) by road. Antonova is the nearest rural locality.
