= Kuzolova =

Kuzolova Кузолова
- Village
- Location within Perm Krai Location within Russia
- Coordinates: 58°54′N 54°18′E
- Country: Russia
- Region: Perm Krai
- District: Kudymkarsky District
- Time zone: UTC+5:00

Kuzolova (Russian: Кузолова) is a rural locality (a village) in Verkh-Invenskoye Rural Settlement, Kudymkarsky District, Perm Krai, Russia.

== Population ==
The population was 1 as of 2010. There is 1 street.

== Geography ==
Kuzolova is located 27 km southwest of Kudymkar (the district's administrative centre) by road. Verkh-Inva and Kovylyayeva are the nearest rural localities.
