= Gordina, Perm Krai =

Gordina Гордина
- Village
- Location within Perm Krai Location within Russia
- Coordinates: 59°07′N 54°24′E
- Country: Russia
- Region: Perm Krai
- District: Kudymkarsky District
- Time zone: UTC+5:00

Gordina (Russian: Гордина) is a rural locality (a village) in Beloyevskoye Rural Settlement, Kudymkarsky District, Perm Krai, Russia. The population was 2 as of 2010.

== Geography ==
Gordina is located 24 km northwest of Kudymkar (the district's administrative centre) by road. Shadrina is the nearest rural locality.
