= Vazh-Chigas =

Vazh-Chigas Важ-Чигас
- Village
- Location within Perm Krai Location within Russia
- Coordinates: 59°09′N 54°30′E
- Country: Russia
- Region: Perm Krai
- District: Kudymkarsky District
- Time zone: UTC+5:00

Vazh-Chigas (Russian: Важ-Чигас) is a rural locality (a village) in Beloyevskoye Rural Settlement, Kudymkarsky District, Perm Krai, Russia. The population was 29 as of 2010.

== Geography ==
Vazh-Chigas is located 22 km northwest of Kudymkar (the district's administrative centre) by road. Nepina is the nearest rural locality.
