= Balkachi =

Balkachi Балкачи
- Village
- Location within Perm Krai Location within Russia
- Coordinates: 58°42′N 54°42′E
- Country: Russia
- Region: Perm Krai
- District: Kudymkarsky District
- Time zone: UTC+5:00

Balkachi (Russian: Балкачи) is a rural locality (a village) in Leninskoye Rural Settlement, Kudymkarsky District, Perm Krai, Russia. The population was 38 as of 2010.

== Geography ==
Balkachi is located 39 km south of Kudymkar (the district's administrative centre) by road. Yevdokimova is the nearest rural locality.
