= Ivankova =

Ivankova Иванкова
- Village
- Location within Perm Krai Location within Russia
- Coordinates: 58°44′N 54°47′E
- Country: Russia
- Region: Perm Krai
- District: Kudymkarsky District
- Time zone: UTC+5:00

Ivankova (Russian: Иванкова) is a rural locality (a village) in Leninskoye Rural Settlement, Kudymkarsky District, Perm Krai, Russia. The population was 36 as of 2010.

== Geography ==
Ivankova is located 42 km south of Kudymkar (the district's administrative centre) by road. Pyatina is the nearest rural locality.
