= Tsybyan =

Tsybyan Цыбьян
- Village
- Location within Perm Krai Location within Russia
- Coordinates: 59°14′N 54°31′E
- Country: Russia
- Region: Perm Krai
- District: Kudymkarsky District
- Time zone: UTC+5:00

Tsybyan (Russian: Цыбьян) is a rural locality (a village) in Beloyevskoye Rural Settlement, Kudymkarsky District, Perm Krai, Russia. The population was 8 as of 2010.

== Geography ==
Tsybyan is located 34 km north of Kudymkar (the district's administrative centre) by road. Vyatchina is the nearest rural locality.
