= Dodonova =

Dodonova Додонова
- Village
- Location within Perm Krai Location within Russia
- Coordinates: 59°07′N 54°43′E
- Country: Russia
- Region: Perm Krai
- District: Kudymkarsky District
- Time zone: UTC+5:00

Dodonova (Russian: Додонова) is a rural locality (a village) in Yorgvinskoye Rural Settlement, Kudymkarsky District, Perm Krai, Russia. The population was 12 as of 2010.

== Geography ==
Dodonova is located 17 km north of Kudymkar (the district's administrative centre) by road. Rektanova is the nearest rural locality.
