= Koroleva, Kudymkarsky District, Perm Krai =

Koroleva Королева
- Village
- Location within Perm Krai Location within Russia
- Coordinates: 59°08′N 54°34′E
- Country: Russia
- Region: Perm Krai
- District: Kudymkarsky District
- Time zone: UTC+5:00

Koroleva (Russian: Королева) is a rural locality (a village) in Beloyevskoye Rural Settlement, Kudymkarsky District, Perm Krai, Russia. The population was 1 as of 2010.

== Geography ==
Koroleva is located 26 km north of Kudymkar (the district's administrative centre) by road. Vasyukova is the nearest rural locality.
