= Samkovo =

Samkovo Самково
- Selo
- Location within Perm Krai Location within Russia
- Coordinates: 58°56′N 54°04′E
- Country: Russia
- Region: Perm Krai
- District: Kudymkarsky District
- Time zone: UTC+5:00

Samkovo (Russian: Самково) is a rural locality (a selo) in Verkh-Invenskoye Rural Settlement, Kudymkarsky District, Perm Krai, Russia. The population was 378 as of 2010. There are 12 streets.

== Geography ==
Samkovo is located 42 km southwest of Kudymkar (the district's administrative centre) by road. Berezovka is the nearest rural locality.
