= Peshnigort =

Peshnigort Пешнигорт
- Selo
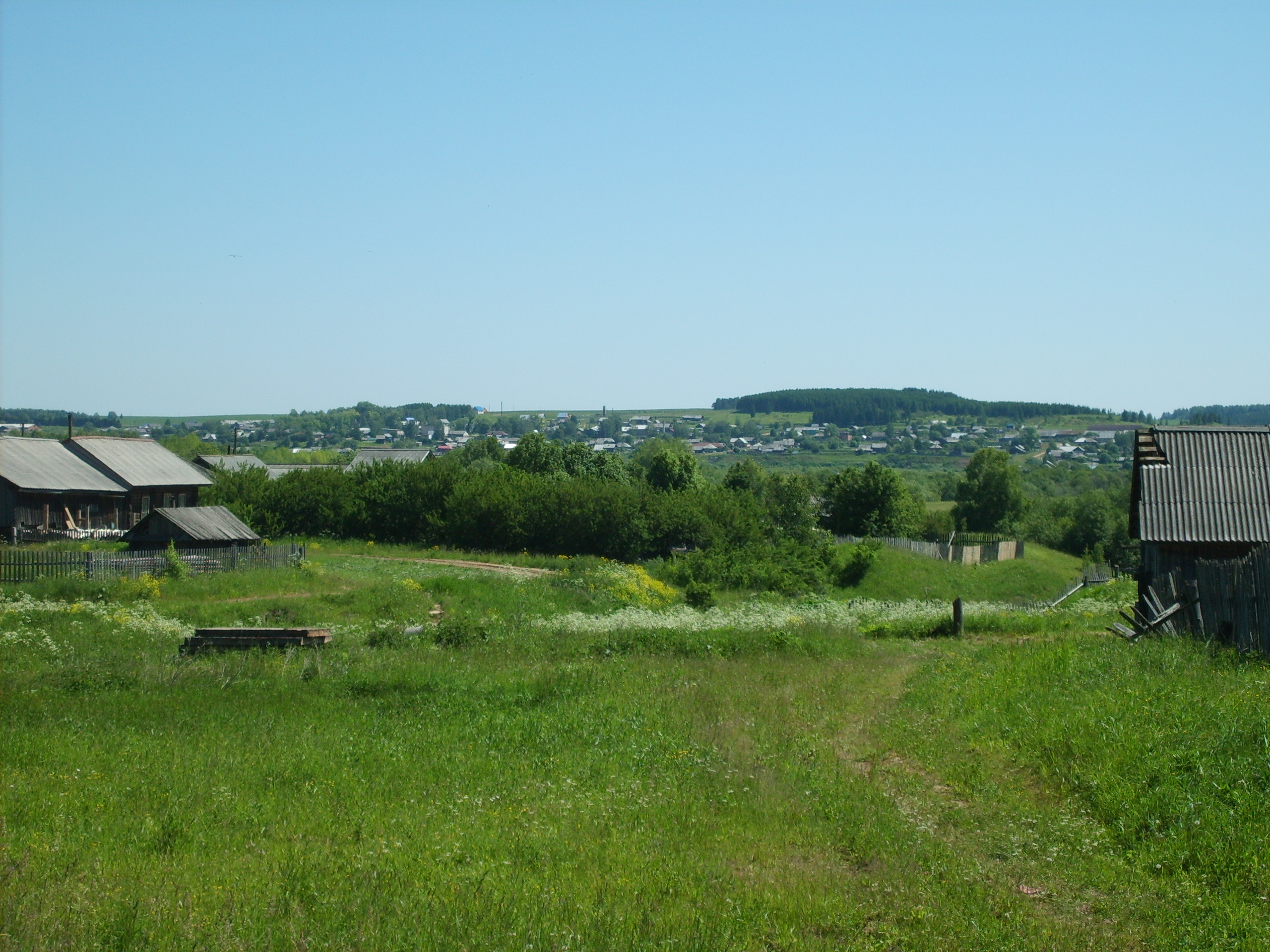

- Location within Perm Krai Location within Russia
- Coordinates: 58°57′N 54°34′E
- Country: Russia
- Region: Perm Krai
- District: Kudymkarsky District
- Time zone: UTC+5:00

Peshnigort (Russian: Пешнигорт) is a rural locality (a selo) in Stepanovskoye Rural Settlement, Kudymkarsky District, Perm Krai, Russia. The population was 856 as of 2010. There are 25 streets.

== Geography ==
Peshnigort is located 9 km southwest of Kudymkar (the district's administrative centre) by road. Zarechny Peshnigort is the nearest rural locality.
