= Tarova =

Tarova Тарова
- Village
- Location within Perm Krai Location within Russia
- Coordinates: 58°58′N 54°43′E
- Country: Russia
- Region: Perm Krai
- District: Kudymkarsky District
- Time zone: UTC+5:00

Tarova (Russian: Тарова) is a rural locality (a village) in Stepanovskoye Rural Settlement, Kudymkarsky District, Perm Krai, Russia. The population was 497 as of 2010. There are 7 streets.

== Geography ==
Tarova is located 6 km southeast of Kudymkar (the district's administrative centre) by road. Artamonova is the nearest rural locality.
