= Karpina, Perm Krai =

Karpina Карпина
- Village
- Location within Perm Krai Location within Russia
- Coordinates: 58°41′N 54°26′E
- Country: Russia
- Region: Perm Krai
- District: Kudymkarsky District
- Time zone: UTC+5:00

Karpina (Russian: Карпина) is a rural locality (a village) in Leninskoye Rural Settlement, Kudymkarsky District, Perm Krai, Russia. The population was 39 as of 2010.

== Geography ==
Karpina is located 60 km southwest of Kudymkar (the district's administrative centre) by road. Polva is the nearest rural locality.
