= Sidorshor =

Sidorshor Сидоршор
- Village
- Location within Perm Krai Location within Russia
- Coordinates: 58°49′N 54°41′E
- Country: Russia
- Region: Perm Krai
- District: Kudymkarsky District
- Time zone: UTC+5:00

Sidorshor (Russian: Сидоршор) is a rural locality (a village) in Leninskoye Rural Settlement, Kudymkarsky District, Perm Krai, Russia. The population was 182 as of 2010. There are 6 streets.

== Geography ==
Sidorshor is located 23 km south of Kudymkar (the district's administrative centre) by road. Verkh-Yusva is the nearest rural locality.
