= Rocheva, Perm Krai =

Rocheva Рочева
- Village
- Location within Perm Krai Location within Russia
- Coordinates: 59°13′N 54°53′E
- Country: Russia
- Region: Perm Krai
- District: Kudymkarsky District
- Time zone: UTC+5:00

Rocheva (Russian: Рочева) is a rural locality (a village) in Oshibskoye Rural Settlement, Kudymkarsky District, Perm Krai, Russia. The population was 101 in 2010. There are three streets.

== Geography ==
Rocheva is located 32 km northeast of Kudymkar (the district's administrative centre) by road. Oshib is the nearest rural locality.
