= Klyuchi, Kudymkarsky District, Perm Krai =

Klyuchi Ключи
- Village
- Location within Perm Krai Location within Russia
- Coordinates: 58°38′N 54°31′E
- Country: Russia
- Region: Perm Krai
- District: Kudymkarsky District
- Time zone: UTC+5:00

Klyuchi (Russian: Ключи) is a rural locality (a village) in Leninskoye Rural Settlement, Kudymkarsky District, Perm Krai, Russia. The population was 33 as of 2010.

== Geography ==
Klyuchi is located 53 km south of Kudymkar (the district's administrative centre) by road. Parfenova is the nearest rural locality.
