= Kosva, Perm Krai =

Kosva Косьва
- Village
- Location within Perm Krai Location within Russia
- Coordinates: 59°12′N 54°54′E
- Country: Russia
- Region: Perm Krai
- District: Kudymkarsky District
- Time zone: UTC+5:00

Kosva (Russian: Косьва) is a rural locality (a village) in Oshibskoye Rural Settlement, Kudymkarsky District, Perm Krai, Russia. The population was 17 as of 2010.

== Geography ==
Kosva is located 34 km northeast of Kudymkar (the district's administrative centre) by road. Oshib is the nearest rural locality.
