= Mironova, Kudymkarsky District, Perm Krai =

Mironova Миронова
- Village
- Location within Perm Krai Location within Russia
- Coordinates: 58°57′N 54°39′E
- Country: Russia
- Region: Perm Krai
- District: Kudymkarsky District
- Time zone: UTC+5:00

Mironova (Russian: Миронова) is a rural locality (a village) in Stepanovskoye Rural Settlement, Kudymkarsky District, Perm Krai, Russia. The population was 43 as of 2010. There are 3 streets.

== Geography ==
Mironova is located 8 km south of Kudymkar (the district's administrative centre) by road. Pochkina is the nearest rural locality.
