= Maximova, Perm Krai =

Maximova Максимова
- Village
- Location within Perm Krai Location within Russia
- Coordinates: 59°15′N 54°47′E
- Country: Russia
- Region: Perm Krai
- District: Kudymkarsky District
- Time zone: UTC+5:00

Maximova (Russian: Максимова) is a rural locality (a village) in Oshibskoye Rural Settlement, Kudymkarsky District, Perm Krai, Russia. The population was 8 as of 2010.

== Geography ==
Maximova is located 36 km north of Kudymkar (the district's administrative centre) by road. Vil-Konanova is the nearest rural locality.
