= Kovylyaeva =

Kovylyaeva Ковыляева
- Village
- Location within Perm Krai Location within Russia
- Coordinates: 58°54′N 54°18′E
- Country: Russia
- Region: Perm Krai
- District: Kudymkarsky District
- Time zone: UTC+5:00

Kovylyaeva (Russian: Ковыляева) is a rural locality (a village) in Verkh-Invenskoye Rural Settlement, Kudymkarsky District, Perm Krai, Russia. The population was 65 as of 2010. There is 1 street.

== Geography ==
Kovylyaeva is located 26 km southwest of Kudymkar (the district's administrative centre) by road. Kukshinova is the nearest rural locality.
