= Novaya Shlyapina =

Novaya Shlyapina Новая Шляпина
- Village
- Location within Perm Krai Location within Russia
- Coordinates: 59°15′N 55°03′E
- Country: Russia
- Region: Perm Krai
- District: Kudymkarsky District
- Time zone: UTC+5:00

Novaya Shlyapina (Russian: Новая Шляпина) is a rural locality (a village) in Oshibskoye Rural Settlement, Kudymkarsky District, Perm Krai, Russia. The population was 46 as of 2010.

== Geography ==
Novaya Shlyapina is located 43 km northeast of Kudymkar (the district's administrative centre) by road. Staraya Shlyapina is the nearest rural locality.
