= Miteva, Perm Krai =

Miteva Митева
- Village
- Location within Perm Krai Location within Russia
- Coordinates: 59°06′N 54°23′E
- Country: Russia
- Region: Perm Krai
- District: Kudymkarsky District
- Time zone: UTC+5:00

Miteva (Russian: Митева) is a rural locality (a village) in Beloyevskoye Rural Settlement, Kudymkarsky District, Perm Krai, Russia. The population was 4 as of 2010.

== Geography ==
Miteva is located 27 km northwest of Kudymkar (the district's administrative centre) by road. Yevsina is the nearest rural locality.
