= Tretyeva =

Tretyeva Третьева
- Village
- Location within Perm Krai Location within Russia
- Coordinates: 59°11′N 54°21′E
- Country: Russia
- Region: Perm Krai
- District: Kudymkarsky District
- Time zone: UTC+5:00

Tretyeva (Russian: Третьева) is a rural locality (a village) in Beloyevskoye Rural Settlement, Kudymkarsky District, Perm Krai, Russia. The population was 10 as of 2010.

== Geography ==
Tretyeva is located 31 km northwest of Kudymkar (the district's administrative centre) by road. Perkova is the nearest rural locality.
