= Alexandrova, Perm Krai =

Alexandrova Александрова
- Village
- Location within Perm Krai Location within Russia
- Coordinates: 59°02′N 54°20′E
- Country: Russia
- Region: Perm Krai
- District: Kudymkarsky District
- Time zone: UTC+5:00

Alexandrova (Russian: Александрова) is a rural locality (a village) in Beloyevskoye Rural Settlement, Kudymkarsky District, Perm Krai, Russia. The population was 7 as of 2010.

== Geography ==
Alexandrova is located 37 km northwest of Kudymkar (the district's administrative centre) by road. Sergeyeva is the nearest rural locality.
