= Golubkova =

Golubkova Голубкова
- Village
- Location within Perm Krai Location within Russia
- Coordinates: 58°54′N 54°29′E
- Country: Russia
- Region: Perm Krai
- District: Kudymkarsky District
- Time zone: UTC+5:00

Golubkova (Russian: Голубкова) is a rural locality (a village) in Verkh-Invenskoye Rural Settlement, Kudymkarsky District, Perm Krai, Russia. The population was 2 as of 2010. There is 1 street.

== Geography ==
Golubkova is located 18 km southwest of Kudymkar (the district's administrative centre) by road. Novozhilova is the nearest rural locality.
