= Pochkina =

Pochkina Почкина
- Village
- Location within Perm Krai Location within Russia
- Coordinates: 58°57′N 54°38′E
- Country: Russia
- Region: Perm Krai
- District: Kudymkarsky District
- Time zone: UTC+5:00

Pochkina (Russian: Почкина) is a rural locality (a village) in Stepanovskoye Rural Settlement, Kudymkarsky District, Perm Krai, Russia. The population was 90 as of 2010. There are 8 streets.

== Geography ==
Pochkina is located 7 km south of Kudymkar (the district's administrative centre) by road. Mironova is the nearest rural locality.
