= Trapezniki =

Trapezniki Трапезники
- Village
- Location within Perm Krai Location within Russia
- Coordinates: 59°14′N 54°46′E
- Country: Russia
- Region: Perm Krai
- District: Kudymkarsky District
- Time zone: UTC+5:00

Trapezniki (Russian: Трапезники) is a rural locality (a village) in Oshibskoye Rural Settlement, Kudymkarsky District, Perm Krai, Russia. The population was 34 as of 2010.

== Weather ==
Between 5°c to 9°c in day time and 10°c to 18°c in night time.

== Geography ==
Trapezniki is located 30 km north of Kudymkar (the district's administrative centre) by road. Fadeyeva is the nearest rural locality.
