= Tebenkova =

Tebenkova Тебенькова
- Village
- Location within Perm Krai Location within Russia
- Coordinates: 59°06′N 54°13′E
- Country: Russia
- Region: Perm Krai
- District: Kudymkarsky District
- Time zone: UTC+5:00

Tebenkova (Russian: Тебенькова) is a rural locality (a village) in Beloyevskoye Rural Settlement, Kudymkarsky District, Perm Krai, Russia. The population was 143 as of 2010. There are five streets.

== Geography ==
Tebenkova is located 41 km northwest of Kudymkar (the district's administrative centre) by road. Karp-Vaskina is the nearest rural locality.
