= Vil-Konanova =

Vil-Konanova Виль-Конанова
- Village
- Location within Perm Krai Location within Russia
- Coordinates: 59°15′N 54°46′E
- Country: Russia
- Region: Perm Krai
- District: Kudymkarsky District
- Time zone: UTC+5:00

Vil-Konanova (Russian: Виль-Конанова) is a rural locality (a village) in Oshibskoye Rural Settlement, Kudymkarsky District, Perm Krai, Russia. The population was 14 as of 2010.

== Geography ==
Vil-Konanova is located 35 km north of Kudymkar (the district's administrative centre) by road. Maximova is the nearest rural locality.
