= Galyukova =

Galyukova Галюкова
- Village
- Location within Perm Krai Location within Russia
- Coordinates: 59°16′N 55°07′E
- Country: Russia
- Region: Perm Krai
- District: Kudymkarsky District
- Time zone: UTC+5:00

Galyukova (Russian: Галюкова) is a rural locality (a village) in Oshibskoye Rural Settlement, Kudymkarsky District, Perm Krai, Russia. The population was 23 as of 2010.

== Geography ==
Galyukova is located 48 km northeast of Kudymkar (the district's administrative centre) by road. Melekhina is the nearest rural locality.
