= Rektanova =

Rektanova Ректанова
- Village
- Location within Perm Krai Location within Russia
- Coordinates: 59°08′N 54°43′E
- Country: Russia
- Region: Perm Krai
- District: Kudymkarsky District
- Time zone: UTC+5:00

Rektanova (Russian: Ректанова) is a rural locality (a village) in Yorgvinskoye Rural Settlement, Kudymkarsky District, Perm Krai, Russia. The population was 1 as of 2010.

== Geography ==
Rektanova is located 18 km north of Kudymkar (the district's administrative centre) by road. Dodonova is the nearest rural locality.
