= Shadrina, Perm Krai =

Shadrina Шадрина
- Village
- Location within Perm Krai Location within Russia
- Coordinates: 59°08′N 54°23′E
- Country: Russia
- Region: Perm Krai
- District: Kudymkarsky District
- Time zone: UTC+5:00

Shadrina (Russian: Шадрина) is a rural locality (a village) in Beloyevskoye Rural Settlement, Kudymkarsky District, Perm Krai, Russia. The population was 187 as of 2010. There are 4 streets.

== Geography ==
Shadrina is located 3 km south of Kudymkar (the district's administrative centre) by road.
