= Isakova =

Isakova Исакова
- Village
- Location within Perm Krai Location within Russia
- Coordinates: 59°08′N 54°24′E
- Country: Russia
- Region: Perm Krai
- District: Kudymkarsky District
- Time zone: UTC+5:00

Isakova (Russian: Исакова) is a rural locality (a village) in Beloyevskoye Rural Settlement, Kudymkarsky District, Perm Krai, Russia. The population was 9 as of 2010.

== Geography ==
Isakova is located 29 km northwest of Kudymkar (the district's administrative centre) by road. Gordina is the nearest rural locality.
