= Cheremnova =

Cheremnova Черемнова
- Village
- Location within Perm Krai Location within Russia
- Coordinates: 58°59′N 54°12′E
- Country: Russia
- Region: Perm Krai
- District: Kudymkarsky District
- Time zone: UTC+5:00

Cheremnova (Russian: Черемнова) is a rural locality (a village) in Verkh-Invenskoye Rural Settlement, Kudymkarsky District, Perm Krai, Russia. The population was 35 as of 2010. There is 1 street.

== Geography ==
Cheremnova is located 36 km west of Kudymkar (the district's administrative centre) by road. Yarasheva is the nearest rural locality.
