= Vil-Chukyleva =

Vil-Chukyleva Виль-Чукылева
- Village
- Location within Perm Krai Location within Russia
- Coordinates: 59°12′N 54°43′E
- Country: Russia
- Region: Perm Krai
- District: Kudymkarsky District
- Time zone: UTC+5:00

Vil-Chukyleva (Russian: Виль-Чукылева) is a rural locality (a village) in Oshibskoye Rural Settlement, Kudymkarsky District, Perm Krai, Russia. The population was 11 as of 2010.

== Geography ==
Vil-Chukyleva is located 28 km north of Kudymkar (the district's administrative centre) by road. Konanova is the nearest rural locality.
