= Podvolochnaya =

Podvolochnaya Подволочная
- Village
- Location within Perm Krai Location within Russia
- Coordinates: 58°45′N 54°08′E
- Country: Russia
- Region: Perm Krai
- District: Kudymkarsky District
- Time zone: UTC+5:00

Podvolochnaya (Russian: Подволочная) is a rural locality (a village) in Verkh-Invenskoye Rural Settlement, Kudymkarsky District, Perm Krai, Russia. The population was 1 as of 2010. There is 1 street.

== Geography ==
Podvolochnaya is located 3 km south of Kudymkar (the district's administrative centre) by road.
