= Zhivyye =

Zhivyye Живые
- Village
- Location within Perm Krai Location within Russia
- Coordinates: 58°46′N 54°46′E
- Country: Russia
- Region: Perm Krai
- District: Kudymkarsky District
- Time zone: UTC+5:00

Zhivyye (Russian: Живые) is a rural locality in Leninskoye Rural Settlement, Kudymkarsky District, Perm Krai, Russia. The population was 45 as of 2010.

== Geography ==
Zhivyye is located 39 km south of Kudymkar (the district's administrative centre) by road. Buslayeva is the nearest rural locality.
