= Danshina =

Danshina Даньшина
- Village
- Location within Perm Krai Location within Russia
- Coordinates: 59°10′N 54°47′E
- Country: Russia
- Region: Perm Krai
- District: Kudymkarsky District
- Time zone: UTC+5:00

Danshina (Russian: Даньшина) is a rural locality (a village) in Yorgvinskoye Rural Settlement, Kudymkarsky District, Perm Krai, Russia. The population was 11 as of 2010.

== Geography ==
Danshina is located 20 km north of Kudymkar (the district's administrative centre) by road. Osipova is the nearest rural locality.
