= Ponosova =

Ponosova Поносова
- Village
- Location within Perm Krai Location within Russia
- Coordinates: 59°04′N 54°54′E
- Country: Russia
- Region: Perm Krai
- District: Kudymkarsky District
- Time zone: UTC+5:00

Ponosova (Russian: Поносова) is a rural locality (a village) in Yorgvinskoye Rural Settlement, Kudymkarsky District, Perm Krai, Russia. The population was 112 as of 2010. There are 8 streets.

== Geography ==
Ponosova is located 25 km northeast of Kudymkar (the district's administrative centre) by road. Sludina is the nearest rural locality.
