= Martyusheva =

Martyusheva Мартюшева
- Village
- Location within Perm Krai Location within Russia
- Coordinates: 58°57′N 54°14′E
- Country: Russia
- Region: Perm Krai
- District: Kudymkarsky District
- Time zone: UTC+5:00

Martyusheva (Russian: Мартюшева) is a rural locality (a village) in Verkh-Invenskoye Rural Settlement, Kudymkarsky District, Perm Krai, Russia. The population was nine, as of 2010. There is one street.

== Geography ==
Martyusheva is located 34 km west of Kudymkar (the district's administrative centre) by road. Kharinova is the nearest rural locality.
