= Melekhina =

Melekhina Мелехина
- Village
- Location within Perm Krai Location within Russia
- Coordinates: 59°06′N 54°19′E
- Country: Russia
- Region: Perm Krai
- District: Kudymkarsky District
- Time zone: UTC+5:00

Melekhina (Russian: Мелехина) is a rural locality (a village) in Oshibskoye Rural Settlement, Kudymkarsky District, Perm Krai, Russia. The population was 159 as of 2010. There are 10 streets.

== Geography ==
Melekhina is located 46 km northeast of Kudymkar (the district's administrative centre) by road. Staraya Shlyapina is the nearest rural locality.
