= Shaburova =

Shaburova Шабурова
- Village
- Location within Perm Krai Location within Russia
- Coordinates: 59°03′N 54°51′E
- Country: Russia
- Region: Perm Krai
- District: Kudymkarsky District
- Time zone: UTC+5:00

Shaburova (Russian: Шабурова) is a rural locality (a village) in Yorgvinskoye Rural Settlement, Kudymkarsky District, Perm Krai, Russia. The population was 7 as of 2010.

== Geography ==
Shaburova is located 19 km northeast of Kudymkar (the district's administrative centre) by road. Derskanova is the nearest rural locality.
