= Vazh-Palnik =

Vazh-Palnik Важ-Пальник
- Village
- Location within Perm Krai Location within Russia
- Coordinates: 59°14′N 54°53′E
- Country: Russia
- Region: Perm Krai
- District: Kudymkarsky District
- Time zone: UTC+5:00

Vazh-Palnik (Russian: Важ-Пальник) is a rural locality (a village) in Oshibskoye Rural Settlement, Kudymkarsky District, Perm Krai, Russia. The population was 8 as of 2010.

== Geography ==
Vazh-Palnik is located 33 km northeast of Kudymkar (the district's administrative centre) by road. Rocheva is the nearest rural locality.
