= Pleshkova, Perm Krai =

Village in Perm Krai, Russia

Pleshkova Плешкова
- Village
- Location within Perm Krai Location within Russia
- Coordinates: 59°13′N 54°49′E
- Country: Russia
- Region: Perm Krai
- District: Kudymkarsky District
- Time zone: UTC+5:00

Pleshkova (Russian: Плешкова) is a rural locality (a village) in Oshibskoye Rural Settlement, Kudymkarsky District, Perm Krai, Russia. The population was 44 as of 2010. There are 3 streets.

== Geography ==
Pleshkova is located 28 km northeast of Kudymkar (the district's administrative centre) by road. Kuzmina is the nearest rural locality.
