= Bolka =

Bolka Болка
- Village
- Location within Perm Krai Location within Russia
- Coordinates: 58°39′N 54°29′E
- Country: Russia
- Region: Perm Krai
- District: Kudymkarsky District
- Time zone: UTC+5:00

Bolka (Russian: Болка) is a rural locality (a village) in Leninskoye Rural Settlement, Kudymkarsky District, Perm Krai, Russia. The population was 22 as of 2010.

== Geography ==
Bolka is located 54 km south of Kudymkar (the district's administrative centre) by road. Klyuchi is the nearest rural locality.
