= Arkhipova, Perm Krai =

Arkhipova Архипова
- Village
- Location within Perm Krai Location within Russia
- Coordinates: 59°16′N 54°45′E
- Country: Russia
- Region: Perm Krai
- District: Kudymkarsky District
- Time zone: UTC+5:00

Arkhipova (Russian: Архипова) is a rural locality (a village) in Oshibskoye Rural Settlement, Kudymkarsky District, Perm Krai, Russia. The population was 54 as of 2010.

== Geography ==
Arkhipova is located 34 km (21 mi) north of Kudymkar (the district's administrative centre) by road. Devina is the nearest rural locality.
