= Vil-Zhukova =

Vil-Zhukova Виль-Жукова
- Village
- Location within Perm Krai Location within Russia
- Coordinates: 58°58′N 54°14′E
- Country: Russia
- Region: Perm Krai
- District: Kudymkarsky District
- Time zone: UTC+5:00

Vil-Zhukova (Russian: Виль-Жукова) is a rural locality (a village) in Verkh-Invenskoye Rural Settlement, Kudymkarsky District, Perm Krai, Russia. The population was 27 as of 2010. There is one street.

== Geography ==
Vil-Zhukova is located 33 km west of Kudymkar (the district's administrative centre) by road. Kharinova is the nearest rural locality.
