= Gyrova =

Gyrova Гырова
- Village
- Location within Perm Krai Location within Russia
- Coordinates: 58°53′N 54°26′E
- Country: Russia
- Region: Perm Krai
- District: Kudymkarsky District
- Time zone: UTC+5:00

Gyrova (Russian: Гырова) is a rural locality (a village) in Verkh-Invenskoye Rural Settlement, Kudymkarsky District, Perm Krai, Russia. The population was 20 as of 2010. There is 1 street.

== Geography ==
Gyrova is located 22 km southwest of Kudymkar (the district's administrative centre) by road. Grishuneva is the nearest rural locality.
