= Ostapova =

Ostapova Остапова
- Village
- Location within Perm Krai Location within Russia
- Coordinates: 58°58′N 54°45′E
- Country: Russia
- Region: Perm Krai
- District: Kudymkarsky District
- Time zone: UTC+5:00

Ostapova (Russian: Остапова) is a rural locality (a village) in Stepanovskoye Rural Settlement, Kudymkarsky District, Perm Krai, Russia. The population was 41 as of 2010. There are 2 streets.

== Geography ==
Ostapova is located 9 km southeast of Kudymkar (the district's administrative centre) by road. Tarova is the nearest rural locality.
