= Razina =

Razina Разина
- Village
- Location within Perm Krai Location within Russia
- Coordinates: 58°53′N 54°28′E
- Country: Russia
- Region: Perm Krai
- District: Kudymkarsky District
- Time zone: UTC+5:00

Razina (Russian: Разина) is a rural locality (a village) in Verkh-Invenskoye Rural Settlement, Kudymkarsky District, Perm Krai, Russia. The population was 116 as of 2010. There are 8 streets.

== Geography ==
Razina is located 20 km southwest of Kudymkar (the district's administrative centre) by road. Sidorova is the nearest rural locality.
