= Ilyichi =

Ilyichi Ильичи
- Village
- Location within Perm Krai Location within Russia
- Coordinates: 59°12′N 54°30′E
- Country: Russia
- Region: Perm Krai
- District: Kudymkarsky District
- Time zone: UTC+5:00

Ilyichi (Russian: Ильичи) is a rural locality (a village) in Beloyevskoye Rural Settlement, Kudymkarsky District, Perm Krai, Russia. The population was 21 as of 2010. There is 1 street.

== Geography ==
Ilyichi is located 28 km north of Kudymkar (the district's administrative centre) by road. Kozlova is the nearest rural locality.
