= Petukhova =

Petukhova Петухова
- Village
- Location within Perm Krai Location within Russia
- Coordinates: 59°14′N 54°56′E
- Country: Russia
- Region: Perm Krai
- District: Kudymkarsky District
- Time zone: UTC+5:00

Petukhova (Russian: Петухова) is a rural locality (a village) in Oshibskoye Rural Settlement, Kudymkarsky District, Perm Krai, Russia. The population was 96 as of 2010. There are 7 streets.

== Geography ==
Petukhova is located 36 km northeast of Kudymkar (the district's administrative centre) by road. Patrukova is the nearest rural locality.
