= Karbas =

Karbas Карбас
- Village
- Location within Perm Krai Location within Russia
- Coordinates: 59°11′N 54°30′E
- Country: Russia
- Region: Perm Krai
- District: Kudymkarsky District
- Time zone: UTC+5:00

Karbas (Russian: Карбас) is a rural locality (a village) in Beloyevskoye Rural Settlement, Kudymkarsky District, Perm Krai, Russia. The population was 153 as of 2010. There are 7 streets.

== Geography ==
Karbas is located 26 km north of Kudymkar (the district's administrative centre) by road. Ilyichi is the nearest rural locality.
