= Kozhina, Perm Krai =

Kozhina Кожина
- Village
- Location within Perm Krai Location within Russia
- Coordinates: 58°59′N 54°36′E
- Country: Russia
- Region: Perm Krai
- District: Kudymkarsky District
- Time zone: UTC+5:00

Kozhina (Russian: Кожина) is a rural locality (a village) in Stepanovskoye Rural Settlement, Kudymkarsky District, Perm Krai, Russia. The population was 24 as of 2010.

== Geography ==
Kozhina is located 5 km southwest of Kudymkar (the district's administrative centre) by road. Tikhy is the nearest rural locality.
