= Verkh-Inva =

Verkh-Inva Верх-Иньва
- Selo
- Location within Perm Krai Location within Russia
- Coordinates: 58°55′N 54°19′E
- Country: Russia
- Region: Perm Krai
- District: Kudymkarsky District
- Time zone: UTC+5:00

Verkh-Inva (Russian: Верх-Иньва) is a rural locality (a selo) and the administrative center of Verkh-Invenskoye Rural Settlement, Kudymkarsky District, Perm Krai, Russia. The population was 1,137 as of 2010. There are 28 streets.

== Geography ==
Verkh-Inva is located 25 km southwest of Kudymkar (the district's administrative centre) by road. Kuzolova is the nearest rural locality.
