= Martina, Perm Krai =

Martina Мартина
- Village
- Location within Perm Krai Location within Russia
- Coordinates: 59°08′N 54°40′E
- Country: Russia
- Region: Perm Krai
- District: Kudymkarsky District
- Time zone: UTC+5:00

Martina (Russian: Мартина) is a rural locality (a village) in Yorgvinskoye Rural Settlement, Kudymkarsky District, Perm Krai, Russia. The population was 62 as of 2010.

== Geography ==
Martina is located 18 km north of Kudymkar (the district's administrative centre) by road. Alekova is the nearest rural locality.
