= Stepanova, Perm Krai =

Stepanova Степанова
- Village
- Location within Perm Krai Location within Russia
- Coordinates: 58°59′N 54°41′E
- Country: Russia
- Region: Perm Krai
- District: Kudymkarsky District
- Time zone: UTC+5:00

Stepanova (Russian: Степанова) is a rural locality (a village) and the administrative center of Stepanovskoye Rural Settlement, Kudymkarsky District, Perm Krai, Russia. The population was 542 as of 2010. There are 17 streets.

== Geography ==
Stepanova is located 6 km south of Kudymkar (the district's administrative centre) by road. Yurino is the nearest rural locality.
