= Tikhonyata =

Tikhonyata Тихонята
- Village
- Location within Perm Krai Location within Russia
- Coordinates: 58°44′N 54°48′E
- Country: Russia
- Region: Perm Krai
- District: Kudymkarsky District
- Time zone: UTC+5:00

Tikhonyata (Russian: Тихонята) is a rural locality (a village) in Leninskoye Rural Settlement, Kudymkarsky District, Perm Krai, Russia. The population was 15 as of 2010.

== Geography ==
Tikhonyata is located 42 km southeast of Kudymkar (the district's administrative centre) by road. Pyatina is the nearest rural locality.
