= Otevo =

Otevo Отево
- Selo
- Location within Perm Krai Location within Russia
- Coordinates: 59°04′N 54°34′E
- Country: Russia
- Region: Perm Krai
- District: Kudymkarsky District
- Time zone: UTC+5:00

Otevo (Russian: Отево) is a rural locality (a selo) in Beloyevskoye Rural Settlement, Kudymkarsky District, Perm Krai, Russia. The population was 112 as of 2010. There are 6 streets.

== Geography ==
Otevo is located 10 km northwest of Kudymkar (the district's administrative centre) by road. Zapolye is the nearest rural locality.
