= Ganina, Perm Krai =

Ganina Ганина
- Village
- Location within Perm Krai Location within Russia
- Coordinates: 58°59′N 54°08′E
- Country: Russia
- Region: Perm Krai
- District: Kudymkarsky District
- Time zone: UTC+5:00

Ganina (Russian: Ганина) is a rural locality (a village) in Verkh-Invenskoye Rural Settlement, Kudymkarsky District, Perm Krai, Russia. The population was 21 as of 2010. There is 1 street.

== Geography ==
Ganina is located 44 km west of Kudymkar (the district's administrative centre) by road. Cheremnova is the nearest rural locality.
