= Vazh-Pashnya =

Vazh-Pashnya Важ-Пашня
- Village
- Location within Perm Krai Location within Russia
- Coordinates: 59°08′N 54°10′E
- Country: Russia
- Region: Perm Krai
- District: Kudymkarsky District
- Time zone: UTC+5:00

Vazh-Pashnya (Russian: Важ-Пашня) is a rural locality (a village) in Beloyevskoye Rural Settlement, Kudymkarsky District, Perm Krai, Russia. The population was 82 as of 2010.

== Geography ==
Vazh-Pashnya is located 40 km northwest of Kudymkar (the district's administrative centre) by road. Kuva is the nearest rural locality.
