= Ivukova =

Ivukova Ивукова
- Village
- Location within Perm Krai Location within Russia
- Coordinates: 58°58′N 54°36′E
- Country: Russia
- Region: Perm Krai
- District: Kudymkarsky District
- Time zone: UTC+5:00

Ivukova (Russian: Ивукова) is a rural locality (a village) in Stepanovskoye Rural Settlement, Kudymkarsky District, Perm Krai, Russia. The population was 206 as of 2010. There are 10 streets.

== Geography ==
Ivukova is located 6 km southwest of Kudymkar (the district's administrative centre) by road. Peshnigort is the nearest rural locality.
