= Oshova =

Oshova Ошова
- Village
- Location within Perm Krai Location within Russia
- Coordinates: 58°42′N 54°44′E
- Country: Russia
- Region: Perm Krai
- District: Kudymkarsky District
- Time zone: UTC+5:00

Oshova (Russian: Ошова) is a rural locality (a village) in Leninskoye Rural Settlement, Kudymkarsky District, Perm Krai, Russia. The population was 29 as of 2010.

== Geography ==
Oshova is located 39 km south of Kudymkar (the district's administrative centre) by road. Balkachi is the nearest rural locality.
