= Yogva =

Yogva Ёгва
- Selo
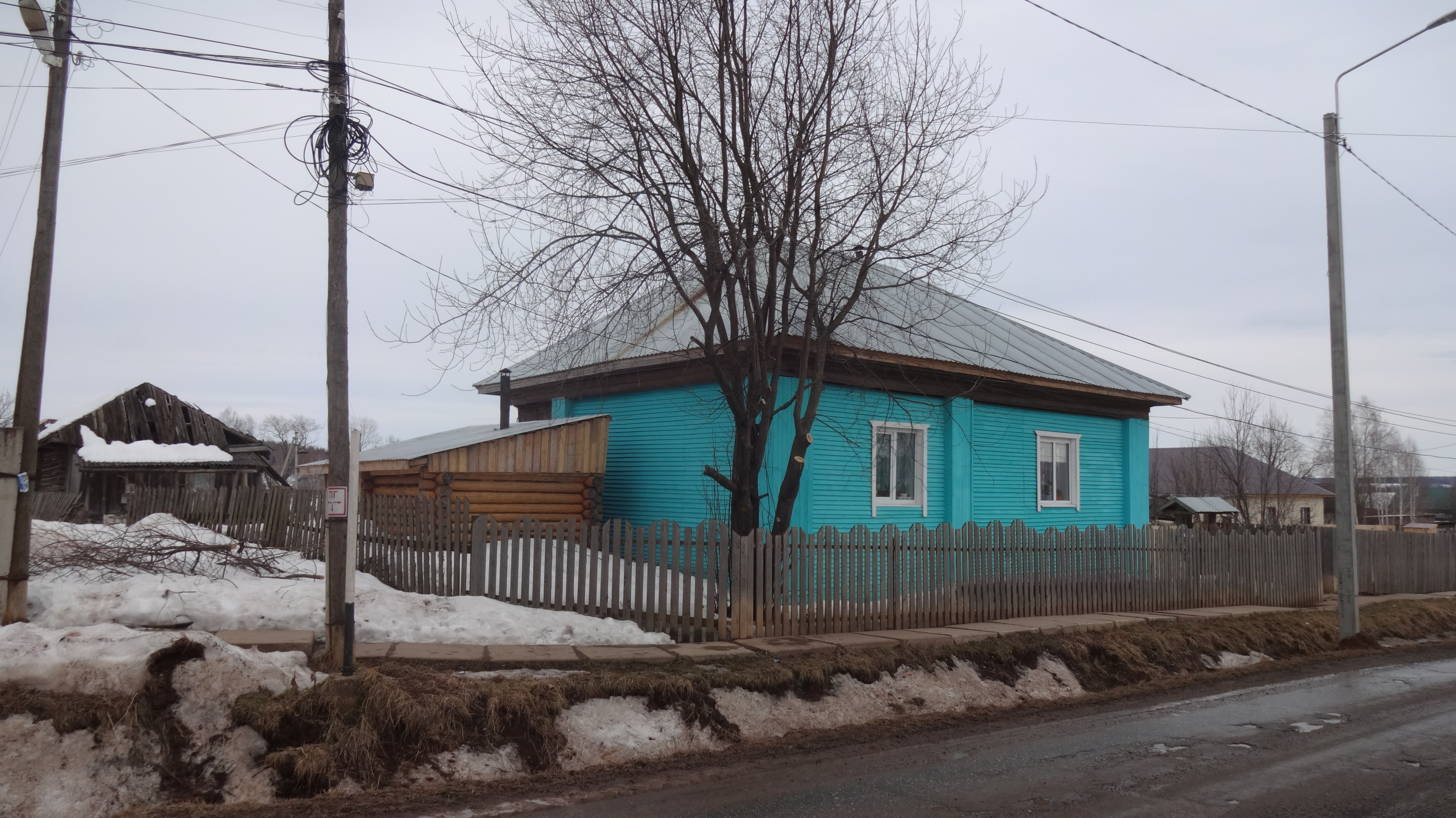
- Historic house at 14 Likhachov Street, Yogva

- Location within Perm Krai Location within Russia
- Coordinates: 59°06′N 54°46′E
- Country: Russia
- Region: Perm Krai
- District: Kudymkarsky District
- Time zone: UTC+5:00

Yogva (Russian: Ёгва) is a rural locality (a selo) and the administrative center of Yorgvinskoye Rural Settlement, Kudymkarsky District, Perm Krai, Russia. The population was 760 as of 2010. There are 30 streets.

== Geography ==
Yogva is located on the Yegva River, 13 km northeast of Kudymkar (the district's administrative centre) by road. Samchikova is the nearest rural locality.
