= Vas-Palnik =

Vas-Palnik Вась-Пальник
- Village
- Location within Perm Krai Location within Russia
- Coordinates: 59°06′N 54°32′E
- Country: Russia
- Region: Perm Krai
- District: Kudymkarsky District
- Time zone: UTC+5:00

Vas-Palnik (Russian: Вась-Пальник) is a rural locality (a village) in Beloyevskoye Rural Settlement, Kudymkarsky District, Perm Krai, Russia. The population was 2 as of 2010.

== Geography ==
Vas-Palnik is located 15 km northwest of Kudymkar (the district's administrative centre) by road. Minyadyn is the nearest rural locality.
