= Arefyeva =

Arefyeva Арефьева
- Village
- Location within Perm Krai Location within Russia
- Coordinates: 59°11′N 54°37′E
- Country: Russia
- Region: Perm Krai
- District: Kudymkarsky District
- Time zone: UTC+5:00

Arefyeva (Russian: Арефьева) is a rural locality (a village) in Yorgvinskoye Rural Settlement, Kudymkarsky District, Perm Krai, Russia. The population was 26 as of 2010.

== Geography ==
Arefyeva is located 27 km north of Kudymkar (the district's administrative centre) by road. Molova is the nearest rural locality.
