= Polva, Perm Krai =

Polva Полва
- Selo
- Location within Perm Krai Location within Russia
- Coordinates: 58°40′N 54°27′E
- Country: Russia
- Region: Perm Krai
- District: Kudymkarsky District
- Time zone: UTC+5:00

Polva (Russian: Полва) is a rural locality (a selo) in Leninskoye Rural Settlement, Kudymkarsky District, Perm Krai, Russia. The population was 330 as of 2010. There are 9 streets.

== Geography ==
Polva is located 57 km southwest of Kudymkar (the district's administrative centre) by road. Karpina is the nearest rural locality.
