= Pyatina, Perm Krai =

Pyatina Пятина
- Village
- Location within Perm Krai Location within Russia
- Coordinates: 58°44′N 54°48′E
- Country: Russia
- Region: Perm Krai
- District: Kudymkarsky District
- Time zone: UTC+5:00

Pyatina (Russian: Пятина) is a rural locality (a village) in Leninskoye Rural Settlement, Kudymkarsky District, Perm Krai, Russia. The population was 69 as of 2010.

== Geography ==
Pyatina is located 41 km south of Kudymkar (the district's administrative centre) by road. Tikhonyata is the nearest rural locality.
