= Vyrova =

Vyrova Вырова
- Village
- Location within Perm Krai Location within Russia
- Coordinates: 58°58′N 54°32′E
- Country: Russia
- Region: Perm Krai
- District: Kudymkarsky District
- Time zone: UTC+5:00

Vyrova (Russian: Вырова) is a rural locality (a village) in Stepanovskoye Rural Settlement, Kudymkarsky District, Perm Krai, Russia. The population was 163 as of 2010. There are 4 streets.

== Geography ==
Vyrova is located 12 km southwest of Kudymkar (the district's administrative centre) by road. Zarechny Peshnigort is the nearest rural locality.
