= Gavrukova =

Gavrukova Гаврукова
- Village
- Location within Perm Krai Location within Russia
- Coordinates: 58°57′N 54°17′E
- Country: Russia
- Region: Perm Krai
- District: Kudymkarsky District
- Time zone: UTC+5:00

Gavrukova (Russian: Гаврукова) is a rural locality (a village) in Verkh-Invenskoye Rural Settlement, Kudymkarsky District, Perm Krai, Russia. The population was 114 as of 2010. There are 10 streets.

== Geography ==
Gavrukova is located 29 km southwest of Kudymkar (the district's administrative centre) by road. Kalinina is the nearest rural locality.
