= Kiprusheva =

Kiprusheva Кипрушева
- Village
- Location within Perm Krai Location within Russia
- Coordinates: 59°06′N 54°19′E
- Country: Russia
- Region: Perm Krai
- District: Kudymkarsky District
- Time zone: UTC+5:00

Kiprusheva (Russian: Кипрушева) is a rural locality (a village) in Beloyevskoye Rural Settlement, Kudymkarsky District, Perm Krai, Russia. The population was 8 as of 2010.

== Geography ==
Kiprusheva is located 32 km northwest of Kudymkar (the district's administrative centre) by road. Maltseva is the nearest rural locality.
