= Bystry, Perm Krai =

Bystry Быстрый
- Settlement
- Location within Perm Krai Location within Russia
- Coordinates: 58°59′N 54°38′E
- Country: Russia
- Region: Perm Krai
- District: Kudymkarsky District
- Time zone: UTC+5:00

Bystry (Russian: Быстрый) is a rural locality (a settlement) in Stepanovskoye Rural Settlement, Kudymkarsky District, Perm Krai, Russia. The population was 187 as of 2010. There are 9 streets.

== Geography ==
Bystry is located 4 km south of Kudymkar (the district's administrative centre) by road. Yurino is the nearest rural locality.
