= Putoyeva =

Putoyeva Путоева
- Village
- Location within Perm Krai Location within Russia
- Coordinates: 58°57′N 54°00′E
- Country: Russia
- Region: Perm Krai
- District: Kudymkarsky District
- Time zone: UTC+5:00

Putoyeva (Russian: Путоева) is a rural locality (a village) in Verkh-Invenskoye Rural Settlement, Kudymkarsky District, Perm Krai, Russia. The population was 11 as of 2010. There is 1 street.

== Geography ==
Putoyeva is located 49 km west of Kudymkar (the district's administrative centre) by road. Nesterova is the nearest rural locality.
