= Romanova, Perm Krai =

Romanova Романова
- Village
- Location within Perm Krai Location within Russia
- Coordinates: 59°02′N 54°37′E
- Country: Russia
- Region: Perm Krai
- District: Kudymkarsky District
- Time zone: UTC+5:00

Romanova (Russian: Романова) is a rural locality (a village) in Stepanovskoye Rural Settlement, Kudymkarsky District, Perm Krai, Russia. The population was 52 as of 2010. There are 9 streets.

== Geography ==
Romanova is located 4 km northwest of Kudymkar (the district's administrative centre) by road. Kudymkar is the nearest rural locality.
