= Sylvozh =

Sylvozh Сылвож
- Village
- Location within Perm Krai Location within Russia
- Coordinates: 58°45′N 54°45′E
- Country: Russia
- Region: Perm Krai
- District: Kudymkarsky District
- Time zone: UTC+5:00

Sylvozh (Russian: Сылвож) is a rural locality (a village) in Leninskoye Rural Settlement, Kudymkarsky District, Perm Krai, Russia. The population was 89 as of 2010. There are five streets.

== Geography ==
Sylvozh is located 37 km south of Kudymkar (the district's administrative centre) by road. Bagrova is the nearest rural locality.
