= Zarechny Peshnigort =

Zarechny Peshnigort Заречный Пешнигорт
- Village
- Location within Perm Krai Location within Russia
- Coordinates: 58°58′N 54°33′E
- Country: Russia
- Region: Perm Krai
- District: Kudymkarsky District
- Time zone: UTC+5:00

Zarechny Peshnigort (Russian: Заречный Пешнигорт) is a rural locality (a village) in Stepanovskoye Rural Settlement, Kudymkarsky District, Perm Krai, Russia. The population was 68 as of 2010.

== Geography ==
Zarechny Peshnigort is located 9 km southwest of Kudymkar (the district's administrative centre) by road. Peshnigort is the nearest rural locality.
