= Kekur (Stepanovskoye Rural Settlement), Kudymkarsky District, Perm Krai =

Kekur Кекур
- Village
- Location within Perm Krai Location within Russia
- Coordinates: 58°55′N 54°39′E
- Country: Russia
- Region: Perm Krai
- District: Kudymkarsky District
- Time zone: UTC+5:00

Kekur (Russian: Кекур) is a rural locality (a village) in Stepanovskoye Rural Settlement, Kudymkarsky District, Perm Krai, Russia. The population was 355 as of 2010.

== Geography ==
It is located 8 km south from Kudymkar.
