= Savina (Yogvinskoye Rural Settlement), Kudymkarsky District, Perm Krai =

Savina Савина
- Village
- Location within Perm Krai Location within Russia
- Coordinates: 59°10′N 54°40′E
- Country: Russia
- Region: Perm Krai
- District: Kudymkarsky District
- Time zone: UTC+5:00

Savina (Russian: Савина) is a rural locality (a village) in Yorgvinskoye Rural Settlement, Kudymkarsky District, Perm Krai, Russia. The population was 70 as of 2010.

== Geography ==
It is located 22 km north from Kudymkar.
