= Baranova (Oshibskoye Rural Settlement, Kudymkarsky District, Perm Krai) =

Baranova Баранова
- Village
- Location within Perm Krai Location within Russia
- Coordinates: 59°15′N 54°43′E
- Country: Russia
- Region: Perm Krai
- District: Kudymkarsky District
- Time zone: UTC+5:00

Baranova (Russian: Баранова) is a rural locality (a village) in Oshibskoye Rural Settlement, Kudymkarsky District, Perm Krai, Russia. The population was 95 as of 2010.

== Geography ==
It is located 43 km north from Kudymkar.
