= Pyotr Subbotin-Permyak =

Russian painter

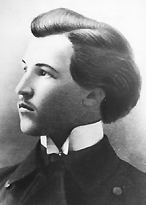
Pyotr Ivanovich Subbotin-Permyak

Pyotr Ivanovich Subbotin-Permyak (Russian: Пётр Ива́нович Суббо́тин-Пермя́к, 18 November 1886 in Kudymkar – 6 January 1923) was a Russian avant-garde painter, the professor of decorative painting. He was an author of more than 40 paintings and about 100 drawings.

== Biography ==
Pyotr Subbotin-Permyak was born in the city of Kudymkar, in the Solikamsky Uyezd of the Perm Governorate of the Russian Empire (now in Komi-Permyak Okrug of Perm Krai, Russia). In 1914 he finished the Stroganov Artistic and Industrial College in Moscow and lectured there till 1918. Since 1919 Subbotin-Permyak worked in Perm Governorate. He founded the artistic workshops in Perm, Kudymkar and Kungur, which became the basis of artistic education in the region. He was the first director of Perm Artistic Secondary School. Subbotin-Permyak founded the Komi-Permyak District Museum of Ethnography, which now uses his name.

In his works Subbotin-Permyak combined the traditions of Komi-Permyak folk art and the achievements of avant-garde painting of the beginning of the Twentieth Century. His works are stored in Komi-Permyak District Museum of Ethnography and Perm State Artistic Gallery.

Subbotin-Permyak died on 6 January 1923 and was buried at Yegoshikha Cemetery in Perm. In 2001 new monument was installed at his tomb.

== Gallery ==
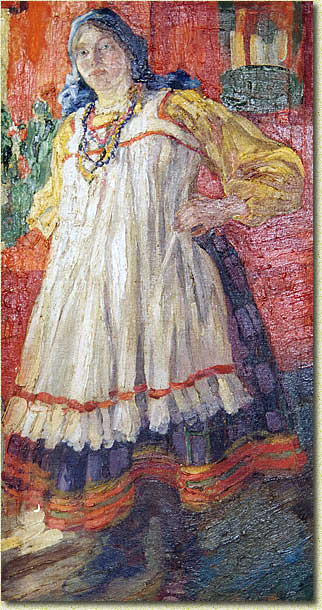
A woman from Voronezh. 1912.

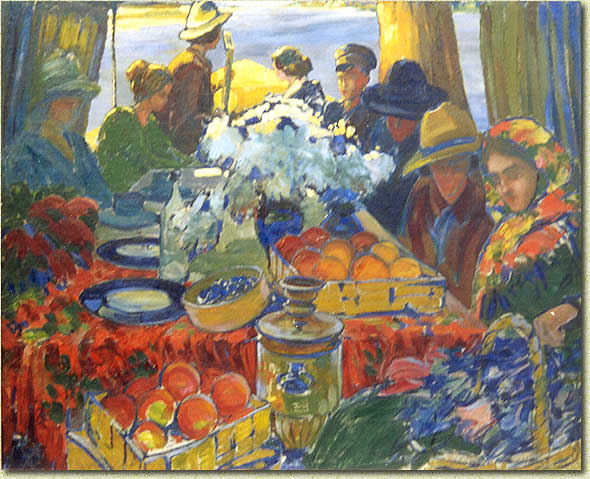
Down the river. 1918.

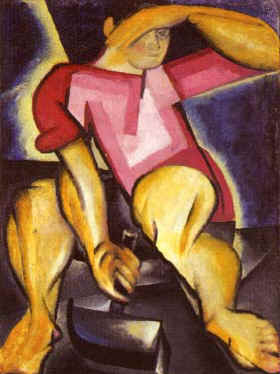
Worker. 1921.

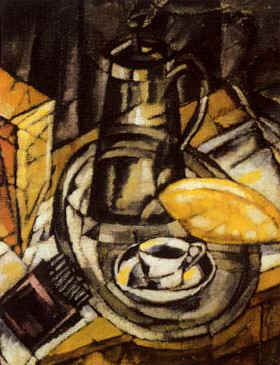
Still life with rolls and tea-things. 1921.

== See also ==
- (in Russian) О. М. Власова. Художник П. И. Субботин-Пермяк. — Пермь, 1990.
