= Kudymkar =

Town in Perm Krai, Russia

Kudymkar Кудымкар
- Town
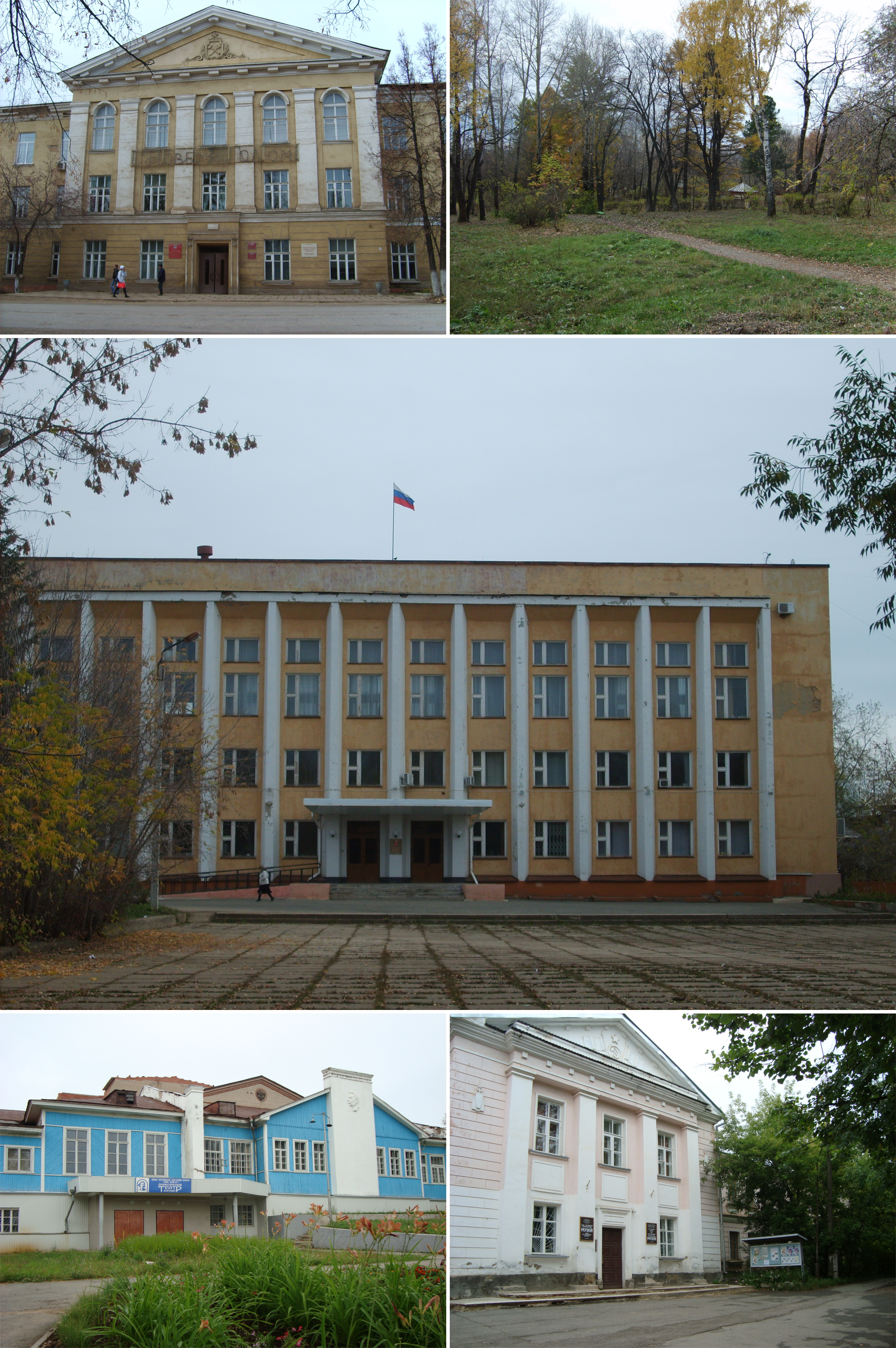
- Left to right, top to bottom: Kudymkar Town Administration building, Park of Culture and Leisure; Ministry of Komi-Permyak Okrug Affairs; Komi-Permyak Okrug Theater of Drama, Komi-Permyak Museum of local lore

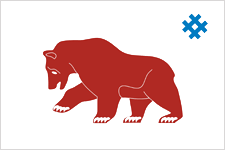
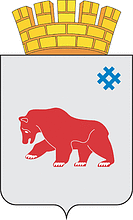
- Flag Coat of arms
- Interactive map of Kudymkar
- Location of Kudymkar Kudymkar (Perm Krai)
- Coordinates: 59°01′N 54°40′E
- Country: Russia
- Federal subject: Perm Krai
- First mentioned: 1579
- Town status since: 1938

Government
  - Head: Alexander Klimovich
- Elevation: 180 m (590 ft)

Population (2010 Census)
  - Total: 28,967
  - Estimate (2023): 28,630 (−1.2%)

Administrative status
  - Subordinated to: town of krai significance of Kudymkar
  - Capital of: Komi-Permyak Okrug, Kudymkarsky District

Municipal status
  - Urban okrug: Kudymkar Urban Okrug
  - Capital of: Kudymkar Urban Okrug, Kudymkarsky Municipal District
- Time zone: UTC+5 (MSK+2)
- Postal code: 619000
- Dialing code: +7 34260
- OKTMO ID: 57851000001

Kudymkar (Russian: Куды́мкар; Komi: Кудінкар, Kudinkar; Komi-Permyak: Кудымкар, Kudymkar), is a town and the administrative center of Komi-Permyak Okrug of Perm Krai, Russia. Until 2005, it was the administrative center of Komi-Permyak Autonomous Okrug, a federal subject of Russia. It is located on the Inva River and on the left bank of its tributary the Kuva; 201 kilometers (125 mi) from Perm by road. Population: 28,967 (2010 census).

== History ==
It was first mentioned in 1579. In 1931, it was granted urban-type settlement status. In 1938, town status was granted.

== Administrative and municipal status ==
Within the framework of administrative divisions, Kudymkar serves as the administrative center of Komi-Permyak Okrug, an administrative unit with special status within Perm Krai, and of Kudymkarsky District, even though it is not a part of it. As an administrative division, it is incorporated separately as the town of krai significance of Kudymkar—an administrative unit with the status equal to that of the districts. As a municipal division, the town of krai significance of Kudymkar is incorporated as Kudymkar Urban Okrug.

== Economy ==
Most important companies are OAO "Moloko" (dairy products) and OAO "Myasokombinat" (meat products). There are also some other food industry companies.

== Demographics ==
As of the 2002 Census, 64% of population were Komi-Permyak people; 33% were Russians.

Historical population of Kudymkar:

- 1959: 21,800
- 1970: 26,400
- 1979: 28,400
- 1989: 33,451
- 2002: 31,914
- 2010: 28,967

== Notable residents ==
- Pyotr Subbotin-Permyak (1886–1923), avant-garde painter, professor of decorative painting
