= Kudymkarsky District =

Kudymkarsky District Кудымкарский район (Russian)
- District
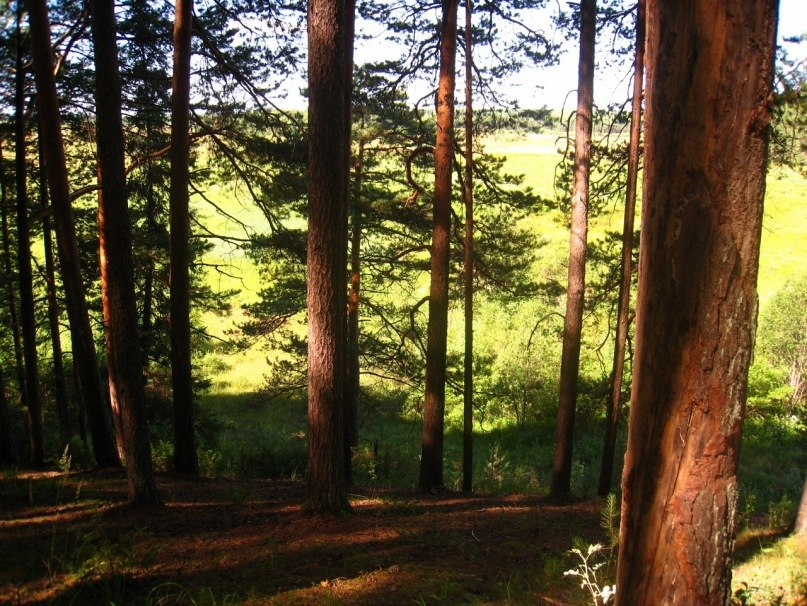
- Kuva Forest, in Kudymkarsky District

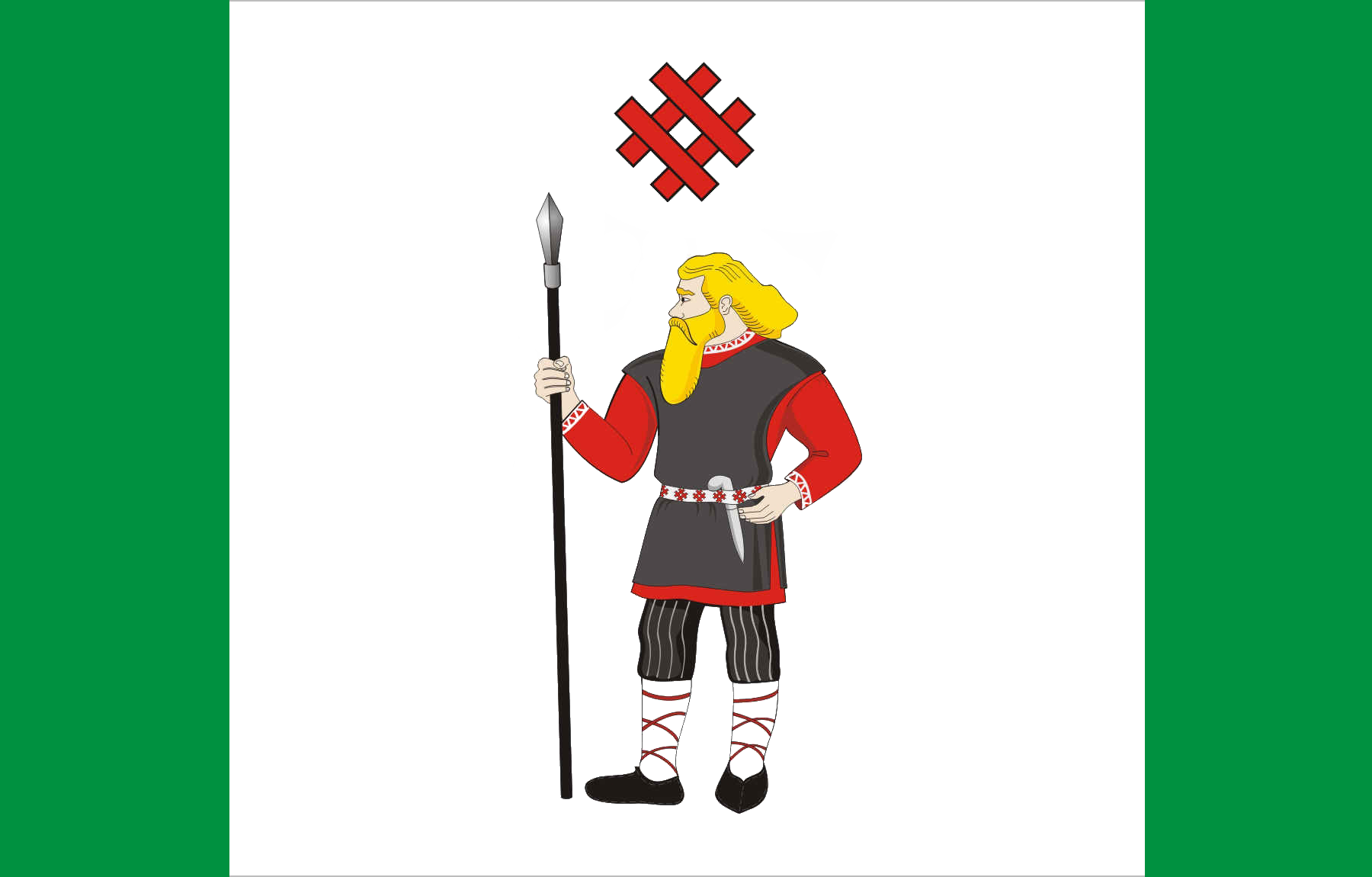
- Flag Coat of arms
- Location of Kudymkarsky District in Komi-Permyak Okrug, Perm Krai
- Coordinates: 59.098°N 54.290°E
- Country: Russia
- Federal subject: Perm Krai
- Established: February 27, 1924
- Administrative center: Kudymkar

Area
  - Total: 4,741 km^{2} (1,831 sq mi)

Population (2010 Census)
  - Total: 25,808
  - Density: 5.444/km^{2} (14.10/sq mi)
  - Urban: 0%
  - Rural: 100%

Administrative structure
  - Inhabited localities: 275 rural localities

Municipal structure
  - Municipally incorporated as: Kudymkarsky Municipal District
  - Municipal divisions: 0 urban settlements, 6 rural settlements
- Time zone: UTC+5 (MSK+2)
- OKTMO ID: 57821000
- Website: http://www.kudraion.ru/

Kudymkarsky District (Komi-Permyak: Кудымкар район, Russian: Куды́мкарский райо́н) is an administrative district (raion) of Komi-Permyak Okrug in Perm Krai, Russia; one of the thirty-three in the krai. As a municipal division, it is incorporated as Kudymkarsky Municipal District. It is located in the west of the krai. The area of the district is 4,741 square kilometers (1,831 sq mi). Its administrative center is the town of Kudymkar (which is not administratively a part of the district). Population: 25,808 (2010 census); 29,528 (2002 census); 35,392 (1989 Soviet census).

== Geography ==
Main rivers flowing through the district include the Ivna, the Kuva, and the Velva.

== History ==
The district was established on February 27, 1924.

== Administrative and municipal status ==
Within the framework of administrative divisions, Kudymkarsky District is one of the thirty-three in the krai. The town of Kudymkar serves as its administrative center, despite being incorporated separately as a town of krai significance—an administrative unit with the status equal to that of the districts.

As a municipal division, the district is incorporated as Kudymkarsky Municipal District. The town of krai significance of Kudymkar is incorporated separately from the district as Kudymkar Urban Okrug.

== Demographics ==
Ethnic composition (as of the 2002 Census):

- Komi-Permyak people: 85.3%
- Russians: 13.9%

== Economy ==
The economy of the district is based on forestry, timber industry, and agriculture.

== See also ==
- Zarechny Peshnigort

== Sources ==
- Законодательное собрание Пермской области. Закон №416-67 от 28 февраля 1996 г. «Об административно-территориальном устройстве Пермского края», в ред. Закона №504-ПК от 9 июля 2015 г. «О внесении изменений в Закон Пермской области "Об административно-территориальном устройстве Пермского края"». Вступил в силу с момента опубликования. Опубликован: "Звезда", №38, 12 марта 1996 г. (Legislative Assembly of Perm Oblast. Law #416-67 of February 28, 1996 On the Administrative-Territorial Structure of Perm Krai, as amended by the Law #504-PK of July 9, 2015 On Amending the Law of Perm Oblast "On the Administrative-Territorial Structure of Perm Krai". Effective as of the moment of publication.).
- Законодательное собрание Коми-Пермяцкого автономного округа. Закон №53 от 4 июля 2005 г. «Об утверждении границ и о наделении статусом муниципальных образований Кудымкарского района Пермского края», в ред. Закона №438-ПК от 2 февраля 2015 г. «О внесении изменений в отдельные Законы Пермской области и Коми-Пермяцкого автономного округа». Вступил в силу через 10 дней со дня официального опубликования. Опубликован: "Парма", №144–145, 12 июля 2005 г. (Legislative Assembly of Komi-Permyak Autonomous Okrug. Law #53 of July 4, 2005 On Establishing the Borders and on Granting the Status to the Municipal Formations of Kudymkarsky District of Perm Krai, as amended by the Law #438-PK of February 2, 2015 On Amending Various Laws of Perm Oblast and Komi-Permyak Autonomous Okrug. Effective as of the day which is 10 days following the day of the official publication.).
- Законодательное собрание Коми-Пермяцкого автономного округа. Закон №54 от 4 июля 2005 г. «Об утверждении границ и о наделении статусом муниципального образования "Город Кудымкар" Пермского края», в ред. Закона №499-ПК от 16 октября 2009 г «О внесении изменений в отдельные законодательные акты Пермской области и Коми-Пермяцкого автономного округа». Вступил в силу через десять дней со дня официального опубликования. Опубликован: "Парма", №144–145, 12 июля 2005 г. (Legislative Assembly of Komi-Permyak Autonomous Okrug. Law #54 of July 4, 2005 On Establishing the Borders and on Granting the Status to the Municipal Formation of the "Town of Kudymkar" of Perm Krai, as amended by the Law #499-PK of October 16, 2009 On Amending Various Legislative Acts of Perm Oblast and Komi-Permyak Autonomous Okrug. Effective as of the day which is ten days following the day of the official publication.).
