= Kononovo =

Kononovo may refer to:

- Kononovo, Perm Krai, a Russian village in the Dobryansky District
- Kononovo, Vashkinsky District, Vologda Oblast, a Russian village in the Andreyevskoye Rural Settlement
- Kononovo, Vladimir Oblast, a Russian village in the Melenkovsky District
- Kononovo, Ustyuzhensky District, Vologda Oblast, a Russian village in the Soshnevskoye Rural Settlement
