= Anokhino =

Anokhino (Russian: Анохино) is the name of the following rural localities in Russia:

- Anokhino, Kovrovsky District, Vladimir Oblast, a village in Novoselskoye Rural Settlement of Kovrovsky District, Vladimir Oblast
- Anokhino, Melenkovsky District, Vladimir Oblast, a village in Lyakhovskoye Rural Settlement of Melenkovsky District, Vladimir Oblast
- Anokhino, Vologda Oblast, a village in Sidorovskoye Rural Settlement of Gryazovetsky District, Vologda Oblast
