= Stepankovo =

Stepankovo is the name of several rural localities in Russia:

- Stepankovo, Melenkovsky District, Vladimir Oblast
- Stepankovo, Muromsky District, Vladimir Oblast
- Stepankovo, Sobinsky District, Vladimir Oblast
