= Besmelyata =

Besmelyata Бесмелята
- Village
- Location within Perm Krai Location within Russia
- Coordinates: 58°29′N 56°08′E
- Country: Russia
- Region: Perm Krai
- District: Dobryansky District
- Time zone: UTC+5:00

Besmelyata (Russian: Бесмелята) is a rural locality (a village) in Dobryansky District, Perm Krai, Russia. The population was 3 as of 2010. There are 2 streets.

== Geography ==
Besmelyata is located 44 km west of Dobryanka (the district's administrative centre) by road. Tyulka is the nearest rural locality.
