= Ratnovo =

Ratnovo Ратново
- Village
- Location within Vladimir Oblast Location within Russia
- Coordinates: 55°21′N 41°32′E
- Country: Russia
- Region: Vladimir Oblast
- District: Melenkovsky District
- Time zone: UTC+3:00

Ratnovo (Russian: Ратново) is a rural locality (a village) in Danilovskoye Rural Settlement, Melenkovsky District, Vladimir Oblast, Russia. The population was 176 as of 2010.

== Geography ==
Ratnovo is located 7 km west of Melenki (the district's administrative centre) by road. Bolshoy Priklon is the nearest rural locality.
