= Chabyshevo =

Chabyshevo Чабышево
- Village
- Location within Vladimir Oblast Location within Russia
- Coordinates: 55°34′N 41°44′E
- Country: Russia
- Region: Vladimir Oblast
- District: Melenkovsky District
- Time zone: UTC+3:00

Chabyshevo (Russian: Чабышево) is a rural locality (a village) in Denyatinskoye Rural Settlement, Melenkovsky District, Vladimir Oblast, Russia. The population was 18 as of 2010. There are 4 streets.

== Geography ==
Chabyshevo is located on the Kartyn River, 32 km (20 mi) north of Melenki (the district's administrative centre) by road. Papulino is the nearest rural locality.
