= Kochetki =

Kochetki Кочетки
- Village
- Location within Vladimir Oblast Location within Russia
- Coordinates: 55°14′N 41°08′E
- Country: Russia
- Region: Vladimir Oblast
- District: Melenkovsky District
- Time zone: UTC+3:00

Kochetki (Russian: Кочетки) is a rural locality (a village) in Danilovskoye Rural Settlement, Melenkovsky District, Vladimir Oblast, Russia. The population was 2 as of 2010. There is 1 street.

== Geography ==
The village is located 30 km (19 mi) south-west from Danilovo, 41 km (25 mi) south-west from Melenki.
