= Kaznevo =

Kaznevo Казнево
- Selo
- Location within Vladimir Oblast Location within Russia
- Coordinates: 55°17′N 41°55′E
- Country: Russia
- Region: Vladimir Oblast
- District: Melenkovsky District
- Time zone: UTC+3:00

Kaznevo (Russian: Казнево) is a rural locality (a selo) in Lyakhovskoye Rural Settlement, Melenkovsky District, Vladimir Oblast, Russia. The population was 47 as of 2010. There are 5 streets.

== Geography ==
Kaznevo is located on the Oka River, 24 km (15 mi) southeast of Melenki (the district's administrative centre) by road. Lyakhi is the nearest rural locality.
