= Prudnya =

Prudnya Прудня
- Village
- Location within Vladimir Oblast Location within Russia
- Coordinates: 55°25′N 41°40′E
- Country: Russia
- Region: Vladimir Oblast
- District: Melenkovsky District
- Time zone: UTC+3:00

Prudnya (Russian: Прудня) is a rural locality (a village) in Denyatinskoye Rural Settlement, Melenkovsky District, Vladimir Oblast, Russia. The population was 117 as of 2010. There are 2 streets.

== Geography ==
Prudnya is located 11 km north of Melenki (the district's administrative centre) by road. Luzhi is the nearest rural locality.
