= Borovkovo =

Borovkovo Боровково
- Village
- Location within Perm Krai Location within Russia
- Coordinates: 58°11′N 56°32′E
- Country: Russia
- Region: Perm Krai
- District: Dobryansky District
- Time zone: UTC+5:00

Borovkovo (Russian: Боровково) is a rural locality (a village) in Dobryansky District, Perm Krai, Russia. The population was 35 as of 2010. There are 5 streets.

== Geography ==
Borovkovo is located 51 km south of Dobryanka (the district's administrative centre) by road. Gari is the nearest rural locality.
