= Palniki =

Palniki Пальники
- Settlement
- Location within Perm Krai Location within Russia
- Coordinates: 58°10′N 56°24′E
- Country: Russia
- Region: Perm Krai
- District: Dobryansky District
- Time zone: UTC+5:00

Palniki (Russian: Пальники) is a rural locality (a settlement) in Dobryansky District, Perm Krai, Russia. The population was 568 as of 2010. There are 27 streets.

== Geography ==
Palniki is located 39 km south of Dobryanka (the district's administrative centre) by road. Adishchevo is the nearest rural locality.
