= Kyzh =

Kyzh (Russian: Кыж) is the name of several rural localities in Russia:

- Kyzh (village), a village in Dobryansky District, Perm Krai
- Kyzh (settlement), a settlement in Dobryansky District, Perm Krai
