= Bolshoy Priklon =

Bolshoy Priklon Большой Приклон
- Village
- Location within Vladimir Oblast Location within Russia
- Coordinates: 55°21′N 41°34′E
- Country: Russia
- Region: Vladimir Oblast
- District: Melenkovsky District
- Time zone: UTC+3:00

Bolshoy Priklon (Russian: Большой Приклон) is a rural locality (a village) in Danilovskoye Rural Settlement, Melenkovsky District, Vladimir Oblast, Russia. The population was 405 as of 2010. There are 3 streets.

== Geography ==
Bolshoy Priklon is located 5 km (3.1 mi) northwest of Melenki (the district's administrative centre) by road. Priklon is the nearest rural locality.
