= Merkushevo =

Merkushevo (Russian: Меркушево) is the name of several rural localities in Russia:

- Merkushevo, Dobryansky District, Perm Krai, a village in Dobryansky District, Perm Krai
- Merkushevo, Permsky District, Perm Krai, a village in Permsky District, Perm Krai
