= Konets Gor =

Konets Gor Конец Гор
- Village
- Location within Perm Krai Location within Russia
- Coordinates: 58°10′N 56°26′E
- Country: Russia
- Region: Perm Krai
- District: Dobryansky District
- Time zone: UTC+5:00

Konets Gor (Russian: Конец Гор) is a rural locality (a village) in Dobryansky District, Perm Krai, Russia. The population was 2 as of 2010. There are 12 streets.

== Geography ==
Konets Gor is located 46 km south of Dobryanka (the district's administrative centre) by road. Adishchevo is the nearest rural locality.
