= Ramen, Vladimir Oblast =

Ramen Рамень
- Village
- Location within Vladimir Oblast Location within Russia
- Coordinates: 55°11′N 41°28′E
- Country: Russia
- Region: Vladimir Oblast
- District: Melenkovsky District
- Time zone: UTC+3:00

Ramen (Russian: Рамень) is a rural locality (a village) in Ilkinskoye Settlement, Melenkovsky District, Vladimir Oblast, Russia. The population was 25 as of 2010.

== Geography ==
Ramen is located on the Ramenka River, 25 km southwest of Melenki (the district's administrative centre) by road. Dvoynovo is the nearest locality. etimologia
