= Verkhounzha =

Verkhounzha Верхоунжа
- Village
- Location within Vladimir Oblast Location within Russia
- Coordinates: 55°27′N 41°31′E
- Country: Russia
- Region: Vladimir Oblast
- District: Melenkovsky District
- Time zone: UTC+3:00

Verkhounzha (Russian: Верхоу́нжа) is a rural locality (a village) in Butylitskoye Rural Settlement, Melenkovsky District, Vladimir Oblast, Russia. The population was 187 as of 2010. There are 4 streets.

== Geography ==
Verkhounzha is located on the Unzha River, 17 km northwest of Melenki (the district's administrative centre) by road. Kopnino is the nearest rural locality.
