= Voynovo, Melenkovsky District, Vladimir Oblast =

Voynovo Войново
- Selo
- Location within Vladimir Oblast Location within Russia
- Coordinates: 55°16′N 41°37′E
- Country: Russia
- Region: Vladimir Oblast
- District: Melenkovsky District
- Time zone: UTC+3:00

Voynovo (Russian: Войново) is a rural locality (a selo) in Ilkinskoye Rural Settlement, Melenkovsky District, Vladimir Oblast, Russia. The population was 390 as of 2010. There are 3 streets.

== Geography ==
Voynovo is located on the Unzha River, 9 km south of Melenki (the district's administrative centre) by road. Lekhtovo is the nearest rural locality.
