= Adishchevo =

Adishchevo Адищево
- Village
- Location within Perm Krai Location within Russia
- Coordinates: 58°10′N 56°25′E
- Country: Russia
- Region: Perm Krai
- District: Dobryansky District
- Time zone: UTC+5:00
- Postal code: 618719

Adishchevo (Russian: Адищево) is a rural locality (a village) in Dobryansky District, Perm Krai, Russia. The population was 4 as of 2010. The area has a total of 15 streets within its boundaries.

== Geography ==
Adishchevo is located 45 km south of Dobryanka (the district's administrative centre) by road. Palniki is the nearest rural locality. Its postal code is 618719. The timezone for the location is Yekaterinburg Standard Time.
