= Nikulyata =

Nikulyata Никулята
- Village
- Location within Perm Krai Location within Russia
- Coordinates: 58°30′N 56°58′E
- Country: Russia
- Region: Perm Krai
- District: Dobryansky District
- Time zone: UTC+5:00

Nikulyata (Russian: Никулята) is a rural locality (a village) in Dobryansky District, Perm Krai, Russia. The population was 4 as of 2010. There is 1 street.

== Geography ==
Nikulyata is located 54 km east of Dobryanka (the district's administrative centre) by road. Golubyata is the nearest rural locality.
