= Bobki =

Bobki (Russian: Бобки) is the name of several rural localities in Russia:

- Bobki (village), Perm Krai, a village in Dobryansky District, Perm Krai
- Bobki (settlement), Perm Krai, a settlement in Dobryansky District, Perm Krai
