= Nikulino =

Nikulino (Russian: Никулино) is the name of several rural localities in Russia:

- Nikulino, Dobryansky District, Perm Krai, a selo in Dobryansky District, Perm Krai
- Nikulino, Permsky District, Perm Krai, a village in Permsky District, Perm Krai
