= Besovo =

Besovo Бесово
- Village
- Location within Perm Krai Location within Russia
- Coordinates: 58°19′N 56°25′E
- Country: Russia
- Region: Perm Krai
- District: Dobryansky District
- Time zone: UTC+5:00

Besovo (Russian: Бесово) is a rural locality (a village) in Dobryansky District, Perm Krai, Russia. The population was 4 as of 2010. There are 2 streets.

== Geography ==
Besovo is located 38 km south of Dobryanka (the district's administrative centre) by road. Konstantinovka is the nearest rural locality.
