= Krasnaya Sludka =

Krasnaya Sludka Красная Слудка
- Selo
- Location within Perm Krai Location within Russia
- Coordinates: 58°11′N 56°27′E
- Country: Russia
- Region: Perm Krai
- District: Dobryansky District
- Time zone: UTC+5:00

Krasnaya Sludka (Russian: Красная Слудка) is a rural locality (a selo) in Dobryansky District, Perm Krai, Russia. The population was 50 as of 2010. There are 36 streets.

== Geography ==
Krasnaya Sludka is located 46 km south of Dobryanka (the district's administrative centre) by road. Yelniki is the nearest rural locality.
