= Urvanovo =

Urvanovo Урваново
- Selo
- Location within Vladimir Oblast Location within Russia
- Coordinates: 55°26′N 42°01′E
- Country: Russia
- Region: Vladimir Oblast
- District: Melenkovsky District
- Time zone: UTC+3:00

Urvanovo (Russian: Урва́ново) is a rural locality (a selo) in Lyakhovskoye Rural Settlement, Melenkovsky District, Vladimir Oblast, Russia. The population was 394 as of 2010. There are 14 streets.

== Geography ==
Urvanovo is located on the Urvanovskoye Lake, 35 km northeast of Melenki (the district's administrative centre) by road. Usad is the nearest rural locality.
