= Kholkovsky =

Kholkovsky Хольковский
- Settlement
- Location within Vladimir Oblast Location within Russia
- Coordinates: 55°28′N 41°46′E
- Country: Russia
- Region: Vladimir Oblast
- District: Melenkovsky District
- Time zone: UTC+3:00

Kholkovsky (Russian: Хольковский) is a rural locality (a settlement) in Turgenevskoye Rural Settlement, Melenkovsky District, Vladimir Oblast, Russia. The population was 165 as of 2010. There are 2 streets.

== Geography ==
Kholkovsky is located 22 km (14 mi) northeast of Melenki (the district's administrative centre) by road. Krasnovo is the nearest rural locality.
