= Borodkino =

Borodkino Бородкино
- Village
- Location within Perm Krai Location within Russia
- Coordinates: 58°41′N 56°56′E
- Country: Russia
- Region: Perm Krai
- District: Dobryansky District
- Time zone: UTC+5:00

Borodkino (Russian: Бородкино) is a rural locality (a village) in Dobryansky District, Perm Krai, Russia. The population was 5 as of 2010.

== Geography ==
Borodkino is located 57 km northeast of Dobryanka (the district's administrative centre) by road. Tabory is the nearest rural locality.
