= Kukhtym =

Kukhtym (Russian: Кухтым) is the name of several rural localities in Russia:

- Kukhtym (railway station settlement), a settlement in Dobryansky District, Perm Krai
- Kukhtym (settlement), a settlement in Dobryansky District, Perm Krai
