= Venedeyevka =

Venedeyevka Венедеевка
- Village
- Location within Vladimir Oblast Location within Russia
- Coordinates: 55°19′N 41°46′E
- Country: Russia
- Region: Vladimir Oblast
- District: Melenkovsky District
- Time zone: UTC+3:00

Venedeyevka (Russian: Венедеевка) is a rural locality (a village) in Lyakhovskoye Rural Settlement, Melenkovsky District, Vladimir Oblast, Russia. The population was 24 as of 2010.

== Geography ==
Venedeyevka is located 9 km east of Melenki (the district's administrative centre) by road. Slavtsevo is the nearest rural locality.
