= Gurino =

Gurino Гурино
- Village
- Location within Perm Krai Location within Russia
- Coordinates: 58°30′N 56°11′E
- Country: Russia
- Region: Perm Krai
- District: Dobryansky District
- Time zone: UTC+5:00

Gurino (Russian: Гурино) is a rural locality (a village) in Dobryansky District, Perm Krai, Russia. The population was 8 as of 2010. There are 2 streets.

== Geography ==
Gurino is located 52 km northwest of Dobryanka (the district's administrative centre) by road. Yaganyata is the nearest rural locality.
