= Kopnino =

Kopnino Копнино
- Village
- Location within Vladimir Oblast Location within Russia
- Coordinates: 55°26′N 41°30′E
- Country: Russia
- Region: Vladimir Oblast
- District: Melenkovsky District
- Time zone: UTC+3:00

Kopnino (Russian: Копнино) is a rural locality (a village) in Butylitskoye Rural Settlement, Melenkovsky District, Vladimir Oblast, Russia. The population was 107 as of 2010. There are 3 streets.

== Geography ==
Kopnino is located on the Unzha River, 18 km (11 mi) north of Melenki (the district's administrative centre) by road. Verkhounzha is the nearest rural locality.
