= Yelino, Vladimir Oblast =

Yelino Елино
- Village
- Location within Vladimir Oblast Location within Russia
- Coordinates: 55°25′N 42°04′E
- Country: Russia
- Region: Vladimir Oblast
- District: Melenkovsky District
- Time zone: UTC+3:00

Yelino (Russian: Елино) is a rural locality (a village) in Lyakhovskoye Rural Settlement, Melenkovsky District, Vladimir Oblast, Russia. The population was 50 as of 2010. There are 4 streets. It is 176 miles(283 kilometers) east of Moscow.

== Geography ==
Yelino is located on the Oka River, 39 km northeast of Melenki (the district's administrative centre) by road. Anokhino is the nearest rural locality.
