= Pakhnino =

Pakhnino Пахнино
- Village
- Location within Perm Krai Location within Russia
- Coordinates: 58°26′N 56°21′E
- Country: Russia
- Region: Perm Krai
- District: Dobryansky District
- Time zone: UTC+5:00

Pakhnino (Russian: Пахнино) is a rural locality (a village) in Dobryansky District, Perm Krai, Russia. The population was 2 as of 2010. There is 1 street.

== Geography ==
Pakhnino is located 11 km west of Dobryanka (the district's administrative centre) by road. Rassokhi is the nearest rural locality.
