= Gorokhovo =

Gorokhovo Горохово
- Village
- Location within Vladimir Oblast Location within Russia
- Coordinates: 55°35′N 41°31′E
- Country: Russia
- Region: Vladimir Oblast
- District: Melenkovsky District
- Time zone: UTC+3:00

Gorokhovo (Russian: Горохово) is a rural locality (a village) in Butylitskoye Rural Settlement, Melenkovsky District, Vladimir Oblast, Russia. The population was 39 as of 2010.

== Geography ==
Gorokhovo is located 34 km (21 mi) north of Melenki (the district's administrative centre) by road. Skripino is the nearest rural locality.
