= Fursovo =

Fursovo Фурсово
- Village
- Location within Vladimir Oblast Location within Russia
- Coordinates: 55°21′N 41°51′E
- Country: Russia
- Region: Vladimir Oblast
- District: Melenkovsky District
- Time zone: UTC+3:00

Fursovo (Russian: Фурсово) is a rural locality (a village) in Lyakhovskoye Rural Settlement, Melenkovsky District, Vladimir Oblast, Russia. The population was 24 as of 2010. There are 2 streets.

== Geography ==
Fursovo is located on the Chernichka River, 18 km (11 mi) east of Melenki (the district's administrative centre) by road. Stepankovo is the nearest rural locality.
