= Golubyata =

Golubyata Голубята
- Selo
- Location within Perm Krai Location within Russia
- Coordinates: 58°28′N 56°59′E
- Country: Russia
- Region: Perm Krai
- District: Dobryansky District
- Time zone: UTC+5:00

Golubyata (Russian: Голубята) is a rural locality (a selo) in Dobryansky District, Perm Krai, Russia. The population was 153 as of 2010. There are 4 streets.

== Geography ==
Golubyata is located 54 km east of Dobryanka (the district's administrative centre) by road. Shkaryata is the nearest rural locality.
