= Yaganyata =

Yaganyata Яганята
- Village
- Location within Perm Krai Location within Russia
- Coordinates: 58°31′N 56°11′E
- Country: Russia
- Region: Perm Krai
- District: Dobryansky District
- Time zone: UTC+5:00

Yaganyata (Russian: Яганята) is a rural locality (a village) in Dobryansky District, Perm Krai, Russia. The population was 3 as of 2010. There is 1 street.

== Geography ==
Yaganyata is located 53 km northwest of Dobryanka (the district's administrative centre) by road. Gurino is the nearest rural locality.
