= Sinzhany =

Sinzhany Синжаны
- Selo
- Location within Vladimir Oblast Location within Russia
- Coordinates: 55°26′N 41°24′E
- Country: Russia
- Region: Vladimir Oblast
- District: Melenkovsky District
- Time zone: UTC+3:00

Sinzhany (Russian: Синжаны) is a rural locality (a selo) in Danilovskoye Rural Settlement, Melenkovsky District, Vladimir Oblast, Russia. The population was 276 as of 2010. There are 8 streets.

== Geography ==
Sinzhany is located 21 km northwest of Melenki (the district's administrative centre) by road. Sofronovo is the nearest rural locality.
