= Tolstikovo, Melenkovsky District, Vladimir Oblast =

Tolstikovo Толстиково
- Village
- Location within Vladimir Oblast Location within Russia
- Coordinates: 55°17′N 41°48′E
- Country: Russia
- Region: Vladimir Oblast
- District: Melenkovsky District
- Time zone: UTC+3:00

Tolstikovo (Russian: То́лстиково) is a rural locality (a village) in Lyakhovskoye Rural Settlement, Melenkovsky District, Vladimir Oblast, Russia. The population was 267 as of 2010. There are 4 streets.

== Geography ==
Tolstikovo is located 14 km southeast of Melenki (the district's administrative centre) by road. Bolshaya Sala is the nearest rural locality.
