= Vetlyany =

Vetlyany Ветляны
- Settlement
- Location within Perm Krai Location within Russia
- Coordinates: 58°16′N 56°45′E
- Country: Russia
- Region: Perm Krai
- District: Dobryansky District
- Time zone: UTC+5:00

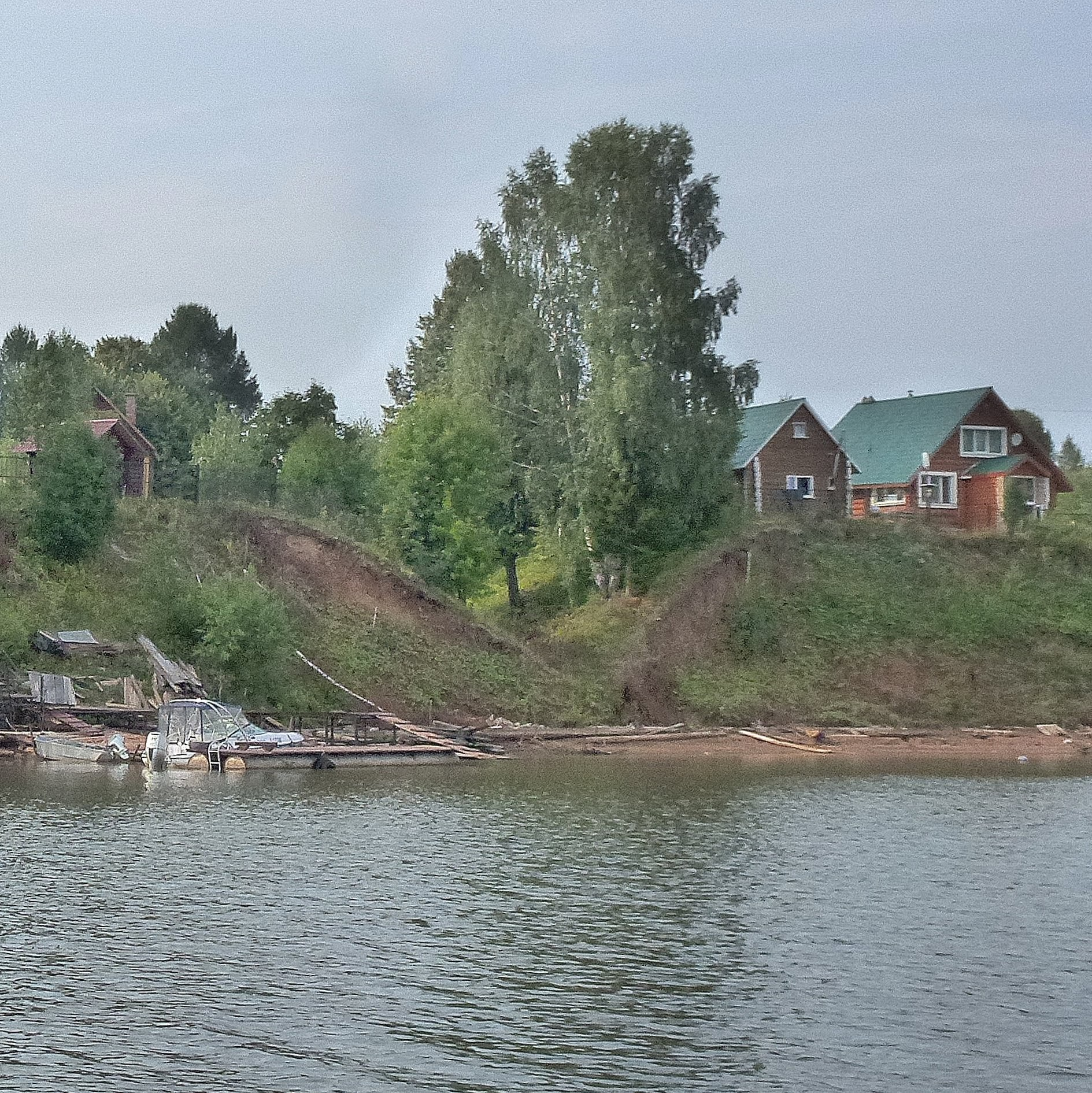
Vetlyany

Vetlyany (Russian: Ветляны) is a rural locality (a settlement) in Dobryansky District, Perm Krai, Russia. The population was 100 as of 2010. There are 15 streets.

== Geography ==
Vetlyany is located 48 km southeast of Dobryanka (the district's administrative centre) by road. Ust-Shalashnaya is the nearest rural locality.
