= Prosenitsy =

Prosenitsy Просеницы
- Village
- Location within Vladimir Oblast Location within Russia
- Coordinates: 55°32′N 41°48′E
- Country: Russia
- Region: Vladimir Oblast
- District: Melenkovsky District
- Time zone: UTC+3:00

Prosenitsy (Russian: Просеницы) is a rural locality (a village) in Denyatinskoye Rural Settlement, Melenkovsky District, Vladimir Oblast, Russia. The population was 36 as of 2010. There are 3 streets.

== Geography ==
Prosenitsy is located 32 km northeast of Melenki (the district's administrative centre) by road. Gribkovo is the nearest rural locality.
