= Nekhayka =

Nekhayka Нехайка
- Village
- Location within Perm Krai Location within Russia
- Coordinates: 58°48′N 56°45′E
- Country: Russia
- Region: Perm Krai
- District: Dobryansky District
- Time zone: UTC+5:00

Nekhayka (Russian: Нехайка) is a rural locality (a village) in Dobryansky District, Perm Krai, Russia. The population was 3 as of 2010.

== Geography ==
Nekhayka is located 64 km northeast of Dobryanka (the district's administrative centre) by road. Nikulino is the nearest rural locality.
