= Kulaki, Vladimir Oblast =

Kulaki Кулаки
- Village
- Location within Vladimir Oblast Location within Russia
- Coordinates: 55°12′N 41°38′E
- Country: Russia
- Region: Vladimir Oblast
- District: Melenkovsky District
- Time zone: UTC+3:00

Kulaki (Russian: Кулаки́) is a rural locality (a village) in Ilkinskoye Rural Settlement, Melenkovsky District, Vladimir Oblast, Russia. The population was 220 as of 2010. There are 3 streets.

== Geography ==
Kulaki is located on the Unzha River, 17 km south of Melenki (the district's administrative centre) by road. Kudrino is the nearest rural locality.
