= Pomortsevo =

Pomortsevo Поморцево
- Village
- Location within Perm Krai Location within Russia
- Coordinates: 58°52′N 56°38′E
- Country: Russia
- Region: Perm Krai
- District: Dobryansky District
- Time zone: UTC+5:00

Pomortsevo (Russian: Поморцево) is a rural locality (a village) in Dobryansky District, Perm Krai, Russia. The population was 21 as of 2010.

== Geography ==
Pomortsevo is located 67 km northeast of Dobryanka (the district's administrative centre) by road. Krutikovo is the nearest rural locality.
