= Arkhangel, Vladimir Oblast =

Arkhangel Архангел
- Selo
- Church of Michael the Archangel

- Location within Vladimir Oblast Location within Russia
- Coordinates: 55°27′N 41°32′E
- Country: Russia
- Region: Vladimir Oblast
- District: Melenkovsky District
- Time zone: UTC+3:00

Arkhangel (Russian: Арха́нгел) is a rural locality (a selo) in Butylitskoye Rural Settlement, Melenkovsky District, Vladimir Oblast, Russia. The population was 396 as of 2010. There are 5 streets.

== Geography ==
Arkhangel is located on the Unzha River, 16 km (9.9 mi) north of Melenki (the district's administrative centre) by road. Verkhounzha is the nearest rural locality.
