= Korikovo =

Korikovo Кориково
- Village
- Location within Vladimir Oblast Location within Russia
- Coordinates: 55°22′N 41°55′E
- Country: Russia
- Region: Vladimir Oblast
- District: Melenkovsky District
- Time zone: UTC+3:00

Korikovo (Russian: Кориково) is a rural locality (a village) in Lyakhovskoye Rural Settlement, Melenkovsky District, Vladimir Oblast, Russia. The population was 30 as of 2010. There are 2 streets.

== Geography ==
Korikovo is located on the Dubrovka River, 23 km (14 mi) east of Melenki (the district's administrative centre) by road. Vysokovo is the nearest rural locality.
