= Fominka =

Fominka Фоминка
- Village
- Location within Perm Krai Location within Russia
- Coordinates: 58°33′N 56°39′E
- Country: Russia
- Region: Perm Krai
- District: Dobryansky District
- Time zone: UTC+5:00

Fominka (Russian: Фоминка) is a rural locality (a village) in Dobryansky District, Perm Krai, Russia. The population was 41 as of 2010. There are 3 streets.

== Geography ==
Fominka is located 25 km northeast of Dobryanka (the district's administrative centre) by road. Kyzh is the nearest rural locality.
