= Lunezhki =

Lunezhki Лунежки
- Village
- Location within Perm Krai Location within Russia
- Coordinates: 58°21′N 56°28′E
- Country: Russia
- Region: Perm Krai
- District: Dobryansky District
- Time zone: UTC+5:00

Lunezhki (Russian: Лунежки) is a rural locality (a village) in Dobryansky District, Perm Krai, Russia. The population was 62 as of 2010. There are 2 streets.

== Geography ==
Lunezhki is located 20 km southeast of Dobryanka (the district's administrative centre) by road. Gory is the nearest rural locality.
