= Shkaryata =

Shkaryata Шкарята
- Village
- Location within Perm Krai Location within Russia
- Coordinates: 58°29′N 56°58′E
- Country: Russia
- Region: Perm Krai
- District: Dobryansky District
- Time zone: UTC+5:00

Shkaryata (Russian: Шкарята) is a rural locality (a village) in Dobryansky District, Perm Krai, Russia. The population was 14 as of 2010. There are nine houses and one street in the village. Postal code is 618736.

== Geography ==
Shkaryata is located on the Vilva river, 53 km east of Dobryanka (the district's administrative centre) by road. Golubyata is the nearest rural locality.
