= Ilkino, Melenkovsky District, Vladimir Oblast =

Ilkino Илькино
- Selo
- Location within Vladimir Oblast Location within Russia
- Coordinates: 55°13′N 41°36′E
- Country: Russia
- Region: Vladimir Oblast
- District: Melenkovsky District
- Time zone: UTC+3:00

Ilkino (Russian: И́лькино) is a rural locality (a selo) and the administrative center of Ilkinskoye Rural Settlement, Melenkovsky District, Vladimir Oblast, Russia. The population was 1,023 as of 2010. There are 8 streets.

== Geography ==
Ilkino is located on the Unzha River, 15 km (9.3 mi) south of Melenki (the district's administrative centre) by road. Osinki is the nearest rural locality.
