= Mutnaya =

Mutnaya (Russian: Мутная) is the name of several rural localities in Russia:

- Mutnaya (village), Dobryansky District, Perm Krai, a village in Dobryansky District, Perm Krai
- Mutnaya (settlement), Dobryansky District, Perm Krai, a settlement in Dobryansky District, Perm Krai
- Mutnaya (river), a tributary to Tsilma
