= Lekhtovo =

Lekhtovo Лехтово (Russian)
- Village
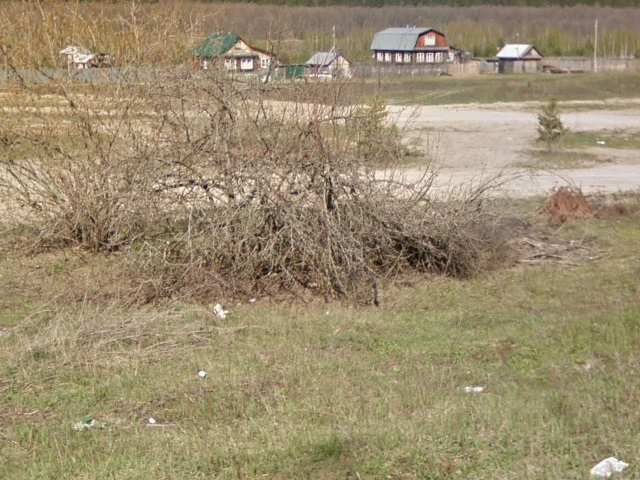
- Grass in the tree Lekhtovo

- Location within Vladimir Oblast Location within Russia
- Coordinates: 55°18′N 41°36′E
- Country: Russia
- Region: Vladimir Oblast
- District: Melenkovsky District
- Time zone: UTC+3:00

Lekhtovo (Russian: Лехтово) is a rural locality (a village) in Ilkinskoye Rural Settlement, Melenkovsky District, Vladimir Oblast, Russia. The population was 466 as of 2010. There are 3 streets.

== Geography ==
Lekhtovo is located on the Unzha River, 5 km south of Melenki (the district's administrative centre) by road. Melenki is the nearest rural locality.
