= Amosovo =

Amosovo Амосово
- Settlement
- Location within Vladimir Oblast Location within Russia
- Coordinates: 55°33′N 41°46′E
- Country: Russia
- Region: Vladimir Oblast
- District: Melenkovsky District
- Time zone: UTC+3:00

Amosovo (Russian: Амосово) is a rural locality (a settlement) in Denyatinskoye Rural Settlement, Melenkovsky District, Vladimir Oblast, Russia. The population was 8 as of 2010. There is 1 street.

== Geography ==
Amosovo is located 6 km (3.7 mi) north of Melenki (the district's administrative centre) by road. Ivatino is the nearest rural locality.
