= Yarino =

Yarino (Russian: Ярино) is the name of several rural localities in Russia:

- Yarino (settlement), Dobryanka, Perm Krai, a settlement in Dobryanka, Perm Krai
- Yarino (village), Dobryanka, Perm Krai, a village in Dobryanka, Perm Krai
