= Krutaya =

Krutaya Крутая
- Village
- Location within Vladimir Oblast Location within Russia
- Coordinates: 55°20′N 41°51′E
- Country: Russia
- Region: Vladimir Oblast
- District: Melenkovsky District
- Time zone: UTC+3:00

Krutaya (Russian: Крутая) is a rural locality (a village) in Lyakhovskoye Rural Settlement, Melenkovsky District, Vladimir Oblast, Russia. The population was 35 as of 2010.

== Geography ==
Krutaya is located 15 km east of Melenki (the district's administrative centre) by road. Fursovo is the nearest rural locality.
