= Omelichi =

Omelichi Омеличи
- Village
- Location within Perm Krai Location within Russia
- Coordinates: 58°50′N 56°47′E
- Country: Russia
- Region: Perm Krai
- District: Dobryansky District
- Time zone: UTC+5:00

Omelichi (Russian: Омеличи) is a rural locality (a village) in Dobryansky District, Perm Krai, Russia. The population was 9 as of 2010.

== Geography ==
Omelichi is located 60 km northeast of Dobryanka (the district's administrative centre) by road. Gryaznukha is the nearest rural locality.
