= Yelniki, Perm Krai =

Yelniki Ельники
- Village
- Location within Perm Krai Location within Russia
- Coordinates: 58°11′N 56°29′E
- Country: Russia
- Region: Perm Krai
- District: Dobryansky District
- Time zone: UTC+5:00

Yelniki (Russian: Ельники) is a rural locality (a village) in Dobryansky District, Perm Krai, Russia. The population was 4 as of 2010. There are 11 streets.

== Geography ==
Yelniki is located 47 km south of Dobryanka (the district's administrative centre) by road. Krasnaya Sludka is the nearest rural locality.
