= Milna, Vladimir Oblast =

Milna Мильна
- Village
- Location within Vladimir Oblast Location within Russia
- Coordinates: 55°09′N 41°35′E
- Country: Russia
- Region: Vladimir Oblast
- District: Melenkovsky District
- Time zone: UTC+3:00

Milna (Russian: Мильна) is a rural locality (a village) in Ilkinskoye Rural Settlement, Melenkovsky District, Vladimir Oblast, Russia. The population was 55 as of 2010. There are 2 streets.

== Geography ==
Milna is located 21 km south of Melenki (the district's administrative centre) by road. Kudrino is the nearest rural locality.
