= Novenkaya =

Novenkaya Новенькая
- Village
- Location within Vladimir Oblast Location within Russia
- Coordinates: 55°24′N 41°53′E
- Country: Russia
- Region: Vladimir Oblast
- District: Melenkovsky District
- Time zone: UTC+3:00

Novenkaya (Russian: Новенькая) is a rural locality (a village) in Turgenevskoye Rural Settlement, Melenkovsky District, Vladimir Oblast, Russia. The population was 3 as of 2010. There are 2 streets.

== Geography ==
Novenkaya is located 23 km northeast of Melenki (the district's administrative centre) by road. Ulanovka is the nearest rural locality.
