= Bolshoy Sanchur =

Bolshoy Sanchur Большой Санчур
- Village
- Location within Vladimir Oblast Location within Russia
- Coordinates: 55°10′N 41°45′E
- Country: Russia
- Region: Vladimir Oblast
- District: Melenkovsky District
- Time zone: UTC+3:00

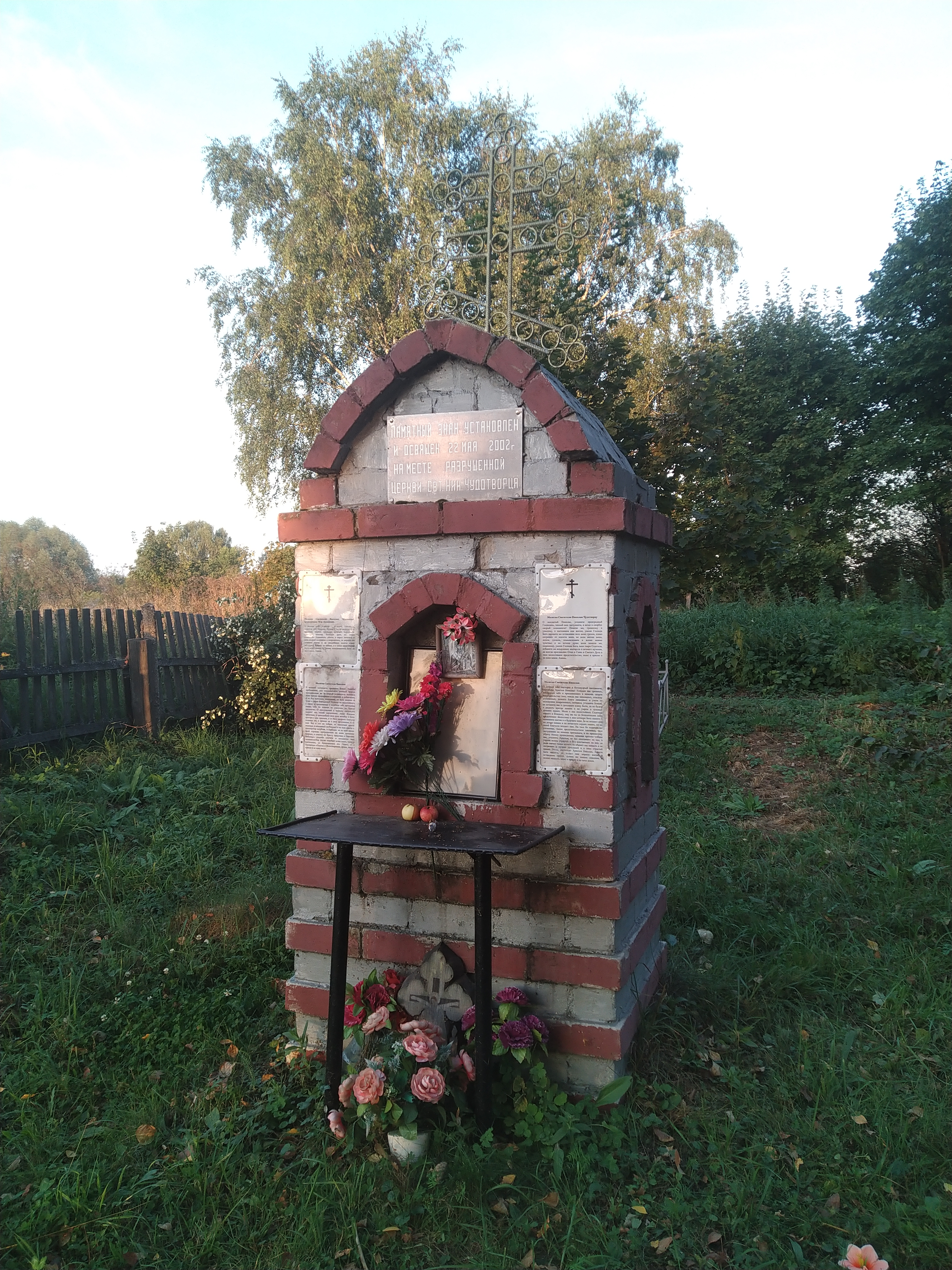
A sign in the village of Bolshoy Sanchur, Vladimir Oblast. Erected on May 22, 2002.

Bolshoy Sanchur (Russian: Большо́й Санчур) is a rural locality (a village) in Dmitriyevogorskoye Rural Settlement, Melenkovsky District, Vladimir Oblast, Russia. The population was 111 as of 2010.

== Geography ==
Bolshoy Sanchur is located 28 km (17 mi) southeast of Melenki (the district's administrative centre) by road. Maly Sanchur is the nearest rural locality.
