= Ust-Shalashnaya =

Ust-Shalashnaya Усть-Шалашная
- Settlement
- Location within Perm Krai Location within Russia
- Coordinates: 58°17′N 56°51′E
- Country: Russia
- Region: Perm Krai
- District: Dobryansky District
- Time zone: UTC+5:00

Ust-Shalashnaya (Russian: Усть-Шалашная) is a rural locality (a settlement) in Dobryansky District, Perm Krai, Russia. The population was 30 as of 2010. There are 9 streets.

== Geography ==
Ust-Shalashnaya is located 53 km southeast of Dobryanka (the district's administrative centre) by road. Shalashnaya is the nearest rural locality.
