= Dvoyezyory =

Dvoyezyory Двоезёры
- Village
- Location within Vladimir Oblast Location within Russia
- Coordinates: 55°12′N 41°22′E
- Country: Russia
- Region: Vladimir Oblast
- District: Melenkovsky District
- Time zone: UTC+3:00

Dvoyezyory (Russian: Двоезёры) is a rural locality (a village) in Ilkinskoye Rural Settlement, Melenkovsky District, Vladimir Oblast, Russia. The population was 30 as of 2010.

== Geography ==
Dvoyezyory is located 25 km (16 mi) southwest of Melenki (the district's administrative centre) by road. Ramen is the nearest rural locality.
