= Bolshoye Spitsino =

Bolshoye Spitsino Большое Спицыно
- Village
- Location within Perm Krai Location within Russia
- Coordinates: 58°28′N 57°02′E
- Country: Russia
- Region: Perm Krai
- District: Dobryansky District
- Time zone: UTC+5:00

Bolshoye Spitsino (Russian: Большое Спицыно) is a rural locality (a village) in Dobryansky District, Perm Krai, Russia. The population was 1 as of 2010. There are 2 streets.

== Geography ==
Bolshoye Spitsino is located 58 km east of Dobryanka (the district's administrative centre) by road. Golubyata is the nearest rural locality.
