= Selino, Vladimir Oblast =

Selino Селино
- Village
- Location within Vladimir Oblast Location within Russia
- Coordinates: 55°25′N 41°50′E
- Country: Russia
- Region: Vladimir Oblast
- District: Melenkovsky District
- Time zone: UTC+3:00

Selino (Russian: Селино) is a rural locality (a village) in Turgenevskoye Rural Settlement, Melenkovsky District, Vladimir Oblast, Russia. The population was 354 as of 2010. There are 4 streets.

== Geography ==
Selino is located 19 km northeast of Melenki (the district's administrative centre) by road. Turgenevo is the nearest rural locality.
