= Tulka (village) =

Tulka Тюлька
- Village
- Location within Perm Krai Location within Russia
- Coordinates: 58°30′N 56°08′E
- Country: Russia
- Region: Perm Krai
- District: Dobryansky District
- Time zone: UTC+5:00

Tulka (Russian: Тюлька) is a rural locality (a village) in Dobryansky District, Perm Krai, Russia. The population was 2 as of 2010. There is 1 street.

== Geography ==
Tulka is located 46 km west of Dobryanka (the district's administrative centre) by road. Besmelyata is the nearest rural locality.
