= Maly Sanchur =

Maly Sanchur Малый Санчур
- Village
- Location within Vladimir Oblast Location within Russia
- Coordinates: 55°10′N 41°45′E
- Country: Russia
- Region: Vladimir Oblast
- District: Melenkovsky District
- Time zone: UTC+3:00

Maly Sanchur (Russian: Малый Санчур) is a rural locality (a village) in Dmitriyevogorskoye Rural Settlement, Melenkovsky District, Vladimir Oblast, Russia. The population was 198 as of 2010.

== Geography ==
Maly Sanchur is located 32 km southeast of Melenki (the district's administrative centre) by road. Bolshoy Sanchur is the nearest rural locality.
