= Chyolva =

Chyolva Чёлва
- Settlement
- Location within Perm Krai Location within Russia
- Coordinates: 58°54′N 56°44′E
- Country: Russia
- Region: Perm Krai
- District: Dobryansky District
- Time zone: UTC+5:00

Chyolva (Russian: Чёлва) is a rural locality (a settlement) in Dobryansky District, Perm Krai, Russia. The population was 329 as of 2010. There are 10 streets.

== Geography ==
Chyolva is located 69 km northeast of Dobryanka (the district's administrative centre) by road. Omelichi is the nearest rural locality.
