= Shemeti =

Shemeti Шемети
- Selo
- Location within Perm Krai Location within Russia
- Coordinates: 58°21′N 56°14′E
- Country: Russia
- Region: Perm Krai
- District: Dobryansky District
- Time zone: UTC+5:00

Shemeti (Russian: Шемети) is a rural locality (a selo) in Dobryansky District, Perm Krai, Russia. The population was 99 as of 2010. There are 5 streets.

== Geography ==
Shemeti is located 23 km southwest of Dobryanka (the district's administrative centre) by road. Kamsky is the nearest rural locality.
