= Turgenevo, Vladimir Oblast =

Turgenevo Тургенево
- Village
- Location within Vladimir Oblast Location within Russia
- Coordinates: 55°26′N 41°52′E
- Country: Russia
- Region: Vladimir Oblast
- District: Melenkovsky District
- Time zone: UTC+3:00

Turgenevo (Russian: Турге́нево) is a rural locality (a village) and the administrative center of Turgenevskoye Rural Settlement, Melenkovsky District, Vladimir Oblast, Russia. The population was 1,150 as of 2010. There are 7 streets.

== Geography ==
Turgenevo is located on the Rayna River, 20 km northeast of Melenki (the district's administrative centre) by road. Selino is the nearest rural locality.
