= Nizhneye Krasnoye =

Nizhneye Krasnoye Нижнее Красное
- Village
- Location within Perm Krai Location within Russia
- Coordinates: 58°52′N 56°37′E
- Country: Russia
- Region: Perm Krai
- District: Dobryansky District
- Time zone: UTC+5:00

Nizhneye Krasnoye (Russian: Нижнее Красное) is a rural locality (a village) in Dobryansky District, Perm Krai, Russia. The population was 15 as of 2010. There are 4 streets.

== Geography ==
Nizhneye Krasnoye is located 70 km north of Dobryanka (the district's administrative centre) by road. Krasnoye is the nearest rural locality.
