= Levenda =

Levenda Левенда
- Village
- Location within Vladimir Oblast Location within Russia
- Coordinates: 55°18′N 41°47′E
- Country: Russia
- Region: Vladimir Oblast
- District: Melenkovsky District
- Time zone: UTC+3:00

Levenda (Russian: Левенда) is a rural locality (a village) in Lyakhovskoye Rural Settlement, Melenkovsky District, Vladimir Oblast, Russia. The population was 179 as of 2010. There are 3 streets.

== Geography ==
Levenda is located 12 km east of Melenki (the district's administrative centre) by road. Panovo is the nearest rural locality.
