= Ivatino =

Ivatino Иватино
- Village
- Location within Vladimir Oblast Location within Russia
- Coordinates: 55°22′N 41°35′E
- Country: Russia
- Region: Vladimir Oblast
- District: Melenkovsky District
- Time zone: UTC+3:00

Ivatino (Russian: Иватино) is a rural locality (a village) in Danilovskoye Rural Settlement, Melenkovsky District, Vladimir Oblast, Russia. The population was 582 as of 2010. There are 15 streets.

== Geography ==
Ivatino is located on the Unzha River, 6 km (3.7 mi) northwest of Melenki (the district's administrative centre) by road. Priklon is the nearest rural locality.
