= Pichugino =

Pichugino Пичугино
- Village
- Location within Vladimir Oblast Location within Russia
- Coordinates: 55°20′28″N 41°14′55″E
- Country: Russia
- Region: Vladimir Oblast
- District: Melenkovsky District
- Time zone: UTC+3:00

Pichugino (Russian: Пичугино) is a rural locality (a village) in Danilovskoye Rural Settlement, Melenkovsky District, Vladimir Oblast, Russia. The population was 75 as of 2010.

== Geography ==
Pichugino is located on the Charmus River, 33 km west of Melenki (the district's administrative centre) by road. Kamenka is the nearest rural locality.
