= Mokhovo =

Mokhovo Мохово
- Village
- Location within Perm Krai Location within Russia
- Coordinates: 58°19′N 56°21′E
- Country: Russia
- Region: Perm Krai
- District: Dobryansky District
- Time zone: UTC+5:00

Mokhovo (Russian: Мохово) is a rural locality (a village) in Dobryansky District, Perm Krai, Russia. The population was 61 as of 2010. There are 26 streets.

== Geography ==
Mokhovo is located 41 km south of Dobryanka (the district's administrative centre) by road. Zaborye is the nearest rural locality.
