= Sovetsky, Vladimir Oblast =

Sovetsky Советский
- Settlement
- Location within Vladimir Oblast Location within Russia
- Coordinates: 55°31′N 41°24′E
- Country: Russia
- Region: Vladimir Oblast
- District: Melenkovsky District
- Time zone: UTC+3:00

Sovetsky (Russian: Советский) is a rural locality (a settlement) in Butylitskoye Rural Settlement, Melenkovsky District, Vladimir Oblast, Russia. The population was 71 as of 2010. There are 3 streets.

== Geography ==
Sovetsky is located 31 km northwest of Melenki (the district's administrative centre) by road. Dobryatino is the nearest rural locality.
