= Priklon =

Priklon Приклон
- Selo
- Location within Vladimir Oblast Location within Russia
- Coordinates: 55°21′N 41°35′E
- Country: Russia
- Region: Vladimir Oblast
- District: Melenkovsky District
- Time zone: UTC+3:00

Priklon (Russian: Приклон) is a rural locality (a selo) in Danilovskoye Rural Settlement, Melenkovsky District, Vladimir Oblast, Russia. The population was 445 as of 2010. There are 6 streets.

== Geography ==
Priklon is located on the Unzha River, 4 km northwest of Melenki (the district's administrative centre) by road. Melenki is the nearest rural locality.
