= Maximovo, Vladimir Oblast =

Maximovo Максимово
- Village
- Location within Vladimir Oblast Location within Russia
- Coordinates: 55°29′N 41°24′E
- Country: Russia
- Region: Vladimir Oblast
- District: Melenkovsky District
- Time zone: UTC+3:00

Maximovo (Russian: Макси́мово) is a rural locality (a village) in Butylitskoye Rural Settlement, Melenkovsky District, Vladimir Oblast, Russia. The population was 317 as of 2010. There are 7 streets.

== Geography ==
Maximovo is located 29 km northwest of Melenki (the district's administrative centre) by road. Dobryatino is the nearest rural locality.
