= Gorodishchi, Melenkovsky District, Vladimir Oblast =

Gorodishchi Городищи
- Village
- Location within Vladimir Oblast Location within Russia
- Coordinates: 55°30′N 41°49′E
- Country: Russia
- Region: Vladimir Oblast
- District: Melenkovsky District
- Time zone: UTC+3:00

Gorodishchi (Russian: Городищи) is a rural locality (a village) in Denyatinskoye Rural Settlement, Melenkovsky District, Vladimir Oblast, Russia. The population was 18 as of 2010. There are 3 streets.

== Geography ==
Gorodishchi is located on the Zhernovka River, 36 km (22 mi) northeast of Melenki (the district's administrative centre) by road. Prosenitsy is the nearest rural locality.
