= Papulino =

Papulino Папулино
- Selo
- Location within Vladimir Oblast Location within Russia
- Coordinates: 55°33′N 41°45′E
- Country: Russia
- Region: Vladimir Oblast
- District: Melenkovsky District
- Time zone: UTC+3:00

Papulino (Russian: Папу́лино) is a rural locality (a selo) in Denyatinskoye Rural Settlement, Melenkovsky District, Vladimir Oblast, Russia. The population was 651 as of 2010. There are 6 streets.

== Geography ==
Papulino is located 29 km north of Melenki (the district's administrative centre) by road. Rozhdestveno is the nearest rural locality.
