= Danilovo, Vladimir Oblast =

Danilovo Данилово
- Village
- Location within Vladimir Oblast Location within Russia
- Coordinates: 55°24′N 41°24′E
- Country: Russia
- Region: Vladimir Oblast
- District: Melenkovsky District
- Time zone: UTC+3:00

Danilovo (Russian: Дани́лово) is a rural locality (a village) and the administrative center of Danilovskoye Rural Settlement, Melenkovsky District, Vladimir Oblast, Russia. The population was 55 as of 2010. There are 2 streets.

== Geography ==
Danilovo is located 19 km (12 mi) northwest of Melenki (the district's administrative centre) by road. Sofronovo is the nearest rural locality.
