= Rozhdestveno, Melenkovsky District, Vladimir Oblast =

Rozhdestveno Рождествено
- Village
- Location within Vladimir Oblast Location within Russia
- Coordinates: 55°33′N 41°44′E
- Country: Russia
- Region: Vladimir Oblast
- District: Melenkovsky District
- Time zone: UTC+3:00

Rozhdestveno (Russian: Рождествено) is a rural locality (a village) in Denyatinskoye Rural Settlement, Melenkovsky District, Vladimir Oblast, Russia. The population was 131 as of 2010.

== Geography ==
Rozhdestveno is located 27 km north of Melenki (the district's administrative centre) by road. Papulino is the nearest rural locality.
