= Usad, Vladimir Oblast =

Usad Усад
- Village
- Location within Vladimir Oblast Location within Russia
- Coordinates: 55°25′N 42°00′E
- Country: Russia
- Region: Vladimir Oblast
- District: Melenkovsky District
- Time zone: UTC+3:00

Usad (Russian: Усáд) is a rural locality (a village) in Lyakhovskoye Rural Settlement, Melenkovsky District, Vladimir Oblast, Russia. The population was 207 as of 2010. There are 6 streets.

== Geography ==
Usad is located 33 km northeast of Melenki (the district's administrative centre) by road. Urvanovo is the nearest rural locality.
