= Patraki =

Patraki Патраки
- Village
- Location within Perm Krai Location within Russia
- Coordinates: 58°27′N 56°11′E
- Country: Russia
- Region: Perm Krai
- District: Dobryansky District
- Time zone: UTC+5:00

Patraki (Russian: Патраки) is a rural locality (a village) in Dobryansky District, Perm Krai, Russia. The population was 71 as of 2010. There is 1 street.

== Geography ==
Patraki is located 37 km west of Dobryanka (the district's administrative centre) by road. Senkino is the nearest rural locality.
