= Timoshino =

Timoshino Тимошино
- Village
- Location within Vladimir Oblast Location within Russia
- Coordinates: 55°22′N 41°24′E
- Country: Russia
- Region: Vladimir Oblast
- District: Melenkovsky District
- Time zone: UTC+3:00

Timoshino (Russian: Тимошино) is a rural locality (a village) in Danilovskoye Rural Settlement, Melenkovsky District, Vladimir Oblast, Russia. The population was 135 as of 2010. There are 2 streets.

== Geography ==
Timoshino is located 23 km northwest of Melenki (the district's administrative centre) by road. Mildevo is the nearest rural locality.
