= Korolevo, Perm Krai =

Korolevo Королево
- Village
- Location within Perm Krai Location within Russia
- Coordinates: 58°32′N 56°14′E
- Country: Russia
- Region: Perm Krai
- District: Dobryansky District
- Time zone: UTC+5:00

Korolevo (Russian: Королево) is a rural locality (a village) in Dobryansky District, Perm Krai, Russia. The population was 5 as of 2010.

== Geography ==
Korolevo is located 22 km northeast of Dobryanka (the district's administrative centre) by road. Bolshoye Zapolye is the nearest rural locality.
