= Batashata =

Batashata Баташата
- Village
- Location within Perm Krai Location within Russia
- Coordinates: 58°44′N 57°03′E
- Country: Russia
- Region: Perm Krai
- District: Dobryansky District
- Time zone: UTC+5:00

Batashata (Russian: Баташата) is a rural locality (a village) in Dobryansky District, Perm Krai, Russia. The population was 1 as of 2010.

== Geography ==
Batashata is located 76 km northeast of Dobryanka (the district's administrative centre) by road. Yaroslavshchina is the nearest rural locality.
