= Nizhny Lukh =

Nizhny Lukh Нижний Лух
- Settlement
- Location within Perm Krai Location within Russia
- Coordinates: 58°45′N 56°20′E
- Country: Russia
- Region: Perm Krai
- District: Dobryansky District
- Time zone: UTC+5:00

Nizhny Lukh (Russian: Нижний Лух) is a rural locality (a settlement) in Dobryansky District, Perm Krai, Russia. The population was 464 as of 2010. There are 6 streets.

== Geography ==
Nizhny Lukh is located 51 km north of Dobryanka (the district's administrative centre) by road. Olkhovka is the nearest rural locality.
