= Yarino (settlement), Dobryanka, Perm Krai =

Yarino Ярино
- Settlement
- Location within Perm Krai Location within Russia
- Coordinates: 58°26′N 56°41′E
- Country: Russia
- Region: Perm Krai
- District: Dobryansky District
- Time zone: UTC+5:00

Yarino (Russian: Ярино) is a rural locality (a settlement) in Dobryansky District, Perm Krai, Russia. The population was 432 as of 2010. There are 20 streets.

== Geography ==
Yarino is located 21 km east of Dobryanka (the district's administrative centre) by road. Traktovy is the nearest rural locality.
