= Shokhino =

Shokhino Шохино
- Village
- Location within Vladimir Oblast Location within Russia
- Coordinates: 55°26′N 42°03′E
- Country: Russia
- Region: Vladimir Oblast
- District: Melenkovsky District
- Time zone: UTC+3:00

Shokhino (Russian: Шохино) is a rural locality (a village) in Lyakhovskoye Rural Settlement, Melenkovsky District, Vladimir Oblast, Russia. The population was 29 in 2010, and went down to a population of 16 people in 2021, according to the census. There are two streets.

== Geography ==
Shokhino is located on the Urvanovskoye Lake, 40 km northeast of Melenki (the district's administrative centre) by road. Urvanovo is the nearest rural locality. History

== Economy and infrastructure ==
Shokhino has a small, agriculture-based economy with limited infrastructure. Residents primarily engage in subsistence farming, fishing, and seasonal work in nearby towns. The village is connected to nearby localities via unpaved rural roads.

== Culture and daily life ==
Life in Shokhino reflects traditional Russian village culture. The population is predominantly elderly, and community life is centered around seasonal activities, Orthodox Christian holidays, and simple rural living. Due to its small population, Shokhino does not have public facilities such as a school or medical clinic; residents rely on nearby settlements for such services.

== Time zone ==
Shokhino operates on Moscow Standard Time (UTC+3:00).
