= Krutikovo =

Krutikovo Крутиково
- Village
- Location within Perm Krai Location within Russia
- Coordinates: 58°52′N 56°38′E
- Country: Russia
- Region: Perm Krai
- District: Dobryansky District
- Time zone: UTC+5:00

Krutikovo (Russian: Крутиково) is a rural locality (a village) in Dobryansky District, Perm Krai, Russia. The population was 13 as of 2010.

== Geography ==
Krutikovo is located 67 km north of Dobryanka (the district's administrative centre) by road. Nizhneye Krasnoye is the nearest rural locality.
