= Sokolye =

Sokolye Соколье
- Settlement
- Location within Vladimir Oblast Location within Russia
- Coordinates: 55°16′N 41°29′E
- Country: Russia
- Region: Vladimir Oblast
- District: Melenkovsky District
- Time zone: UTC+3:00

Sokolye (Russian: Соколье) is a rural locality (a settlement) in Danilovskoye Rural Settlement, Melenkovsky District, Vladimir Oblast, Russia. The population was 140 as of 2010. There are 3 streets.

== Geography ==
Sokolye is located 14 km southwest of Melenki (the district's administrative centre) by road. Melenki is the nearest rural locality.
