= Skripino =

Skripino Скрипино
- Village
- Location within Vladimir Oblast Location within Russia
- Coordinates: 55°36′N 41°29′E
- Country: Russia
- Region: Vladimir Oblast
- District: Melenkovsky District
- Time zone: UTC+3:00

Skripino (Russian: Скрипино) is a rural locality (a village) in Butylitskoye Rural Settlement, Melenkovsky District, Vladimir Oblast, Russia. The population was 178 as of 2010. There are 6 streets.

== Geography ==
Skripino is located 34 km north of Melenki (the district's administrative centre) by road. Gorokhovo is the nearest rural locality.
