= Bor-Lyonva =

Bor-Lyonva Бор-Лёнва
- Settlement
- Location within Perm Krai Location within Russia
- Coordinates: 58°36′N 56°06′E
- Country: Russia
- Region: Perm Krai
- District: Dobryansky District
- Time zone: UTC+5:00

Bor-Lyonva (Russian: Бор-Лёнва) is a rural locality (a settlement) in Dobryansky District, Perm Krai, Russia. The population was 252 as of 2010. There are 18 streets.

== Geography ==
Bor-Lyonva is located 32 km northwest of Dobryanka (the district's administrative centre) by road. Bolshoye Zapolye is the nearest rural locality.
