= Savkovo =

Savkovo Савково
- Village
- Location within Vladimir Oblast Location within Russia
- Coordinates: 55°23′N 41°49′E
- Country: Russia
- Region: Vladimir Oblast
- District: Melenkovsky District
- Time zone: UTC+3:00

Savkovo (Russian: Савково) is a rural locality (a village) in Turgenevskoye Rural Settlement, Melenkovsky District, Vladimir Oblast, Russia. The population was 179 as of 2010. There are 3 streets.

== Geography ==
Savkovo is located 15 km northeast of Melenki (the district's administrative centre) by road. Selino is the nearest rural locality.
