= Vysokovo, Melenkovsky District, Vladimir Oblast =

Vysokovo Высоково
- Village
- Location within Vladimir Oblast Location within Russia
- Coordinates: 55°21′N 41°55′E
- Country: Russia
- Region: Vladimir Oblast
- District: Melenkovsky District
- Time zone: UTC+3:00

Vysokovo (Russian: Высо́ково) is a rural locality (a village) in Lyakhovskoye Rural Settlement, Melenkovsky District, Vladimir Oblast, Russia. The population as of 2010, was 294. The rural locality has 4 known streets.

== Geography ==
Vysokovo is located 22 km east of Melenki (the district's administrative centre) by road. The nearest rural locality is Korikovo.
