= Zlobino, Melenkovsky District, Vladimir Oblast =

Zlobino Злобино
- Village
- Location within Vladimir Oblast Location within Russia
- Coordinates: 55°24′N 41°33′E
- Country: Russia
- Region: Vladimir Oblast
- District: Melenkovsky District
- Time zone: UTC+3:00

Zlobino (Russian: Зло́бино) is a rural locality (a village) in Butylitskoye Rural Settlement, Melenkovsky District, Vladimir Oblast, Russia. The population was 635 as of 2010. There are 2 streets.

== Geography ==
Zlobino is located on the Unzha River, 11 km north of Melenki (the district's administrative centre) by road. Arkhangel is the nearest rural locality.
