= Dvoynovo =

Dvoynovo Двойново
- Village
- Location within Vladimir Oblast Location within Russia
- Coordinates: 55°11′N 41°31′E
- Country: Russia
- Region: Vladimir Oblast
- District: Melenkovsky District
- Time zone: UTC+3:00

Dvoynovo (Russian: Двойново) is a rural locality (a village) in Ilkinskoye Rural Settlement, Melenkovsky District, Vladimir Oblast, Russia. The population was 256 as of 2010. There are 5 streets.

== Geography ==
Dvoynovo is located 20 km (12 mi) south of Melenki (the district's administrative centre) by road. Ilkino is the nearest rural locality.
