= Okshovo =

Okshovo Окшово
- Village
- Location within Vladimir Oblast Location within Russia
- Coordinates: 55°08′N 41°42′E
- Country: Russia
- Region: Vladimir Oblast
- District: Melenkovsky District
- Time zone: UTC+3:00

Okshovo (Russian: Окшово) is a rural locality (a village) in Dmitriyevogorskoye Rural Settlement, Melenkovsky District, Vladimir Oblast, Russia. The population was 94 as of 2010.

== Geography ==
Okshovo is located 26 km southeast of Melenki (the district's administrative centre) by road. Muratovo is the nearest rural locality.
