= Kochetki (settlement) =

Kochetki Кочетки
- Settlement
- Location within Vladimir Oblast Location within Russia
- Coordinates: 55°12′N 41°42′E
- Country: Russia
- Region: Vladimir Oblast
- District: Melenkovsky District
- Time zone: UTC+3:00

Kochetki (Russian: Кочетки) is a rural locality (a settlement) in Ilkinskoye Rural Settlement, Melenkovsky District, Vladimir Oblast, Russia. The population was 1 as of 2010. There is 1 street.

== Geography ==
Kochetki is located 49 km (30 mi) southwest of Melenki (the district's administrative centre) by road. Dmitriyevo is the nearest rural locality.
