= Maly Priklon =

Maly Priklon Малый Приклон
- Village
- Location within Vladimir Oblast Location within Russia
- Coordinates: 55°19′N 41°34′E
- Country: Russia
- Region: Vladimir Oblast
- District: Melenkovsky District
- Time zone: UTC+3:00

Maly Priklon (Russian: Малый Приклон) is a rural locality (a village) in Danilovskoye Rural Settlement, Melenkovsky District, Vladimir Oblast, Russia. The population was 203 as of 2010.

== Geography ==
Maly Priklon is located 4 km west of Melenki (the district's administrative centre) by road. Melenki is the nearest rural locality.
