= Denyatino =

Denyatino Денятино
- Selo
- Location within Vladimir Oblast Location within Russia
- Coordinates: 55°30′N 41°40′E
- Country: Russia
- Region: Vladimir Oblast
- District: Melenkovsky District
- Time zone: UTC+3:00

Denyatino (Russian: Деня́тино) is a rural locality (a selo) and the administrative center of Denyatinskoye Rural Settlement, Melenkovsky District, Vladimir Oblast, Russia. The population was 643 as of 2010. There are 7 streets.

== Geography ==
Denyatino is located 20 km (12 mi) north of Melenki (the district's administrative centre) by road. Aleksandrino is the nearest rural locality.
