= Berdnikovshchina =

Berdnikovshchina Бердниковщина
- Village
- Location within Perm Krai Location within Russia
- Coordinates: 58°43′N 56°53′E
- Country: Russia
- Region: Perm Krai
- District: Dobryansky District
- Time zone: UTC+5:00

Berdnikovshchina (Russian: Бердниковщина) is a rural locality (a village) in Dobryansky District, Perm Krai, Russia. The population was 3 as of 2010.

== Geography ==
Berdnikovshchina is located 55 km northeast of Dobryanka (the district's administrative centre) by road. Monastyr is the nearest rural locality.
