= Lyakhi =

Lyakhi Ляхи
- Selo
- Location within Vladimir Oblast Location within Russia
- Coordinates: 55°19′N 41°55′E
- Country: Russia
- Region: Vladimir Oblast
- District: Melenkovsky District
- Time zone: UTC+3:00

Lyakhi (Russian: Ля́хи) is a rural locality (a selo) and the administrative center of Lyakhovskoye Rural Settlement, Melenkovsky District, Vladimir Oblast, Russia. The population was 1,448 as of 2010. There are 17 streets.

== Geography ==
Lyakhi is located on the Oka River, 20 km east of Melenki (the district's administrative centre) by road. Chernichenka is the nearest rural locality.
