= Alexandrino =

Alexandrino Александрино
- Village
- Location within Vladimir Oblast Location within Russia
- Coordinates: 55°31′N 41°38′E
- Country: Russia
- Region: Vladimir Oblast
- District: Melenkovsky District
- Time zone: UTC+3:00

Alexandrino (Russian: Александрино) is a rural locality (a village) in Denyatinskoye Rural Settlement, Melenkovsky District, Vladimir Oblast, Russia. The population was 62 as of 2010.

== Geography ==
Alexandrino is located 23 km (14 mi) north of Melenki (the district's administrative centre) by road. Levino is the nearest rural locality.
