= Chernichenka =

Chernichenka Черниченка
- Village
- Location within Vladimir Oblast Location within Russia
- Coordinates: 55°20′N 41°54′E
- Country: Russia
- Region: Vladimir Oblast
- District: Melenkovsky District
- Time zone: UTC+3:00

Chernichenka (Russian: Черниченка) is a rural locality (a village) in Lyakhovskoye Rural Settlement, Melenkovsky District, Vladimir Oblast, Russia. The population was 128 as of 2010. There are 2 streets.

== Geography ==
Chernichenka is located on the Chernichka River, 21 km (13 mi) east of Melenki (the district's administrative centre) by road. Lyakhi is the nearest rural locality.
