= Dubtsy =

Dubtsy Дубцы
- Village
- Location within Vladimir Oblast Location within Russia
- Coordinates: 55°21′N 41°48′E
- Country: Russia
- Region: Vladimir Oblast
- District: Melenkovsky District
- Time zone: UTC+3:00

Dubtsy (Russian: Дубцы) is a rural locality (a village) in Lyakhovskoye Rural Settlement, Melenkovsky District, Vladimir Oblast, Russia. The population was 16 as of 2010. There are 2 streets.

== Geography ==
Dubtsy is located 14 km (8.7 mi) east of Melenki (the district's administrative centre) by road. Panovo is the nearest rural locality.
