= Muratovo =

Muratovo Муратово
- Village
- Location within Vladimir Oblast Location within Russia
- Coordinates: 55°09′N 41°43′E
- Country: Russia
- Region: Vladimir Oblast
- District: Melenkovsky District
- Time zone: UTC+3:00

Muratovo (Russian: Муратово) is a rural locality (a village) in the Dmitriyevogorskoye Rural Settlement, Melenkovsky District, Vladimir Oblast, Russia. The population was 14 as of 2010.

== Geography ==
Muratovo is located 28 km southeast of Melenki (the district's administrative centre) by road. Okshovo is the nearest rural locality.
