= Rogovik =

Rogovik Роговик
- Village
- Location within Perm Krai Location within Russia
- Coordinates: 58°33′N 56°18′E
- Country: Russia
- Region: Perm Krai
- District: Dobryansky District
- Time zone: UTC+5:00

Rogovik (Russian: Роговик) is a rural locality (a village) in Dobryansky District, Perm Krai, Russia. The population was 6 as of 2010.

== Geography ==
Rogovik is located 19 km northwest of Dobryanka (the district's administrative centre) by road. Lipovo is the nearest rural locality.
