= Voyutino =

Voyutino Воютино
- Selo
- Location within Vladimir Oblast Location within Russia
- Coordinates: 55°15′N 41°49′E
- Country: Russia
- Region: Vladimir Oblast
- District: Melenkovsky District
- Time zone: UTC+3:00

Voyutino (Russian: Вою́тино) is a rural locality (a selo) in Dmitriyevogorskoye Rural Settlement, Melenkovsky District, Vladimir Oblast, Russia. The population was 374 as of 2010. There are 6 streets.

== Geography ==
Voyutino is located on the Oka River, 25 km southeast of Melenki (the district's administrative centre) by road. Kononovo is the nearest rural locality.
