= Derevnishchi =

Derevnishchi Деревнищи
- Village
- Location within Vladimir Oblast Location within Russia
- Coordinates: 55°22′N 41°50′E
- Country: Russia
- Region: Vladimir Oblast
- District: Melenkovsky District
- Time zone: UTC+3:00

Derevnishchi (Russian: Деревнищи) is a rural locality (a village) in Lyakhovskoye Rural Settlement, Melenkovsky District, Vladimir Oblast, Russia. The population was 41 as of 2010.

== Geography ==
Derevnishchi is located 16 km (9.9 mi) northeast of Melenki (the district's administrative centre) by road. Savkovo is the nearest rural locality.
