= Osinki, Melenkovsky District, Vladimir Oblast =

Osinki Осинки
- Village
- Location within Vladimir Oblast Location within Russia
- Coordinates: 55°14′N 41°37′E
- Country: Russia
- Region: Vladimir Oblast
- District: Melenkovsky District
- Time zone: UTC+3:00

Osinki (Russian: Осинки) is a rural locality (a village) in Ilkinskoye Rural Settlement, Melenkovsky District, Vladimir Oblast, Russia. The population was 271 as of 2010. There are 3 streets.

== Geography ==
Osinki is located on the Unzha River, 13 km south of Melenki (the district's administrative centre) by road. Ilkino is the nearest rural locality.
