= Yaroslavshchina =

Yaroslavshchina Ярославщина
- Village
- Location within Perm Krai Location within Russia
- Coordinates: 58°43′N 56°50′E
- Country: Russia
- Region: Perm Krai
- District: Dobryansky District
- Time zone: UTC+5:00

Yaroslavshchina (Russian: Ярославщина) is a rural locality (a village) in Dobryansky District, Perm Krai, Russia. The population was 10 as of 2010.

== Geography ==
Yaroslavshchina is located 51 km northeast of Dobryanka (the district's administrative centre) by road. Sofronyata is the nearest rural locality.
