= Dobryatino, Melenkovsky District, Vladimir Oblast =

Dobryatino Добрятино
- Village
- Location within Vladimir Oblast Location within Russia
- Coordinates: 55°30′N 41°24′E
- Country: Russia
- Region: Vladimir Oblast
- District: Melenkovsky District
- Time zone: UTC+3:00

Dobryatino (Russian: Добря́тино) is a rural locality (a village) in Butylitskoye Rural Settlement, Melenkovsky District, Vladimir Oblast, Russia. The population was 28 as of 2010.

== Geography ==
Dobryatino is located 29 km (18 mi) northwest of Melenki (the district's administrative centre) by road. Kuzmino is the nearest rural locality.
