= Kesovo =

Kesovo Кесово
- Village
- Location within Vladimir Oblast Location within Russia
- Coordinates: 55°28′N 41°53′E
- Country: Russia
- Region: Vladimir Oblast
- District: Melenkovsky District
- Time zone: UTC+3:00

Kesovo (Russian: Кесово) is a rural locality (a village) that is located in the Turgenevskoye Rural Settlement, Melenkovsky District, Vladimir Oblast, Russia. The population was 35 as of 2010.

== Geography ==
Kesovo is located 25 km (16 mi) northeast of Melenki (the district's administrative centre) by road. Maksimovka is the nearest rural locality.
