= Verkhozerye =

Verkhozerye Верхозерье
- Selo
- Location within Vladimir Oblast Location within Russia
- Coordinates: 55°24′N 41°58′E
- Country: Russia
- Region: Vladimir Oblast
- District: Melenkovsky District
- Time zone: UTC+3:00

Verkhozerye (Russian: Верхозерье) is a rural locality (a selo) in Lyakhovskoye Rural Settlement, Melenkovsky District, Vladimir Oblast, Russia. The population was 39 as of 2010. There are 6 streets.

== Geography ==
Verkhozerye is located on the Urvanovskoye Lake, 30 km southeast of Melenki (the district's administrative centre) by road. Starinki is the nearest rural locality.
