= Kholkovo =

Kholkovo Хольково
- Village
- Location within Vladimir Oblast Location within Russia
- Coordinates: 55°30′N 41°46′E
- Country: Russia
- Region: Vladimir Oblast
- District: Melenkovsky District
- Time zone: UTC+3:00

Kholkovo (Russian: Хольково) is a rural locality (a village) in Denyatinskoye Rural Settlement, Melenkovsky District, Vladimir Oblast, Russia. The population was 5 as of 2010. There are 2 streets.

== Geography ==
Kholkovo is located 41 km (25 mi) northeast of Melenki (the district's administrative centre) by road. Gorodishchi is the nearest rural locality.
