= Nizhneye Zadolgoye =

Nizhneye Zadolgoye Нижнее Задолгое
- Village
- Location within Perm Krai Location within Russia
- Coordinates: 58°18′N 56°27′E
- Country: Russia
- Region: Perm Krai
- District: Dobryansky District
- Time zone: UTC+5:00

Nizhneye Zadolgoye (Russian: Нижнее Задолгое) is a rural locality (a village) in Dobryansky District, Perm Krai, Russia. The population was 147 as of 2010. There are 12 streets.

== Geography ==
Nizhneye Zadolgoye is located 31 km south of Dobryanka (the district's administrative centre) by road. Kumorova Zavod is the nearest rural locality.
