= Sofronyata =

Sofronyata Софронята
- Village
- Location within Perm Krai Location within Russia
- Coordinates: 58°42′N 56°51′E
- Country: Russia
- Region: Perm Krai
- District: Dobryansky District
- Time zone: UTC+5:00

Sofronyata (Russian: Софронята) is a rural locality (a village) in Dobryansky District, Perm Krai, Russia. The population was 1 as of 2010.

== Geography ==
Sofronyata is located 52 km northeast of Dobryanka (the district's administrative centre) by road. Ust-Pozhva is the nearest rural locality.
