= Vologdino =

Vologdino Вологдино
- Village
- Location within Vladimir Oblast Location within Russia
- Coordinates: 55°28′N 41°55′E
- Country: Russia
- Region: Vladimir Oblast
- District: Melenkovsky District
- Time zone: UTC+3:00

Vologdino (Russian: Вологдино) is a rural locality (a village) in Turgenevskoye Rural Settlement, Melenkovsky District, Vladimir Oblast, Russia. The population was 2 as of 2010.

== Geography ==
Vologdino is located 29 km northeast of Melenki (the district's administrative centre) by road. Maksimovka is the nearest rural locality.
