= Levino =

Levino Левино
- Village
- Location within Vladimir Oblast Location within Russia
- Coordinates: 55°31′N 41°37′E
- Country: Russia
- Region: Vladimir Oblast
- District: Melenkovsky District
- Time zone: UTC+3:00

Levino (Russian: Левино) is a rural locality (a village) in Denyatinskoye Rural Settlement, Melenkovsky District, Vladimir Oblast, Russia. The population is 367 as of 2010. There are 4 streets.

== Geography ==
Levino is located 24 km north of Melenki (the district's administrative centre) by road. Aleksandrino is the nearest rural locality.
