= Zimnitsy =

Zimnitsy Зимницы
- Village
- Location within Vladimir Oblast Location within Russia
- Coordinates: 55°32′N 41°33′E
- Country: Russia
- Region: Vladimir Oblast
- District: Melenkovsky District
- Time zone: UTC+3:00

Zimnitsy (Russian: Зимницы) is a rural locality (a village) in Butylitskoye Rural Settlement, Melenkovsky District, Vladimir Oblast, Russia. The population was 3 as of 2010.

== Geography ==
Zimnitsy is located 30 km north of Melenki (the district's administrative centre) by road. Babukhovo is the nearest rural locality.
