= Ulanovka =

Ulanovka Улановка
- Village
- Location within Vladimir Oblast Location within Russia
- Coordinates: 55°23′N 41°54′E
- Country: Russia
- Region: Vladimir Oblast
- District: Melenkovsky District
- Time zone: UTC+3:00

Ulanovka (Russian: Улановка) is a rural locality (a village) in Turgenevskoye Rural Settlement, Melenkovsky District, Vladimir Oblast, Russia. The population was 4 as of 2010. There are 2 streets.

== Geography ==
Ulanovka is located 25 km northeast of Melenki (the district's administrative centre) by road. Novenkaya is the nearest rural locality.
