= Lyabovo =

Lyabovo Лябово
- Village
- Location within Perm Krai Location within Russia
- Coordinates: 58°26′16″N 56°22′07″E
- Country: Russia
- Region: Perm Krai
- District: Dobryansky District
- Time zone: UTC+5:00

Lyabovo (Russian: Лябово) is a rural locality (a village) in Dobryansky District, Perm Krai, Russia. The population was 32 as of 2010. There are 9 streets.

== Geography ==
Lyabovo is located 5 km southwest of Dobryanka (the district's administrative centre) by road. Rassokhi is the nearest rural locality.
