= Ozornovo =

Ozornovo Озорново
- Village
- Location within Vladimir Oblast Location within Russia
- Coordinates: 55°33′N 41°38′E
- Country: Russia
- Region: Vladimir Oblast
- District: Melenkovsky District
- Time zone: UTC+3:00

Ozornovo (Russian: Озорново) is a rural locality (a village) in Denyatinskoye Rural Settlement, Melenkovsky District, Vladimir Oblast, Russia. The population was 16 as of 2010.

== Geography ==
Ozornovo is located 28 km north of Melenki (the district's administrative centre) by road. Boytsevo is the nearest rural locality.
