= Starinki, Melenkovsky District, Vladimir Oblast =

Starinki Старинки
- Village
- Location within Vladimir Oblast Location within Russia
- Coordinates: 55°23′N 41°56′E
- Country: Russia
- Region: Vladimir Oblast
- District: Melenkovsky District
- Time zone: UTC+3:00

Starinki (Russian: Старинки) is a rural locality (a village) in Lyakhovskoye Rural Settlement, Melenkovsky District, Vladimir Oblast, Russia. The population was 13 as of 2010. There are 2 streets.

== Geography ==
Starinki is located 26 km northeast of Melenki (the district's administrative centre) by road. Grigorovo is the nearest rural locality.
