= Muralyovo =

Muralyovo Муралёво
- Village
- Location within Vladimir Oblast Location within Russia
- Coordinates: 55°28′N 41°32′E
- Country: Russia
- Region: Vladimir Oblast
- District: Melenkovsky District
- Time zone: UTC+3:00

Muralyovo (Russian: Муралёво) is a rural locality (a village) in Butylitskoye Rural Settlement, Melenkovsky District, Vladimir Oblast, Russia. The population was 2 as of 2010.

== Geography ==
Muralyovo is located 18 km north of Melenki (the district's administrative centre) by road. Vichkino is the nearest rural locality.
