= Bolshoye Zapolye =

Bolshoye Zapolye Большое Заполье
- Village
- Location within Perm Krai Location within Russia
- Coordinates: 58°33′N 56°15′E
- Country: Russia
- Region: Perm Krai
- District: Dobryansky District
- Time zone: UTC+5:00

Bolshoye Zapolye (Russian: Большое Заполье) is a rural locality (a village) in Dobryansky District, Perm Krai, Russia. The population was 4 as of 2010.

== Geography ==
Bolshoye Zapolye is located 21 km northwest of Dobryanka (the district's administrative centre) by road. Zakharovitsy is the nearest rural locality.
