= Stepankovo, Melenkovsky District, Vladimir Oblast =

Stepankovo Степаньково
- Selo
- Location within Vladimir Oblast Location within Russia
- Coordinates: 55°22′N 41°53′E
- Country: Russia
- Region: Vladimir Oblast
- District: Melenkovsky District
- Time zone: UTC+3:00

Stepankovo (Russian: Степаньково) is a rural locality (a selo) in Lyakhovskoye Rural Settlement, Melenkovsky District, Vladimir Oblast, Russia. The population was 59 as of 2010. There are 3 streets.

== Geography ==
Stepankovo is located on the Dubrovka River, 19 km east of Melenki (the district's administrative centre) by road. Fursovo is the nearest rural locality.
