= Mutnaya (settlement), Dobryansky District, Perm Krai =

Mutnaya Мутная
- Settlement
- Location within Perm Krai Location within Russia
- Coordinates: 58°20′N 56°52′E
- Country: Russia
- Region: Perm Krai
- District: Dobryansky District
- Time zone: UTC+5:00

Mutnaya (Russian: Мутная) is a rural locality (a settlement) in Dobryansky District, Perm Krai, Russia. The population was 51 as of 2010. There are 8 streets.

== Geography ==
Mutnaya is located 63 km southeast of Dobryanka (the district's administrative centre) by road. Talaya is the nearest rural locality.
