= Mutnaya (village), Dobryansky District, Perm Krai =

Mutnaya Мутная
- Village
- Location within Perm Krai Location within Russia
- Coordinates: 58°34′N 56°59′E
- Country: Russia
- Region: Perm Krai
- District: Dobryansky District
- Time zone: UTC+5:00

Mutnaya (Russian: Мутная) is a rural locality (a village) in Dobryansky District, Perm Krai, Russia. The population was 3 as of 2010. There is 1 street.

== Geography ==
Mutnaya is located 55 km northeast of Dobryanka (the district's administrative centre) by road. Vilva is the nearest rural locality.
