= Kyzh (village) =

Kyzh Кыж
- Village
- Location within Perm Krai Location within Russia
- Coordinates: 58°38′N 56°57′E
- Country: Russia
- Region: Perm Krai
- District: Dobryansky District
- Time zone: UTC+5:00

Kyzh (Russian: Кыж) is a rural locality (a village) in Dobryansky District, Perm Krai, Russia. The population was 6 as of 2010. There are 5 streets.

== Geography ==
Kyzh is located 52 km northeast of Dobryanka (the district's administrative centre) by road. Vilva is the nearest rural locality.
