= Anokhino, Melenkovsky District, Vladimir Oblast =

Anokhino Анохино
- Village
- Location within Vladimir Oblast Location within Russia
- Coordinates: 55°26′N 42°05′E
- Country: Russia
- Region: Vladimir Oblast
- District: Melenkovsky District
- Time zone: UTC+3:00

Anokhino (Russian: Анохино) is a rural locality (a village) in Lyakhovskoye Rural Settlement, Melenkovsky District, Vladimir Oblast, Russia. The population was 27 as of 2010. There are 2 streets.

== Geography ==
Anokhino is located 41 km (25 mi) northeast of Melenki (the district's administrative centre) by road. Yelino is the nearest rural locality.
