= 29 km =

29 km 29 км
- Settlement
- Location within Perm Krai Location within Russia
- Coordinates: 58°18′N 56°37′E
- Country: Russia
- Region: Perm Krai
- District: Dobryansky District
- Time zone: UTC+5:00

29 km (Russian: 29 км) is a rural locality (a settlement) in Dobryansky District, Perm Krai, Russia. The population was 2 as of 2010. There is one street.
