= Zakharovtsy =

Zakharovtsy Захаровцы
- Village
- Location within Perm Krai Location within Russia
- Coordinates: 58°33′N 56°16′E
- Country: Russia
- Region: Perm Krai
- District: Dobryansky District
- Time zone: UTC+5:00

Zakharovtsy (Russian: Захаровцы) is a rural locality (a village) in Dobryansky District, Perm Krai, Russia. The population was 2 as of 2010.

== Geography ==
Zakharovtsy is located 23 km northwest of Dobryanka (the district's administrative centre) by road. Bolshoye Zapolye is the nearest rural locality.
