= Nikulino, Dobryansky District, Perm Krai =

Nikulino Никулино
- Selo
- Location within Perm Krai Location within Russia
- Coordinates: 58°48′N 56°45′E
- Country: Russia
- Region: Perm Krai
- District: Dobryansky District
- Time zone: UTC+5:00

Nikulino (Russian: Никулино) is a rural locality (a selo) in Dobryansky District, Perm Krai, Russia. The population was 284 as of 2010. There are 8 streets.

== Geography ==
Nikulino is located 62 km northeast of Dobryanka (the district's administrative centre) by road. Kulikovo is the nearest rural locality.
