= Kononovo, Vladimir Oblast =

Kononovo Кононово
- Village
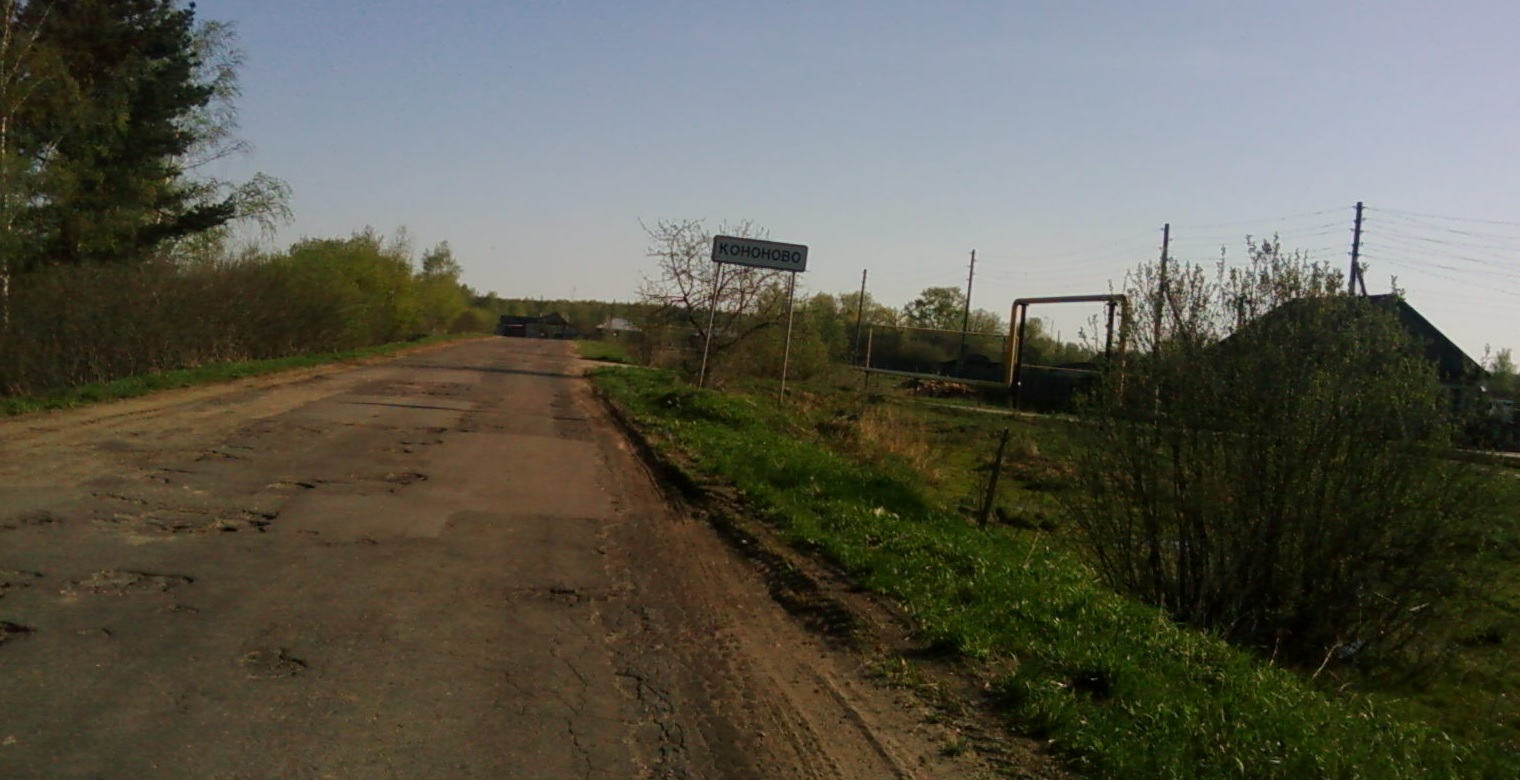
- Kononovo

- Location within Vladimir Oblast Location within Russia
- Coordinates: 55°14′N 41°46′E
- Country: Russia
- Region: Vladimir Oblast
- District: Melenkovsky District
- Time zone: UTC+3:00

Kononovo (Russian: Ко́ноново) is a rural locality (a village) in Dmitriyevogorskoye Rural Settlement, Melenkovsky District, Vladimir Oblast, Russia. The population was 375 as of 2010. There are 3 streets.

== Geography ==
Kononovo is located 21 km (13 mi) southeast of Melenki (the district's administrative centre) by road. Voyutino is the nearest rural locality.
