= Merkushevo, Dobryansky District, Perm Krai =

Merkushevo Меркушево
- Village
- Location within Perm Krai Location within Russia
- Coordinates: 58°26′N 56°15′E
- Country: Russia
- Region: Perm Krai
- District: Dobryansky District
- Time zone: UTC+5:00

Merkushevo (Russian: Меркушево) is a rural locality (a village) in Dobryansky District, Perm Krai, Russia. The population was 22 as of 2010. There are 2 streets.

== Geography ==
Merkushevo is located 35 km (22 mi) west of Dobryanka (the district's administrative centre) by road. Zvony is the nearest rural locality.
