= Kukhtym (settlement) =

Kukhtym Кухтым
- Settlement
- Location within Perm Krai Location within Russia
- Coordinates: 58°31′N 56°45′E
- Country: Russia
- Region: Perm Krai
- District: Dobryansky District
- Time zone: UTC+5:00

Kukhtym (Russian: Кухтым) is a rural locality (a settlement) in Dobryansky District, Perm Krai, Russia. The population was 10 as of 2010. There are 11 streets.

== Geography ==
Kukhtym is located 35 km northeast of Dobryanka (the district's administrative centre) by road. Kukhtym (railway station settlement) is the nearest rural locality.
