= Zavozhik =

Zavozhik Завожик
- Village
- Location within Perm Krai Location within Russia
- Coordinates: 58°26′N 56°15′E
- Country: Russia
- Region: Perm Krai
- District: Dobryansky District
- Time zone: UTC+5:00

Zavozhik (Russian: Завожик) is a rural locality (a village) in Dobryansky District, Perm Krai, Russia. The population was 80 as of 2010. There are 8 streets.

== Geography ==
Zavozhik is located 8 km north of Dobryanka (the district's administrative centre) by road. Dobryanka is the nearest rural locality.
