= Kyzh (settlement) =

Kyzh Кыж
- Settlement
- Location within Perm Krai Location within Russia
- Coordinates: 58°34′N 56°48′E
- Country: Russia
- Region: Perm Krai
- District: Dobryansky District
- Time zone: UTC+5:00

Kyzh (Russian: Кыж) is a rural locality (a settlement) in Dobryansky District, Perm Krai, Russia. The population was 129 in 2010. There are nine streets.

== Geography ==
Kyzh is located 46 km northeast of Dobryanka (the district's administrative centre) by road. Kukhtym is the nearest rural locality.
