= Kononovo, Perm Krai =

Kononovo Кононово
- Village
- Location within Perm Krai Location within Russia
- Coordinates: 58°26′N 56°14′E
- Country: Russia
- Region: Perm Krai
- District: Dobryansky District
- Time zone: UTC+5:00

Kononovo (Russian: Кононово) is a rural locality (a village) in Dobryansky District, Perm Krai, Russia. The population was 7 as of 2010. The Village has one street.

== Geography ==
Kononovo is located 32 km west of Dobryanka (the district's administrative centre) by road. Zvony is the nearest rural locality.
