= Bobki (village), Perm Krai =

Bobki Бобки
- Village
- Location within Perm Krai Location within Russia
- Coordinates: 58°12′N 56°30′E
- Country: Russia
- Region: Perm Krai
- District: Dobryansky District
- Time zone: UTC+5:00

Bobki (Russian: Бобки) is a rural locality (a village) in Dobryansky District, Perm Krai, Russia. The population was 174 as of 2010. There are 27 streets.

== Geography ==
Bobki is located 46 km south of Dobryanka (the district's administrative centre) by road. Bobki (settlement) is the nearest rural locality.
