= Yarino (village), Dobryanka, Perm Krai =

Yarino Ярино
- Village
- Location within Perm Krai Location within Russia
- Coordinates: 58°28′N 56°34′E
- Country: Russia
- Region: Perm Krai
- District: Dobryansky District
- Time zone: UTC+5:00

Yarino (Russian: Ярино) is a rural locality (a village) in Dobryansky District, Perm Krai, Russia. The population was 11 as of 2010. There are 7 streets.

== Geography ==
Yarino is located 13 km east of Dobryanka (the district's administrative centre) by road. Traktovy is the nearest rural locality.
