= Zalesnaya =

Zalesnaya Залесная
- Village
- Location within Perm Krai Location within Russia
- Coordinates: 58°31′N 56°09′E
- Country: Russia
- Region: Perm Krai
- District: Dobryansky District
- Time zone: UTC+5:00

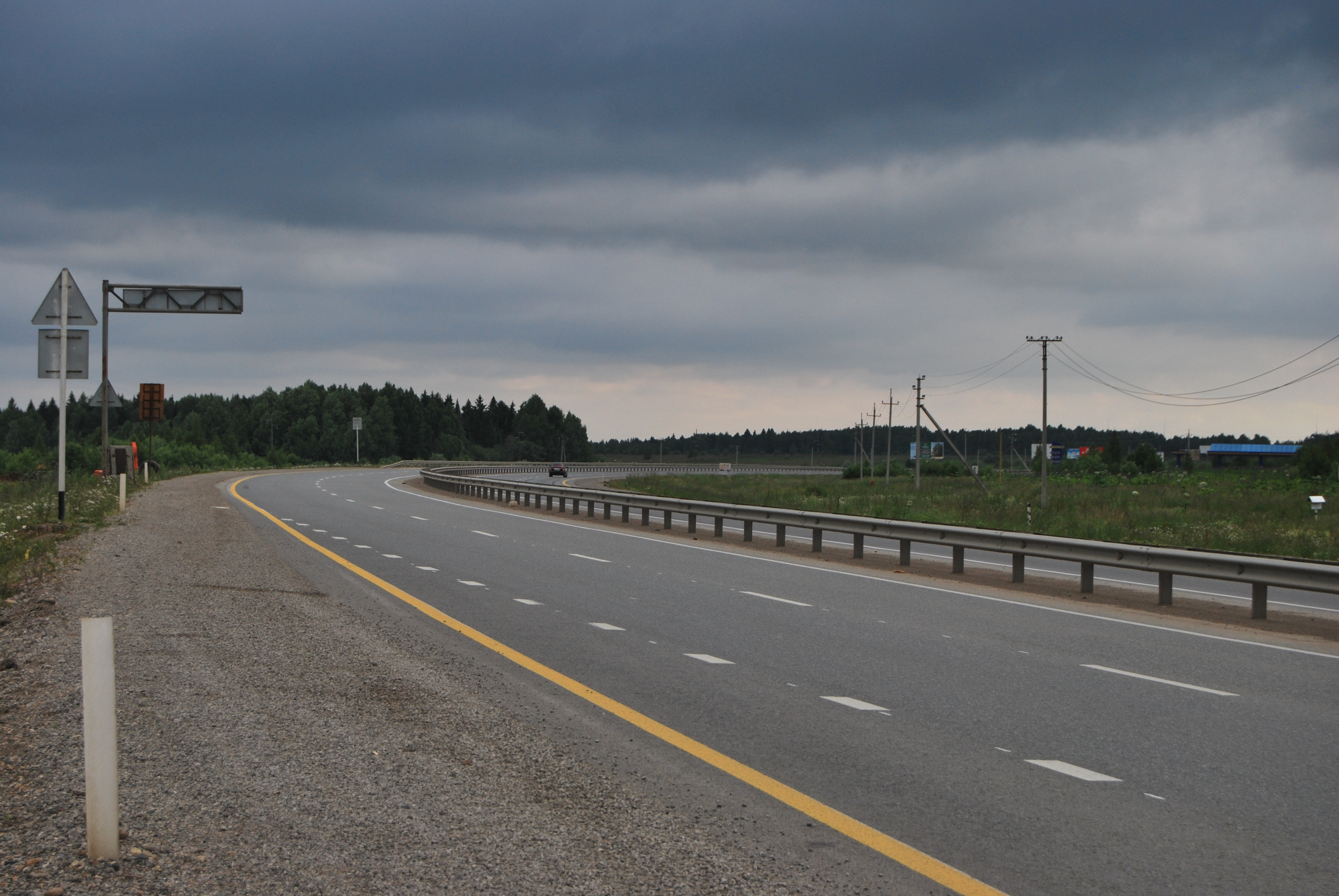
Zalesnaya, Permskiy kray, Russia

Zalesnaya (Russian: Залесная) is a rural locality (a village) and the administrative center of Krasnosludskoye Rural Settlement, Dobryansky District, Perm Krai, Russia. The population was 419 as of 2010. There are 34 streets.

== Geography ==
Zalesnaya is located 46 km south of Dobryanka (the district's administrative centre) by road. Kuligino is the nearest rural locality.
