= Kukhtym (railway station settlement) =

Kukhtym Кухтым
- Settlement
- Location within Perm Krai Location within Russia
- Coordinates: 58°30′N 56°46′E
- Country: Russia
- Region: Perm Krai
- District: Dobryansky District
- Time zone: UTC+5:00

Kukhtym (Russian: Кухтым) is a rural locality (a settlement) in Dobryansky District, Perm Krai, Russia. The population was 85 as of 2010. There are 5 streets.
