= Traktovy =

Traktovy Трактовый
- Settlement
- Location within Perm Krai Location within Russia
- Coordinates: 58°26′N 56°35′E
- Country: Russia
- Region: Perm Krai
- District: Dobryansky District
- Time zone: UTC+5:00

Traktovy (Russian: Трактовый) is a rural locality (a settlement) in Dobryansky District, Perm Krai, Russia. The population was 25 as of 2010. There are 6 streets.
