= Bobki (settlement), Perm Krai =

Bobki Бобки
- Settlement
- Location within Perm Krai Location within Russia
- Coordinates: 58°12′N 56°30′E
- Country: Russia
- Region: Perm Krai
- District: Dobryansky District
- Time zone: UTC+5:00

Bobki (Russian: Бобки) is a rural locality (a settlement) in Dobryansky District, Perm Krai, Russia. The population was 80 as of 2010. There are 2 streets.
