= Zaborye, Dobryansky District =

Zaborye Заборье
- Village
- Location within Perm Krai Location within Russia
- Coordinates: 58°17′N 56°21′E
- Country: Russia
- Region: Perm Krai
- District: Dobryansky District
- Time zone: UTC+5:00

Zaborye (Russian: Заборье) is a rural locality (a village) in Dobryansky District, Perm Krai, Russia. The population was 25 as of 2010. There are 9 streets.
