= Dobryanskoye Urban Settlement =

Dobryanskoye Urban Settlement (Russian: Добря́нское городско́е поселе́ние) is a municipal formation (an urban settlement) within Dobryansky Municipal District of Perm Krai, Russia, which a part of the territory of the town of krai significance of Dobryanka is incorporated as. It is one of the two urban settlements in the municipal district.
