= Anokhino, Vologda Oblast =

Anokhino Анохино
- Village
- Location within Vologda Oblast Location within Russia
- Coordinates: 58°47′N 40°47′E
- Country: Russia
- Region: Vologda Oblast
- District: Gryazovetsky District
- Time zone: UTC+3:00

Anokhino (Russian: Анохино) is a rural locality (a village) in Sidorovskoye Rural Settlement, Gryazovetsky District, Vologda Oblast, Russia. The population was 334 as of 2002 and 100% of the population was of Russian ethnicity. There are 2 streets.

== Geography ==
Anokhino is located 38 km (24 mi) southeast of Gryazovets (the district's administrative centre) by road. Panovo is the nearest rural locality.
