= Anokhino, Kovrovsky District, Vladimir Oblast =

Anokhino Анохино
- Village
- Location within Vladimir Oblast Location within Russia
- Coordinates: 56°12′N 41°13′E
- Country: Russia
- Region: Vladimir Oblast
- District: Kovrovsky District
- Time zone: UTC+3:00

Anokhino (Russian: Анохино) is a rural locality (a village) in Novoselskoye Rural Settlement, Kovrovsky District, Vladimir Oblast, Russia. The population was 3 as of 2010. There are 3 streets.

== Geography ==
Anokhino is located 26 km southwest of Kovrov (the district's administrative centre) by road. Pestovo is the nearest rural locality.
