= Kononovo, Ustyuzhensky District, Vologda Oblast =

Village in Vologda Oblast, Russia

Kononovo Кононово
- Village
- Location within Vologda Oblast Location within Russia
- Coordinates: 58°48′N 36°37′E
- Country: Russia
- Region: Vologda Oblast
- District: Ustyuzhensky District
- Time zone: UTC+3:00

Kononovo (Russian: Кононово) is a rural locality (a village) in Soshnevskoye Rural Settlement, Ustyuzhensky District, Vologda Oblast, Russia. The population was 18 as of 2002.

== Geography ==
Kononovo is located 13 km (8.1 mi) southeast of Ustyuzhna (the district's administrative centre) by road. Myza-Testovo is the nearest rural locality.
