= Stepankovo, Muromsky District, Vladimir Oblast =

Stepankovo Степаньково
- Village
- Location within Vladimir Oblast Location within Russia
- Coordinates: 55°40′N 41°58′E
- Country: Russia
- Region: Vladimir Oblast
- District: Muromsky District
- Time zone: UTC+3:00

Stepankovo (Russian: Степаньково) is a rural locality (a village) in Borisoglebskoye Rural Settlement, Muromsky District, Vladimir Oblast, Russia. The population was 518 as of 2010. There are 8 streets.

== Geography ==
Stepankovo is located 15 km northwest of Murom (the district's administrative centre) by road. Sannikovo is the nearest rural locality.
