= Nikulino, Permsky District, Perm Krai =

Nikulino Никулино
- Village
- Location within Perm Krai Location within Russia
- Coordinates: 57°55′N 56°41′E
- Country: Russia
- Region: Perm Krai
- District: Permsky District
- Time zone: UTC+5:00

Nikulino (Russian: Никулино) is a rural locality (a village) in Frolovskoye Rural Settlement, Permsky District, Perm Krai, Russia. The population was 5 as of 2010. There are 12 streets.

== Geography ==
Nikulino is located 37 km southeast of Perm (the district's administrative centre) by road. Zhebrei is the nearest rural locality.
