= Merkushevo, Permsky District, Perm Krai =

Merkushevo Меркушево
- Village
- Location within Perm Krai Location within Russia
- Coordinates: 57°50′N 56°25′E
- Country: Russia
- Region: Perm Krai
- District: Permsky District
- Time zone: UTC+5:00

Merkushevo (Russian: Меркушево) is a rural locality (a village) in Lobanovskoye Rural Settlement, Permsky District, Perm Krai, Russia. The population was 21 as of 2010. There are 4 streets.

== Geography ==
Merkushevo is located 27 km southeast of Perm (the district's administrative centre) by road. Verkh-Syra is the nearest rural locality.
