= Kononovo, Vashkinsky District, Vologda Oblast =

Kononovo Кононово
- Village
- Location within Vologda Oblast Location within Russia
- Coordinates: 60°27′N 37°56′E
- Country: Russia
- Region: Vologda Oblast
- District: Vashkinsky District
- Time zone: UTC+3:00

Kononovo (Russian: Кононово) is a rural locality (a village) in Andreyevskoye Rural Settlement, Vashkinsky District, Vologda Oblast, Russia. The population was 31 as of 2002.

== Geography ==
Kononovo is located 24 km north of Lipin Bor (the district's administrative centre) by road. Davydovo is the nearest rural locality.
