= Dobryansky District =

Dobryansky District Добрянский район (Russian)
- District
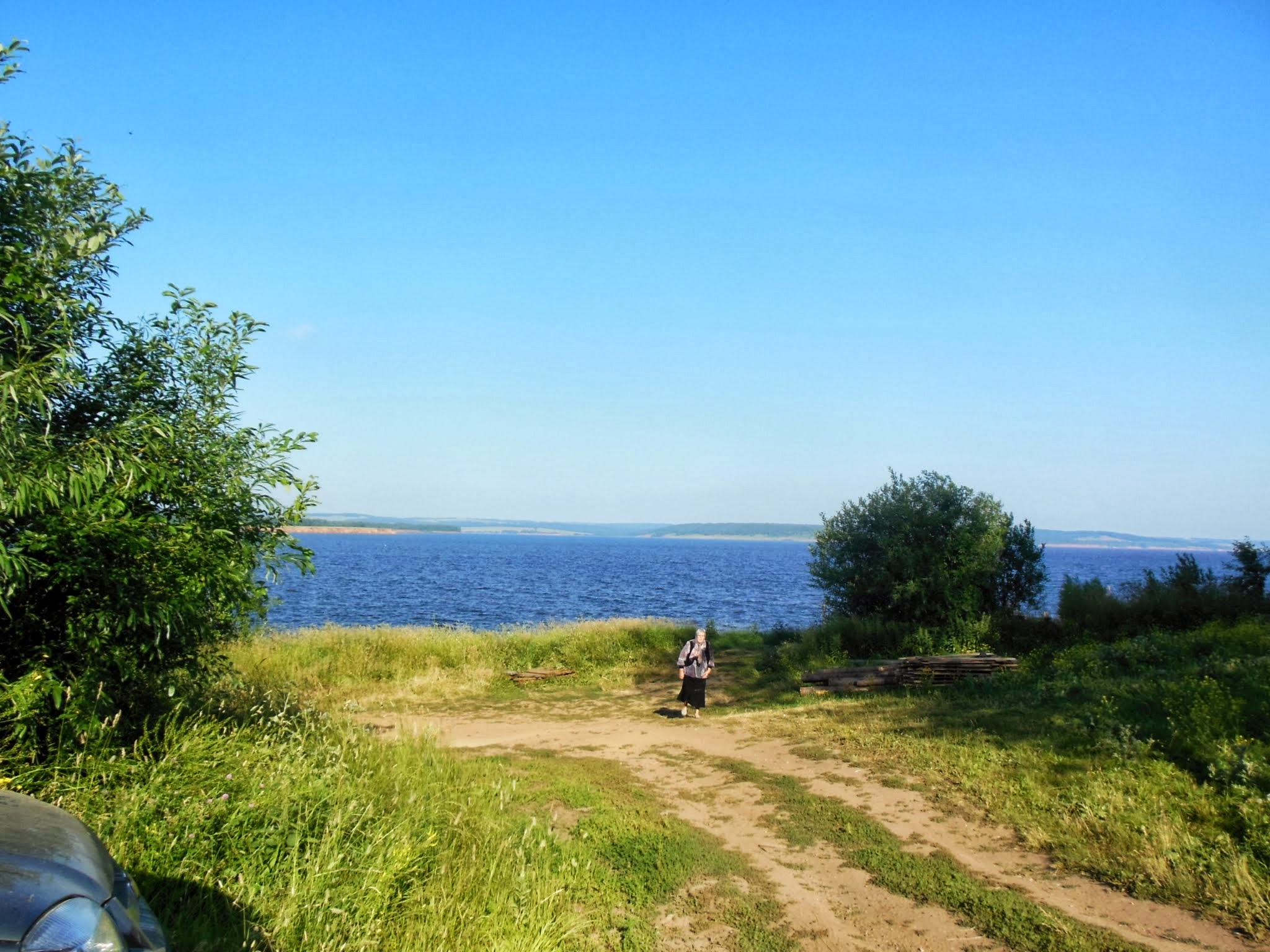
- Landscape in Dobryansky District

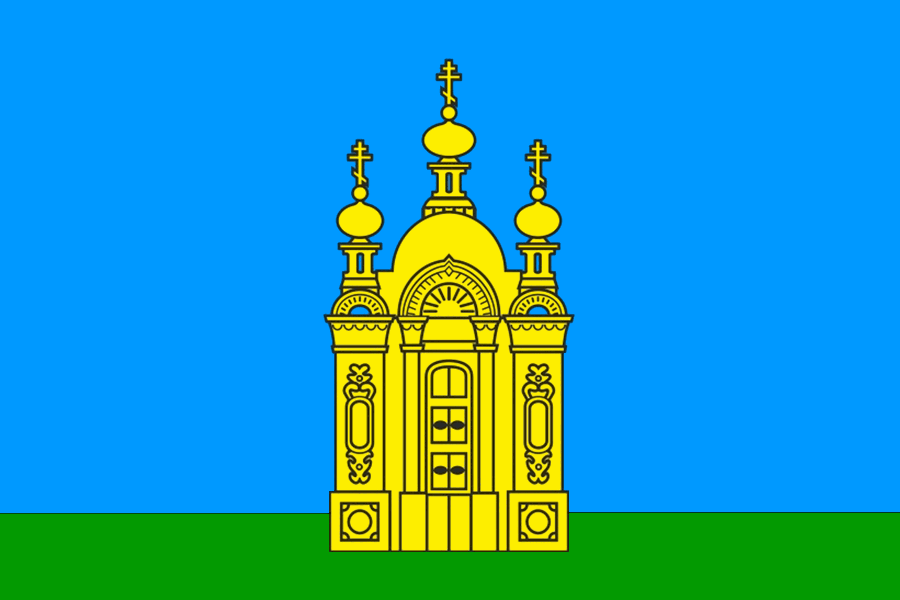
- Flag Coat of arms
- Coordinates: 58.482°N 55.037°E
- Country: Russia
- Federal subject: Perm Krai
- Established: 3 November 1923
- Administrative center: Dobryanka

Area
  - Total: 5,192 km^{2} (2,005 sq mi)

Population
  - Estimate (2002): 64,400
- Time zone: UTC+5 (MSK+2)
- OKTMO ID: 57616000

Dobryansky district (Russian: Добрянский район) was an administrative district of Perm Krai, Russia. Its centre is the town of Dobryanka. Its area is 5,192 km^{2}, 70% of which covered by forest. Main minerals are oil, gypsum and gravel.

== Population ==
The district's population is 64,400 (2002 census). Ethnically, 91.5% are Russians; 2.5% are Tatars; 1.2% are Komi-Permyaks and 4.8% are others. Most of the population live in Dobryanka (59.8%) and Polazna (19.8%).

== See also ==
- Zakharovtsy
- Zalesnaya
- Zavozhik
- Zaborye
