= Dobryanka, Perm Krai =

Town in Perm Krai, Russia

Dobryanka Добрянка
- Town
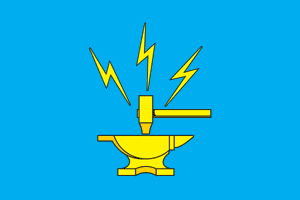
- Flag Coat of arms
- Interactive map of Dobryanka
- Location of Dobryanka Dobryanka (Perm Krai)
- Coordinates: 58°28′N 56°25′E
- Country: Russia
- Federal subject: Perm Krai
- First mentioned: 1623
- Town status since: 1943
- Elevation: 130 m (430 ft)

Population (2010 Census)
  - Total: 33,686
  - Estimate (2023): 28,545 (−15.3%)

Administrative status
  - Subordinated to: town of krai significance of Dobryanka
  - Capital of: town of krai significance of Dobryanka

Municipal status
  - Municipal district: Dobryansky Municipal District
  - Urban settlement: Dobryanskoye Urban Settlement
  - Capital of: Dobryansky Municipal District, Dobryanskoye Urban Settlement
- Time zone: UTC+5 (MSK+2)
- Postal codes: 618740–618742, 618749
- OKTMO ID: 57616101001
- Website: dobryanka-city.ru

Dobryanka (Russian: Добря́нка) is a town in Perm Krai, Russia, located on the bank of the Kama Reservoir, 61 kilometers (38 mi) north of Perm, the administrative center of the krai. Population: 33,686 (2010 census); 36,436 (2002 census); 35,317 (1989 Soviet census).

== History ==
Considered to be one of the oldest inhabited localities in Perm Krai, Dobryanka was first mentioned in 1623. In 1752, an ironworks was built at the mouth of the Dobryanka River, and a settlement developed around it. In 1943, the settlement was granted town status. The town served as the administrative center of Dobryansky District, which was abolished in 1993.

=== 2026 school stabbing ===
On 7 April 2026, a 17-year-old student named Maxim stabbed his teacher to death at School No. 5 in Dobryanka, Perm Krai, Russia. According to Izvestia, this attack was the 16th instance of weapons being used in Russian schools in 2026.

== Administrative and municipal status ==
Within the framework of administrative divisions, it is, together with the work settlement of Polazna and 110 rural localities, incorporated as the town of krai significance of Dobryanka—an administrative unit with the status equal to that of the districts. As a municipal division, the town of Dobryanka, together with 8 rural localities, is incorporated as Dobryanskoye Urban Settlement within Dobryansky Municipal District and serves as the municipal district's administrative center. The work settlement of Polazna and the remaining 102 rural localities are grouped into one urban settlement and six rural settlements within Dobryansky Municipal District.

== Economy ==
Perm GRES—a huge power station with a 330-meter (1,080 ft) tall chimney—is located in Dobryanka.
