= Melenki, Vladimir Oblast =

Town in Vladimir Oblast, Russia

Melenki Меленки
- Town
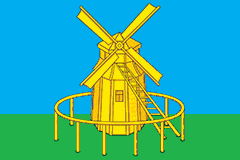
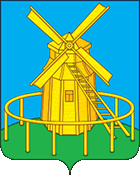
- Flag Coat of arms
- Interactive map of Melenki
- Location of Melenki Melenki (Vladimir Oblast)
- Coordinates: 55°20′N 41°39′E
- Country: Russia
- Federal subject: Vladimir Oblast
- Administrative district: Melenkovsky District
- Founded: 17th century
- Town status since: 1778
- Elevation: 130 m (430 ft)

Population (2010 Census)
  - Total: 15,206
  - Estimate (2021): 13,407 (−11.8%)

Administrative status
  - Capital of: Melenkovsky District

Municipal status
  - Municipal district: Melenkovsky Municipal District
  - Urban settlement: Melenki Urban Settlement
  - Capital of: Melenkovsky Municipal District, Melenki Urban Settlement
- Time zone: UTC+3 (MSK)
- Postal code: 602102
- OKTMO ID: 17642101001

Melenki (Russian: Ме́ленки) is a town and the administrative center of Melenkovsky District in Vladimir Oblast, Russia, located in the Meshchera Lowlands on the banks of the Unzha, 150 kilometers (93 mi) southeast of Vladimir, the administrative center of the oblast. Population: 13,407 (2021 census); 15,206 (2010 census); 16,344 (2002 census); 18,340 (1989 Soviet census).

== History ==
Melenki was granted town status in 1778.

== Administrative and municipal status ==
Within the framework of administrative divisions, Melenki serves as the administrative center of Melenkovsky District, to which it is directly subordinated. As a municipal division, the town of Melenki is incorporated within Melenkovsky Municipal District as Melenki Urban Settlement.
