= Melenkovsky District =

Melenkovsky District Меленковский район (Russian)
- District
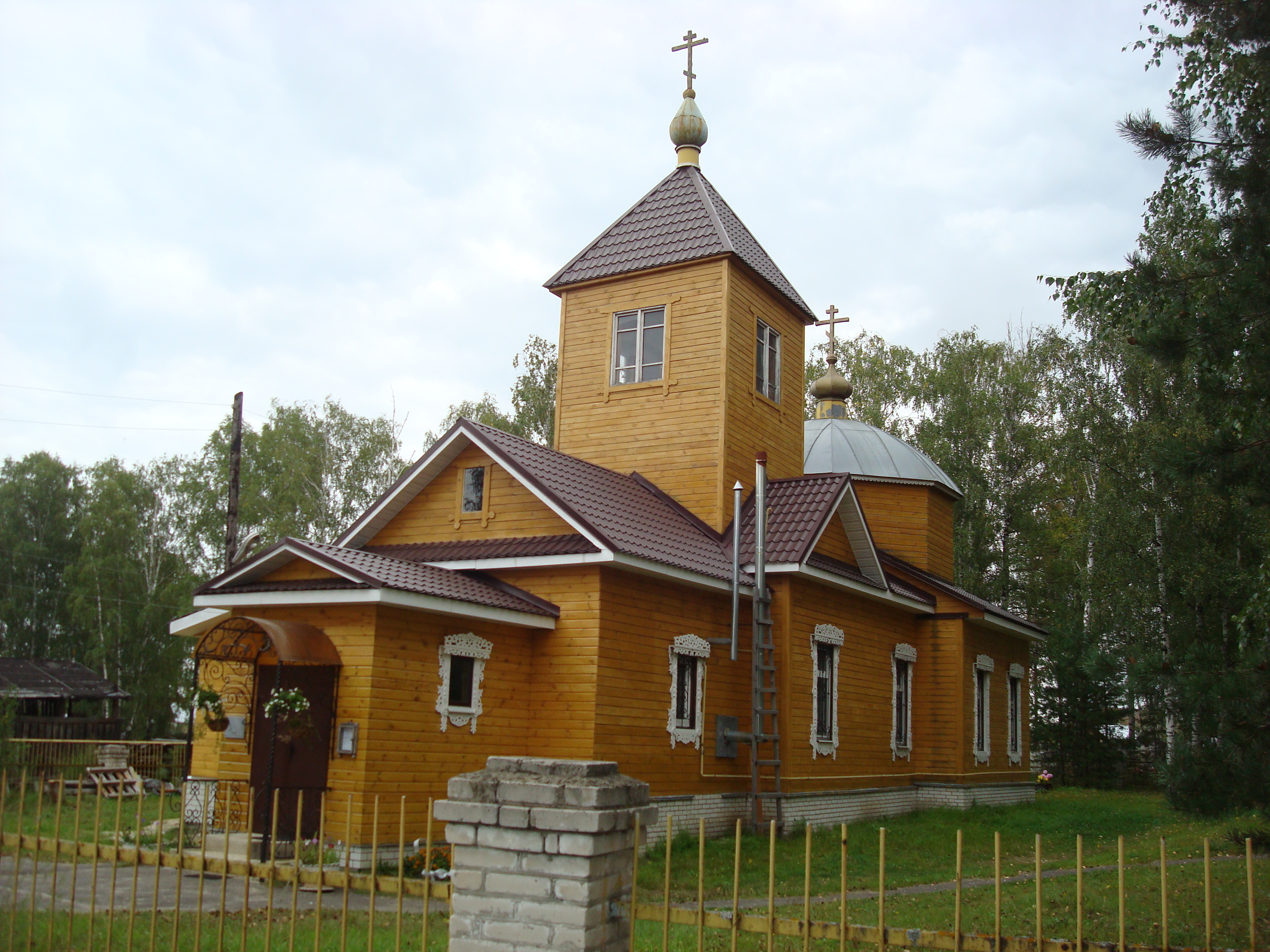
- Church of the Assumption: Wojnowo, Melenkovsky District

- Flag Coat of arms
- Location of Melenkovsky District in Vladimir Oblast
- Coordinates: 55°20′N 41°38′E
- Country: Russia
- Federal subject: Vladimir Oblast
- Established: 10 April 1929
- Administrative center: Melenki

Area
  - Total: 2,222 km^{2} (858 sq mi)

Population (2010 Census)
  - Total: 36,464
  - Density: 16.41/km^{2} (42.50/sq mi)
  - Urban: 41.7%
  - Rural: 58.3%

Administrative structure
  - Inhabited localities: 1 cities/towns, 120 rural localities

Municipal structure
  - Municipally incorporated as: Melenkovsky Municipal District
  - Municipal divisions: 1 urban settlements, 7 rural settlements
- Time zone: UTC+3 (MSK)
- OKTMO ID: 17642000
- Website: http://www.melenky.ru/

Melenkovsky District (Russian: Меленко́вский райо́н) is an administrative and municipal district (raion), one of the sixteen in Vladimir Oblast, Russia. It is located in the southeast of the oblast. The area of the district is 2,221 square kilometers (858 sq mi). Its administrative center is the town of Melenki. Population: 32,701 (2021 census); 36,464 (2010 census); 41,125 (2002 Census); 49,712 (1989 Soviet census). The population of Melenki accounts for 41.0% of the district's total population.
