= Vizhaikha =

Vizhaikha may refer to the following places in Russia:

- Vizhaikha (Vishera), a tributary of the Vishera in Perm Krai
- Vizhaikha (Kolva), a tributary of the Kolva in Perm Krai
- Vizhaikha, Perm Krai, a settlement in Cherdynsky District, Perm Krai
