= Beryozovka (Perm Krai) =

Location
- Country: Russia

Physical characteristics
- Mouth: Lake Chusovskoye
  - coordinates: 61.2531°N 56.552°E
- Length: 141 km (88 mi)
- Basin size: 1,970 km^{2} (760 sq mi)

Basin features
- Progression: Lake Chusovskoye→ Visherka→ Kolva→ Vishera→ Kama→ Volga→ Caspian Sea

The Beryozovka (Russian: Берёзовка) is a river in Komi Republic and Perm Krai, Russia. It starts in Pechora-Ilych Nature Reserve in Komi Republic and flows into Lake Chusovskoye in the north of Cherdynsky District of Perm Krai. The river is 141 kilometres (88 mi) long. The area of its basin is 1,970 square kilometres (760 mi^{2}).
