= Molmys =

River in Perm Krai, Russia

Location
- Country: Russia

Physical characteristics
- Source
  - location: Kvarkush
- Mouth: Yazva
  - coordinates: 60.0624°N 57.7414°E
- Length: 100 km (62 mi)
- Basin size: 1,090 km^{2} (420 sq mi)

Basin features
- Progression: Yazva→ Vishera→ Kama→ Volga→ Caspian Sea

The Molmys (Russian: Молмыс) is a river in Perm Krai, Russia, a left tributary of the Yazva. It is 100 kilometres (62 mi) long, and the area of its drainage basin is 1,090 square kilometres (420 mi^{2}). It starts on the southeastern slope of Mount Vogulsky Kamen, in the middle part of the Kvarkush mountain range. It flows through the southeastern portion of Krasnovishersky District, its mouth located upstream of the settlement Krasny Bereg. There are many rapids throughout the river, and the bottom is rocky.

Main tributaries:

- Left: Burnima, Bolshaya Kyzya, Bolshaya Ursa;
- Right: Grebeshkova, Bolshaya Munya, Bystraya.
