= Nizhneye Zapolye =

Nizhneye Zapolye Нижнее Заполье
- Village
- Location within Perm Krai Location within Russia
- Coordinates: 60°02′N 57°32′E
- Country: Russia
- Region: Perm Krai
- District: Krasnovishersky District
- Time zone: UTC+5:00

Nizhneye Zapolye (Russian: Нижнее Заполье) is a rural locality (a village) in Krasnovishersky District, Perm Krai, Russia. The population was 6 as of 2010. There are 2 streets.

== Geography ==
Nizhneye Zapolye is located 56 km southeast of Krasnovishersk (the district's administrative centre) by road. Arefina is the nearest rural locality.
