= Nizhnyaya Bychina =

Nizhnyaya Bychina Нижняя Бычина
- Village
- Location within Perm Krai Location within Russia
- Coordinates: 60°07′N 57°16′E
- Country: Russia
- Region: Perm Krai
- District: Krasnovishersky District
- Time zone: UTC+5:00

Nizhnyaya Bychina (Russian: Нижняя Бычина) is a rural locality (a village) in Krasnovishersky District, Perm Krai, Russia. The population was 30 as of 2010. There is 1 street.

== Geography ==
Nizhnyaya Bychina is located 37 km southeast of Krasnovishersk (the district's administrative centre) by road. Bychina is the nearest rural locality.
