= Visherogorsk =

Visherogorsk Вишерогорск
- Settlement
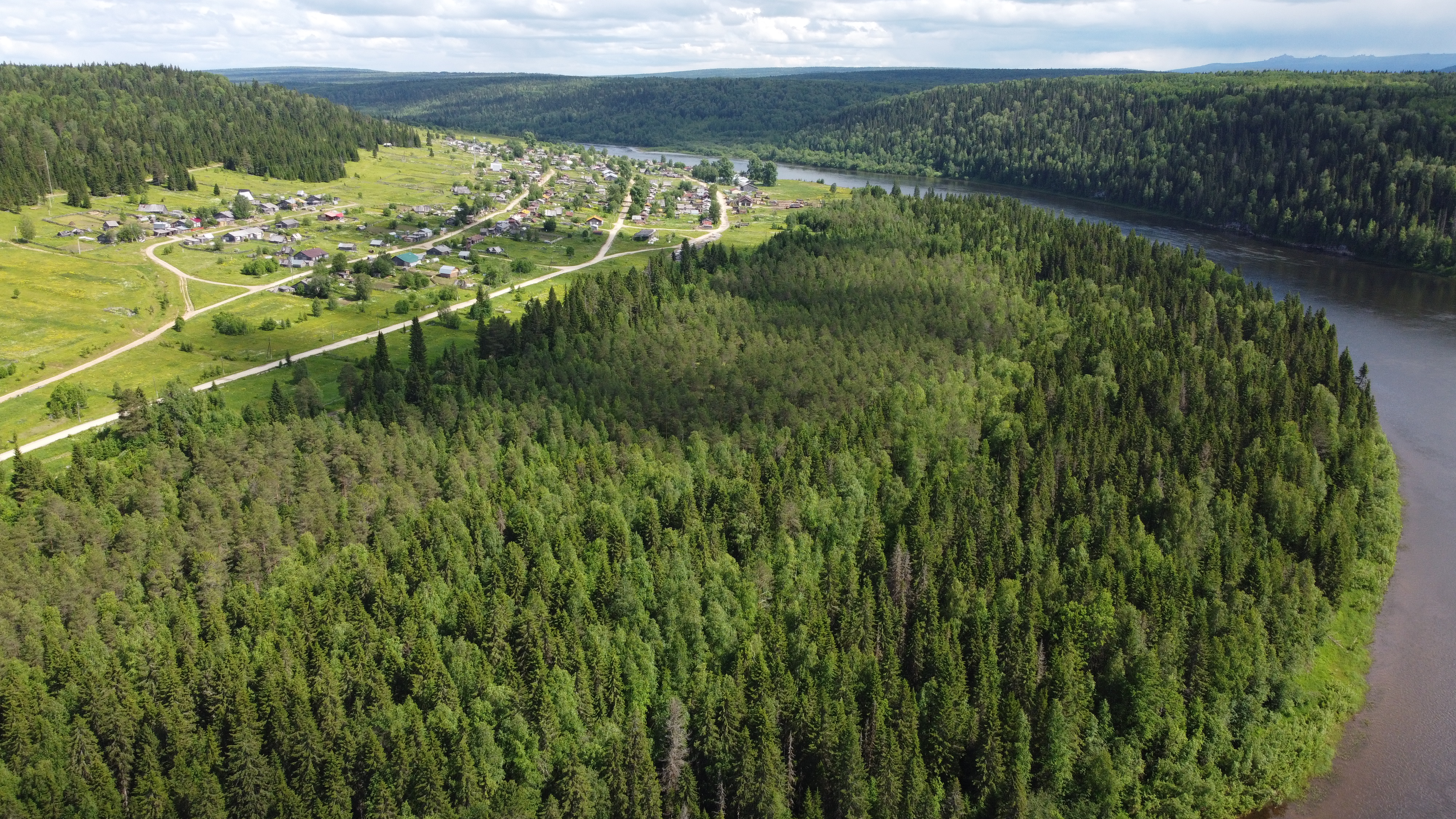
- Visherogorsk and Vishera River

- Location within Perm Krai Location within Russia
- Coordinates: 60°27′N 57°21′E
- Country: Russia
- Region: Perm Krai
- District: Krasnovishersky District
- Time zone: UTC+5:00

Visherogorsk (Russian: Вишерогорск) is a rural locality (a settlement) and the administrative center of Visherogorskoye Rural Settlement, Krasnovishersky District, Perm Krai, Russia. The population was 440 as of 2010. There are 4 streets.

== Geography ==
Visherogorsk is located 19 km northeast of Krasnovishersk (the district's administrative centre) by road. Storozhevaya is the nearest rural locality.
