= Vankova, Perm Krai =

Vankova Ванькова
- Village
- Location within Perm Krai Location within Russia
- Coordinates: 60°01′N 57°38′E
- Country: Russia
- Region: Perm Krai
- District: Krasnovishersky District
- Time zone: UTC+5:00

Vankova (Russian: Ванькова) is a rural locality (a village) in Krasnovishersky District, Perm Krai, Russia. The population was 185 as of 2010. There are 4 streets.

== Geography ==
Vankova is located 62 km southeast of Krasnovishersk (the district's administrative centre) by road. Simanova is the nearest rural locality.
