= Severny Kolchim =

Severny Kolchim Северный Колчим
- Settlement
- Location within Perm Krai Location within Russia
- Coordinates: 60°15′N 57°59′E
- Country: Russia
- Region: Perm Krai
- District: Krasnovishersky District
- Time zone: UTC+5:00

Severny Kolchim (Russian: Северный Колчим) is a rural locality (a settlement) in Krasnovishersky District, Perm Krai, Russia. The population was 631 as of 2010. There are 14 streets.

== Geography ==
Severny Kolchim is located 73 km southeast of Krasnovishersk (the district's administrative centre) by road. Verkhneye Zapolye is the nearest rural locality.
