= Nizhnyaya Yazva =

Nizhnyaya Yazva Нижняя Язьва
- Village
- Location within Perm Krai Location within Russia
- Coordinates: 60°15′N 56°51′E
- Country: Russia
- Region: Perm Krai
- District: Krasnovishersky District
- Time zone: UTC+5:00

Nizhnyaya Yazva (Russian: Нижняя Язьва) is a rural locality (a village) in Krasnovishersky District, Perm Krai, Russia. The population was 69 as of 2010. There are 3 streets.

== Geography ==
Nizhnyaya Yazva is located 23 km southwest of Krasnovishersk (the district's administrative centre) by road. Kotomysh is the nearest rural locality.
