= Romanikha =

Romanikha Романиха
- Settlement
- Location within Perm Krai Location within Russia
- Coordinates: 60°32′N 57°09′E
- Country: Russia
- Region: Perm Krai
- District: Krasnovishersky District
- Time zone: UTC+5:00

Romanikha (Russian: Романиха) is a rural locality (a settlement) in Krasnovishersky District, Perm Krai, Russia. The population was 71 as of 2010. There are 2 streets.

== Geography ==
Romanikha is located 34 km north of Krasnovishersk (the district's administrative centre) by road. Zagovorukha is the nearest rural locality.
