= Yaborova =

Yaborova Яборова
- Village
- Location within Perm Krai Location within Russia
- Coordinates: 60°16′N 57°08′E
- Country: Russia
- Region: Perm Krai
- District: Krasnovishersky District
- Time zone: UTC+5:00

Yaborova (Russian: Яборова) is a rural locality (a village) in Krasnovishersky District, Perm Krai, Russia. The population was 40 as of 2010. There are 3 streets.

== Geography ==
Yaborova is located 18 km south of Krasnovishersk (the district's administrative centre) by road. Ivachina is the nearest rural locality.
