= Konovalova, Perm Krai =

Konovalova Коновалова
- Village
- Location within Perm Krai Location within Russia
- Coordinates: 60°01′N 57°43′E
- Country: Russia
- Region: Perm Krai
- District: Krasnovishersky District
- Time zone: UTC+5:00

Konovalova (Russian: Коновалова) is a rural locality (a village) in Krasnovishersky District, Perm Krai, Russia. The population was 2 as of 2010.

== Geography ==
Konovalova is located 69 km southeast of Krasnovishersk (the district's administrative centre) by road. Krasny Bereg is the nearest rural locality.
