= Zolotanka =

Zolotanka Золотанка
- Settlement
- Location within Perm Krai Location within Russia
- Coordinates: 60°28′N 58°34′E
- Country: Russia
- Region: Perm Krai
- District: Krasnovishersky District
- Time zone: UTC+5:00

Zolotanka (Russian: Золотанка) is a rural locality (a settlement) in Krasnovishersky District, Perm Krai, Russia. The population was 78 as of 2010. There are 3 streets.

== Geography ==
Zolotanka is located 114 km east of Krasnovishersk (the district's administrative centre) by road. Ust-Uls is the nearest rural locality.
