= Sypuchi =

Sypuchi Сыпучи
- Settlement
- Location within Perm Krai Location within Russia
- Coordinates: 60°33′N 57°48′E
- Country: Russia
- Region: Perm Krai
- District: Krasnovishersky District
- Time zone: UTC+5:00

Sypuchi (Russian: Сыпучи) is a rural locality (a settlement) in Krasnovishersky District, Perm Krai, Russia. The population was 64 as of 2010. There are 3 streets.

== Geography ==
Sypuchi is located 70 km northeast of Krasnovishersk (the district's administrative centre) by road. Volynka is the nearest rural locality.
