= Simanova =

Simanova Симанова
- Village
- Location within Perm Krai Location within Russia
- Coordinates: 60°01′N 57°38′E
- Country: Russia
- Region: Perm Krai
- District: Krasnovishersky District
- Time zone: UTC+5:00

Simanova (Russian: Симанова) is a rural locality (a village) in Krasnovishersky District, Perm Krai, Russia. The population was 24 as of 2010. There is 1 street.

== Geography ==
Simanova is located 64 km southeast of Krasnovishersk (the district's administrative centre) by road. Vankova is the nearest rural locality.
