= Talavol =

Talavol Талавол
- Village
- Location within Perm Krai Location within Russia
- Coordinates: 60°03′N 57°30′E
- Country: Russia
- Region: Perm Krai
- District: Krasnovishersky District
- Time zone: UTC+5:00

Talavol (Russian: Талавол) is a rural locality (a village) in Krasnovishersky District, Perm Krai, Russia. The population was 26 as of 2010. There are 2 streets.

== Geography ==
Talavol is located 54 km southeast of Krasnovishersk (the district's administrative centre) by road. Arefina is the nearest rural locality.
