= Antipina, Krasnovishersky District, Perm Krai =

Antipina Антипина
- Village
- Location within Perm Krai Location within Russia
- Coordinates: 60°02′N 57°32′E
- Country: Russia
- Region: Perm Krai
- District: Krasnovishersky District
- Time zone: UTC+5:00

Antipina (Russian: Антипина) is a rural locality (a village) in Krasnovishersky District, Perm Krai, Russia. The population was 192 as of 2010. There are 5 streets.

== Geography ==
Antipina is located 57 km southeast of Krasnovishersk (the district's administrative centre) by road. Parshakova is the nearest rural locality.
