= Gubdor =

Gubdor Губдор
- Selo
- Location within Perm Krai Location within Russia
- Coordinates: 60°11′N 56°38′E
- Country: Russia
- Region: Perm Krai
- District: Krasnovishersky District
- Time zone: UTC+5:00

Gubdor (Russian: Губдор) is a rural locality (a selo) in Krasnovishersky District, Perm Krai, Russia. The population was 71 as of 2010. There are 7 streets.

== Geography ==
Gubdor is located 38 km southwest of Krasnovishersk (the district's administrative centre) by road. Rategova is the nearest rural locality.
