= Akchim, Perm Krai =

Akchim Акчим
- Village
- Location within Perm Krai Location within Russia
- Coordinates: 60°28′N 58°02′E
- Country: Russia
- Region: Perm Krai
- District: Krasnovishersky District
- Time zone: UTC+5:00

Akchim (Russian: Акчим) is a rural locality (a village) in Krasnovishersky District, Perm Krai, Russia. The population was 3 as of 2010.

== Geography ==
Akchim is located 63 km east of Krasnovishersk (the district's administrative centre) by road. Mutikha is the nearest rural locality.
