= Volynka, Perm Krai =

Volynka Волынка
- Settlement
- Location within Perm Krai Location within Russia
- Coordinates: 60°22′N 57°42′E
- Country: Russia
- Region: Perm Krai
- District: Krasnovishersky District
- Time zone: UTC+5:00

Volynka (Russian: Волынка) is a rural locality (a settlement) and the administrative center of Vayskoye Rural Settlement, Krasnovishersky District, Perm Krai, Russia. The population was 52 as of 2010. There are 5 streets.

== Geography ==
Volynka is located 40 km east of Krasnovishersk (the district's administrative centre) by road. Visherogorsk is the nearest rural locality.
