= Verkhneye Zapolye =

Verkhneye Zapolye Верхнее Заполье
- Village
- Location within Perm Krai Location within Russia
- Coordinates: 60°02′N 57°31′E
- Country: Russia
- Region: Perm Krai
- District: Krasnovishersky District
- Time zone: UTC+5:00

Verkhneye Zapolye (Russian: Верхнее Заполье) is a rural locality (a village) in Krasnovishersky District, Perm Krai, Russia. The population was 3 as of 2010. There is 1 street.

== Geography ==
Verkhneye Zapolye is located 55 km southeast of Krasnovishersk (the district's administrative centre) by road. Arefina is the nearest rural locality.
