= Oralovo =

Oralovo Оралово
- Village
- Location within Perm Krai Location within Russia
- Coordinates: 60°29′N 56°52′E
- Country: Russia
- Region: Perm Krai
- District: Krasnovishersky District
- Time zone: UTC+5:00

Oralovo (Russian: Оралово) is a rural locality (a village) in Krasnovishersky District, Perm Krai, Russia. The population was 2 as of 2010. There is 1 street.

== Geography ==
Oralovo is located 19 km northwest of Krasnovishersk (the district's administrative centre) by road. Krasnovishersk is the nearest rural locality.
