= Chudov =

Chudov (Russian: Чудов, from чудо meaning miracle) or Chudova may refer to

- Chudov Monastery in Moscow
- Chudova, a river in Perm Krai, Russia
- Chudov (surname)
