= Ust-Yazva =

Ust-Yazva Усть-Язьва
- Settlement
- Location within Perm Krai Location within Russia
- Coordinates: 60°21′N 56°48′E
- Country: Russia
- Region: Perm Krai
- District: Krasnovishersky District
- Time zone: UTC+5:00

Ust-Yazva (Russian: Усть-Язьва) is a rural locality (a settlement) and the administrative center of Ust-Yazvinskoye Rural Settlement, Krasnovishersky District, Perm Krai, Russia. The population was 564 as of 2010. There are 17 streets.

== Geography ==
Ust-Yazva is located 37 km southwest of Krasnovishersk (the district's administrative centre) by road. Danilov Lug is the nearest rural locality.
