= Tsepel =

Tsepel Цепёл
- Settlement
- Location within Perm Krai Location within Russia
- Coordinates: 60°07′N 57°20′E
- Country: Russia
- Region: Perm Krai
- District: Krasnovishersky District
- Time zone: UTC+5:00

Tsepel (Russian: Цепёл) is a rural locality (a settlement) in Krasnovishersky District, Perm Krai, Russia. The population was 353 as of 2010. There are 8 streets.

== Geography ==
Tsepel is located 39 km southeast of Krasnovishersk (the district's administrative centre) by road. Bychina is the nearest rural locality.
