= Rategova =

Rategova Ратегова
- Village
- Location within Perm Krai Location within Russia
- Coordinates: 60°10′N 56°36′E
- Country: Russia
- Region: Perm Krai
- District: Krasnovishersky District
- Time zone: UTC+5:00

Rategova (Russian: Ратегова) is a rural locality (a village) in Krasnovishersky District, Perm Krai, Russia. The population was 2 as of 2010. There are 2 streets.

== Geography ==
Rategova is located 41 km southwest of Krasnovishersk (the district's administrative centre) by road. Gubdor is the nearest rural locality.
