= Krasnovishersky =

Krasnovishersky (masculine), Krasnovisherskaya (feminine), or Krasnovisherskoye (neuter) may refer to:

- Krasnovishersky District, a district of Perm Krai, Russia
- Krasnovisherskoye Urban Settlement, a municipal formation which the town of Krasnovishersk and five rural localities in Krasnovishersky District of Perm Krai, Russia are incorporated as
