= Bychina =

Bychina Бычина
- Village
- Location within Perm Krai Location within Russia
- Coordinates: 60°08′N 57°17′E
- Country: Russia
- Region: Perm Krai
- District: Krasnovishersky District
- Time zone: UTC+5:00

Bychina (Russian: Бычина) is a rural locality (a village) in Krasnovishersky District, Perm Krai, Russia. The population was 178 as of 2010. There are 4 streets.

== Geography ==
Bychina is located 35 km southeast of Krasnovishersk (the district's administrative centre) by road. Nizhnyaya Bychina is the nearest rural locality.

== the weather ==
This region has cold and long winters and short and moderate summers. Agriculture and animal husbandry have adapted to these climatic conditions.
