= Danilov Lug =

Danilov Lug Данилов Луг
- Settlement
- Location within Perm Krai Location within Russia
- Coordinates: 60°21′N 56°46′E
- Country: Russia
- Region: Perm Krai
- District: Krasnovishersky District
- Time zone: UTC+5:00

Danilov Lug (Russian: Данилов Луг) is a rural locality (a settlement) in Krasnovishersky District, Perm Krai, Russia. The population was 228 as of 2010. There are 5 streets.

== Geography ==
Danilov Lug is located 36 km southwest of Krasnovishersk (the district's administrative centre) by road. Ust-Yazva is the nearest rural locality.
