= Berezovaya Staritsa =

Berezovaya Staritsa Березовая Старица
- Settlement
- Location within Perm Krai Location within Russia
- Coordinates: 60°14′N 56°35′E
- Country: Russia
- Region: Perm Krai
- District: Krasnovishersky District
- Time zone: UTC+5:00

Berezovaya Staritsa (Russian: Березовая Старица) is a rural locality (a settlement) in Krasnovishersky District, Perm Krai, Russia. The population was 168 as of 2010. There are 4 streets.

== Geography ==
Berezovaya Staritsa is located 43 km southwest of Krasnovishersk (the district's administrative centre) by road. Bulatovo is the nearest rural locality.
