= Verkh-Yazva =

Verkh-Yazva Верх-Язьва
- Selo
- Location within Perm Krai Location within Russia
- Coordinates: 60°06′N 57°26′E
- Country: Russia
- Region: Perm Krai
- District: Krasnovishersky District
- Time zone: UTC+5:00

Verkh-Yazva (Russian: Верх-Язьва) is a rural locality (a selo) and the administrative center of Verkh-Yazvinskoye Rural Settlement, Krasnovishersky District, Perm Krai, Russia. The population was 868 as of 2010. There are 18 streets.

== Geography ==
Verkh-Yazva is located 47 km southeast of Krasnovishersk (the district's administrative centre) by road. Grishina is the nearest rural locality.
