= Mutikha =

Mutikha Мутиха
- Settlement
- Location within Perm Krai Location within Russia
- Coordinates: 60°26′N 57°59′E
- Country: Russia
- Region: Perm Krai
- District: Krasnovishersky District
- Time zone: UTC+5:00

Mutikha (Russian: Мутиха) is a rural locality (a settlement) in Krasnovishersky District, Perm Krai, Russia. The population was 147 as of 2010. There are 6 streets.

== Geography ==
Mutikha is located 60 km east of Krasnovishersk (the district's administrative centre) by road. Akchim is the nearest rural locality.
