= Glukhaya Vilva =

Location
- Country: Russia

Physical characteristics
- Source
  - location: Solikamsky District, Perm Krai
- Mouth: Yazva
  - coordinates: 60°11′16″N 56°59′35″E
- Length: 234 km (145 mi)
- Basin size: 1,740 km^{2} (670 sq mi)

Basin features
- Progression: Yazva→ Vishera→ Kama→ Volga→ Caspian Sea

The Glukhaya Vilva (Russian: Глухая Вильва) is a river in Perm Krai, Russia, a left tributary of the Yazva. It is 234 kilometres (145 mi) long, and its drainage basin covers 1,740 square kilometres (670 mi^{2}). It starts to the north of the uninhabited village of Talaya and flows through Solikamsky and Krasnovishersky districts. Its mouth is upstream of the settlement Kotomysh. There are many swamps near the river.

Main tributaries:

- Left: Tala, Bolshoy Kyrog, Bolshoy Surmog, Maly Surmog, Bolshaya Mysya;
- Right: Bolshoy Durakom, Bolshoy Sim, Dolgaya.
