= Boloto =

Boloto Болото
- Village
- Location within Perm Krai Location within Russia
- Coordinates: 60°01′N 57°33′E
- Country: Russia
- Region: Perm Krai
- District: Krasnovishersky District
- Time zone: UTC+5:00

Boloto (Russian: Болото) is a rural locality (a village) in Krasnovishersky District, Perm Krai, Russia. The population was 1 as of 2010.

== Geography ==
Boloto is located 59 km southeast of Krasnovishersk (the district's administrative centre) by road. Antipina is the nearest rural locality.
