= Ivachina =

Ivachina Ивачина
- Village
- Location within Perm Krai Location within Russia
- Coordinates: 60°11′N 57°14′E
- Country: Russia
- Region: Perm Krai
- District: Krasnovishersky District
- Time zone: UTC+5:00

Ivachina (Russian: Ивачина) is a rural locality (a village) in Krasnovishersky District, Perm Krai, Russia. The population was 12 as of 2010. There is 1 street.

== Geography ==
Ivachina is located 30 km south of Krasnovishersk (the district's administrative centre) by road. Bychina is the nearest rural locality.
