= Vels (settlement) =

Vels Велс
- Settlement
- Location within Perm Krai Location within Russia
- Coordinates: 60°44′N 58°46′E
- Country: Russia
- Region: Perm Krai
- District: Krasnovishersky District
- Time zone: UTC+5:00

Vels (Russian: Велс) is a rural locality (a settlement) in Krasnovishersky District, Perm Krai, Russia. The population was 198 as of 2010. There are 9 streets.

== Geography ==
Vels is located 142 km northeast of Krasnovishersk (the district's administrative centre) by road. Vaya is the nearest rural locality.
