= Parshakova =

Parshakova (Russian: Палева) is the name of several rural localities in Russia:

- Parshakova, Krasnovishersky District, Perm Krai, a village in Krasnovishersky District, Perm Krai
- Parshakova, Kudymkarsky District, Perm Krai, a village in Kudymkarsky District, Perm Krai
