= Posmak =

River in Perm Krai, Russia

Physical characteristics
- Mouth
  - location: Vels
- Length: 29 km (18 mi)

Basin features
- Progression: Vels→ Vishera→ Kama→ Volga→ Caspian Sea

The Posmak (Russian: Посьмак) is a river in Perm Krai, Russia, a left tributary of the Vels, which in turn is a tributary of the Vishera. The river is 29 kilometres (18 mi) long.
