= Yamzhach =

River in Perm Krai, Russia

Location
- Country: Russia

Physical characteristics
- Mouth: Kolva
  - coordinates: 61°17′20″N 58°15′06″E
- Length: 34 km (21 mi)

Basin features
- Progression: Kolva→ Vishera→ Kama→ Volga→ Caspian Sea

Yamzhach (Russian: Ямжач) is a river in Perm Krai, Russia, a left tributary of the Kolva, which in turn is a tributary of the Vishera. The river is 34 kilometres (21 mi) long. It flows into the Kolva 380 kilometres (240 mi) from the Kolva's mouth. The main tributaries are the Passavozh (left) and Zapadnaya (left) rivers.
