= Chudin =

Chudin (Russian: Чудин, from чудо meaning miracle) is a Russian masculine surname, its feminine counterpart is Chudina. It may refer to

- Aleksandra Chudina (1923–1990), Soviet athlete
- Ivan Chudin (born 1990), Russian football player
- Sergei Chudin (born 1973), Russian football player

== See also ==
- Chudov (surname)
