= Myka (river) =

- Location within Perm Krai Location within Russia

Location
- Country: Russia

Physical characteristics
- Mouth: Uls
  - coordinates: 60°23′56″N 58°46′59″E
- Length: 18 km (11 mi)

Basin features
- Progression: Uls→ Vishera→ Kama→ Volga→ Caspian Sea

The Myka (Russian: Мыка) is a river in Perm Krai, Russia, a right tributary of the Uls, which in turn is a tributary of the Vishera. The river is 18 kilometres (11 mi) long. It flows into the Uls 27 kilometres (17 mi) from the larger river's mouth.
