= Parshakova, Krasnovishersky District, Perm Krai =

Parshakova Паршакова
- Village
- Location within Perm Krai Location within Russia
- Coordinates: 60°02′N 57°30′E
- Country: Russia
- Region: Perm Krai
- District: Krasnovishersky District
- Time zone: UTC+5:00

Parshakova (Russian: Паршакова) is a rural locality (a village) in Krasnovishersky District, Perm Krai, Russia. The population was 144 as of 2010. There are 5 streets.

== Geography ==
Parshakova is located 55 km southeast of Krasnovishersk (the district's administrative centre) by road. Arefina is the nearest rural locality.
