= Ulvich =

River in Perm Krai, Russia

Physical characteristics
- Source
  - location: Kvarkush
- Mouth: Yayva
  - coordinates: 59.5655°N 57.6896°E
- Length: 72 km (45 mi)
- Basin size: 401 km^{2} (155 sq mi)

Basin features
- Progression: Yayva→ Kama→ Volga→ Caspian Sea

The Ulvich (Russian: Ульвич) is a river in Perm Krai, Russia, a right tributary of the Yayva. It is 72 kilometres (45 mi) long, and its drainage basin covers 401 square kilometres (155 mi^{2}). It starts on the west slope of the Kvarkush mountain range. Its mouth is downstream of the village Sukhaya, 207 kilometres (129 mi) from the mouth of the Yayva River. There are some small tributaries.

== Etymology ==
The most believable version of the origin of the river's name is that it is a composition of the words ‘ul’ (‘wet’ in Mansi language) and ‘vich’ (‘branch’ from Russian ‘vichka’), so it can be translated as ‘wet branch’. Also, it is may be from the word ‘vidz’ (meadow), in which case Ulvich means ‘wet meadow’.

== Sources ==
- Пермская область. Коми-Пермяцкий автономный округ: общегеогр. регион. атлас: сост. по состоянию на 1985-1997 гг.: масштаб 1:200000 : планы городов: Перми (1:50000), Кудымкара (1:20000) / ЦЭВКФ; ред. Ю. Кузнецов, Д. Трушин. 1-е изд. М.: ВТУ ГШ, 2000. 128 с.
- Ресурсы поверхностных вод СССР. Гидрологическая изученность. Т. 2: Средний Урал и Приуралье. Вып. 1: Кама / под ред. В. В. Николаенко. Л.: Гидрометеоиздат, 1966. 324 с., С. 70
