= Ukhtym =

Location
- Country: Russia

Physical characteristics
- Mouth: Kolva
  - coordinates: 60.7874°N 56.6848°E
- Length: 51 km (32 mi)
- Basin size: 175 km^{2} (68 sq mi)

Basin features
- Progression: Kolva→ Vishera→ Kama→ Volga→ Caspian Sea

The Ukhtym (Russian: Ухтым) is a river in Perm Krai, Russia, a left tributary of the Kolva, which in turn is a tributary of the Vishera. The river is 51 kilometres (32 mi) long, and its drainage basin covers 175 square kilometres (68 mi^{2}). It flows into the Kolva 104 kilometres (65 mi) from Kolva's mouth.
