= Mudyl =

River in Perm Krai, Russia

Location
- Country: Russia

Physical characteristics
- Mouth
  - location: Kolva
- Length: 33 km (21 mi)

Basin features
- Progression: Kolva→ Vishera→ Kama→ Volga→ Caspian Sea

The Mudyl (Russian: Мудыль) is a river in Perm Krai, Russia, a left tributary of the Kolva, which in turn is a tributary of the Vishera. The river is 33 kilometres (21 mi) long. It flows into the Kolva 20 kilometres (12 mi) from Kolva's mouth.
