= Nyariz =

Location
- Country: Russia

Physical characteristics
- Mouth
  - location: Kolva
- Length: 28 km (17 mi)

Basin features
- Progression: Kolva→ Vishera→ Kama→ Volga→ Caspian Sea

The Nyariz (Russian: Няризь) is a river in Perm Krai, Russia, a right tributary of the Kolva, which in turn is a tributary of the Vishera. The river is 28 kilometres (17 mi) long. It flows into the Kolva 366 kilometres (227 mi) from Kolva's mouth.
