= Moyva =

Location
- Country: Russia

Physical characteristics
- Mouth: Vishera
  - coordinates: 61.3193°N 58.8754°E
- Length: 51 km (32 mi)
- Basin size: 593 km^{2} (229 sq mi)

Basin features
- Progression: Vishera→ Kama→ Volga→ Caspian Sea

The Moyva (Russian: Мойва) is a river in Perm Krai, Russia, a left tributary of the Vishera. It is 51 kilometres (32 mi) long, and its drainage basin covers 593 square kilometres (229 mi^{2}). It starts on the south slope of Mount Isherim and flows through Krasnovishersky District. It is a mountain river with rapid flow.
