= Kumay =

Location
- Country: Russia

Physical characteristics
- Mouth: Kolva
  - coordinates: 61°23′24″N 57°54′55″E
- Length: 23 km (14 mi)

Basin features
- Progression: Kolva→ Vishera→ Kama→ Volga→ Caspian Sea

The Kumay (Russian: Кумай) is a river in Perm Krai, Russia, a left tributary of the Kolva, which in turn is a tributary of the Vishera. The length of the river is 23 kilometers (14 mi). It flows into the Kolva at the point located 326 kilometers (203 mi) away from the Kolva's mouth.
