= Bolshaya Lyampa =

River in Perm Krai, Russia

Location
- Country: Russia

Physical characteristics
- Mouth
  - location: Uls
- Length: 34 km (21 mi)

Basin features
- Progression: Uls→ Vishera→ Kama→ Volga→ Caspian Sea

The Bolshaya Lyampa (Russian: Большая Лямпа) is a river in Perm Krai, Russia, a right tributary of the Uls which in turn is a tributary of the Vishera. The river is 34 kilometres (21 mi) long. Its source is near the border with Sverdlovsk Oblast. It flows into the Uls 55 kilometres (34 mi) from the larger river's mouth. The Bolshaya Lyampa's main tributary is the Malaya Lyampa.
