= Bolshaya Martayka =

River in Perm Krai, Russia

Physical characteristics
- Mouth
  - location: Vels
- Length: 18 km (11 mi)

Basin features
- Progression: Vels→ Vishera→ Kama→ Volga→ Caspian Sea

The Bolshaya Martayka (Russian: Большая Мартайка) is a river in Perm Krai, Russia, a left tributary of Vels which in turn is a tributary of Vishera. The river is 18 kilometres (11 mi) long. Its source is near the border with Sverdlovsk Oblast, and it flows through the Vishersky Nature Reserve.
