= Pelya =

Location
- Country: Russia

Physical characteristics
- Mouth
  - location: Uls
- Length: 24 km (15 mi)

Basin features
- Progression: Uls→ Vishera→ Kama→ Volga→ Caspian Sea

The Pelya (Russian: Пеля) is a river in Perm Krai, Russia, a left tributary of the Uls, which in turn is a tributary of the Vishera. The river is 24 kilometres (15 mi) long. It flows into the Uls 16 kilometres (10 mi) from the larger river's mouth. The main tributary is the Rassokha (right).
