= Pisanka =

Pisanka may refer to:

- Pisanka (Polish), richly ornamented decorated chicken, goose, or duck eggs
- Pisanka (river), a river in Perm Krai, Russia, tributary to Vishera

== See also ==
- Pysanka
