= Sukhotyl =

Coordinates: 61°26′12″N 57°43′02″E

Location
- Country: Russia

Physical characteristics
- Mouth
  - location: Kolva
- Length: 20 km (12 mi)

Basin features
- Progression: Kolva→ Vishera→ Kama→ Volga→ Caspian Sea

The Sukhotyl (Russian: Сухотыль) is a river in Perm Krai and the Komi Republic, Russia, a right tributary of the Kolva, which in turn is a tributary of the Vishera. The river is 20 kilometres (12 mi) long. It starts in the Komi Republic, near the border with Perm Krai and flows into the Kolva 302 kilometres (188 mi) from Kolva's mouth.
