= Lyzovka =

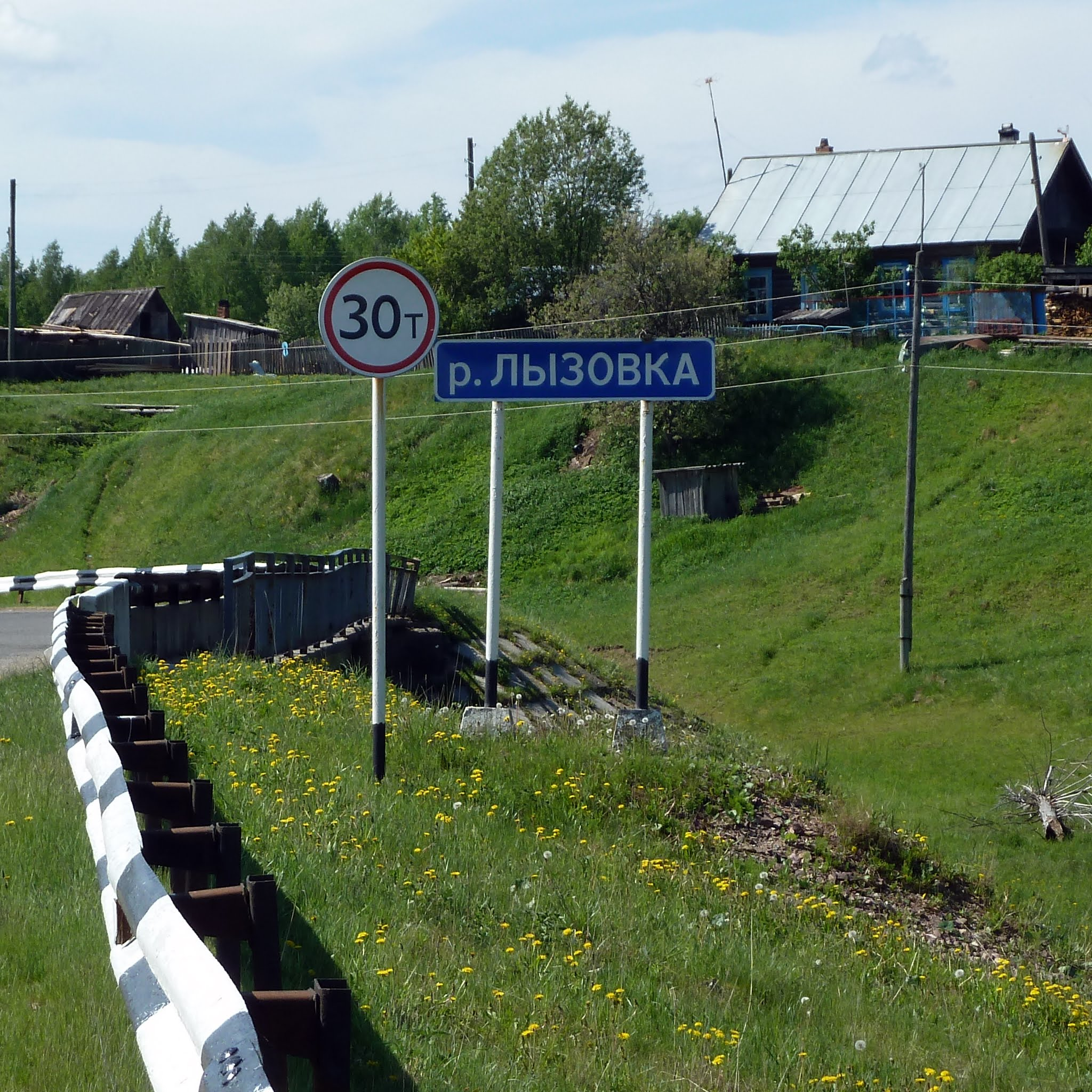

Location
- Country: Russia

Physical characteristics
- Mouth: Kolva
  - coordinates: 60.5071°N 56.4299°E
- Length: 52 km (32 mi)
- Basin size: 257 km^{2} (99 sq mi)

Basin features
- Progression: Kolva→ Vishera→ Kama→ Volga→ Caspian Sea

The Lyzovka (Russian: Лызовка) is a river in Perm Krai, Russia, a right tributary of the Kolva, which in turn is a tributary of the Vishera. The river is 52 kilometres (32 mi) long, and the area of its drainage basin is 257 square kilometres (99 mi^{2}). The Lyzovka flows into the Kolva 25 kilometres (16 mi) from Kolva's mouth.
