= Seleya =

River in Perm Krai, Russia

Location
- Country: Russia

Physical characteristics
- Mouth: Kolva
  - coordinates: 61°20′22″N 58°04′48″E
- Length: 20 km (12 mi)

Basin features
- Progression: Kolva→ Vishera→ Kama→ Volga→ Caspian Sea

The Seleya (Russian: Селея) is a river in Perm Krai, Russia, a left tributary of the Kolva, which in turn is a tributary of the Vishera. The river is 20 kilometres (12 mi) long. It flows into the Kolva 351 kilometres (218 mi) from the Kolva's mouth.
