= Ayya (river) =

River in Perm Krai, Russia

Location
- Country: Russia

Physical characteristics
- Mouth
  - location: Kolva
  - coordinates: 61°19′3″N 57°17′44″E
- Length: 19 km (12 mi)

Basin features
- Progression: Kolva→ Vishera→ Kama→ Volga→ Caspian Sea

The Ayya (Russian: Айя) is a river in Perm Krai, Russia, a left tributary of Kolva which in turn is a tributary of Vishera. The river is 19 kilometres (12 mi) long. It flows into the Kolva at a point 246 kilometres (153 mi) from Kolva's mouth.
