= Anyl =

Location
- Country: Russia

Physical characteristics
- Mouth
  - location: Kolva
  - coordinates: 61°23′40″N 57°26′19″E
- Length: 25 km (16 mi)

Basin features
- Progression: Kolva→ Vishera→ Kama→ Volga→ Caspian Sea

The Anyl (Russian: Аныль) is a river in Perm Krai and Komi Republic, Russia, a right tributary of Kolva which in turn is a tributary of Vishera. The river is 25 kilometres (16 mi) long. It starts in Komi Republic, near the border with Perm Krai. Its mouth is 269 kilometres (167 mi) from Kolva's mouth. Main tributaries are the Izkaraush (left) and Payvozh (right).
