= Beryozovaya =

River in Perm Krai, Russia

Location
- Country: Russia

Physical characteristics
- Source
  - location: North Ural
- Mouth: Kolva
  - coordinates: 61°00′52″N 57°08′37″E
- Length: 208 km (129 mi)
- Basin size: 3,610 km^{2} (1,390 sq mi)

Basin features
- Progression: Kolva→ Vishera→ Kama→ Volga→ Caspian Sea

The Beryozovaya (Russian: Берёзовая) is a river in Perm Krai, Russia, a left tributary of the Kolva. It is 208 kilometres (129 mi) in length and has a drainage basin covering 3,610 square kilometres (1,390 mi^{2}). It starts on slopes of mountain range Beryozovy Kamen and flows through Cherdynsky District. Its mouth is downstream of the village Korepino. There are many rocks and limestone formations along its banks.

Main tributaries:

- Left: Zhernovka;
- Right: Byrkim, Vizhay, Buzhuy, Kremennaya, Nemyd.
