= KAD =

KAD or Kad may refer to:

- KAD, a Korean Adoptee
- Kathmandu Association of the Deaf
- Kad network, a file sharing network
- Kad (river), a river in Perm Krai, Russia
- Keolis Amey Docklands, joint venture operator of the Docklands Light Railway
