= Surya (river) =

Location
- Country: Russia

Physical characteristics
- Mouth
  - location: Uls
- Length: 21 km (13 mi)

Basin features
- Progression: Uls→ Vishera→ Kama→ Volga→ Caspian Sea

The Surya (Russian: Сурья) is a river in Perm Krai, Russia, a right tributary of the Uls, which in turn is a tributary of the Vishera. The river is 21 kilometres (13 mi) long. It flows into the Uls River 56 kilometres (35 mi) from the larger river's mouth.
