= Nizva =

Location
- Country: Russia

Physical characteristics
- Mouth: Kolva
  - coordinates: 60.6237°N 56.4381°E
- Length: 71 km (44 mi)
- Basin size: 590 km^{2} (230 sq mi)

Basin features
- Progression: Kolva→ Vishera→ Kama→ Volga→ Caspian Sea

The Nizva (Russian: Низьва) is a river in Perm Krai, Russia, a left tributary of the Kolva, which in turn is a tributary of the Vishera. The Nizva is 71 kilometres (44 mi) long, and its drainage basin covers 590 square kilometres (230 mi^{2}). It flows into the Kolva 51 kilometres (32 mi) from the Kolva's mouth. The main tributaries are Baydach (left) and Vyrya (right).
