= Yazva =

River in Perm Krai, Russia

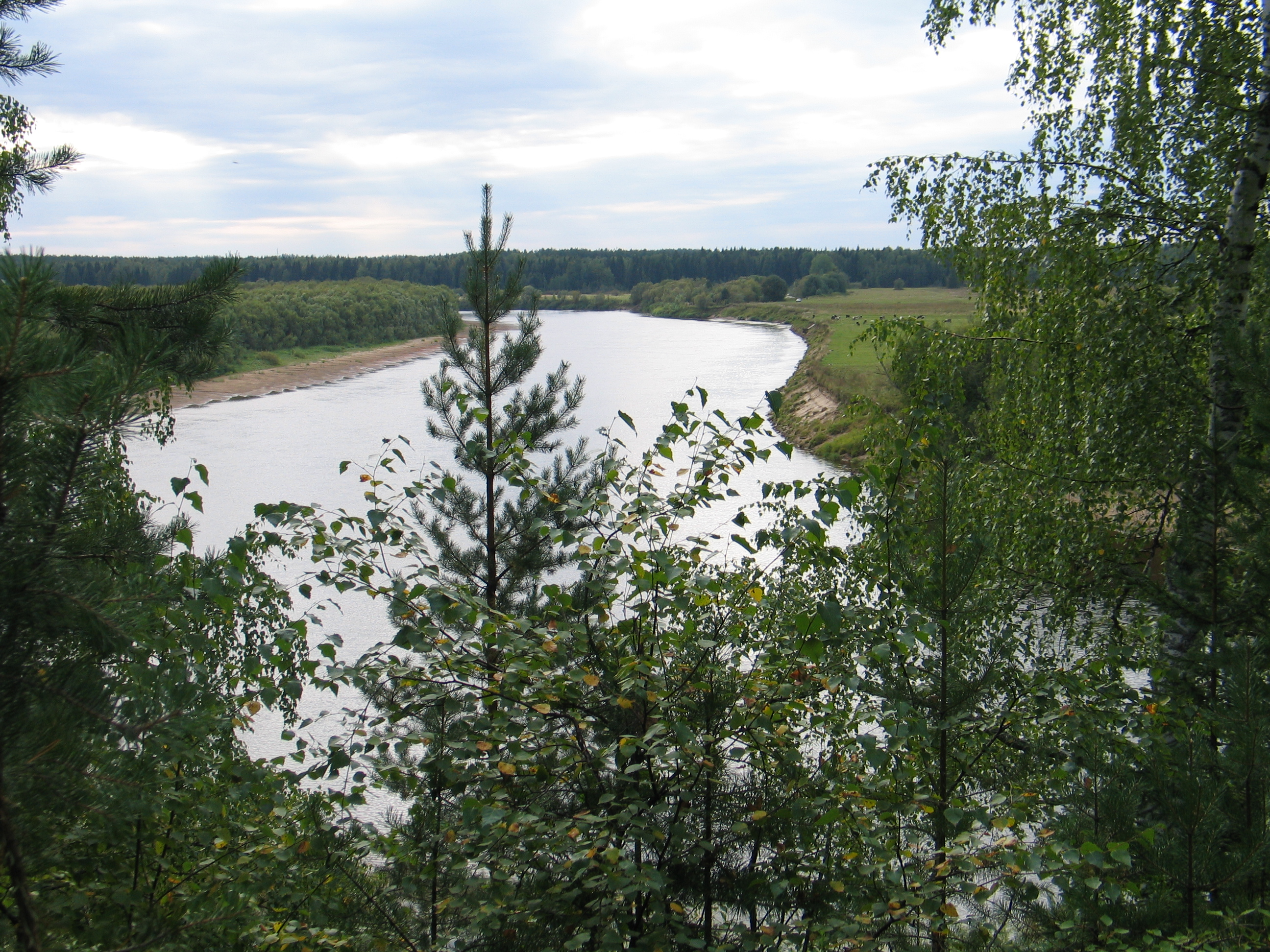

Location
- Country: Russia

Physical characteristics
- Mouth: Vishera
  - coordinates: 60°21′25″N 56°48′40″E
- Length: 162 km (101 mi)
- Basin size: 5,900 km^{2} (2,300 sq mi)

Basin features
- Progression: Vishera→ Kama→ Volga→ Caspian Sea

The Yazva (Russian: Я́зьва; Komi: Ёдз, Yodz) is a river in Perm Krai, Russia. It is a left tributary of the Vishera. It flows through the south part of the Krasnovishersky District and enters the Vishera downstream of the town of Krasnovishersk, 73 kilometres (45 mi) from its confluence with the Kama. The Yazva is 162 kilometres (101 mi) long, and its drainage basin covers 5,900 square kilometres (2,300 mi^{2}). Traditionally, Komi-Yazva, a Finno-Ugric language, has been spoken in the river basin.

== Tributaries ==
The main tributaries of the Yazva are, from source to mouth:

- Left: Molmys, Mel, Glukhaya Vilva, Kolynva
- Right: Kolchim
