= Bolshaya Zolotanka =

Location
- Country: Russia

Physical characteristics
- Mouth
  - location: Uls
- Length: 19 km (12 mi)

Basin features
- Progression: Uls→ Vishera→ Kama→ Volga→ Caspian Sea

The Bolshaya Zolotanka (Russian: Большая Золотанка) is a river in Perm Krai, Russia, a left tributary of the Uls which in turn is a tributary of the Vishera. The river is 19 kilometres (12 mi) long. It flows into the Uls 11 kilometres (7 mi) from the larger river's mouth.
