= Tulpan (river) =

Location
- Country: Russia

Physical characteristics
- Mouth: Kolva
  - coordinates: 61°21′06″N 57°24′46″E
- Length: 42 km (26 mi)

Basin features
- Progression: Kolva→ Vishera→ Kama→ Volga→ Caspian Sea

The Tulpan (Russian: Тулпан) is a river in Perm Krai, Russia, a left tributary of the Kolva, which in turn is a tributary of the Vishera. The river is 42 kilometres (26 mi) long. It flows into the Kolva 262 kilometres (163 mi) from the Kolva's mouth. The main tributary is the Bolshoy Vadyvash (left).
