= Zagovorukha =

Zagovorukha Заговоруха
- Village
- Location within Perm Krai Location within Russia
- Coordinates: 60°29′N 57°17′E
- Country: Russia
- Region: Perm Krai
- District: Krasnovishersky District
- Time zone: UTC+5:00

Zagovorukha (Russian: Заговоруха) is a rural locality (a village) in Krasnovishersky District, Perm Krai, Russia. The population was 81 as of 2010. There are 3 streets.

== Geography ==
Zagovorukha is located 23 km northeast of Krasnovishersk (the district's administrative centre) by road. Visherogorsk is the nearest rural locality.
