= Jacksonia arida =

Scientific classification
- Kingdom: Plantae
- Clade: Tracheophytes
- Clade: Angiosperms
- Clade: Eudicots
- Clade: Rosids
- Order: Fabales
- Family: Fabaceae
- Subfamily: Faboideae
- Genus: Jacksonia
- Species: J. arida

Binomial name
- Jacksonia arida Chappill

Species of legume

Jacksonia arida is a species of flowering plant in the family Fabaceae and is endemic to Western Australia. It is an erect or prostrate shrub with tangled branches, sharply-pointed branchlets, yellow-orange to orange flowers, and woody pods.

== Description ==
Jacksonia arida is an erect or prostrate shrub with tangled branches that typically grows up to 0.2–2.2 m (7.9 in – 7 ft 2.6 in) high and 1–2 m (3 ft 3 in – 6 ft 7 in) wide, its branches greyish-green. Its end-branches are sharply pointed and scattered along the main branches, 3.4–82 mm (0.13–3.23 in) long and 0.5–2.5 mm (0.020–0.098 in) wide. The leaves are reduced to dark brown, egg-shaped scales, that fall off early, 0.9–2.3 mm (0.035–0.091 in) long and 0.7–1.9 mm (0.028–0.075 in) wide. The flowers are scattered along branches and sharply-pointed branchlets on a pedicel 3.7–5.1 mm (0.15–0.20 in) long. There are narrowly egg-shaped bracteoles 0.8–1.8 mm (0.031–0.071 in) long and 0.4–0.8 mm (0.016–0.031 in) wide on the pedicels. The floral tube is 1.3–1.4 mm (0.051–0.055 in) long and the sepals are membranous, the lobes 7.5–12.1 mm (0.30–0.48 in) long, 1.6–2.0 mm (0.063–0.079 in) wide and fused at the base. The standard petal is yellow-orange to orange with red marking near the base, 7.6–8.7 mm (0.30–0.34 in) long, the wings yellow-orange to orange with red marking, 7.8–8.3 mm (0.31–0.33 in) long, and the keel orange-red to red, 7.6–8 mm (0.30–0.31 in) long. The stamens have pink filaments 7.2–10.4 mm (0.28–0.41 in) long. Flowering occurs from March to December, and the fruit is a woody, elliptic pod, 6.8–7.5 mm (0.27–0.30 in) long and 3.5 mm (0.14 in) wide.

== Taxonomy ==
Jacksonia arida was first formally described in 2007 by Jennifer Anne Chappill in Australian Systematic Botany from specimens collected 18 mi (29 km) east Yelma in 1958. The specific epithet (arida) means 'dry' or 'withered', referring to the habitat.

== Distribution and habitat ==
This species of Jacksonia grows in open shrubland on sand dunes between Mullewa, Carnegie Homestead, Neale Junction and Norseman in the Avon Wheatbelt, Coolgardie, Gascoyne, Geraldton Sandplains, Great Victoria Desert, Murchison and Yalgoo bioregions of Western Australia.

== Conservation status ==
Jacksonia arida is listed as "not threatened" by the Government of Western Australia, Department of Biodiversity, Conservation and Attractions.
