= Kutim =

Location
- Country: Russia

Physical characteristics
- Mouth: Uls
  - coordinates: 60.2381°N 58.8881°E
- Length: 55 km (34 mi)
- Basin size: 568 km^{2} (219 sq mi)

Basin features
- Progression: Uls→ Vishera→ Kama→ Volga→ Caspian Sea

The Kutim (Russian: Кутим) is a river in Perm Krai, Russia, a right tributary of the Uls, which in turn is a tributary of the Vishera. The river is 55 kilometres (34 mi) long, and the area of its drainage basin is 568 square kilometres (219 mi^{2}). The source of the river is located near the border with Sverdlovsk Oblast. Main tributaries: Bolshaya Surya, Sredny Kutim, Lyampa Kutimskaya (left).
