= Nyuzim =

Location
- Country: Russia

Physical characteristics
- Mouth: Kolva
  - coordinates: 61°23′48″N 57°30′19″E
- Length: 21 km (13 mi)

Basin features
- Progression: Kolva→ Vishera→ Kama→ Volga→ Caspian Sea

The Nyuzim (Russian: Нюзим) is a river in Perm Krai and Komi Republic, Russia, a right tributary of the Kolva, which in turn is a tributary of the Vishera. The river is 21 kilometres (13 mi) long. It starts in the Komi Republic, near the border with Perm Krai. Its mouth is 277 kilometres (172 mi) from Kolva's mouth, east of the rural locality of Nyuzim.
