= Chural =

River in Perm Krai, Russia

Physical characteristics
- Source
  - elevation: 432 m (1,417 ft)
- Mouth
  - location: Vels
  - coordinates: 60°42′31″N 59°6′37″E
- Length: 25 km (16 mi)

Basin features
- Progression: Vels→ Vishera→ Kama→ Volga→ Caspian Sea

The Chural (Russian: Чурал) is a river in Perm Krai, Russia, a left tributary of the Vels, which in turn is a tributary of the Vishera. The river is 25 kilometres (16 mi) long. The main tributary is the Pravaya Rassokha (right). The Chural River originates in the spurs of the Northern Urals in the pass between the mountains of Big Shudya (883 m) and Shudya-Pendysh (1050 m), 23 km to the south-east of the village of Wells. The river flows first to the northeast, then north, flowing through the valley between the mountains Churol (773 m), and White Stone (1085 m). The width of the river at its mouth is about 30 meters, with a flow velocity of about 0.8 m/s).
