= Bubyl =

Location
- Country: Russia

Physical characteristics
- Mouth: Kolva
  - coordinates: 60°44′13″N 56°32′30″E
- Length: 60 km (37 mi)
- Basin size: 266 km^{2} (103 sq mi)

Basin features
- Progression: Kolva→ Vishera→ Kama→ Volga→ Caspian Sea

The Bubyl (Russian: Бубыл) is a river in Perm Krai, Russia, a right tributary of the Kolva, which in turn is a tributary of the Vishera. The river is 60 kilometres (37 mi) long, and its drainage basin covers 266 square kilometres (103 mi^{2}). The Bubyl flows into the Kolva 100 kilometres (62 mi) upstream of the Kolva's mouth.
