= Vizhaikha (Kolva) =

River in Perm Krai, Russia

Location
- Country: Russia

Physical characteristics
- Mouth
  - location: Kolva
  - coordinates: 59.759°N 56.195°E
- Length: 94 km (58 mi)
- Basin size: 375 km^{2} (145 sq mi)

Basin features
- Progression: Kolva→ Vishera→ Kama→ Volga→ Caspian Sea

The Vizhaikha (Russian: Вижаиха) is a river in Perm Krai, Russia, a right tributary of the Kolva, which in turn is a tributary of the Vishera. The river is 94 kilometres (58 mi) long, and its drainage basin covers 375 square kilometres (145 mi^{2}). Its mouth is 100 kilometres (62 mi) from Kolva's mouth.
