= Lypya =

River in Perm Krai, Russia

Physical characteristics
- Mouth
  - location: Vishera
  - coordinates: 61.161°N 58.7648°E
- Length: 55 km (34 mi)
- Basin size: 273 km^{2} (105 sq mi)

Basin features
- Progression: Vishera→ Kama→ Volga→ Caspian Sea

The Lypya (Russian: Лыпья) is a river in Perm Krai, Russia, a right tributary of the Vishera, which in turn is a tributary of the Kama. The river is 55 kilometres (34 mi) long, and the area of its drainage basin is 273 square kilometres (105 mi^{2}). It starts in the extreme north of the krai, near the border with the Komi Republic, and flows into the Vishera 333 kilometres (207 mi) from the larger river's mouth.
