= Bolshaya Vaya =

River in Perm Krai, Russia

Physical characteristics
- Mouth: Vishera
  - coordinates: 60°36′01″N 58°22′27″E
- Length: 30 km (19 mi)

Basin features
- Progression: Vishera→ Kama→ Volga→ Caspian Sea

The Bolshaya Vaya (Russian: Большая Вая) is a river in Perm Krai, Russia, a right tributary of Vishera which in turn is a tributary of Kama. The river is 30 kilometres (19 mi) long. The mouth of the river is located near the settlement of Vaya.
