= Yayva (river) =

River in Russia

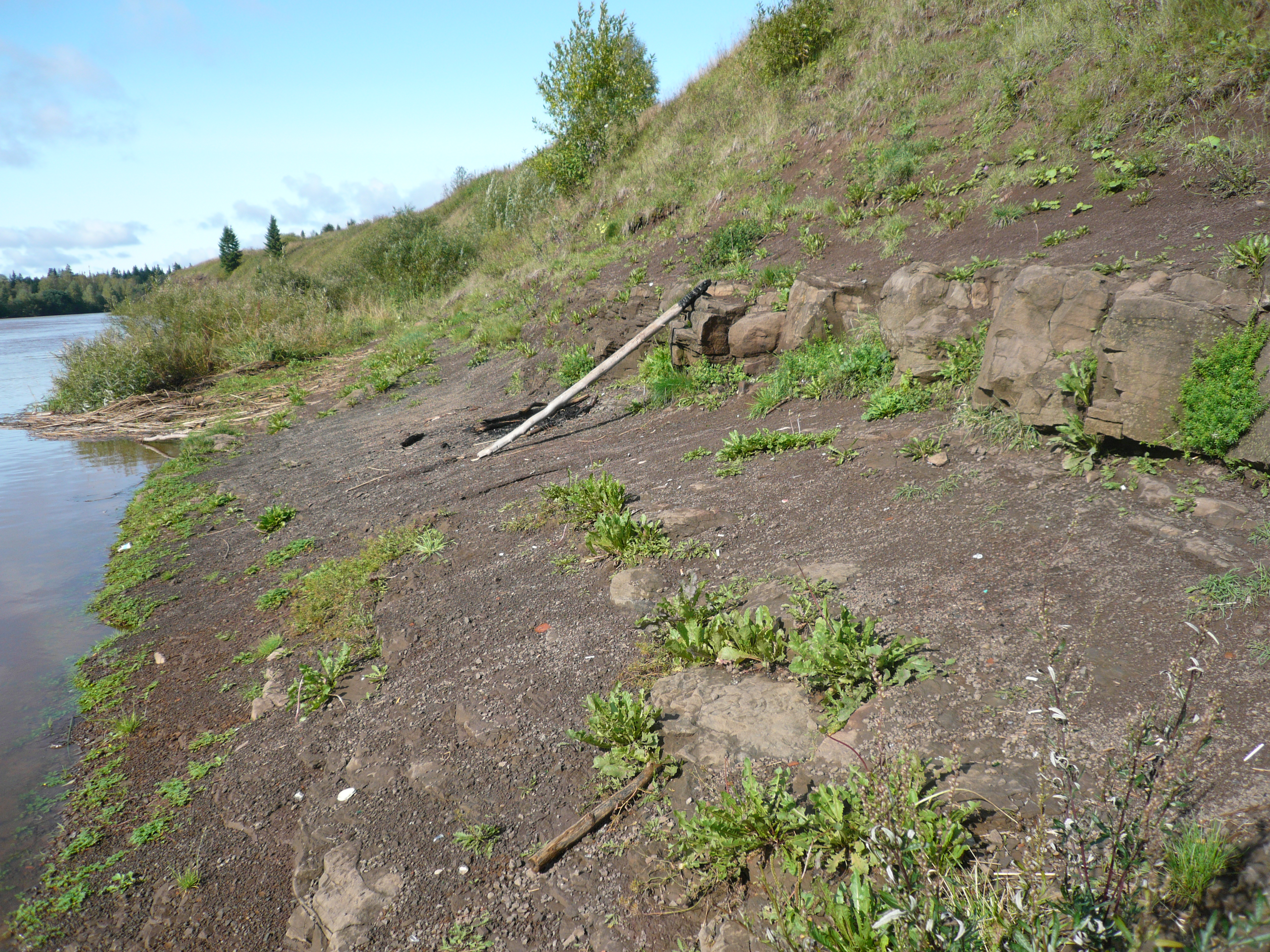

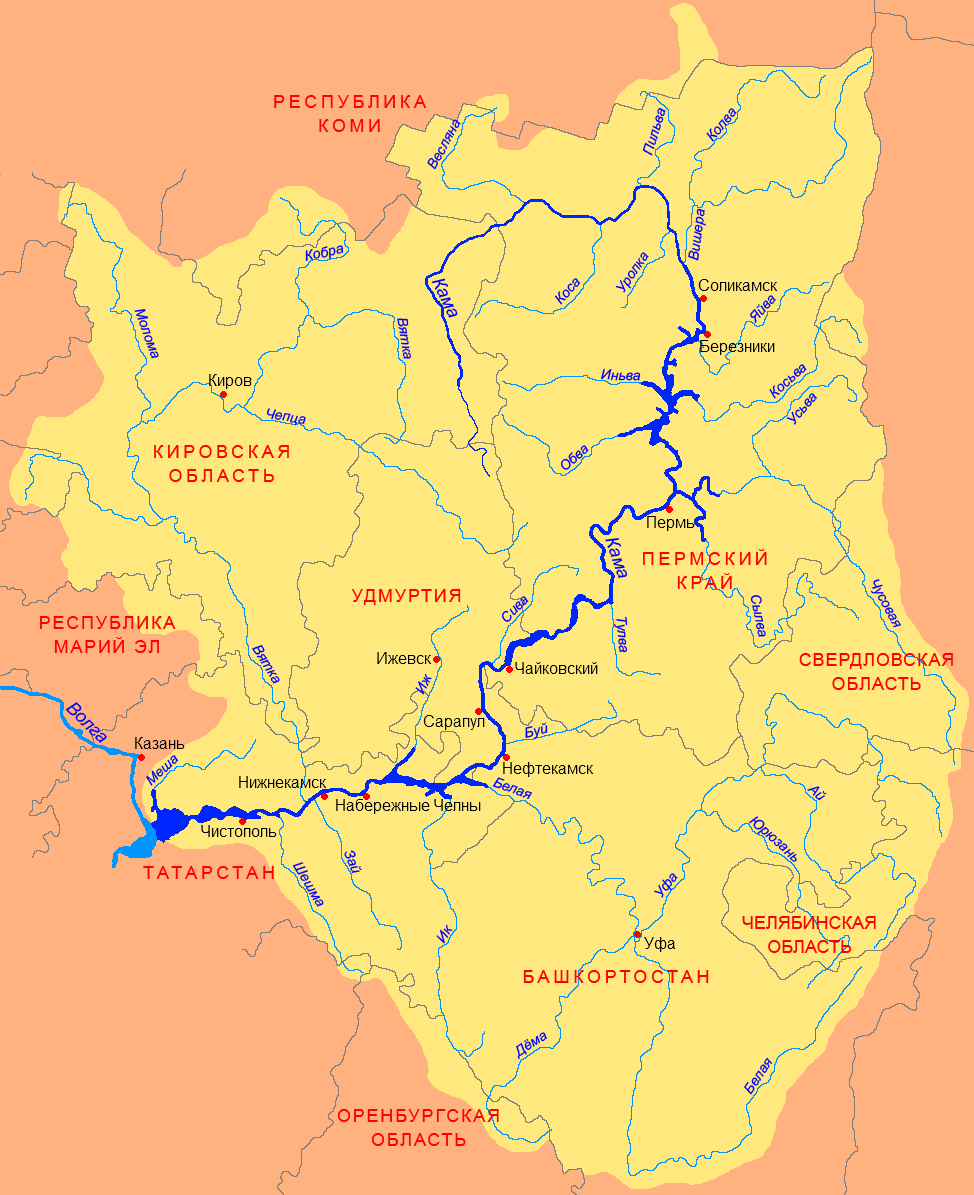
- Scheme of the Kama River Basin.

Physical characteristics
- Source
  - location: North Ural
- Mouth: Kama Reservoir
  - coordinates: 59°19′13″N 56°39′18″E
- Length: 304 km (189 mi)
- Basin size: 6,250 km^{2} (2,410 sq mi)

Basin features
- Progression: Kama Reservoir→ Kama→ Volga→ Caspian Sea

The Yayva (Russian: Яйва) is a river in Perm Krai, Russia, left tributary of the Kama. It is 304 kilometers (189 mi) in length. The area of the basin is 6,250 square kilometers (2,410 sq mi). It starts on south slope of mountain range Kvarkush, 710 m above sea level, near the border with Sverdlovsk Oblast. It flows into Kama Reservoir, lower town Berezniki and opposite of settlement Oryol, forming a bay. It is a mountain river upstream with many rifts and rapids; downstream it is a flat river.

Main tributaries:

- Left: Kad, Chikman, Chanva, Vilva, Usolka;
- Right: Ulvich, Ik.

== Etymology ==
The name of the river is a composition of the Komi-permyak words yay (meat) and va (water), so it can be translated as meat river, in the sense that it is rich with fish and animals. In some documents of the 17th century the river is called Eyva.
