= Chudova =

Location
- Country: Russia

Physical characteristics
- Mouth: Kolva
  - coordinates: 60.3934°N 56.5122°E
- Length: 51 km (32 mi)
- Basin size: 129 km^{2} (50 sq mi)

Basin features
- Progression: Kolva→ Vishera→ Kama→ Volga→ Caspian Sea

The Chudova (Russian: Чудова) is a river in Perm Krai, Russia, a left tributary of Kolva which in turn is a tributary of Vishera. The river is 51 kilometres (32 mi) long, and its drainage basin covers 129 square kilometres (50 mi^{2}). It flows into the Kolva 6.4 kilometres (4.0 mi) from Kolva's mouth, near the town of Cherdyn.
