= Niols =

River in Perm Krai, Russia

Physical characteristics
- Mouth: Vishera
  - coordinates: 61°26′18″N 59°03′42″E
- Length: 26 km (16 mi)

Basin features
- Progression: Vishera→ Kama→ Volga→ Caspian Sea

The Niols (Russian: Ниолс) is a river in Perm Krai, Russia, a left tributary of the Vishera, which in turn is a tributary of the Kama. The river is 26 kilometres (16 mi) long. The source is located on the slope of the Urals, near the border with Sverdlovsk Oblast. It flows through Vishersky Nature Reserve and into the Vishera River 379 kilometres (235 mi) from the larger river's mouth.
