= Vizhaikha (Vishera) =

River in Russia

Physical characteristics
- Mouth: Vishera
  - coordinates: 60.3916°N 57.0111°E
- Length: 64 km (40 mi)
- Basin size: 375 km^{2} (145 sq mi)

Basin features
- Progression: Vishera→ Kama→ Volga→ Caspian Sea

The Vizhaikha (Russian: Вижаиха) is a river in Perm Krai, Russia, a left tributary of the Vishera, which in turn is a tributary of the Kama. The river is 64 kilometres (40 mi) long, and its drainage basin covers 375 square kilometres (145 mi^{2}). Its mouth is located in the town of Krasnovishersk.
