= Visherka =

River in Perm Krai, Russia

Location
- Country: Russia

Physical characteristics
- Source
  - location: North Ural
- Mouth: Kolva
  - coordinates: 60.8737°N 56.8405°E
- Length: 75 km (47 mi)
- Basin size: 3,230 km^{2} (1,250 sq mi)

Basin features
- Progression: Kolva→ Vishera→ Kama→ Volga→ Caspian Sea

The Visherka (Russian: Вишерка) is a river in Perm Krai, Russia, a right tributary of the Kolva. It is 75 kilometres (47 mi) long, and its drainage basin covers 3,230 square kilometres (1,250 mi^{2}). It flows out of Lake Chusovskoye in the north of the Cherdynsky District near its border with the Komi Republic. Its mouth is upstream of the uninhabited village of Bogatyryovo, 124 kilometres (77 mi) from the mouth of the Kolva. Its most significant tributaries are:

- Left: Larevka, Volim;
- Right: Shchugor
