= Chanva =

River in Perm Krai, Russia

Physical characteristics
- Source
  - location: Middle Ural
- Mouth: Yayva
  - coordinates: 59.449°N 57.5563°E
- Length: 70 km (43 mi)
- Basin size: 733 km^{2} (283 sq mi)

Basin features
- Progression: Yayva→ Kama→ Volga→ Caspian Sea

The Chanva (Russian: Чаньва) is a river in Perm Krai, Russia, a left tributary of the Yayva. It is 70 kilometres (43 mi) long. The area of its drainage basin is 733 square kilometres (283 mi^{2}). It begins at the confluence of rivers Tsenva and Rassokha, on the north slope of mountain range Bely Spoy. It is a mountain river with significant changes of elevation between source and mouth. It flows in a deep rocky valley. The mouth is downstream of the settlement Verh-Yayva. The most important of its tributaries, all small, are:

- Left: Kospash, Kostanok, Vetos, Stepanovka;
- Right: Anyusha, Berezovka.

== Sources ==
- Пермская область. Коми-Пермяцкий автономный округ: общегеогр. регион. атлас: сост. по состоянию на 1985-1997 гг.: масштаб 1:200000 : планы городов: Перми (1:50000), Кудымкара (1:20000) / ЦЭВКФ; ред. Ю. Кузнецов, Д. Трушин. 1-е изд. М.: ВТУ ГШ, 2000. 128 с.
- Ресурсы поверхностных вод СССР. Гидрологическая изученность. Т. 2: Средний Урал и Приуралье. Вып. 1: Кама / под ред. В. В. Николаенко. Л.: Гидрометеоиздат, 1966. 324 с., С. 69
