= Lake Chusovskoye =

Lake Chusovskoe
- Location within Perm Krai
- Coordinates: 61.228074°N 56.588536°E
- Primary inflows: Beryozovka River
- Primary outflows: Visherka River
- Basin countries: Russia
- Max. length: 15 km (9.3 mi)
- Surface area: 19.1 km^{2} (7.4 sq mi)
- Max. depth: 8 m (26 ft)

Chusovskoye (Russian: Чусовское) is a lake in Perm Krai, Russia. Area is 19.1 km^{2}. Average depth is 1.5 – 2 m, maximal depth is 8 m. Is stretches from north to south for more than 15 km. It is largest lake in Perm Krai, located in the extreme north of Cherdynsky District, near the border with Komi Republic. There are Visherka River flows out of the lake and Beryozovka River, that flows into the lake in the north.

== Etymology ==
Name of the lake derived from Komi-Permyak word ‘chus’ that means ‘canyon’.
