= Govorukha =

River in Perm Krai, Russia

Physical characteristics
- Mouth: Vishera
  - coordinates: 60.5018°N 57.2753°E
- Length: 55 km (34 mi)
- Basin size: 460 km^{2} (180 sq mi)

Basin features
- Progression: Vishera→ Kama→ Volga→ Caspian Sea

The Govorukha (Russian: Говоруха) is a river in Perm Krai, Russia, a right tributary of the Vishera, which in turn is a tributary of the Kama. The river is 55 kilometres (34 mi) long with a drainage basin of 460 square kilometres (180 mi^{2}). The Govorukha flows into the Vishera 128 kilometres (80 mi) from the Vishera's mouth. The main tributaries are the Vilva and Belaya rivers (both are left).
