= Krasnovishersk Airport =

Krasnovishersk
- IATA: none; ICAO: none

Summary
- Airport type: Public
- Location: Krasnovishersk
- Elevation AMSL: 551 ft / 168 m
- Coordinates: 60°24′36″N 57°8′18″E
- Interactive map of Krasnovishersk

Runways
Direction	Length		Surface
Direction	ft	m	Surface
08/26	3,609	1,100	Asphalt

Krasnovishersk is an airport in Russia located 3 km northeast of Krasnovishersk. It is a small civilian airstrip. The airport has one runway.

== See also ==
- List of airports in Russia
