= Kvarkush =

- Кваркуш
- Location within Russia

Highest point
- Elevation: 1,066 m (3,497 ft)
- Coordinates: 60°12′06″N 58°43′30″E

Geography
- Location: Perm Krai, Russia

Kvarkush (Russian: Кваркуш) is a mountain range in North Ural, in Perm Krai, Russia. It is located in the basin of the Vishera River, between the Uls River and upstream of the Yayva River. Its highland swamps are the source of many rivers and streams. It stretches north–south for about 60 kilometres (37 mi) and is 12 to 15 kilometres (7 to 9 mi) wide.

The highest point is Mount Vogulsky Kamen at 1,066 metres (3,497 ft).

== Etymology ==
The name of the mountain range is derived from the Mansi word kvar-kush that literally means "naked (unforested) Ural". Perhaps, this name was given because there are no forests at elevations of more than 1,000 metres (3,300 ft) and the landscape consists of mountainous tundra and stone deposits. The name of Vogulsky Kamen derives from the name of the Mansi people, formerly called voguly by Russian people.
