= Chikman (river) =

River in Perm Krai, Russia

Physical characteristics
- Source
  - location: North Ural
- Mouth: Yayva
  - coordinates: 59.4998°N 57.589°E
- Length: 55 km (34 mi)
- Basin size: 600 km^{2} (230 sq mi)

Basin features
- Progression: Yayva→ Kama→ Volga→ Caspian Sea

The Chikman (Russian: Чикман) is a river in Perm Krai, Russia, a left tributary of the Yayva. It is 55 kilometres (34 mi) long with a drainage basin of 600 square kilometres (230 mi^{2}). It starts on the west slope of North Ural, north of Mount Sheludyak. Its mouth is upstream of the village Sukhaya, 221 kilometres (137 mi) from the mouth of the Yayva. There are some small tributaries; the most significant are:

- Left: Poludennaya (33 km), Syuz (23 km), Talitsa (18 km);
- Right: Sukhaya
