= Kolva (Perm Krai) =

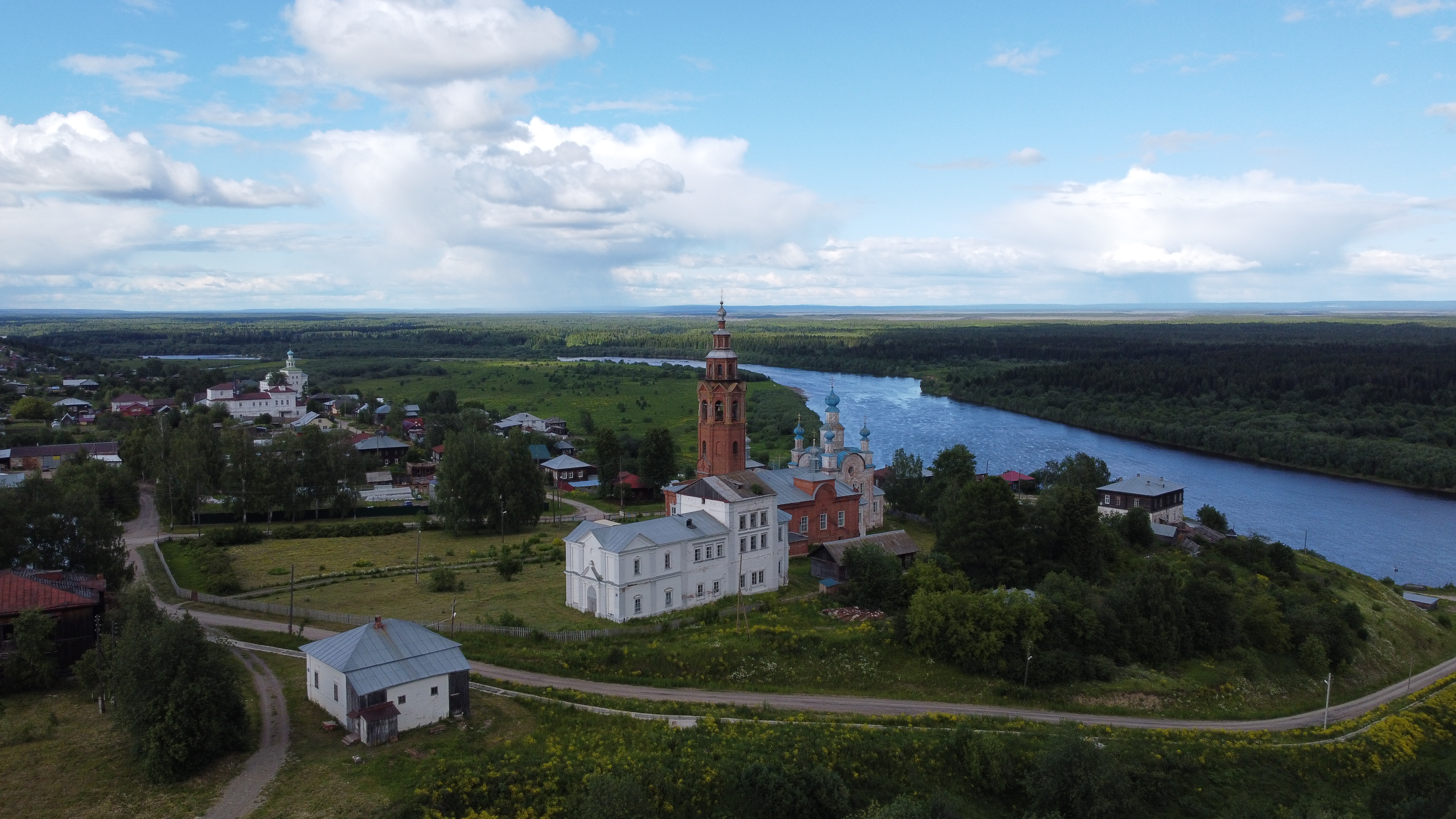

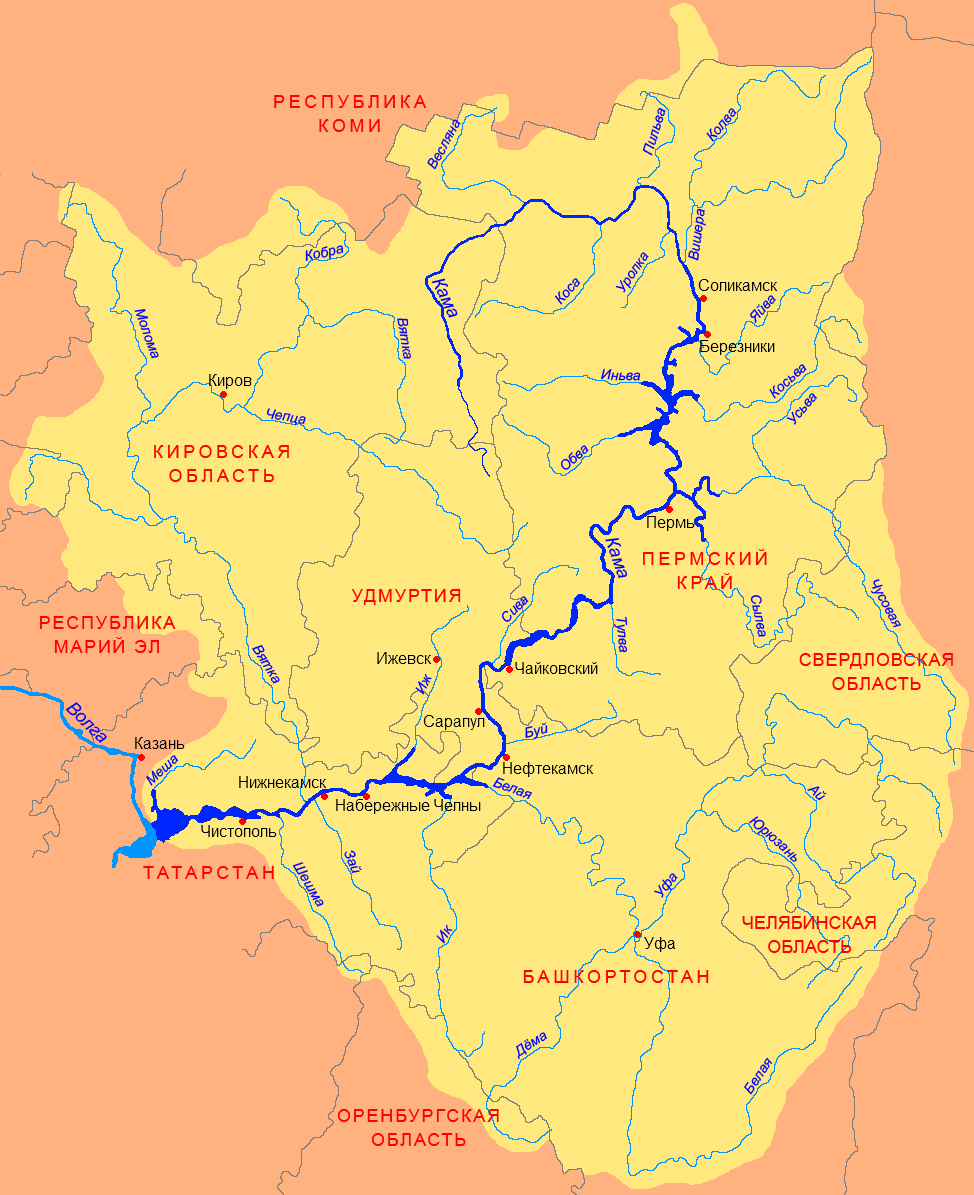
- Scheme of the Kama River Basin.

Location
- Country: Russia

Physical characteristics
- Source
  - location: North Ural
- Mouth: Vishera
  - coordinates: 60°21′56″N 56°33′11″E
- Length: 460 km (290 mi)
- Basin size: 13,500 km^{2} (5,200 sq mi)
- Discharge
  - average: 457 m^{3}/s (16,100 cu ft/s)

Basin features
- Progression: Vishera→ Kama→ Volga→ Caspian Sea

The Kolva (Russian: Колва) is a river in Perm Krai, Russia, right tributary of the Vishera of the Kama basin. The river is 460 kilometres (290 mi) long, and its drainage basin covers 13,500 square kilometres (5,200 sq mi). It starts on southeastern slope of mount Kolvinsky Kamen, in northeastern portion of Perm Krai, near the border with Komi Republic. Its mouth is near the town of Cherdyn.

The Kolva freezes up in early November and stays under the ice until late April or early May. The river is navigable within 200 to 250 kilometres (120 to 160 mi) of its estuary during the high-water season. The town of Cherdyn is along on the Kolva.

Main tributaries (from source to mouth):

- Left: Yamzhach, Seleya, Kumay, Ayya, Tulpan, Beryozovaya, Ukhtym, Nizva, Mudyl, Chudova.
- Right: Nyariz, Sukhotyl, Nyuzim, Anyl, Visherka, Vizhaikha, Bubyl, Lyzovka.

== History ==
The ancient route from the Volga region in the Pechora region passed along the Kolva. Between Cherdyn and Nyrob were found several Chud settlements, in which occur oriental coins, evidence of the importance of the Kolva as a route of communication between ancient Volga Bulgaria and the remote north.
