= Vizhaikha, Perm Krai =

Vizhaikha Вижаиха
- Settlement
- Location within Perm Krai Location within Russia
- Coordinates: 60°47′N 56°38′E
- Country: Russia
- Region: Perm Krai
- District: Cherdynsky District
- Time zone: UTC+5:00

Vizhaikha (Russian: Вижаиха) is a rural locality (a settlement) in Cherdynsky District, Perm Krai, Russia. The population was 111 as of 2010. There are 4 streets.

== Geography ==
Vizhaikha is located 57 km north of Cherdyn (the district's administrative centre) by road. Nyrob is the nearest rural locality.
