= Kad (river) =

Physical characteristics
- Source
  - location: North Ural
- Mouth: Yayva
  - coordinates: 59.6291°N 57.8904°E
- Length: 76 km (47 mi)
- Basin size: 570 km^{2} (220 sq mi)

Basin features
- Progression: Yayva→ Kama→ Volga→ Caspian Sea

The Kad (Russian: Кадь) is a river in Perm Krai, Russia, a left tributary of the Yayva. It is 76 kilometres (47 mi) long, with a drainage basin of 570 square kilometres (220 mi^{2}). It starts on the west slope of the Ural Mountains, to the west of Mount Cherdynsky Kamen, in Sverdlovsk Oblast. It flows into the Yayva about 230 kilometres (140 mi) from its mouth. There are small tributaries, the most significant of which are Plyasovaya (10 km), Kedrovaya (11 km), Samara (11 km).
