= Vels (river) =

Location
- Country: Russia

Physical characteristics
- Source
  - location: Mount Isherim
- Mouth: Vishera
  - coordinates: 60°44′50″N 58°45′56″E
- Length: 92 km (57 mi)
- Basin size: 1,490 km^{2} (580 sq mi)

Basin features
- Progression: Vishera→ Kama→ Volga→ Caspian Sea

The Vels (Russian: Велс) is a river in Perm Krai, Russia, a left tributary of the Vishera. It is 92 kilometres (57 mi) long, and its drainage basin covers 1,490 square kilometres (580 mi^{2}). It starts on the east slope of Mount Isherim, in the Vishera Nature Reserve. Its mouth is near the settlement of Vels. It is a mountain river with rapid flow. There are some small rocks along its banks downstream of Posmak River.

Main tributaries:

- Left: Bolshaya Martayka, Posmak, Chural, Shchudya
- Right: only small insignificant rivers
