= Pisanka (river) =

River in Perm Krai, Russia

Physical characteristics
- Mouth: Vishera
  - coordinates: 60°30′55″N 58°01′23″E
- Length: 34 km (21 mi)

Basin features
- Progression: Vishera→ Kama→ Volga→ Caspian Sea

The Pisanka (Russian: Писанка) is a river in Perm Krai, Russia, a right tributary of the Vishera, which in turn is a tributary of the Kama. The river is 34 kilometres (21 mi) long.
