= Yelma =

River in Perm Krai, Russia

Physical characteristics
- Mouth
  - location: Vishera
- Length: 27 km (17 mi)

Basin features
- Progression: Vishera→ Kama→ Volga→ Caspian Sea

The Yelma (Russian: Елма) is a river in Perm Krai, Russia, a right tributary of the Vishera, which in turn is a tributary of the Kama. The river is 27 kilometres (17 mi) long.
