= Uls =

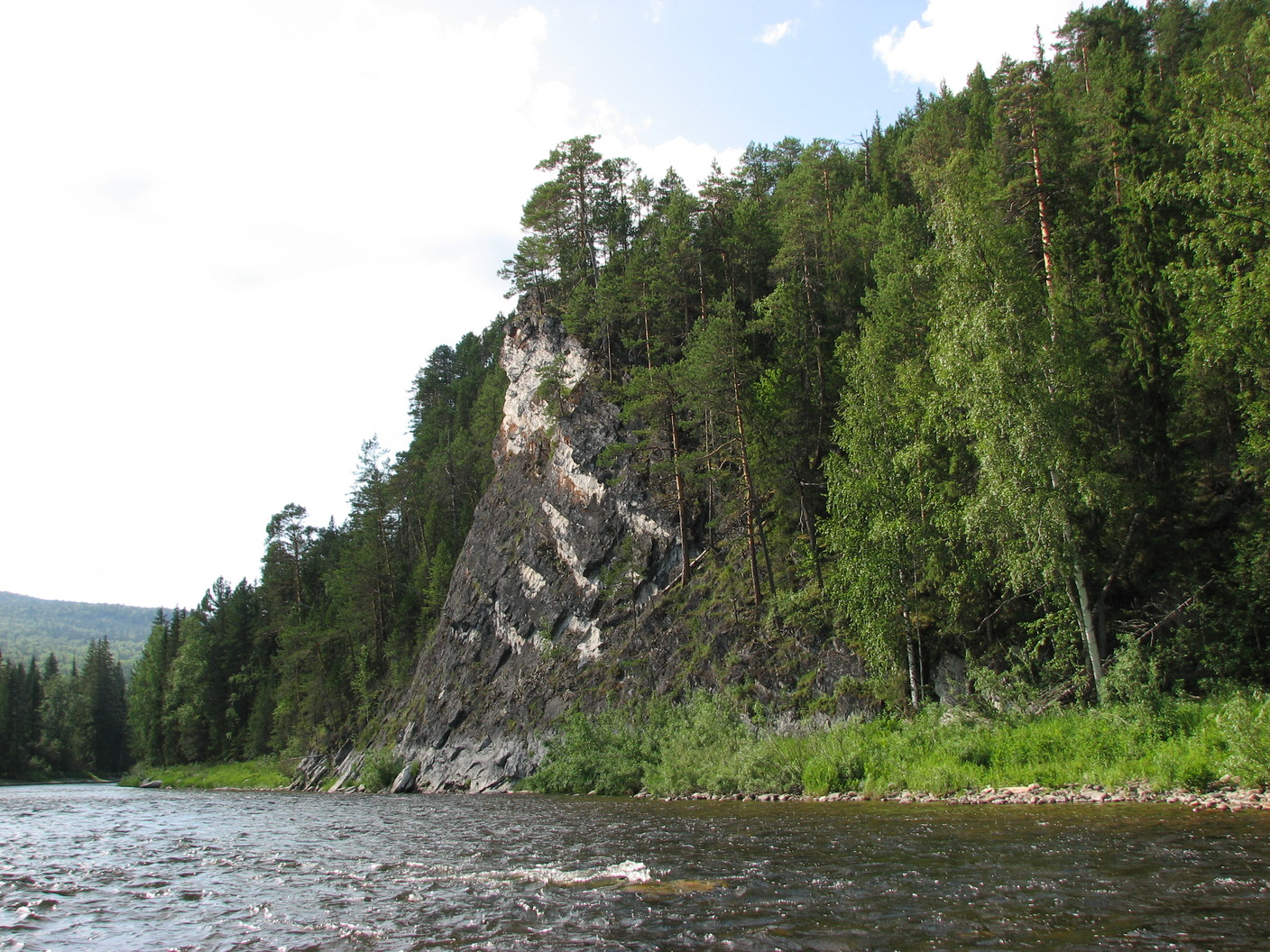

Location
- Country: Russia

Physical characteristics
- Mouth: Vishera
  - coordinates: 60.5066°N 58.3429°E
- Length: 89 km (55 mi)
- Basin size: 2,190 km^{2} (850 sq mi)

Basin features
- Progression: Vishera→ Kama→ Volga→ Caspian Sea

The Uls (Russian: Улс) is a river in Perm Krai, Russia, a left tributary of the Vishera. The river is 89 kilometres (55 mi) long, and its drainage basin is 2,190 square kilometres (850 mi^{2}). It starts near the border with Sverdlovsk Oblast. Its mouth is near the village of Ust-Uls, 233 kilometres (145 mi) from Vishera's mouth.

Main tributaries (from source to mouth):

- Left: Olkhovka, Pelya, Bolshaya Zolotanka;
- Right: Surya, Bolshaya Lyampa, Kutim, Myka .
