= Chudov (surname) =

Chudov or Tchoudov (Russian: Чудов, from чудо meaning miracle) is a Russian masculine surname, its feminine counterpart is Chudova. It may refer to

- Maxim Tchoudov (born 1982), Russian biathlete
- Tatyana Chudova (1944–2021), Russian composer
