= Krasnovishersky District =

Krasnovishersky District Красновишерский район (Russian)
- District
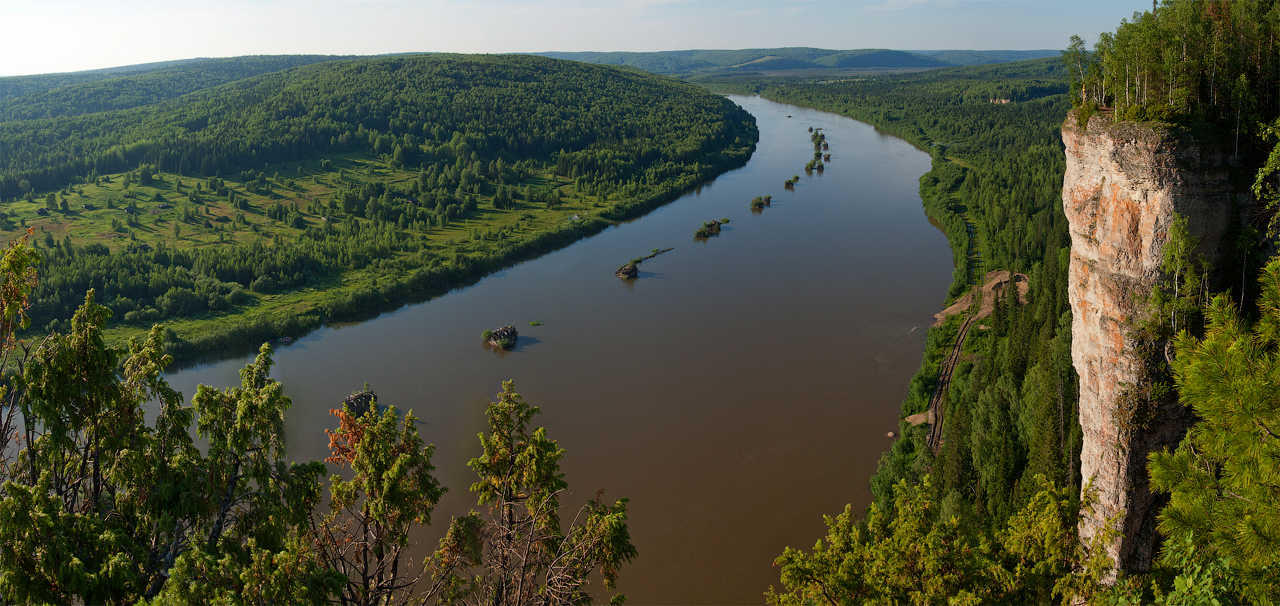
- Vetlan, Krasnovishersky District

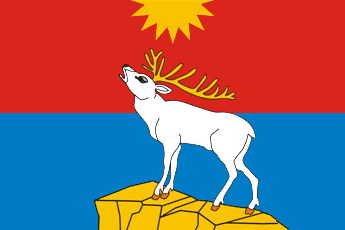
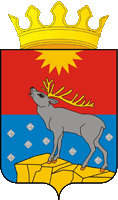
- Flag Coat of arms
- Location of Krasnovishersky District in Perm Krai
- Coordinates: 60.717°N 55.756°E
- Country: Russia
- Federal subject: Perm Krai
- Established: January 13, 1941
- Administrative center: Krasnovishersk

Area
  - Total: 15,375 km^{2} (5,936 sq mi)

Population (2010 Census)
  - Total: 22,554
  - Density: 1.4669/km^{2} (3.7993/sq mi)
  - Urban: 71.4%
  - Rural: 28.6%

Administrative structure
  - Inhabited localities: 1 cities/towns, 45 rural localities

Municipal structure
  - Municipally incorporated as: Krasnovishersky Municipal District
  - Municipal divisions: 1 urban settlements, 4 rural settlements
- Time zone: UTC+5 (MSK+2)
- OKTMO ID: 57626000
- Website: http://krasnovishersk.permarea.ru/

Krasnovishersky District (Russian: Краснови́шерский райо́н) is an administrative district (raion) of Perm Krai, Russia; one of the thirty-three in the krai. Municipally, it is incorporated as Krasnovishersky Municipal District. It is located in the northeast of the krai, in the valley of the Vishera River, and borders with the Komi Republic in the north, Sverdlovsk Oblast in the east, Cherdynsky District in the west, Solikamsky District in the south, and with the territory of the town of krai significance of Alexandrovsk in the southeast. The area of the district is 15,375 square kilometers (5,936 sq mi). Its administrative center is the town of Krasnovishersk. Population: 22,554 (2010 census); 27,871 (2002 census); 30,827 (1989 Soviet census). The population of Krasnovishersk accounts for 71.4% of the district's total population.

== Geography ==
The eastern part of the district is mostly mountainous, while the western part is mostly flat, with some hills with the height of about 190–220 meters (620–720 ft). The highest point of Perm Krai, Mount Tulymsky Kamen, is located in the district. There are many rivers in the district, including the Vishera River with its tributaries the Yazva, the Vels, the Uls, and many others. The town of Krasnovishersk is located 320 kilometers (200 mi) from the city of Perm. Natural resources of the district include diamonds, gold, oil, natural gas, and others.

The climate is temperate continental. The average annual temperature is +0.1 °C (32.2 °F); annual precipitation is 550–700 millimeters (22–28 in). Up to 87% of the district's territory is covered by forests. In the extreme northeast of the district the Vishera Nature Reserve is located.

== History ==
The district was established on January 13, 1941. Until then, its territory was a part of Cherdynsky District. Krasnovishersk, the administrative center of the district, was granted town status on July 2, 1942.

== Demographics ==
As of the 2002 Census, about 89.7% of district's population were Russians and 2.5% were the Komi people.

== Economy ==
The industry of the district includes timber industry, pulp and paper mill, mining and food industry.

== See also ==
- Visherogorsk
- Zagovorukha

== Sources ==
- Законодательное собрание Пермской области. Закон №416-67 от 28 февраля 1996 г. «Об административно-территориальном устройстве Пермского края», в ред. Закона №504-ПК от 9 июля 2015 г. «О внесении изменений в Закон Пермской области "Об административно-территориальном устройстве Пермского края"». Вступил в силу с момента опубликования. Опубликован: "Звезда", №38, 12 марта 1996 г. (Legislative Assembly of Perm Oblast. Law #416-67 of February 28, 1996 On the Administrative-Territorial Structure of Perm Krai, as amended by the Law #504-PK of July 9, 2015 On Amending the Law of Perm Oblast "On the Administrative-Territorial Structure of Perm Krai". Effective as of the moment of publication.).
- Законодательное собрание Пермской области. Закон №1755-362 от 10 ноября 2004 г. «Об утверждении границ и о наделении статусом муниципальных образований Красновишерского района Пермского края», в ред. Закона №273-ПК от 14 декабря 2013 г. «О внесении изменений в отдельные Законы Пермской области, Коми-Пермяцкого автономного округа, Пермского края». Вступил в силу через десять дней со дня официального опубликования. Опубликован: "Бюллетень Законодательного Собрания и администрации Пермской области", №12, I часть, 9 декабря 2004 г. (Legislative Assembly of Perm Oblast. Law #1755-362 of November 10, 2004 On Establishing the Borders and on Granting the Status to the Municipal Formations of Krasnovishersky District of Perm Krai, as amended by the Law #273-PK of December 14, 2013 On Amending Various Laws of Perm Oblast, Komi-Permyak Autonomous Okrug, Perm Krai. Effective as of the day which is ten days following the day of the official publication.).
