= Vishera (Perm Krai) =

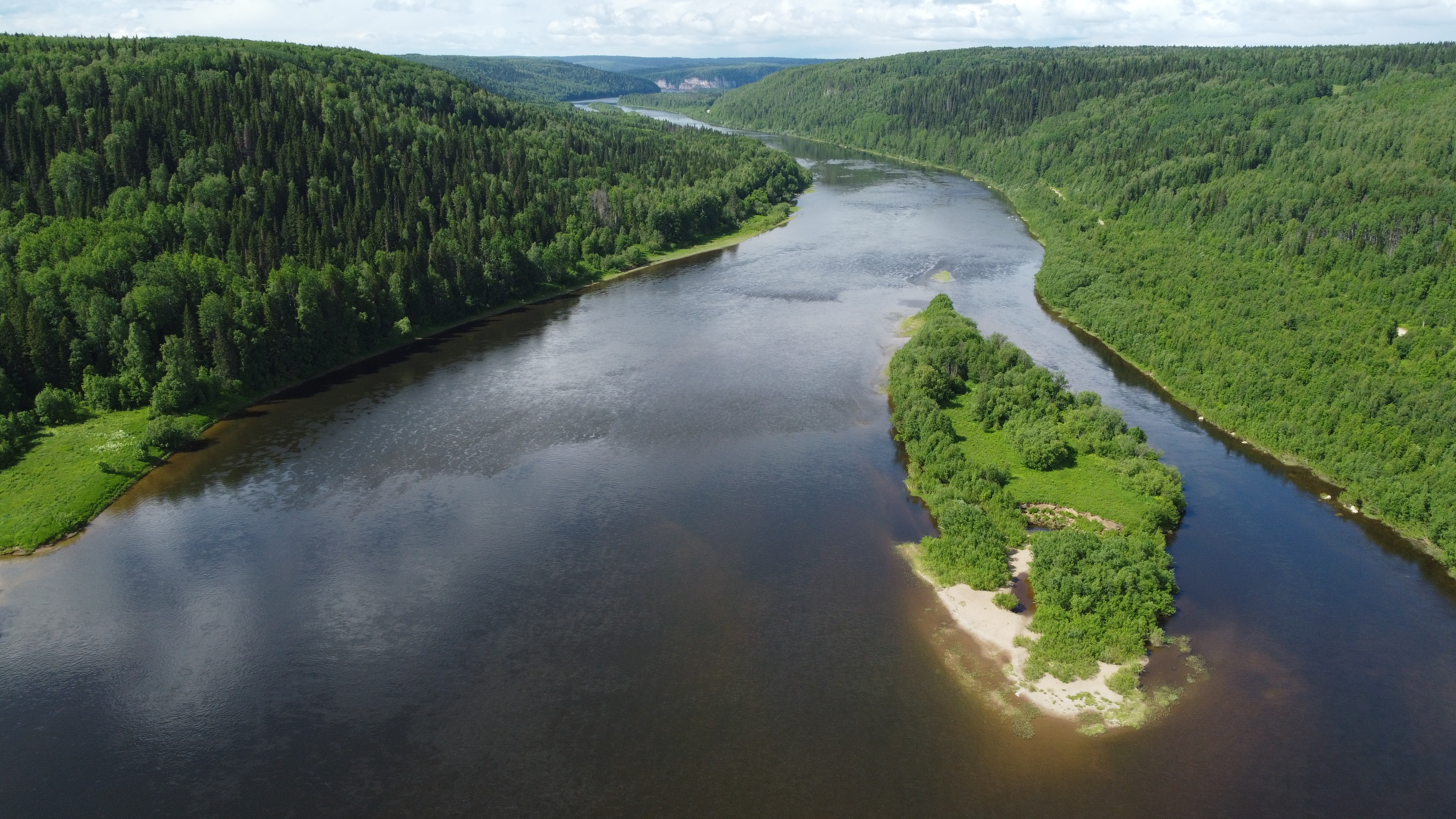
- Aerial view of the Vishera

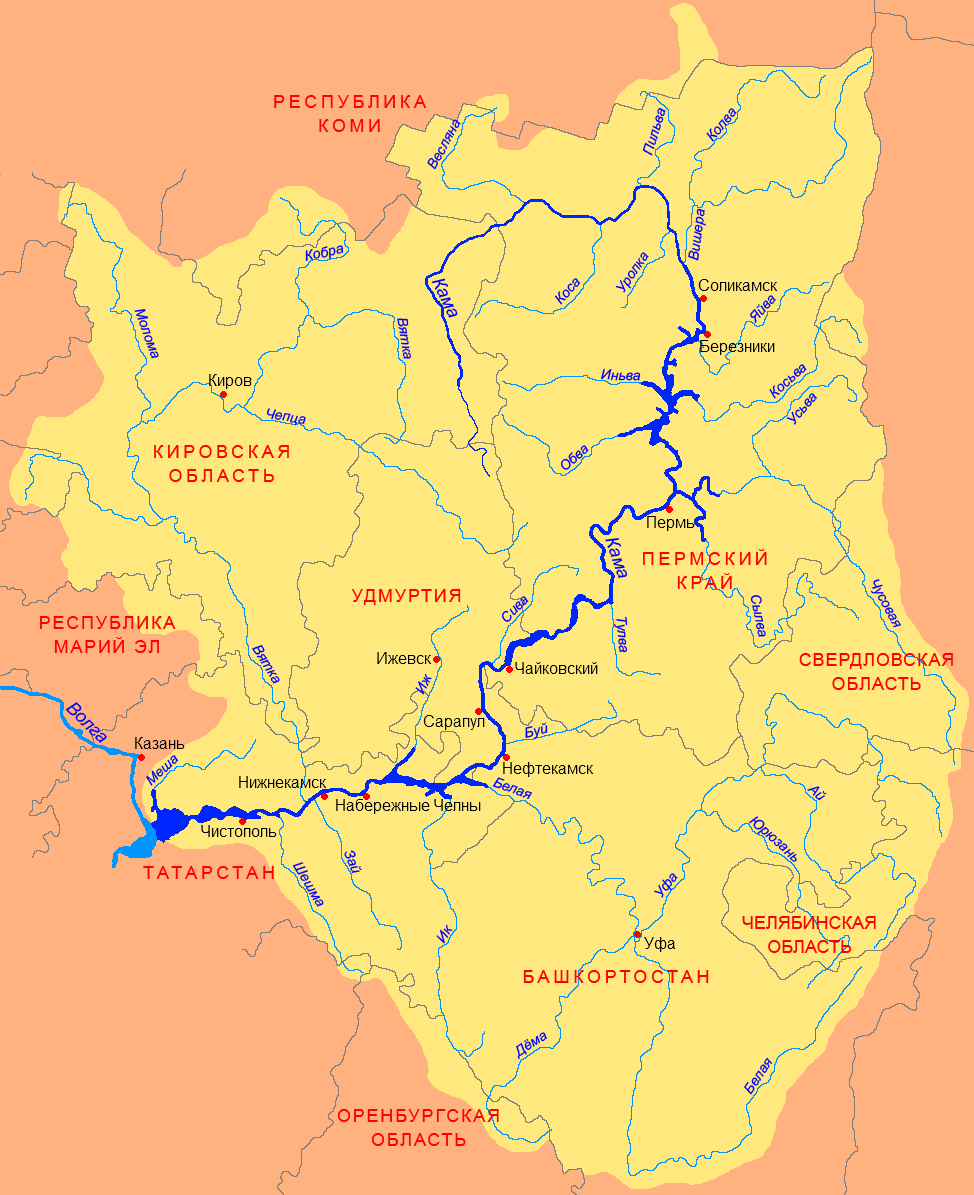
- Scheme of the Kama River Basin.

Location
- Country: Russia

Physical characteristics
- Source
  - location: North Ural
- Mouth: Kama
  - coordinates: 59°54′14″N 56°26′20″E
- Length: 415 km (258 mi)
- Basin size: 31,200 km^{2} (12,000 sq mi)
- Discharge
  - average: 457 m^{3}/s (16,100 cu ft/s)

Basin features
- Progression: Kama→ Volga→ Caspian Sea

The Vishera (Russian: Вишера) is a river in Perm Krai, Russia, a left bank tributary of the Kama. It is 415 kilometres (258 mi) long, and its drainage basin covers 31,200 square kilometres (12,000 mi^{2}). The Vishera freezes in late October or early November and stays under the ice until the end of April. There are diamond deposits in the basin of the Vishera.

The Vishera used to be part of the Cherdyn Route and is still considered one of the most picturesque rivers of the Urals. It starts on the extreme northeast of Perm Krai, near the border with the Komi Republic and Sverdlovsk Oblast. It flows on the west foothills of Ural Mountains and is a mountain river for most of its length. There are many rapids and shoals in the channel and many rocks along its banks.

The Vishera Nature Reserve is along the upper reaches of the river.

== Geography ==
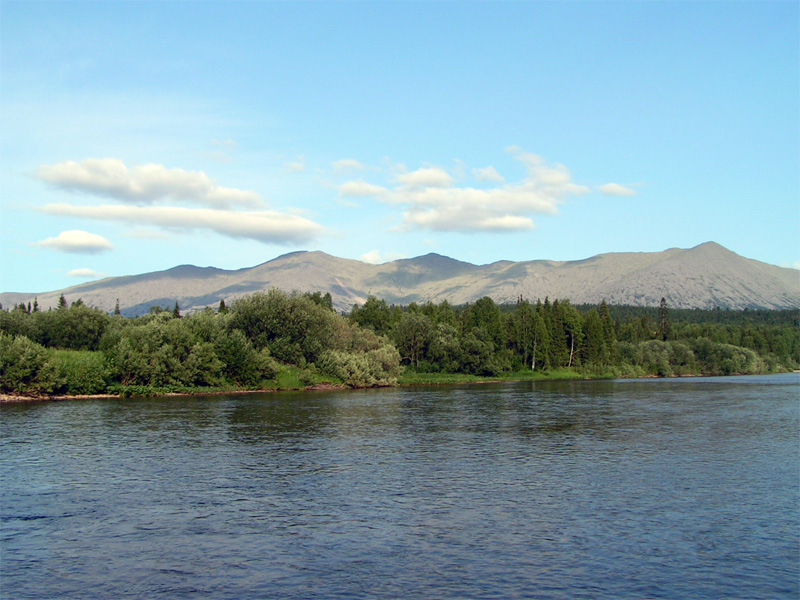
View of the Tulymsky Kamen mountain range from the banks of the Vishera

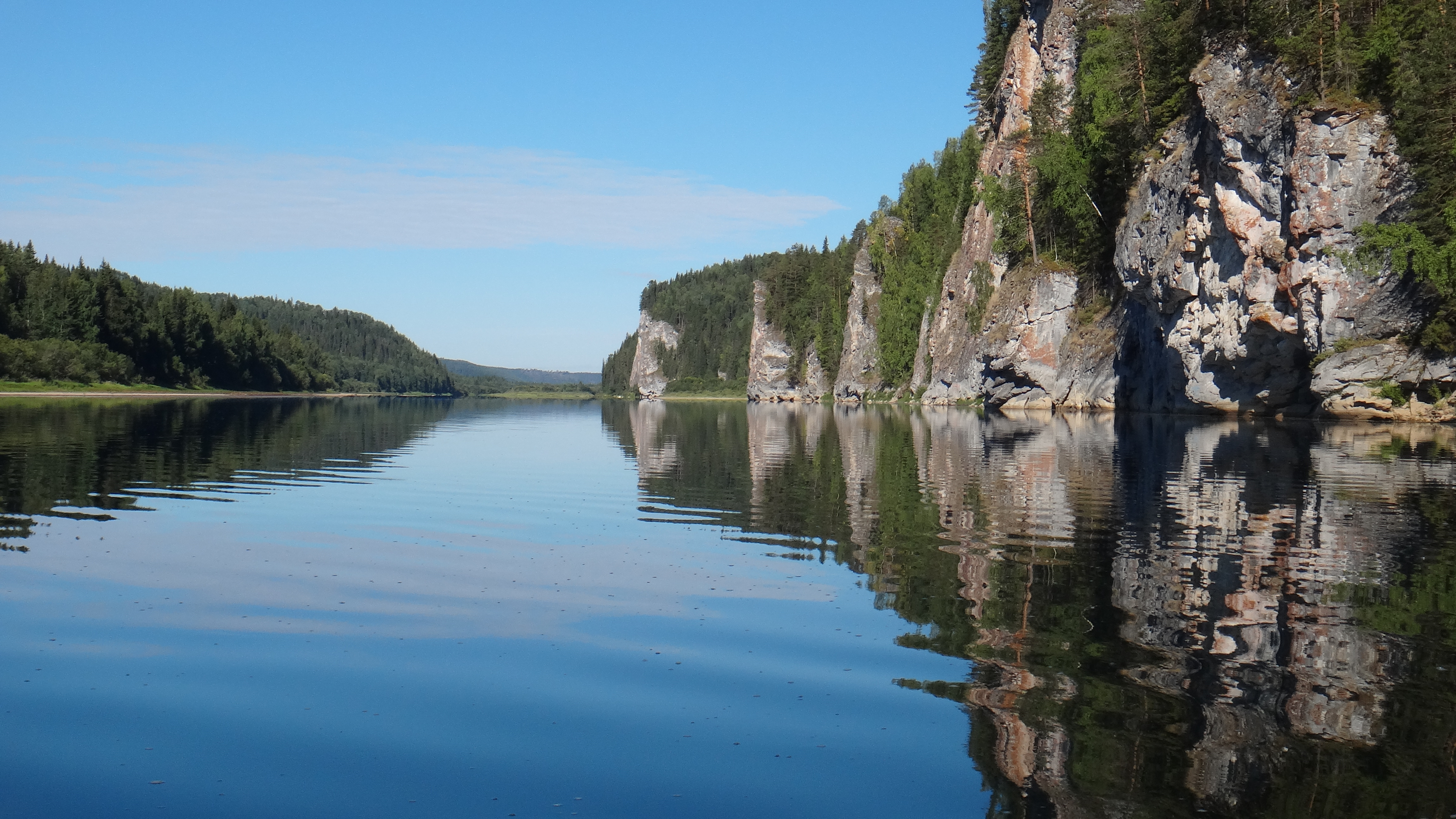
Stones of the Vishera

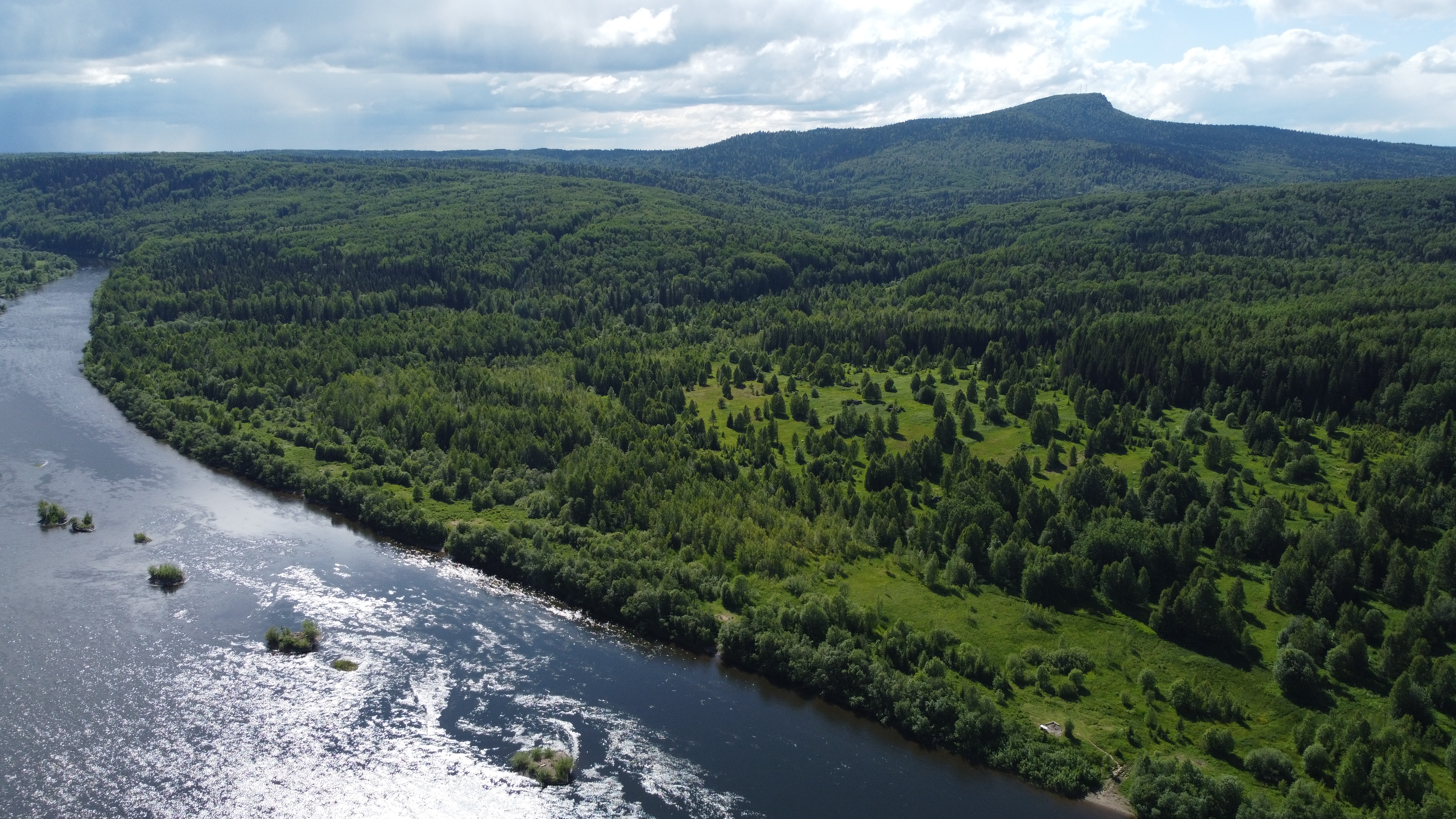
Poludov stone (aerial photograph) and Vishera River, Perm Krai

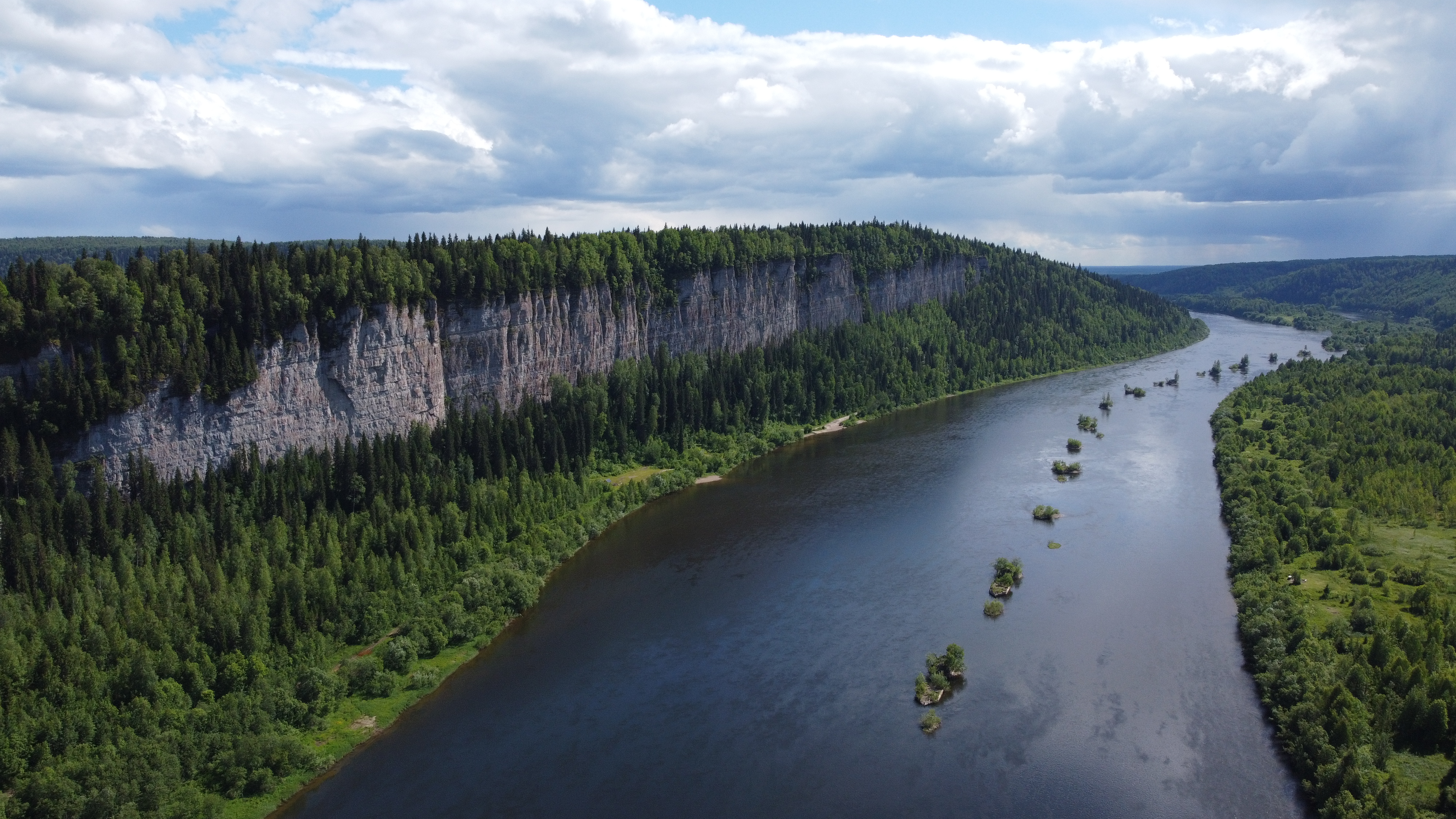
Vetlan Rock, Vishera River, Perm Krai

=== Main tributaries ===
Main tributaries (from source to mouth):

- Left: Niols, Moyva, Vels, Uls, Akchim, Yazva, Vizhaikha;
- Right: Lypya, Yelma, Bolshaya Vaya, Pisanka, Govorukha, Kolva.

== Etymology ==
Komi people call the river Viser. Experts in the Komi language noticed that this element is also in names of other rivers in Ural. A. K. Matveyev supposes that Vishera can mean Northern River or Midnight River (in Sami languages).
