= Krasnovishersk =

Town in Perm Krai, Russia

Krasnovishersk Красновишерск
- Town
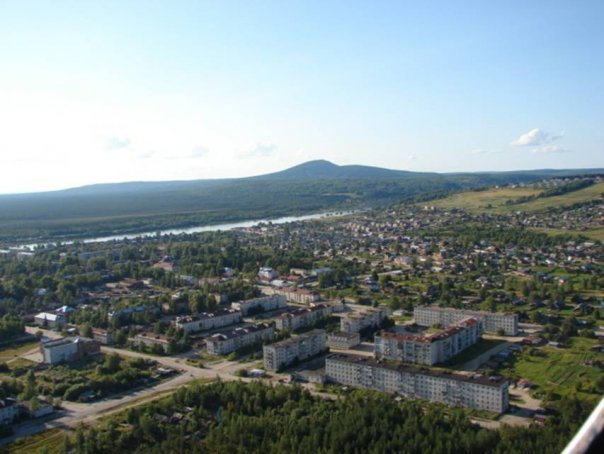
- Aerial view of Krasnovishersk

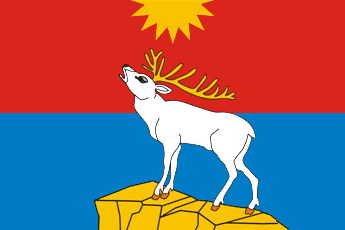
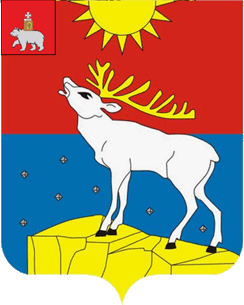
- Flag Coat of arms
- Interactive map of Krasnovishersk
- Location of Krasnovishersk Krasnovishersk (Perm Krai)
- Coordinates: 60°25′N 57°06′E
- Country: Russia
- Federal subject: Perm Krai
- Administrative district: Krasnovishersky District
- Founded: 1930
- Town status since: 1942
- Elevation: 130 m (430 ft)

Population (2010 Census)
  - Total: 16,099
  - Estimate (2023): 14,164 (−12%)

Administrative status
  - Capital of: Krasnovishersky District

Municipal status
  - Municipal district: Krasnovishersky Municipal District
  - Urban settlement: Krasnovisherskoye Urban Settlement
  - Capital of: Krasnovishersky Municipal District, Krasnovisherskoye Urban Settlement
- Time zone: UTC+5 (MSK+2)
- Postal codes: 618590–618593, 618598
- Dialing code: +7 34243
- OKTMO ID: 57626101001

Krasnovishersk (Russian: Краснови́шерск; Komi-Permyak: Вишера, Višera; Komi-Yazva: Вишöра, Višöra) is a town and the administrative center of Krasnovishersky District in Perm Krai, Russia, located on the western slopes of the Northern Urals, 315 kilometers (196 mi) north of Perm, the administrative center of the krai. As of the 2010 Census, its population was 16,099.

== Geography ==
The Vishera River flows through the town.

== History ==
The town grew out of the settlement of Vizhaikha (Вижаиха). Since 1926, the location where the town now stands served as the 4th branch of the Solovki prison camp, and since 1929—as the independent management of the Vishera camps. Krasnovishersk was officially established in 1930, the same year when a paper mill was built. Town status was granted to Krasnovishersk in 1942.

A memorial to Varlam Shalamov was erected in Krasnovishersk in June 2007 on the site of his first labor camp.

== Administrative and municipal status ==
Within the framework of administrative divisions, Krasnovishersk serves as the administrative center of Krasnovishersky District, to which it is directly subordinated. As a municipal division, the town of Krasnovishersk, together with five rural localities, is incorporated within Krasnovishersky Municipal District as Krasnovisherskoye Urban Settlement.

== Economy ==
The town's industries include timber and woodworking, as well as ferrous metallurgy. Until 2006, the main employer was the Visherabumprom paper mill, which went bankrupt and was closed.

An Uralalmaz mine extracts high-quality diamonds near Krasnovishersk.

== Transportation ==
There is no direct railway link with town; the nearest station is in Solikamsk. The town is served by the Krasnovishersk Airport, which is currently inactive.

== Demographics ==
Ethnically, 88.4% of the town's population are Russians, 0.5% are Ukrainians, 0.3% are Tatars, and 0.3% are Belarusians.

Historical population
Year	1959	1970	1979	1989	2002	2010
Pop.	15,200	14,900	15,917	18,652	18,260	16,098
±%	—	—	—	+17.2%	−2.1%	−11.8%
