= Trosheva =

Trosheva (Russian: Трошева) is the name of several rural localities in Russia:

- Trosheva (Beloyevskoye Rural Settlement), Kudymkarsky District, Perm Krai, a village in Kudymkarsky District, Perm Krai
- Trosheva (Verkh-Invenskoye Rural Settlement), Kudymkarsky District, Perm Krai, a village in Kudymkarsky District, Perm Krai
