= Kosogor =

Kosogor (Russian: Косогор) is the name of several rural localities in Russia:

- Kosogor (Beloyevskoye Rural Settlement), Kudymkarsky District, Perm Krai, a village in Beloyevskoye Rural Settlement, Kudymkarsky District, Perm Krai
- Kosogor (Leninskoye Rural Settlement), Kudymkarsky District, Perm Krai, a village in Leninskoye Rural Settlement, Kudymkarsky District, Perm Krai
