= Kosogor (Leninskoye Rural Settlement), Kudymkarsky District, Perm Krai =

Kosogor Косогор
- Village
- Location within Perm Krai Location within Russia
- Coordinates: 58°50′N 54°33′E
- Country: Russia
- Region: Perm Krai
- District: Kudymkarsky District
- Time zone: UTC+5:00

Kosogor (Russian: Косогор) is a rural locality (a village) in Leninskoye Rural Settlement, Kudymkarsky District, Perm Krai, Russia. The population was 15 as of 2010.

== Geography ==
It is located 25 km south from Kudymkar.
