= Paleva =

Paleva (Russian: Палева) is the name of several rural localities in Russia:

- Paleva (Beloyevskoye Rural Settlement), Kudymkarsky District, Perm Krai, a village in Kudymkarsky District, Perm Krai
- Paleva (Verkh-Invenskoye Rural Settlement), Kudymkarsky District, Perm Krai, a village in Kudymkarsky District, Perm Krai
