= Paleva (Beloyevskoye Rural Settlement), Kudymkarsky District, Perm Krai =

Paleva Палева
- Village
- Location within Perm Krai Location within Russia
- Coordinates: 59°08′N 54°22′E
- Country: Russia
- Region: Perm Krai
- District: Kudymkarsky District
- Time zone: UTC+5:00

Paleva (Russian: Палева) is a rural locality (a village) in Beloyevskoye Rural Settlement, Kudymkarsky District, Perm Krai, Russia. The population was 14 as of 2010.

== Geography ==
It is located 26 km north-west from Kudymkar.
