= Paleva (Verkh-Invenskoye Rural Settlement), Kudymkarsky District, Perm Krai =

Paleva Палева
- Village
- Location within Perm Krai Location within Russia
- Coordinates: 58°58′N 54°20′E
- Country: Russia
- Region: Perm Krai
- District: Kudymkarsky District
- Time zone: UTC+5:00

Paleva (Russian: Палева) is a rural locality (a village) in Verkh-Invenskoye Rural Settlement, Kudymkarsky District, Perm Krai, Russia. The population was 73 as of 2010.

== Geography ==
It is located 29 km west from Kudymkar.
