= Senina =

Senina (Russian: Сенина) is the name of several rural localities in Russia:

- Senina (Beloyevskoye Rural Settlement), Kudymkarsky District, Perm Krai, a village in Kudymkarsky District, Perm Krai
- Senina (Verkh-Invenskoye Rural Settlement), Kudymkarsky District, Perm Krai, a village in Kudymkarsky District, Perm Krai
