= Gayshor =

Gayshor Гайшор
- Village
- Location within Perm Krai Location within Russia
- Coordinates: 58°50′N 54°36′E
- Country: Russia
- Region: Perm Krai
- District: Kudymkarsky District
- Time zone: UTC+5:00

Gayshor (Russian: Гайшор) is a rural locality (a village) in Leninskoye Rural Settlement, Kudymkarsky District, Perm Krai, Russia. The population was 37 as of 2010. Gayshor is located 27 km southwest of Kudymkar (the district's administrative centre) by road. Kanamova is the nearest rural locality.
