= Perm constituency =

Legislative constituency in Russia

Perm single-member constituency
- Constituency of the Russian State Duma

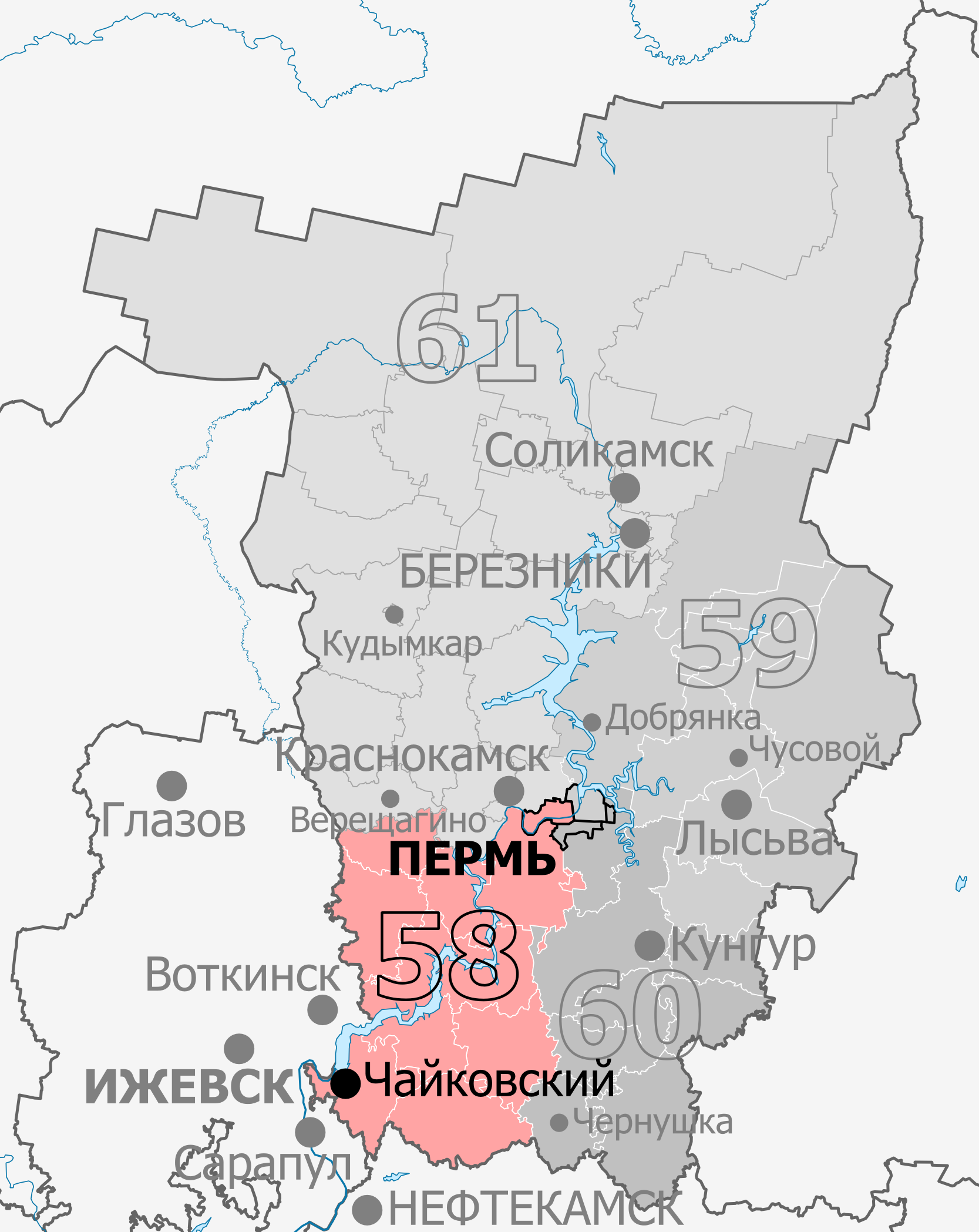
- Constituency boundaries since 2016
- Deputy: Anton Nemkin; United Russia
- Federal subject: Perm Krai
- Districts: Bardymsky, Bolshesosnovsky, Chastinsky, Chaykovsky, Kuyedinsky, Ochyorsky, Okhansky, Osinsky, Perm (Dzerzhinsky, Kirovsky, Leninsky), Permsky (Gamovskoye, Kondratovskoye, Kultayevskoye, Savinskoye, Ust-Kachkinskoye, Yugo-Kamskoye, Yugovskoye, Zabolotskoye), Yelovsky, ZATO Zvyozdny
- Voters: 513,137 (2026)

The Perm constituency (No.62 (Note: Leninsky constituency No.139 in 1993-2007, No.58 in 2016–2026)) is a Russian legislative constituency in Perm Krai. The constituency covers western Perm and southwestern Perm Krai.

The constituency has been represented since 2026 by United Russia deputy Anton Nemkin, two-term State Duma member and retired FSB officer, who won the open seat, succeeding two-term United Russia incumbent Igor Shubin.

== Boundaries ==
1993–1995 Leninsky constituency: Karagaysky District, Nytvensky District, Perm (Dzerzhinsky, Industrialny, Kirovsky, Leninsky), Permsky District, Sivinsky District, Vereshchaginsky District
The constituency covered western half of Perm, including the city centre, as well as its suburbs and rural areas to the west and northwest of the city.

1995–2007 Leninsky constituency: Karagaysky District, Nytvensky District, Perm (Dzerzhinsky, Industrialny, Kirovsky, Leninsky), Permsky District, Sivinsky District, Zvyozdny
After the 1995 redistricting the constituency was slightly changed, losing Vereshchaginsky District to Kungur constituency.

2016–present: Bardymsky District, Bolshesosnovsky District, Chastinsky District, Chaykovsky, Kuyedinsky District, Ochyorsky District, Okhansky District, Osinsky District, Perm (Dzerzhinsky, Kirovsky, Leninsky), Permsky District (Gamovskoye, Kondratovskoye, Kultayevskoye, Savinskoye, Ust-Kachkinskoye, Yugo-Kamskoye, Yugovskoye, Zabolotskoye), Yelovsky District, Zvyozdny
The constituency was re-created under the name "Perm constituency" for the 2016 election in Perm Krai, which was created by the merger of Perm Oblast and Komi-Permyak Autonomous Okrug in 2005. This seat retained most of its Perm portion and its southern and southwestern suburbs, losing its tail to eastern Perm Krai to Kudymkar constituency. Instead the constituency gained southwestern corner of Perm Krai, including the industrial town of Chaykovsky from Kungur constituency.

== Members elected ==
| Election | Member | Party |
|---|---|---|
| 1993 | Vladimir Zelenin (Note: died in May 1999) | Independent |
| 1995 | Vladimir Zelenin | Independent |
| 1999 | Pavel Anokhin | Independent |
| 2003 | Pavel Anokhin | Independent |
| 2007 | Proportional representation - no election by constituency | |
| 2011 | Proportional representation - no election by constituency | |
| 2016 | Igor Shubin | United Russia |
| 2021 | Igor Shubin | United Russia |
| 2026 | Anton Nemkin | United Russia |

== Election results ==
=== 1993 ===
Summary of the 12 December 1993 Russian legislative election in the Leninsky constituency
| Candidate | Party | Votes | % |
|---|---|---|---|
| Vladimir Zelenin | Independent | 52,830 | 22.23% |
| Viktor Novikov | Independent | 34,147 | 14.37% |
| Nikolay Bukhvalov | Independent | 31,895 | 13.42% |
| Leonid Kuznetsov | Independent | 18,084 | 7.61% |
| Igor Averkiyev | Independent | 16,778 | 7.06% |
| Vasily Nezhdanov | Russian Democratic Reform Movement | 16,739 | 7.04% |
| Gennady Verevkin | Independent | 7,740 | 3.26% |
| against all | | 32,448 | 13.65% |
| Total | | 237,660 | 100% |

=== 1995 ===
Summary of the 17 December 1995 Russian legislative election in the Leninsky constituency
| Candidate | Party | Votes | % |
|---|---|---|---|
| Vladimir Zelenin (incumbent) | Independent | 72,982 | 24.82% |
| Andrey Klimov | Independent | 55,306 | 18.81% |
| Gennady Kuzmitsky | Our Home – Russia | 36,979 | 12.58% |
| Dmitry Chumachenko | Liberal Democratic Party | 18,563 | 6.31% |
| Natalya Mishina | Forward, Russia! | 14,469 | 4.92% |
| Igor Averkiyev | Social Democrats | 14,017 | 4.77% |
| Irina Zalevskaya | Power to the People | 13,242 | 4.50% |
| Boris Berestov | Stanislav Govorukhin Bloc | 9,637 | 3.28% |
| Nafis Sayfullin | Party of Russian Unity and Accord | 5,775 | 1.96% |
| against all | | 46,110 | 15.68% |
| Total | | 294,027 | 100% |

=== 1999 ===
Summary of the 19 December 1999 Russian legislative election in the Leninsky constituency
| Candidate | Party | Votes | % |
|---|---|---|---|
| Pavel Anokhin | Independent | 60,996 | 20.56% |
| Ilya Neustroyev | Independent | 47,155 | 15.89% |
| Yevgeny Sapiro | Fatherland – All Russia | 41,571 | 14.01% |
| Albert Bogdanovich | Independent | 21,424 | 7.22% |
| Mikhail Suslov | Independent | 19,661 | 6.63% |
| Igor Ryazantsev | Yabloko | 17,448 | 5.88% |
| Dmitry Chumachenko | Independent | 14,366 | 4.84% |
| Vladimir Filin | Movement in Support of the Army | 4,780 | 1.61% |
| Igor Yakovlev | Independent | 4,766 | 1.61% |
| Leonid Olenev | Andrey Nikolayev and Svyatoslav Fyodorov Bloc | 3,916 | 1.32% |
| Igor Tyulenev | Spiritual Heritage | 3,124 | 1.05% |
| Yevgeny Rukin (Rifey) | Russian Conservative Party of Entrepreneurs | 2,647 | 0.89% |
| against all | | 48,705 | 16.41% |
| Total | | 296,720 | 100% |

=== 2003 ===
Summary of the 7 December 2003 Russian legislative election in the Leninsky constituency
| Candidate | Party | Votes | % |
|---|---|---|---|
| Pavel Anokhin (incumbent) | Independent | 95,694 | 30.56% |
| Ilya Neustroyev | Union of Right Forces | 64,004 | 20.44% |
| Vyacheslav Vakhrin | Independent | 41,817 | 13.35% |
| Vladimir Korsun | Communist Party | 13,838 | 4.42% |
| Aleksandr Mubarakshin | Agrarian Party | 9,609 | 3.07% |
| Irina Cherepanova | Independent | 9,504 | 3.04% |
| Aleksey Chernykh | Rodina | 8,102 | 2.59% |
| Igor Nevorotov | Liberal Democratic Party | 5,699 | 1.82% |
| Sergey Semenov | Independent | 3,291 | 1.05% |
| Khalil Abdrashitov | Independent | 2,739 | 0.87% |
| against all | | 52,433 | 16.74% |
| Total | | 313,678 | 100% |

=== 2016 ===
Summary of the 18 September 2016 Russian legislative election in the Perm constituency
| Candidate | Party | Votes | % |
|---|---|---|---|
| Igor Shubin | United Russia | 77,418 | 40.76% |
| Vladimir Alikin | A Just Russia | 21,460 | 11.30% |
| Olga Rogozhnikova | Liberal Democratic Party | 20,009 | 10.53% |
| Aleksey Selyutin | Communist Party | 18,758 | 9.88% |
| Viktor Pokhmelkin | Party of Growth | 17,968 | 9.46% |
| Oleg Myasnikov | Yabloko | 6,432 | 3.39% |
| Yevgeny Skobelin | Communists of Russia | 5,618 | 2.96% |
| Almir Amayev | People's Freedom Party | 4,093 | 2.15% |
| Andrey Tribunsky | The Greens | 3,927 | 2.07% |
| Total | | 189,942 | 100% |

=== 2021 ===
Summary of the 17-19 September 2021 Russian legislative election in the Perm constituency
| Candidate | Party | Votes | % |
|---|---|---|---|
| Igor Shubin (incumbent) | United Russia | 58,731 | 29.99% |
| Olesya Gorbunova | Communist Party | 45,427 | 23.20% |
| Arkady Nepryakhin | A Just Russia — For Truth | 22,345 | 11.41% |
| Denis Shitov | New People | 17,892 | 9.14% |
| Aleksey Balandin | Liberal Democratic Party | 14,765 | 7.54% |
| Yevgeny Lyubimov | Communists of Russia | 10,540 | 5.38% |
| Vladimir Romanov | Party of Pensioners | 10,218 | 5.22% |
| Total | | 195,795 | 100% |

=== 2026 ===
Summary of the 18-20 September 2026 Russian legislative election in the Perm constituency
| Candidate | Party | Votes | % |
|---|---|---|---|
| Anton Nemkin | United Russia | 104,772 | 44.26% |
| Dmitry Novokreshchenov | Communist Party | 24,308 | 10.27% |
| Nikolay Bogdanov | New People | 20,822 | 8.80% |
| Armen Bezhanyan | A Just Russia | 20,189 | 8.53% |
| Konstantin Ponomarev | Yabloko | 16,823 | 7.11% |
| Yan Romanov | Liberal Democratic Party | 15,997 | 6.76% |
| Matvey Alekseyev | Communists of Russia | 13,757 | 5.81% |
| Dmitry Petukhov | Party of Pensioners | 11,498 | 4.86% |
| Total | | 236,705 | 100% |
