= Kungur constituency =

Legislative constituency in Russia

Kungur single-member constituency
- Constituency of the Russian State Duma

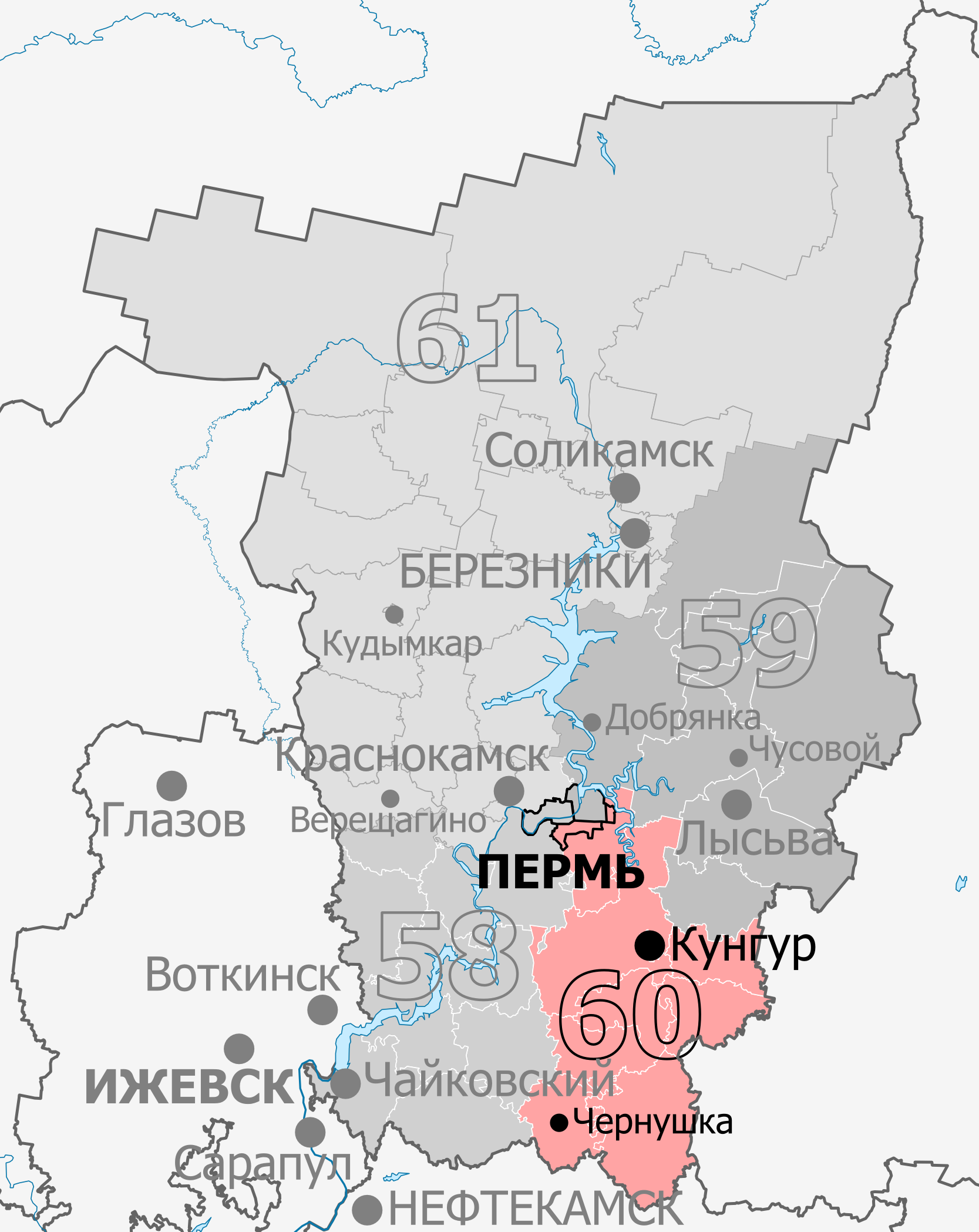
- Constituency boundaries since 2016
- Deputy: Irina Ivenskikh; United Russia
- Federal subject: Perm Krai
- Districts: Chernushinsky, Kishertsky, Kungur, Kungursky, Oktyabrsky, Ordinsky, Perm (Industrialny, Sverdlovsky), Permsky (Bershetskoye, Dvurechenskoye, Frolovskoye, Kukushtanskoye, Lobanovskoye, Palnikovakoye, Platoshinskoye, Sylvenskoye), Suksunsky, Uinsky
- Voters: 507,284 (2026)

The Kungur constituency (No.64 (Note: No.138 in 1993-2007, No.60 in 2016–2026)) is a Russian legislative constituency in Perm Krai. The constituency covers southern and eastern Perm as well as southeastern Perm Krai.

The constituency has been represented since 2026 by United Russia deputy Irina Ivenskikh, two-term State Duma member and former Deputy Premier of Perm Krai, who won the open seat after defeating two-term United Russia incumbent Dmitry Skrivanov in the primary.

== Boundaries ==
1993–1995: Bardymsky District, Beryozovsky District, Bolshesosnovsky District, Chastinsky District, Chaykovsky, Chernushinsky District, Kishertsky District, Kungur, Kungursky District, Kuyedinsky District, Lysva, Ochersky District, Okhansky District, Oktyabrsky District, Ordinsky District, Osinsky District, Suksunsky District, Uinsky District, Yelovsky District
The constituency covered the entirety of southern Perm Oblast, including the towns of Chaykovsky, Kungur and Lysva.

1995–2007: Bardymsky District, Beryozovsky District, Bolshesosnovsky District, Chastinsky District, Chaykovsky, Chernushinsky District, Kishertsky District, Kungur, Kungursky District, Kuyedinsky District, Lysva, Ochersky District, Okhansky District, Oktyabrsky District, Ordinsky District, Osinsky District, Suksunsky District, Uinsky District, Vereshchaginsky District, Yelovsky District
After the 1995 redistricting the constituency was slightly changed, gaining Vereshchaginsky District from Leninsky constituency.

2016–present: Chernushinsky District, Kishertsky District, Kungur, Kungursky District, Oktyabrsky District, Ordinsky District, Perm (Industrialny, Sverdlovsky), Permsky District (Bershetskoye, Dvurechenskoye, Frolovskoye, Kukushtanskoye, Lobanovskoye, Palnikovakoye, Platoshinskoye, Sylvenskoye), Suksunsky District, Uinsky District
The constituency was re-created for the 2016 election in Perm Krai, which was created by the merger of Perm Oblast and Komi-Permyak Autonomous Okrug in 2005. This seat retained southeastern Perm Krai, losing southwestern Perm Krai and Chaykovsky to Perm constituency, and Lysva to Chusovoy constituency. Instead the constituency gained southern and eastern parts of Perm from Leninsky and Sverdlovsky constituencies.

== Members elected ==
Election	Member	Party
1993	Mikhail Putilov	Civic Union
1995	Vladimir Shestakov	Independent
1999	Sergey Chikulayev	Fatherland – All Russia
2003	Yury Medvedev	United Russia
2007	Proportional representation - no election by constituency	
2011	Proportional representation - no election by constituency	
2016	Dmitry Skrivanov	United Russia
2021	Dmitry Skrivanov	United Russia
2026	Irina Ivenskikh	United Russia

== Election results ==
=== 1993 ===
Summary of the 12 December 1993 Russian legislative election in the Kungur constituency
Candidate	Party	Votes	%
Mikhail Putilov	Civic Union	74,661	30.59%
Yury Babikov	Independent	45,634	18.70%
Valery Zimov	Choice of Russia	27,564	11.29%
Aleksandr Belorusov	Independent	25,612	10.49%
Boris Stratilatov	Yavlinsky–Boldyrev–Lukin	19,220	7.87%
against all		29,094	11.92%
Total		244,064	100%

=== 1995 ===
Summary of the 17 December 1995 Russian legislative election in the Kungur constituency
Candidate	Party	Votes	%
Vladimir Shestakov	Independent	147,523	44.98%
Aleksandr Dranitsyn	Independent	87,332	26.63%
Andrey Sobko	Liberal Democratic Party	16,818	5.13%
Anatoly Lamanov	Independent	15,805	4.82%
Aleksey Filimonov	Independent	13,756	4.19%
Yury Kutaliya	Party of Russian Unity and Accord	7,418	2.26%
against all		31,788	9.69%
Total		327,954	100%

=== 1999 ===
Summary of the 19 December 1999 Russian legislative election in the Kungur constituency
Candidate	Party	Votes	%
Sergey Chikulayev	Fatherland – All Russia	101,127	30.85%
Sergey Shakhray	Independent	73,423	22.40%
Grigory Laptev	Independent	72,990	22.27%
Sergey Krutov	Yabloko	14,917	4.55%
Pyotr Yevdokimov	Independent	13,492	4.12%
Vladimir Ivanin	Independent	8,968	2.74%
Rastam Valeyev	Independent	5,782	1.76%
Nikolay Ignatyev	Independent	5,067	1.55%
Vitaly Vilensky	Spiritual Heritage	891	0.27%
against all		24,941	7.61%
Total		327,751	100%

=== 2003 ===
Summary of the 7 December 2003 Russian legislative election in the Kungur constituency
Candidate	Party	Votes	%
Yury Medvedev	United Russia	140,437	41.77%
Vladimir Shestakov	Independent	105,556	31.40%
Anatoly Lykov	Communist Party	17,830	5.30%
Viktor Volkov	Agrarian Party	12,978	3.86%
Aleksandr Zhuravlev	Liberal Democratic Party	8,806	2.62%
Vladimir Savchenkov	Russian Pensioners' Party-Party of Social Justice	6,111	1.82%
Yury Solodovnikov	Independent	1,487	0.44%
against all		36,880	10.97%
Total		336,388	100%

=== 2016 ===
Summary of the 18 September 2016 Russian legislative election in the Kungur constituency
Candidate	Party	Votes	%
Dmitry Skrivanov	United Russia	82,656	43.32%
Aleksey Zolotarev	Liberal Democratic Party	23,976	12.57%
Vladimir Grebenyuk	Communist Party	22,281	11.68%
Sergey Zlobin	A Just Russia	17,647	9.25%
Nadezhda Agisheva	Yabloko	12,148	6.37%
Aleksandr Sozinov	Communists of Russia	7,700	4.04%
Anton Lyubich	Party of Growth	3,568	1.87%
Yevgeny Zubov	Rodina	3,200	1.68%
Aleksandr Mishchenkov	People's Freedom Party	2,883	1.51%
Total		190,782	100%

=== 2021 ===
Summary of the 17-19 September 2021 Russian legislative election in the Kungur constituency
Candidate	Party	Votes	%
Dmitry Skrivanov (incumbent)	United Russia	57,121	30.15%
Aleksey Kostitsyn	Communist Party	31,755	16.76%
Veronika Kulikova	A Just Russia — For Truth	28,287	14.93%
Sergey Isayev	New People	18,636	9.84%
Yekaterina Balykina	Liberal Democratic Party	13,228	6.98%
Olga Vshivkova	Yabloko	10,660	5.63%
Lyudmila Balakhonskaya	Party of Pensioners	8,752	4.62%
Yana Kunavina	Communists of Russia	7,001	3.70%
Total		189,470	100%

=== 2026 ===
Summary of the 18-20 September 2026 Russian legislative election in the Kungur constituency
Candidate	Party	Votes	%
Irina Ivenskikh	United Russia	93,950	40.79%
Anna Baranova	Communist Party	27,610	11.99%
Aleksey Ovchinnikov	New People	25,233	10.96%
Yekaterina Balykina	Liberal Democratic Party	20,535	8.92%
Olga Vshivkova	Yabloko	19,754	8.58%
Irina Kazantseva	Party of Pensioners	13,092	5.68%
Veronika Kulikova	A Just Russia	12,180	5.29%
Mikhail Dyachkov	Communists of Russia	8,622	3.74%
Total		230,301	100%
