= Chusovoy constituency =

Legislative constituency in Russia

Chusovoy single-member constituency
- Constituency of the Russian State Duma

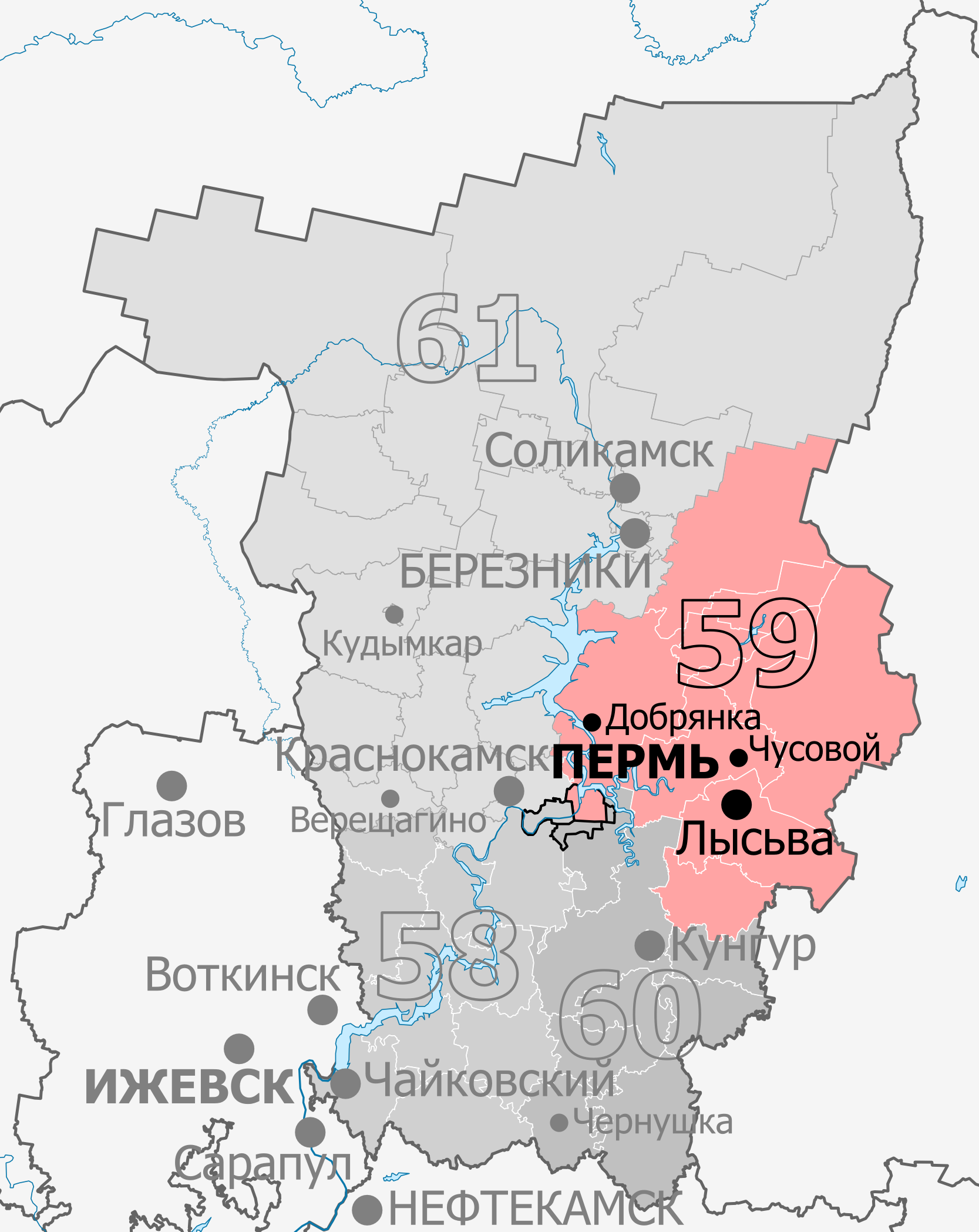
- Constituency boundaries since 2016
- Deputy: Roman Vodyanov; United Russia
- Federal subject: Perm Krai
- Districts: Alexandrovsk, Beryozovsky, Chusovoy, Dobryanka, Gubakha, Gornozavodsky, Gremyachinsk, Kizel, Lysva, Perm (Motovilikhinsky, Ordzhonikidzevsky), Permsky (Khokhlovskoye)
- Voters: 487,688 (2026)

The Chusovoy constituency (No.63 (Note: Sverdlovsky constituency No.140 in 1993-2007, No.59 in 2016–2026)) is a Russian legislative constituency in Perm Krai. The constituency covers northeastern Perm and eastern Perm Krai.

The constituency has been represented since 2021 by United Russia deputy Roman Vodyanov, a businessman, who won the open seat after defeating one-term United Russian incumbent Aleksey Burnashov in the primary.

== Boundaries ==
1993–2003 Sverdlovsky constituency: Dobryanka, Dobryansky District, Ilyinsky District, Krasnokamsk, Perm (Motovilikhinsky, Ordzhonikidzevsky, Sverdlovsky)
The constituency covered eastern half of Perm and stretched northwards to the town of Dobryanka and the border with Komi-Permyak Autonomous Okrug.

2003–2007 Sverdlovsky constituency: Ilyinsky District, Krasnokamsk, Perm (Motovilikhinsky, Ordzhonikidzevsky, Sverdlovsky)
After the 2003 redistricting the constituency was slightly changed, losing Dobryanka and Dobryansky District to Berezniki constituency.

2016–present: Alexandrovsky District, Beryozovsky District, Chusovoy District, Dobryansky District, Gubakhinsky District, Gornozavodsky District, Kizelovsky District, Lysvensky District, Perm (Motovilikhinsky, Ordzhonikidzevsky), Permsky District (Khokhlovskoye)
The constituency was re-created under the name "Chusovoy constituency" for the 2016 election in Perm Krai, which was created by the merger of Perm Oblast and Komi-Permyak Autonomous Okrug in 2005. This seat retained most of its Perm portion and its northern suburbs, losing Krasnokamsk and Ilyinsky District to Kudymkar constituency. Instead the constituency gained eastern Perm Krai, including the towns of Alexandrovsk, Dobryanka Gremyachinsk, Gubakha, Kizel and Chusovoy from Berezniki constituency, Lysva from Kungur constituency.

== Members elected ==
| Election | Member | Party |
|---|---|---|
| 1993 | Viktor Pokhmelkin | Choice of Russia |
| 1995 | Viktor Pokhmelkin | Democratic Choice of Russia – United Democrats |
| 1999 | Viktor Pokhmelkin | Union of Right Forces |
| 2003 | Viktor Pokhmelkin | New Course — Automobile Russia |
| 2007 | Proportional representation - no election by constituency | |
| 2011 | Proportional representation - no election by constituency | |
| 2016 | Aleksey Burnashov | United Russia |
| 2021 | Roman Vodyanov | United Russia |
| 2026 | Roman Vodyanov | United Russia |

== Election results ==
=== 1993 ===
Summary of the 12 December 1993 Russian legislative election in the Sverdlovsky constituency
| Candidate | Party | Votes | % |
|---|---|---|---|
| Viktor Pokhmelkin | Choice of Russia | 79,707 | 37.49% |
| Vladimir Zotin | Independent | 24,137 | 11.35% |
| Aleksey Denisov | Yavlinsky–Boldyrev–Lukin | 22,302 | 10.49% |
| Aleksandr Reshetnikov | Civic Union | 21,673 | 10.19% |
| Aleksey Chernykh | Independent | 14,808 | 6.96% |
| against all | | 29,951 | 14.09% |
| Total | | 212,626 | 100% |

=== 1995 ===
Summary of the 17 December 1995 Russian legislative election in the Sverdlovsky constituency
| Candidate | Party | Votes | % |
|---|---|---|---|
| Viktor Pokhmelkin (incumbent) | Democratic Choice of Russia – United Democrats | 71,415 | 25.21% |
| Nail Salakhov | Independent | 46,948 | 16.57% |
| Vladimir Zotin | Yabloko | 27,895 | 9.85% |
| Aleksandr Reshetnikov | Congress of Russian Communities | 22,827 | 8.06% |
| Irina Novikova | Women of Russia | 18,659 | 6.59% |
| Aleksandr Smirnov | Communists and Working Russia - for the Soviet Union | 15,400 | 5.44% |
| Stanislav Parkhomenko | Liberal Democratic Party | 13,043 | 4.60% |
| Yelena Bacheva | Independent | 9,996 | 3.53% |
| Valentin Markovsky | My Fatherland | 9,584 | 3.38% |
| Aleksey Chernykh | Forward, Russia! | 8,599 | 3.04% |
| Sergey Russkikh | Independent | 3,988 | 1.41% |
| Vladimir Noskov | Independent | 2,356 | 0.83% |
| Gennady Musalimov | Independent | 989 | 0.35% |
| Nikolay Pozdeyev | Independent | 826 | 0.29% |
| against all | | 24,305 | 8.58% |
| Total | | 283,260 | 100% |

=== 1999 ===
Summary of the 19 December 1999 Russian legislative election in the Sverdlovsky constituency
| Candidate | Party | Votes | % |
|---|---|---|---|
| Viktor Pokhmelkin (incumbent) | Union of Right Forces | 63,386 | 22.40% |
| Sergey Levitan | Independent | 51,677 | 18.27% |
| Lyubov Zotina | Yabloko | 24,271 | 8.58% |
| Ivan Yurov | Communist Party | 23,973 | 8.47% |
| Nina Anikina | Independent | 22,569 | 7.98% |
| Vitaly Zelenkin | Independent | 15,834 | 5.60% |
| Vladimir Durbazhev | Independent | 12,320 | 4.35% |
| Aleksandr Belorusov | Independent | 9,283 | 3.28% |
| Igor Korolev | Independent | 6,255 | 2.21% |
| Vladimir Ilyinykh | Independent | 6,102 | 2.16% |
| Andrey Mishkin | Liberal Democratic Party | 4,121 | 1.46% |
| against all | | 35,921 | 12.70% |
| Total | | 282,922 | 100% |

=== 2003 ===
Summary of the 7 December 2003 Russian legislative election in the Sverdlovsky constituency
| Candidate | Party | Votes | % |
|---|---|---|---|
| Viktor Pokhmelkin (incumbent) | New Course — Automobile Russia | 60,952 | 22.34% |
| Aleksey Chernov | Union of Right Forces | 46,299 | 16.97% |
| Oleg Borovik | People's Party | 25,907 | 9.49% |
| Anastasia Maltseva | Independent | 19,993 | 7.33% |
| Mikhail Kasimov | Yabloko | 19,732 | 7.23% |
| Sergey Levitan | Independent | 19,138 | 7.01% |
| Anatoly Kholoimov | Liberal Democratic Party | 7,219 | 2.65% |
| Dmitry Chumachenko | Independent | 6,488 | 2.38% |
| Konstantin Lezhnev | Independent | 2,543 | 0.93% |
| Stanislav Otmakhov | Independent | 1,336 | 0.49% |
| against all | | 55,234 | 20.24% |
| Total | | 273,501 | 100% |

=== 2016 ===
Summary of the 18 September 2016 Russian legislative election in the Chusovoy constituency
| Candidate | Party | Votes | % |
|---|---|---|---|
| Aleksey Burnashov | United Russia | 80,904 | 45.50% |
| Irina Volynets | A Just Russia | 19,518 | 10.98% |
| Yevgeny Sivtsev | Liberal Democratic Party | 17,928 | 10.08% |
| Gennady Storozhev | Communist Party | 15,315 | 8.61% |
| Yury Pimkin | Communists of Russia | 10,515 | 5.91% |
| Irina Sadilova | Yabloko | 9,599 | 5.40% |
| Raisa Simonova | People's Freedom Party | 3,431 | 1.93% |
| Stepan Podaruyev | Rodina | 2,654 | 1.49% |
| Aleksey Ruban | Patriots of Russia | 2,632 | 1.48% |
| Total | | 177,797 | 100% |

=== 2021 ===
Summary of the 17-19 September 2021 Russian legislative election in the Chusovoy constituency
| Candidate | Party | Votes | % |
|---|---|---|---|
| Roman Vodyanov | United Russia | 56,091 | 30.51% |
| Marina Zimina | Communist Party | 32,883 | 17.89% |
| Irina Zlobina | A Just Russia — For Truth | 27,004 | 14.69% |
| Oleg Postnikov | Liberal Democratic Party | 20,960 | 11.40% |
| Aleksey Ivchansky | New People | 15,145 | 8.24% |
| Aleksey Mikhaylov | Communists of Russia | 10,898 | 5.93% |
| Svetlana Ivanova | Yabloko | 5,268 | 2.86% |
| Total | | 183,843 | 100% |

=== 2026 ===
Summary of the 18-20 September 2026 Russian legislative election in the Chusovoy constituency
| Candidate | Party | Votes | % |
|---|---|---|---|
| Roman Vodyanov (incumbent) | United Russia | 90,659 | 42.49% |
| Ksenia Aytakova | Communist Party | 33,588 | 15.74% |
| Sergey Isayev | Liberal Democratic Party | 18,612 | 8.72% |
| Andrey Lyashkov | New People | 14,852 | 6.96% |
| Yegor Yermakov | Yabloko | 14,018 | 6.57% |
| Andrey Kobelev | A Just Russia | 13,311 | 6.24% |
| Galina Avtukhovich | Party of Pensioners | 11,492 | 5.39% |
| Yury Sirdyuchenko | Communists of Russia | 5,795 | 2.72% |
| Total | | 213,362 | 100% |
