= Osiński =

Osiński (feminine: Osińska; plural: Osińscy) is a Polish-language surname. Russian-language variant: Osinsky.

The surname may refer to:

- Christine Osinski (born 1948), American photographer
- Dan Osinski (1933–2013), American baseball player
- Jan Osiński (1975–2010), Polish Roman Catholic priest
- Jerzy Osiński (1906–1982), Polish aviator
- Jerzy Osiński (politician) (born 1936), Polish politician
- Ludwik Osiński (1775–1838), Polish writer and official
- Marek Osinski, American electrical engineer
- Maximilian Osinski (born 1984), American actor
- Michael Osinski (born 1954), American computer programmer
- Michał Osiński (born 1978), Polish footballer
- Natalia Osińska, Polish novelist
- Samuel Osiński (died 1649), Polish-Lithuanian noble
- Winand Osiński (1913–2006), Polish long-distance runner

== See also ==
- Osinsky
