= Kondratovo =

Kondratovo (Russian: Кондратово) is the name of several rural localities in Russia:

- Kondratovo, Perm Krai, village in Permsky District, Perm Krai
- Kondratovo, Babayevsky District, Vologda Oblast, village in Babayevsky District, Vologda Oblast
- Kondratovo, Kichmengsko-Gorodetsky District, Vologda Oblast, village in Kichmengsko-Gorodetsky District, Vologda Oblast
