= Kudymkar constituency =

Legislative constituency in Russia

Kudymkar single-member constituency
- Constituency of the Russian State Duma

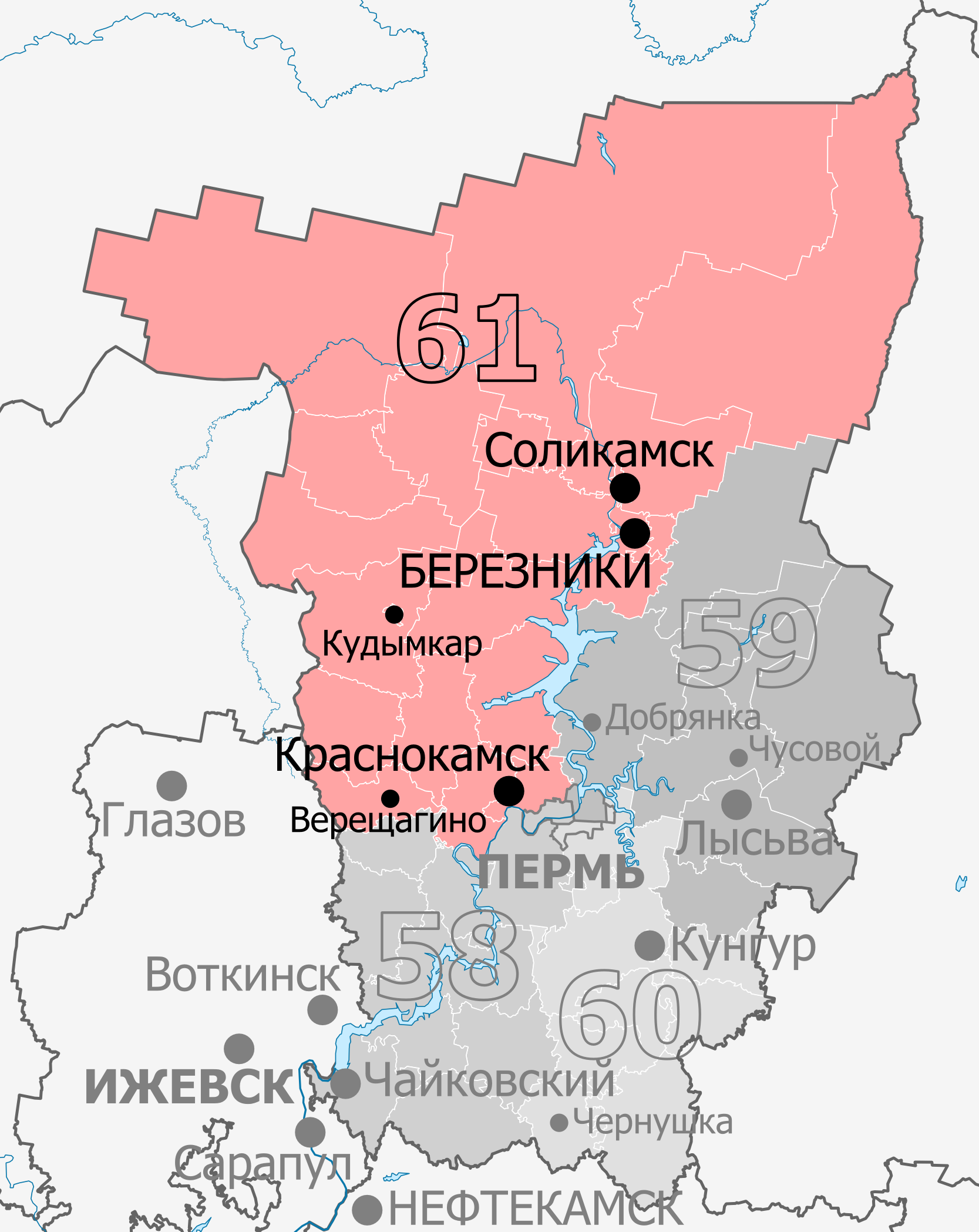
- Constituency boundaries since 2016
- Deputy: Oleg Kalinsky; United Russia
- Federal subject: Perm Krai
- Districts: Berezniki, Cherdynsky, Gaynsky, Ilyinsky, Karagaysky, Kochyovsky, Kosinsky, Krasnovishersky, Krasnokamsk, Kudymkar, Kudymkarsky, Nytvensky, Sivinsky, Solikamsk, Solikamsky, Usolsky, Vereshchaginsky, Yurlinsky, Yusvinsky
- Voters: 455,273 (2026)

The Kudymkar constituency (No.66 (Note: Berezniki constituency No.137 in 1993–2007, No.61 in 2016–2026)) is a Russian legislative constituency in Perm Krai. The constituency covers northern Perm Krai, comprising nearly half of the entire region.

The constituency has been represented since 2026 by United Russia deputy Oleg Kalinsky, former Member of Legislative Assembly of Perm Krai and Uralkali executive, who won the open seat after one-term United Russia incumbent Irina Ivenskikh successfully sought re-election in Kungur constituency.

== Boundaries ==
1993–2003 Berezniki constituency: Alexandrovsk, Berezniki, Cherdynsky District, Chusovoy, Gornozavodsky District, Gremyachinsk, Gubakha, Kizel, Krasnovishersky District, Solikamsk, Solikamsky District, Usolsky District
The constituency covered the entirety of northern and eastern Perm Oblast, including the towns of Alexandrovsk, Berezniki, Gremyachinsk, Gubakha, Kizel and Solikamsk.

2003–2007 Berezniki constituency: Alexandrovsk, Berezniki, Cherdynsky District, Chusovoy, Dobryanka, Dobryansky District, Gornozavodsky District, Gremyachinsk, Gubakha, Kizel, Krasnovishersky District, Solikamsk, Solikamsky District, Usolsky District
After the 2003 redistricting the constituency was slightly changed, gaining Dobryanka and Dobryansky District from Sverdlovsky constituency.

2016–present: Berezniki, Cherdynsky District, Gaynsky District, Ilyinsky District, Karagaysky District, Kochyovsky District, Kosinsky District, Krasnovishersky District, Krasnokamsk, Kudymkar, Kudymkarsky District, Nytvensky District, Sivinsky District, Solikamsk, Solikamsky District, Usolsky District, Vereshchaginsky District, Yurlinsky District, Yusvinsky District
The constituency was re-created under the name "Kudymkar constituency" for the 2016 election in Perm Krai, which was created by the merger of Perm Oblast and Komi-Permyak Autonomous Okrug in 2005. This seat retained northern Perm Krai, losing eastern part of the region to Chusovoy constituency. Instead the constituency gained western Perm Krai from Leninsky and Kungur constituencies as well as the entirety of the dissolved Komi-Permyak constituency.

== Members elected ==
Election	Member	Party
1993	Vladimir Kravtsov	Independent
1995	Valentin Stepankov	Independent
1999	Valentina Savostyanova	Independent
2003	Valentina Savostyanova	Party of Russia's Rebirth-Russian Party of Life
2007	Proportional representation - no election by constituency	
2011	Proportional representation - no election by constituency	
2016	Dmitry Sazonov	United Russia
2021	Irina Ivenskikh	United Russia
2026	Oleg Kalinsky	United Russia

== Election results ==
=== 1993 ===
Summary of the 12 December 1993 Russian legislative election in the Berezniki constituency
Candidate	Party	Votes	%
Vladimir Kravtsov	Independent	79,432	35.31%
Sergey Sysuyev	Independent	45,805	20.36%
Vladislav Sukhoplyuyev	Independent	23,748	10.56%
Valentin Tatarchuk	Independent	23,422	10.41%
against all		31,511	14.01%
Total		224,983	100%

=== 1995 ===
Summary of the 17 December 1995 Russian legislative election in the Berezniki constituency
Candidate	Party	Votes	%
Valentin Stepankov	Independent	106,374	39.65%
Sergey Novozhilov	Liberal Democratic Party	33,643	12.54%
Vladimir Kravtsov (incumbent)	Independent	31,815	11.86%
Galina Shamsina	Independent	27,510	10.25%
Yury Pastukhov	Yabloko	19,698	7.34%
Tatyana Arkhipenko	Forward, Russia!	16,217	6.05%
against all		28,049	10.46%
Total		268,266	100%

=== 1999 ===
Summary of the 19 December 1999 Russian legislative election in the Berezniki constituency
Candidate	Party	Votes	%
Valentina Savostyanova	Independent	52,394	20.12%
Gennady Belkin	Independent	45,164	17.34%
Aleksey Tokarev	Union of Right Forces	44,663	17.15%
Valentin Stepankov (incumbent)	Fatherland – All Russia	43,351	16.65%
Konstantin Kurchenkov	Independent	19,779	7.60%
Yury Perkhun	Communist Party	16,450	6.32%
Viktor Yaburov	Our Home – Russia	5,344	2.05%
against all		28,314	10.87%
Total		260,399	100%

=== 2003 ===
Summary of the 7 December 2003 Russian legislative election in the Berezniki constituency
Candidate	Party	Votes	%
Valentina Savostyanova (incumbent)	Party of Russia's Rebirth-Russian Party of Life	109,810	35.45%
Aleksandr Kamenskikh	Independent	105,774	34.15%
Aleksey Tokarev	Independent	20,676	6.67%
Lyubov Gribova	Independent	11,773	3.80%
Oleg Plotnikov	Liberal Democratic Party	10,340	3.34%
against all		46,208	14.92%
Total		310,189	100%

=== 2016 ===
Summary of the 18 September 2016 Russian legislative election in the Kudymkar constituency
Candidate	Party	Votes	%
Dmitry Sazonov	United Russia	62,859	38.22%
Tatyana Kamenskikh	Liberal Democratic Party	23,606	14.35%
Darya Eisfeld	A Just Russia	22,637	13.77%
Irina Filatova	Communist Party	18,400	11.19%
Olga Kolokolova	Yabloko	10,153	6.17%
Vitaly Tytyanevich	Communists of Russia	8,095	4.92%
Valentin Murzayev	People's Freedom Party	2,686	1.63%
Total		164,447	100%

=== 2021 ===
Summary of the 17-19 September 2021 Russian legislative election in the Kudymkar constituency
Candidate	Party	Votes	%
Irina Ivenskikh	United Russia	48,250	25.17%
Ksenia Aytakova	Communist Party	30,901	16.12%
Grigory Malinin	A Just Russia — For Truth	26,446	13.80%
Dmitry Gromov	Party of Pensioners	16,774	8.75%
Andrey Zakharov	Liberal Democratic Party	15,950	8.32%
Lyudmila Averkina	Communists of Russia	15,055	7.86%
Aleksey Ovchinnikov	New People	14,186	7.40%
Olga Kolokolova	Yabloko	5,273	2.75%
Total		191,661	100%

=== 2026 ===
Summary of the 18-20 September 2026 Russian legislative election in the Kudymkar constituency
Candidate	Party	Votes	%
Oleg Kalinsky	United Russia	100,631	43.82%
Oleg Postnikov	Liberal Democratic Party	25,241	10.99%
Anton Tyutyunnikov	Communist Party	23,791	10.36%
Yury Utochkin	A Just Russia	21,246	9.25%
Olga Kolokolova	Yabloko	17,626	7.68%
Aleksey Gribanov	Party of Pensioners	15,984	6.96%
Jadwiga Veklich	Communists of Russia	13,487	5.87%
Total		229,643	100%
