= 2000 Russian gubernatorial elections =

- 26 March – 24 December 2000

41 Heads of Federal Subjects from 89
- 2000 Russian regional elections: Gubernatorial (or head of subject) Gubernatorial (of another subject) Two gubernatorial elections (including one of another subject) Gubernatorial and legislative Gubernatorial and legislative (both of another subject) Legislative Legislative (of another subject) Referendum Referendum and gubernatorial

Gubernatorial elections in 2000 took place in 41 regions of the Russian Federation. Four years after the campaign of 1996 nearly a half of 89 governors' seats were contested again.

In January, the second rounds of the December 1999 elections took place in Moscow, Novosibirsk and Tver Oblasts. In seven regions, the elections were moved to the federal election day on 26 March 2000 due to cost reasons. In October 2000, the last parliamentary republic in the Russian Federation, Udmurtia, elected its first president.

== Race summary ==
Federal subject	Incumbent	Incumbent since	Election day	Candidates	Result
Moscow Oblast	see 1999 elections		9 January (runoff)	see 1999 elections	
Novosibirsk Oblast	see 1999 elections		9 January (runoff)	see 1999 elections	
Tver Oblast	see 1999 elections		9 January (runoff)	see 1999 elections	
Altai Krai (snap election)	Alexander Surikov	1996	26 March	✓ Alexander Surikov 77.22%; Vladimir Rayfikesht 10.91%; Sergey Sannikov 4.14%	Incumbent re-elected.
Kirov Oblast (snap election)	Vladimir Sergeyenkov	1996	26 March	✓ Vladimir Sergeyenkov 58.03%; Andrey Alpatov 15.03%; Valentin Pervakov 11.42%; Against all 7.89%	Incumbent re-elected.
Murmansk Oblast (snap election)	Yury Yevdokimov	1996	26 March	✓ Yury Yevdokimov 86.71%; Yevgeny Komarov 3.37%	Incumbent re-elected.
Saratov Oblast (snap election)	Dmitry Ayatskov	1996	26 March	✓ Dmitry Ayatskov 67.26%; Igor Karaulov 9.62%; Against all 20.32%	Incumbent re-elected.
Jewish AO (snap election)	Nikolay Volkov	1991	26 March	✓ Nikolay Volkov 56.76%; Boris Korsunsky 25.71%; Against all 11.15%	Incumbent re-elected.
Khanty-Mansi AO (snap election)	Alexander Filipenko	1991	26 March	✓ Alexander Filipenko 90.82%; Against all 5.94%	Incumbent re-elected.
Yamalo-Nenets AO (snap election)	Yury Neyolov	1994	26 March	✓ Yury Neyolov 88.10%; Against all 7.72%	Incumbent re-elected.
Saint Petersburg	Vladimir Yakovlev	1996	14 May	✓ Vladimir Yakovlev (endorsed by OVR, Unity, CPRF) 72.69%; Igor Artemyev (Yabloko) 14.68%; Yury Boldyrev 3.79%; Artyom Tarasov 3.59%	Incumbent re-elected.
Samara Oblast (snap election)	Konstantin Titov (resigned); Yury Logoydo (acting)	1991	2 July	✓ Konstantin Titov (SPS/RPSD) 53.25%; Viktor Tarkhov (backed by CPRF/NPSR, Yabloko) 29.23%; Gennady Zvyagin (NDR) 9.08%	Former governor re-elected.
Udmurtia	none (Note: Presidency was introduced as a result of 26 March 2000 referendum. At the moment of election, Nikolay Ganza served as prime minister (appointed by the State Council) and Alexander Volkov served as chairman of the State Council.)	—N/a	15 October	✓ Alexander Volkov 37.84%; Pavel Vershinin 23.93%; Nikolay Ganza 12.28%; Andrey Soluyanov 12.17%; Against all 9.48%	New president elected to a vacant position.
Sakhalin Oblast	Igor Farkhutdinov	1995	22 October	✓ Igor Farkhutdinov 56.29%; Fyodor Sidorenko (endorsed by NPSR, SPS) 21.36%; Anatoly Chyorny 8.36%; Against all 6.93%	Incumbent re-elected.
Kursk Oblast	Alexander Rutskoy	1996	22 October (first round)	Alexander Mikhailov (CPRF/NPSR) 39.52%; Viktor Surzhikov 21.58%; Sergey Maltsev 8.42%; Vladimir Stekachev 7.28%; Nikolay Greshilov 6.16%; Against all 12.26%	Incumbent removed from ballot. New governor elected.
Kursk Oblast	Alexander Rutskoy	1996	5 November (runoff)	✓ Alexander Mikhailov (CPRF/NPSR) 55.54%; Viktor Surzhikov 37.93%; Against all 5.43%	Incumbent removed from ballot. New governor elected.
Chita Oblast	Ravil Geniatulin	1996	29 October	✓ Ravil Geniatulin (backed by Unity, Fatherland, CPRF) 57.02%; Viktor Voytenko 16.25%; Nikolay Goncharov 15.55%; Against all 5.59%	Incumbent re-elected.
Agin-Buryat AO (snap election)	Bair Zhamsuyev	1997	29 October	✓ Bair Zhamsuyev 89.34%; Babu-Dorzhi Bazarov 2.67%	Incumbent re-elected.
Magadan Oblast	Valentin Tsvetkov	1996	5 November	✓ Valentin Tsvetkov 62.76%; Vladimir Butkeyev 14.13%; Vladimir Markov 8.69%; Against all 8.89%	Incumbent re-elected.
Kaliningrad Oblast	Leonid Gorbenko	1996	5 November (first round)	Vladimir Yegorov 37.56%; Leonid Gorbenko 21.54%; Vladimir P. Nikitin 15.81%; Yury Sinelnik 12.78%; Against all 7.21%	Incumbent lost re-election. New governor elected.
Kaliningrad Oblast	Leonid Gorbenko	1996	19 November (runoff)	✓ Vladimir Yegorov 56.47%; Leonid Gorbenko 33.71%; Against all 8.4%	Incumbent lost re-election. New governor elected.
Kaluga Oblast	Valery Sudarenkov	1996	12 November	✓ Anatoly Artamonov (backed by Unity, CPRF) 56.72%; Aleksey Demichev 15.85%; Valery Artyomov 7.88%; Against all 10.03%	Incumbent retired. New governor elected.
Pskov Oblast	Yevgeny Mikhailov	1996	12 November	✓ Yevgeny Mikhailov (Unity) 28.01%; Viktor Bibikov (Fatherland) 15.12%; Mikhail Kuznetsov 15.04%; Vladimir S. Nikitin (CPRF) 14.53%; Mikhail Bryachak 6.40%; Vladimir Sidorenko (APR) 5.16%; Against all 6.20%	Incumbent re-elected.
Ust-Orda Buryat AO	Valery Maleyev	1996	19 November	✓ Valery Maleyev 53.67%; Kuzma Aldarov 32.00%; Against all 5.27%	Incumbent re-elected.
Kurgan Oblast	Oleg Bogomolov	1996	26 November (first round)	Oleg Bogomolov (Unity) 43.23%; Nikolay Bagretsov 22.05%; Lev Yefremov 16.64%; Anatoly Koltashov 5.49%; Against all 8.45%	Incumbent re-elected.
Kurgan Oblast	Oleg Bogomolov	1996	10 December (runoff)	✓ Oleg Bogomolov (Unity) 50.38%; Nikolay Bagretsov 42.47%; Against all 5.87%	Incumbent re-elected.
Krasnodar Krai	Nikolai Kondratenko	1996	3 December	✓ Alexander Tkachov (backed by CPRF, APR, Unity) 81.78%; Igor Kramarenko 5.23%; Against all 7.09%	Incumbent retired. New governor elected.
Astrakhan Oblast	Anatoly Guzhvin	1991	3 December	✓ Anatoly Guzhvin 81.82%; Aleksandr Mikhaylov 6.04%; Against all 5.84%	Incumbent re-elected.
Perm Oblast	Gennady Igumnov	1996	3 December	✓ Yury Trutnev 51.48%; Gennady Igumnov 34.95%; Pavel Anokhin 5.62%	Incumbent lost re-election. New governor elected.
Koryak AO	Valentina Bronevich	1996	3 December	✓ Vladimir Loginov 50.68%; Valentina Bronevich 32.99%; Sergey Lyoushkin 5.13%	Incumbent lost re-election. New governor elected.
Mari El	Vyacheslav Kislitsyn	1996	3 December (first round)	Leonid Markelov (LDPR) 29.21%; Vyacheslav Kislitsyn (CPRF) 25.19%; Ivan Teterin (backed by Unity) 18.82%; Anatoly Ivanov 9.43%	Incumbent lost re-election. New president elected.
Mari El	Vyacheslav Kislitsyn	1996	17 December (runoff)	✓ Leonid Markelov (LDPR) 58.23%; Vyacheslav Kislitsyn (CPRF) 33.40%; Against all 6.90%	Incumbent lost re-election. New president elected.
Stavropol Krai	Alexander Chernogorov	1996	3 December (first round)	Alexander Chernogorov (CPRF/NPSR) 28.58%; Stanislav Ilyasov 19.00%; Mikhail Kuzmin 17.55%; Aleksandr Shiyanov 13.36%; Against all 6.00%	Incumbent re-elected.
Stavropol Krai	Alexander Chernogorov	1996	17 December (runoff)	✓ Alexander Chernogorov (CPRF/NPSR) 56.57%; Stanislav Ilyasov 36.33%; Against all 6.07%	Incumbent re-elected.
Arkhangelsk Oblast	Anatoly Yefremov	1996	3 December (first round)	Anatoly Yefremov 49.70%; Nikolay Malakov 34.26%; Against all 12.06%	Incumbent re-elected.
Arkhangelsk Oblast	Anatoly Yefremov	1996	17 December (runoff)	✓ Anatoly Yefremov 58.50%; Nikolay Malakov 31.59%; Against all 8.85%	Incumbent re-elected.
Ivanovo Oblast	Vladislav Tikhomirov	1996	3 December (first round)	Vladimir Tikhonov (CPRF/NPSR) 48.54%; Anatoly Golovkov (Fatherland, Unity) 32.32%; Pavel Pozhigailo 5.20%; Against all 8.16%	Incumbent retired. New governor elected.
Ivanovo Oblast	Vladislav Tikhomirov	1996	17 December (runoff)	✓ Vladimir Tikhonov 62.36%; Anatoly Golovkov 33.08%	Incumbent retired. New governor elected.
Kamchatka Oblast	Vladimir Biryukov	1991	3 December (first round)	Boris Sinchenko 27.76%; Mikhail Mashkovtsev (CPRF/NPSR) 20.00%; Georgy Greshnykh 15.78%; Valery Dorogin 14.75%; Against all 12.22%	Incumbent retired. New governor elected.
Kamchatka Oblast	Vladimir Biryukov	1991	17 December (runoff)	✓ Mikhail Mashkovtsev (CPRF/NPSR) 45.83%; Boris Sinchenko 42.49%; Against all 10.39%	Incumbent retired. New governor elected.
Ryazan Oblast	Vyacheslav Lyubimov	1996	3 December (first round)	Vyacheslav Lyubimov (CPRF/NPSR) 40.09%; Valery Ryumin 12.36%; Vladimir Markov 10.15%; Nikolay Bulayev 9.22%; Pyotr Zabaluyev 7.17%; Mikhail Malakhov 5.62%: Against all 7.26%	Incumbent re-elected.
Ryazan Oblast	Vyacheslav Lyubimov	1996	17 December (runoff)	✓ Vyacheslav Lyubimov (CPRF/NPSR) 65.14%; Valery Ryumin 26.82%; Against all 6.97%	Incumbent re-elected.
Komi-Permyak AO	Nikolay Poluyanov	1991	3 December (first round)	Gennady Savelyev 27.14%; Nikolay Poluyanov (Unity) 24.23%; Valery Vankov (endorsed by NPSR) 11.04%; Anatoly Fedoseyev 10.00%; Against all 17.81%	Incumbent lost re-election. New governor elected.
Komi-Permyak AO	Nikolay Poluyanov	1991	17 December (runoff)	✓ Gennady Savelyev 44.25%; Nikolay Poluyanov (Unity) 40.09%; Against all 13.11%	Incumbent lost re-election. New governor elected.
Khabarovsk Krai	Viktor Ishayev	1991	10 December	✓ Viktor Ishayev (Unity) 87.84%; Svetlana Zhukova 6.32%	Incumbent re-elected.
Bryansk Oblast	Yury Lodkin	1996	10 December	✓ Yury Lodkin (CPRF/NPSR) 29.21%; Nikolay Denin (endorsed by Unity) 21.15%; Yury Demochkin 15.82%; Viktor Malashenko 7.30%; Yury D. Lodkin 6.45%; Aleksandr Denin 5.40%; Against all 6.90%	Incumbent re-elected.
Vladimir Oblast	Nikolay Vinogradov	1996	10 December	✓ Nikolay Vinogradov (CPRF/NPSR, endorsed by Unity, OVR) 65.58%; Yury Vlasov (endorsed by SPS, Yabloko) 15.98%; Against all 11.20%	Incumbent re-elected.
Kostroma Oblast	Viktor Shershunov	1996	10 December (first round)	Viktor Shershunov 43.74%; Boris Korobov (endorsed by Unity) 23.08%; Nikolay Romanov 14.49%; Against all 13.26%	Incumbent re-elected.
Kostroma Oblast	Viktor Shershunov	1996	24 December (runoff)	✓ Viktor Shershunov 63.09%; Boris Korobov 24.61%; Against all 10.62%	Incumbent re-elected.
Khakassia	Aleksey Lebed	1996	24 December	✓ Aleksey Lebed (endorsed by OVR, NPSR) 71.23%; Vasily Astanayev (APR) 13.48%; Against all 5.48%	Incumbent re-elected.
Chelyabinsk Oblast	Pyotr Sumin	1996	24 December	✓ Pyotr Sumin (endorsed by NPSR, Unity) 58.68%; Mikhail Grishankov 17.15%; Valery Gartung 14.26%	Incumbent re-elected.
Ulyanovsk Oblast	Yury Goryachev	1992	24 December	✓ Vladimir Shamanov (endorsed by NPSR, Unity) 56.26%; Yury Goryachev 23.58%; Sergey Ryabukhin 11.54%	Incumbent lost re-election. New governor elected.
Volgograd Oblast	Nikolay Maksyuta	1996	24 December	✓ Nikolay Maksyuta (CPRF/NPSR) 36.72%; Oleg Savchenko 28.31%; Yury Chekhov (endorsed by OVR) 11.12%; Anatoly Popov 9.67%; Against all 5.46%	Incumbent re-elected.
Voronezh Oblast	Ivan Shabanov	1996	24 December	✓ Vladimir Kulakov 59.99%; Ivan Shabanov (CPRF/NPSR) 15.21%; Aleksandr N. Gusev 12.16%; Against all 8.10%	Incumbent lost re-election. New governor elected.
Chukotka	Aleksandr Nazarov	1991	24 December	✓ Roman Abramovich 90.61%; Vladimir Yetylin 3.21%	Incumbent retired. New governor elected.

== Literature ==
- Ivanov, Vitaly (2020). Глава субъекта Российской Федерации. История губернаторов. Том I. История. Книга II [Head of the subject of the Russian Federation. History of governors. Volume I: History. Book II] (in Russian). Archived from the original on 2020-07-04.
