= Chastye =

Chastye (Russian: Частые) is the name of several rural localities in Russia:

- Chastye, Chastinsky District, Perm Krai, a selo in Chastinsky District of Perm Krai
- Chastye, Kishertsky District, Perm Krai, a village in Kishertsky District of Perm Krai
- Chastye, Pskov Oblast, a village in Kunyinsky District of Pskov Oblast
