= Vodyanov =

Vodyanov or Vodianov (Russian: Водянов) is a Russian masculine surname; its feminine counterpart is Vodyanova or Vodianova. It may refer to the following notable people:

- Natalia Vodianova (born 1982), Russian model and actress
- Roman Vodyanov (born 1982), Russian politician
