= Komi-Permyak constituency =

Russian legislative constituency

Komi-Permyak single-member constituency
- Constituency of the Russian State Duma

- Constituency boundaries from 1993 to 2007
- Deputy: None
- Federal subject: Komi-Permyak Autonomous Okrug
- Districts: Gaynsky, Kochyovsky, Kosinsky, Kudymkar, Kudymkarsky, Yurlinsky, Yusvinsky
- Voters: 94,233 (2003)

The Komi-Permyak constituency (No.216) was a Russian legislative constituency in the Komi-Permyak Autonomous Okrug in 1993–2007. It encompassed the entire territory of Komi-Permyak Autonomous Okrug. The seat was last occupied by United Russia faction member Andrey Klimov, a businessman, who defeated two-term incumbent State Duma member Anna Vlasova in the 1999 election.

The constituency was dissolved in 2007 when State Duma adopted full proportional representation for the next two electoral cycles. Earlier in 2005 Komi-Permyak Autonomous Okrug was merged with Perm Oblast to form Perm Krai. Currently the territory of the former Komi-Permyak constituency is part of the Kudymkar constituency.

== Boundaries ==
1993–2007: Gaynsky District, Kochyovsky District, Kosinsky District, Kudymkar, Kudymkarsky District, Yurlinsky District, Yusvinsky District
The constituency had been covering the entirety of Komi-Permyak Autonomous Okrug since its initial creation in 1993.

== Members elected ==
Election	Member	Party
1993	Anna Vlasova	Independent
1995	Anna Vlasova	Independent
1999	Andrey Klimov	Independent
2003	Andrey Klimov	Independent

== Election results ==
=== 1993 ===
==== Declared candidates ====
- David Lipman (Independent), forestry industry lobbyist
- Tatyana Mikhaylova (Independent), Kudymkar administration legal counsel
- Vladimir Shipitsyn (Independent), energy executive
- Galina Vasilyeva (Independent), union leader
- Anna Vlasova (Independent), Chairwoman of the Komi-Permyak Autonomous Okrug Committee on Economy (1990–present)
- Leonid Zlobin (Independent), television executive

==== Results ====
Summary of the 12 December 1993 Russian legislative election in the Komi-Permyak constituency
Candidate	Party	Votes	%
Anna Vlasova	Independent	11,378	19.43%
Vladimir Shipitsyn	Independent	7,941	13.56%
David Lipman	Independent	7,842	13.40%
Leonid Zlobin	Independent	7,457	12.74%
Galina Vasilyeva	Independent	5,921	10.11%
Tatyana Mikhaylova	Independent	4,958	8.47%
against all		7,939	13.56%
Total		58,544	100%

=== 1995 ===
Results by district: Anna Vlasova 20–30%; Gennady Savelyev 20–30%; Vasily Zhizhilev 50–60%

==== Declared candidates ====
- Aleksandr Popov (LDPR), Perm State Medical Academy production chief
- Gennady Savelyev (Independent), First Deputy Governor of Komi-Permyak Autonomous Okrug (1992–present)
- Vladimir Shipitsyn (Independent), energy executive, 1993 candidate for this seat
- Sergey Systerov (Independent), bank manager
- Nikolay Troshev (Independent), Deputy Chairman of the Komi-Permyak Autonomous Okrug Department of Education and Science
- Valery Vankov (Independent), former First Deputy Chairman of the Komi-Permyak Autonomous Okrug Executive Committee (1988–1992)
- Anna Vlasova (Independent), incumbent Member of State Duma (1994–present)
- Mikhail Vodyanov (Independent), Member of Federation Council (1994–present)
- Andrey Yablokov (PRES), journalist
- Vladimir Yarusov (Independent), public utilities executive
- Vasily Zhizhelev (Independent), Kochyovsky District central hospital chief doctor

==== Results ====
Summary of the 17 December 1995 Russian legislative election in the Komi-Permyak constituency
Candidate	Party	Votes	%
Anna Vlasova (incumbent)	Independent	13,386	21.15%
Gennady Savelyev	Independent	11,612	18.35%
Vasily Zhizhilev	Independent	7,369	11.64%
Valery Vankov	Independent	5,936	9.38%
Mikhail Vodyanov	Independent	4,701	7.43%
Vladimir Shipitsyn	Independent	3,868	6.11%
Aleksandr Popov	Liberal Democratic Party	2,426	3.83%
Sergey Systerov	Independent	1,782	2.82%
Nikolay Troshev	Independent	1,733	2.74%
Vladimir Yarusov	Independent	1,245	1.97%
Andrey Yablokov	Party of Russian Unity and Accord	798	1.26%
against all		7,164	11.32%
Total		63,295	100%

=== 1999 ===
==== Declared candidates ====
- Aleksandr Chetin (Independent), community activist, son of Chairman of the Duma of the Komi-Permyak Autonomous Okrug Ivan Chetin
- Andrey Gavrilov (Independent), legal counsel
- Vladimir Ivanov (DN), party official
- Vasily Khrulev (Independent), regional consumers union chairman
- Andrey Klimov (Independent), Member of Legislative Assembly of Perm Oblast (1994–present), businessman
- Vitaly Kozlovsky (Independent), Member of Duma of the Komi-Permyak Autonomous Okrug (1994–present), Komi-Permyak Okrug hospital chief doctor
- Vasily Myasnikov (KRO-Boldyrev), Internal Troops of Russia commander assistant
- Mikhail Pyankov (Independent), businessman
- Leonid Rassada (Independent), militsiya officer
- Ivan Storozhev (Independent), construction details plant director
- Marina Tyusheva (Independent), Komi-Permyak Autonomous Okrug Administration official
- Anna Vlasova (RSP), incumbent Member of State Duma (1994–present)

==== Did not file ====
- Aleksandr Zykin (Independent)

==== Results ====
Summary of the 19 December 1999 Russian legislative election in the Komi-Permyak constituency
Candidate	Party	Votes	%
Andrey Klimov	Independent	36,537	60.21%
Vitaly Kozlovsky	Independent	5,417	8.93%
Anna Vlasova (incumbent)	Russian Socialist Party	4,146	6.83%
Vasily Khrulev	Independent	2,731	4.50%
Leonid Rassada	Independent	1,630	2.69%
Marina Tyusheva	Independent	1,012	1.67%
Mikhail Pyankov	Independent	883	1.46%
Aleksandr Chetin	Independent	816	1.34%
Vasily Myasnikov	Congress of Russian Communities-Yury Boldyrev Movement	802	1.32%
Ivan Storozhev	Independent	762	1.26%
Vladimir Ivanov	Spiritual Heritage	582	0.96%
Andrey Gavrilov	Independent	268	0.44%
against all		3,737	6.16%
Total		60,686	100%

=== 2003 ===
==== Declared candidates ====
- Aleksandr Anisimov (VR–ES), former Chairman of the Kudymkarsky District Executive Committee
- Yury Bykov (CPRF), engineer
- Aleksandr Chetin (Independent), community activist, son of Chairman of the Duma of the Komi-Permyak Autonomous Okrug Ivan Chetin, 1999 candidate for this seat
- Andrey Klimov (Independent), incumbent Member of State Duma (2000–present)
- Mikhail Kodanyov (Independent), chairman of the Liberal Russia party (2002–present, disputed), 1997 and 2001 Komi Republic head candidate
- Anatoly Nikitasenko (Independent), nonprofit president
- Oleg Sedykh (Independent), heating unit controller

==== Did not file ====
- Marta Magilevskaya (Independent), journalist
- Vladislav Shinkevich (Independent), businessman

==== Results ====
Summary of the 7 December 2003 Russian legislative election in the Komi-Permyak constituency
Candidate	Party	Votes	%
Andrey Klimov (incumbent)	Independent	37,925	62.74%
Anatoly Nikitasenko	Independent	6,277	10.38%
Mikhail Kodanyov	Independent	4,724	7.82%
Yury Bykov	Communist Party	4,441	7.35%
Aleksandr Anisimov	Great Russia – Eurasian Union	771	1.28%
Aleksandr Chetin	Independent	516	0.85%
Oleg Sedykh	Independent	193	0.32%
against all		4,542	7.51%
Total		60,453	100%
