= Valentin Stepankov =

Russian prosecutor general

- Валентин Степанков
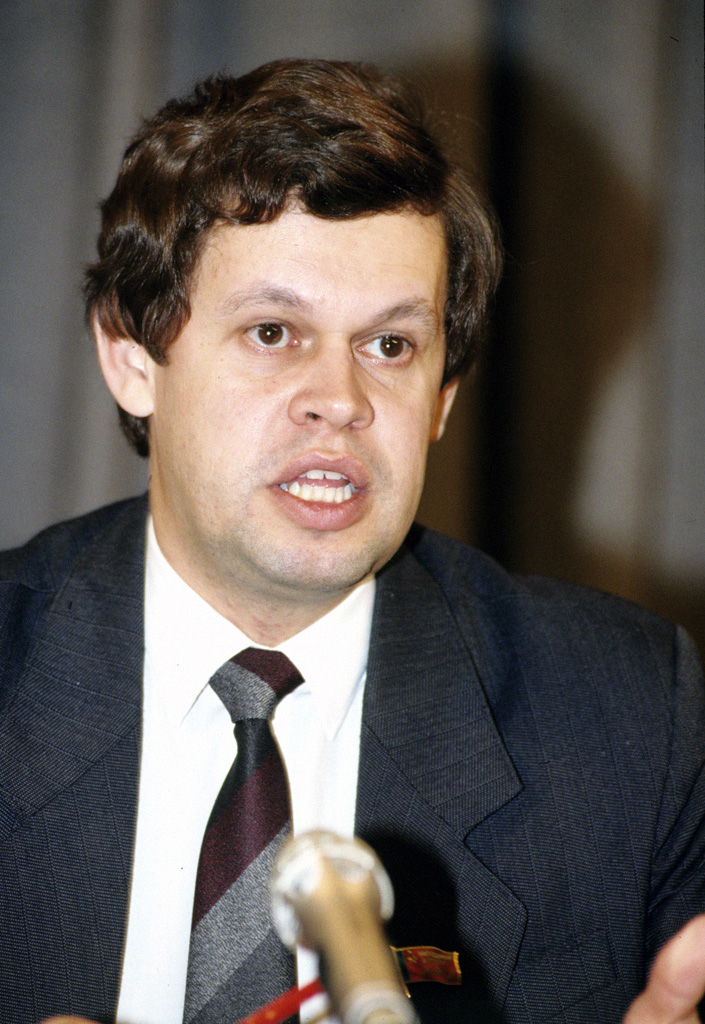
- Stepankov in 1991

1st Prosecutor-General of Russia
- In office 28 February 1991 – 5 October 1993
- President: Boris Yeltsin
- Preceded by: Nikolai Trubin (as Prosecutor of the RSFSR)
- Succeeded by: Alexey Kazannik

Member of the State Duma for Berezniki constituency
- In office 17 January 1996 – 24 December 1999

Personal details
- Born: 17 September 1951 (age 75) Molotov, Russian SFSR, Soviet Union (now Perm, Russia)
- Education: Perm State University
- Valentin Stepankov's voice From the Echo of Moscow Program, 4 October 2011

Valentin Georgiyevich Stepankov (Russian: Валентин Георгиевич Степанков; born 17 September 1951) is the first prosecutor general of the Russian Federation.

He once condemned an action by Boris Yeltsin in 1993, in which Russia faced a constitutional crisis.

He has also served as Russia's deputy natural resources minister. Before that he was deputy secretary on the Security Council, but in 2004 he switched from the Council to natural resources administration.
