= Valentina Savostyanova =

Russian politician (1948–2026)

- Валентина Савостьянова

Member of the State Duma for Kudymkar
- In office 18 January 2000 – 24 December 2007

Personal details
- Born: Valentina Borisovna Savostyanova; 21 September 1948 Stalino, Ukrainian SSR, Soviet Union
- Died: 7 April 2026 (aged 77) Perm, Russia
- Party: Party of Russia's Rebirth; Russian Party of Life
- Education: Moscow State University; Russian Presidential Academy of National Economy and Public Administration
- Occupation: Lawyer

Valentina Borisovna Savostyanova (Russian: Валенти́на Бори́совна Савостья́нова; 21 September 1948 – 7 April 2026) was a Russian politician. A member of the Party of Russia's Rebirth and the Russian Party of Life, she served in the State Duma from 2000 to 2007.

Savostyanova died in Perm on 7 April 2026, at the age of 77.
