= Alexey Kazannik =

Russian lawyer and politician (1941–2019)

- Алексей Казанник
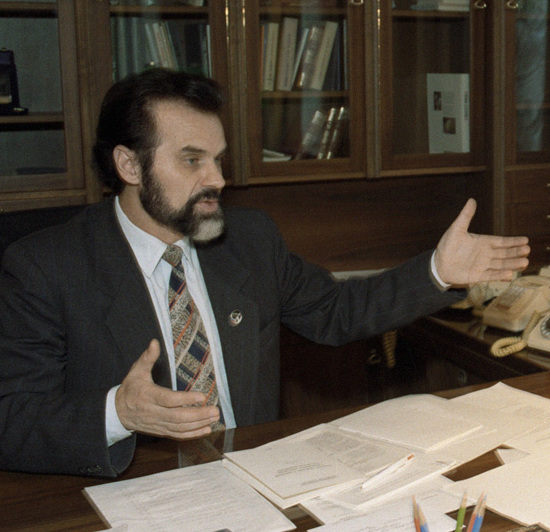
- Kazannik in 1993

Deputy Governor of Omsk Oblast
- In office 12 March 1995 – 30 September 2003
- Governor: Leonid Polezhayev

Prosecutor-General of Russia
- In office 5 October 1993 – 14 March 1994
- President: Boris Yeltsin
- Preceded by: Valentin Stepankov
- Succeeded by: Yury Skuratov

Personal details
- Born: 26 July 1941 Perepis, Horodnia Raion, Chernihiv Oblast, Ukrainian SSR, Soviet Union
- Died: 2 June 2019 (aged 77) Omsk, Russia
- Education: Irkutsk State University

Alexey Ivanovich Kazannik (Russian: Алексе́й Ива́нович Каза́нник; 26 July 1941 – 2 June 2019) was a Russian lawyer and politician.

== Biography ==
Kazannik was born on 26 July 1941 in Perepis, which was then part of the Ukrainian SSR, into a large peasant ethnically Ukrainian family. He soon after lost both his father and two older brothers, who died on the Eastern Front of World War II. His mother raised him alone with his three other remaining siblings during the Nazi occupation of Ukraine. In 1959 he went to the Kazakh SSR where he worked as a carpenter in the construction department "Zhilstroy" of the Kazmetallurgstory trust in Temirtau. Kazannik would later state his determination to become a lawyer came from his time working in the Kazakh SSR, as he witnessed the mass riots in 1959 of local workers against a metallurgical plant that was promptly dispersed. In 1960 he served in the Soviet Army in military engineering.

He then, in 1963, entered the Faculty of Law at Irkutsk State University where he graduated from in 1967 and then entered graduate school at in 1968. In 1975 he moved to Omsk and became an associate professor of the Department of Labor, Economics, and Agricultural Law of the Omsk State University, which he did until 1991.

In 1989, he gained notability for granting his seat in the Supreme Soviet of the Soviet Union to Boris Yeltsin. Between 1993 and 1994, Kazannik was Prosecutor-General of Russia. Kazannik later served as Deputy Governor of Omsk Oblast from 1995 to 2003. Additionally, he taught law at Omsk State University.

Kazannik died following a long illness on 2 June 2019 in Omsk, at the age of 77.
