= Ural Oblast (1923–1934) =

Administrative division in USSR from 1923 to 1934

Ural Oblast Уральская область (Russian)
- Oblast of the Russian SFSR
- 1923–1934
- Ural Oblast in 1925
- Capital: Sverdlovsk
- Area
- 1,659,000 km^{2} (641,000 sq mi)
- Population
- 6,380,000
- History
  - Established: 1923
  - Disestablished: 1934
- Political subdivisions: okrugs and rayons, number of them was often changed
Preceded by
Perm Governorate
Yekaterinburg Governorate
Tyumen Governorate
Chelyabinsk Governorate
Succeeded by
Komi-Permyak Autonomous Okrug
Khanty-Mansi Autonomous Okrug
Yamalo-Nenets Autonomous Okrug
Sverdlovsk Oblast
Chelyabinsk Oblast

The Ural Oblast (Russian: Уральская область) was an oblast of the Russian SFSR within the USSR. It was created November 3, 1923 by the merger of Perm, Yekaterinburg, Chelyabinsk and Tyumen Governorates. The capital of the oblast was Sverdlovsk. At the time of its creation area of oblast was 1,659,000 km^{2} and the population was 6,380,000.

On February 26, 1925, Komi-Permyak Okrug was separated from the western portion of the oblast.

In 1927, the oblast was divided into 16 okrugs and 210 rayons. Okrugs included: Verkhne-Kamsky, Zlatoustovsky, Irbitsky, Ishimsky, Komi-Permyatsky, Kungursky, Kurgansky, Permsky, Sarapulsky, Sverdlovsky, Tagilsky, Tobolsky, Troitsky, Tyumensky, Chelyabinsky and Shadrinsky. Borders between okrugs and rayons often changed.

On August 8, 1930, okrugs were abolished. On December 10, 1930, Ostyak-Vogul and Yamal (Nenets) national okrugs were created in the northern part of former Tobolsky okrug. On January 17, 1934, the oblast was abolished and was replaced by Sverdlovsk, Chelyabinsk and Ob-Irtysh oblasts. At the end of 1933, the oblast's area was 1,896,000 km^{2}.

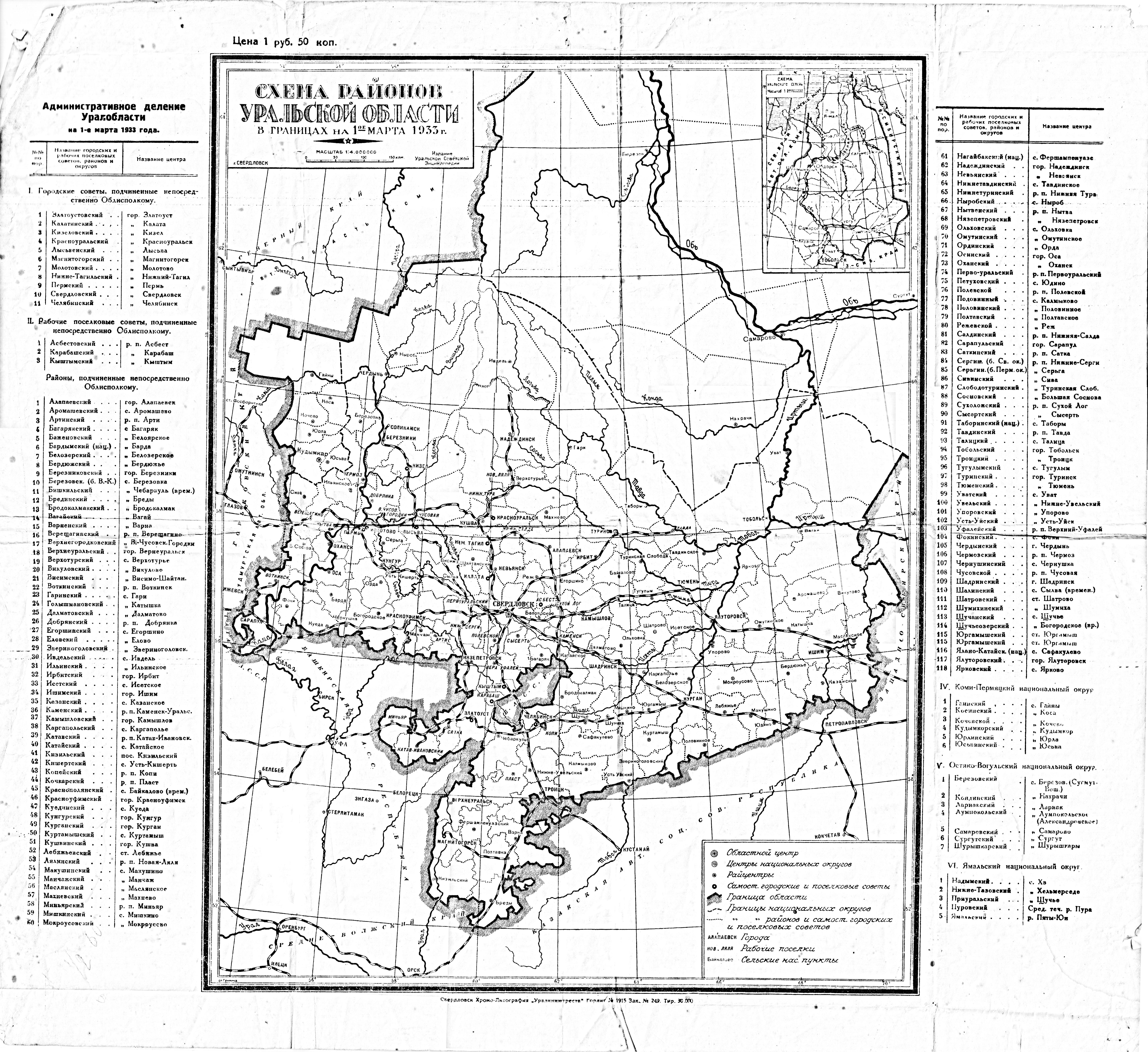
Districts of the Ural Oblast on March 1, 1933
