= Roman Vodyanov =

Russian politician

- Роман Водянов
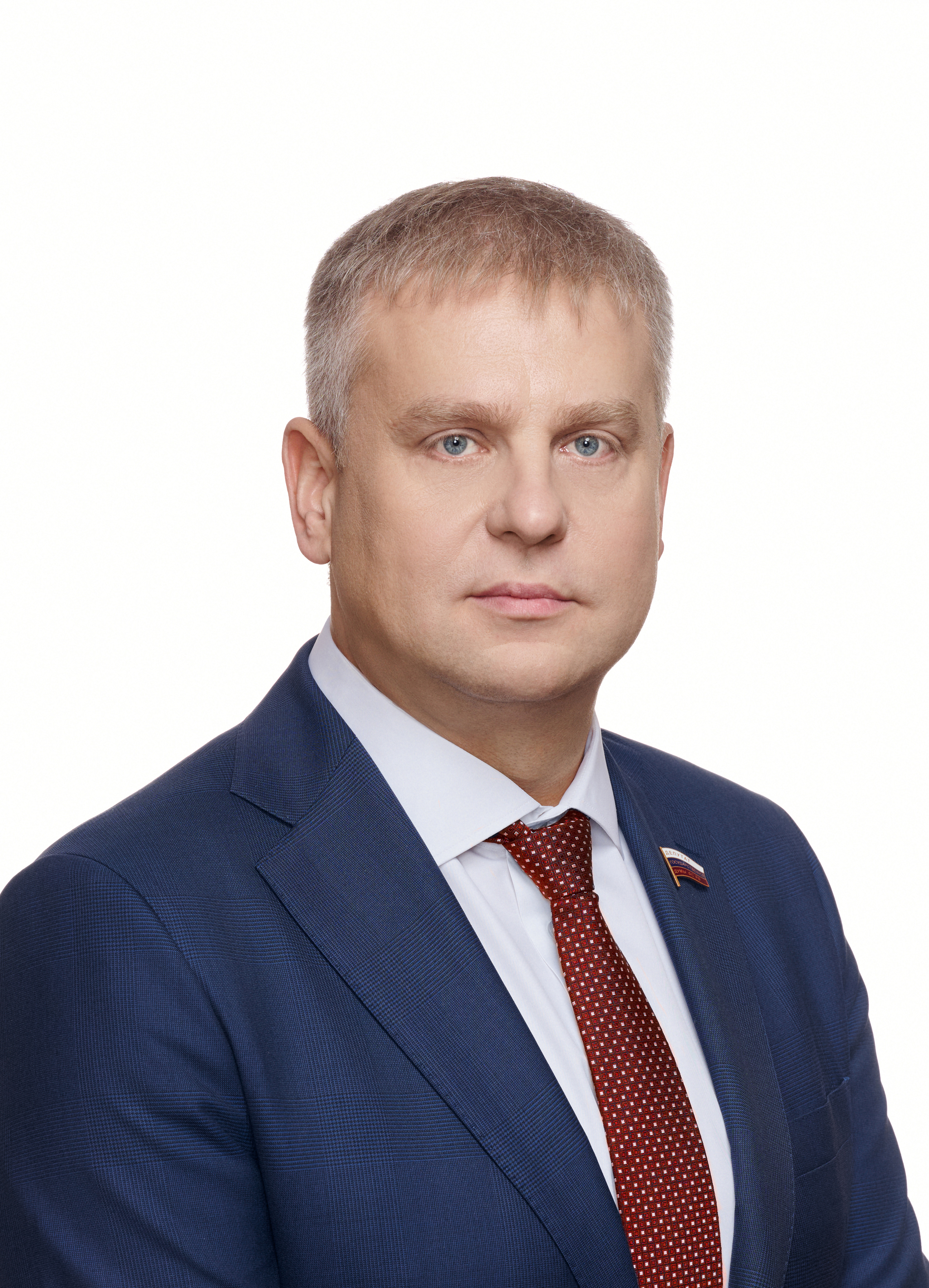

Member of the State Duma for Perm Krai
- Incumbent
- Assumed office 12 October 2021
- Preceded by: Aleksey Burnashov
- Constituency: Chusovoy (No. 59)

Personal details
- Born: 25 November 1982 (age 43) Kudymkar, Komi-Permyak Autonomous Okrug, Perm Oblast, Russian SFSR, USSR
- Party: United Russia
- Spouse: Marina Talgatovna
- Children: 6
- Education: Moscow State University of Economics, Statistics, and Informatics
- Website: (in Russian)

Roman Mikhailovich Vodyanov (Russian: Роман Михайлович Водянов; born 25 November 1982, Kudymkar) is a Russian political figure and a deputy of the 8th State Duma.

In 2008, Vodyanov founded and headed the Uralbur company. From 2013 to 2014, he was the deputy of the Dvurechenskoye rural settlement. In 2014-2016, he was the deputy of the Zemsky Assembly of the Perm Municipal District. From 2016 to 2021, he was elected to the Legislative Assembly of Perm Krai. In 2020, he was appointed Advisor to the Acting Governor of Perm Krai Dmitry Makhonin. Since September 2021, he has served as deputy of the 8th State Duma.
