= Igor Shubin =

Russian politician (born 1955)

- Игорь Шубин
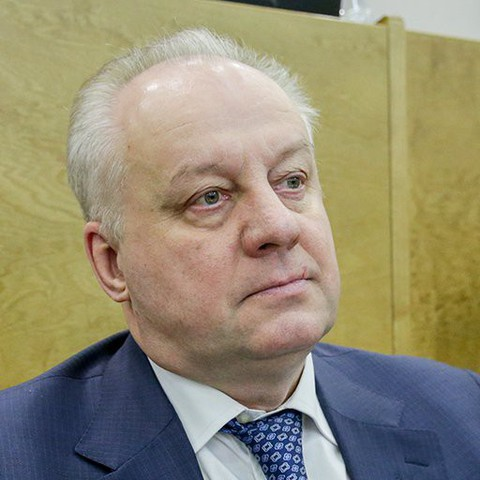
- Shubin in 2018

Member of the State Duma for Perm Krai
- Incumbent
- Assumed office 5 October 2016
- Preceded by: constituency re-established
- Constituency: Perm (No. 58)

Member of the Federation Council - representative from the legislative body of state power of the Perm Krai
- In office 26 December 2010 – 5 October 2016
- Succeeded by: Aleksey Pushkov

Mayor of Perm
- In office 29 November 2005 – 26 December 2010
- Preceded by: Arkady Kamenev
- Succeeded by: Igor Sapko

Legislative Assembly of the Perm Oblast
- In office December 2001 – 29 November 2005

Personal details
- Born: 20 December 1955 (age 70) Perm, Russian SFSR, USSR
- Party: United Russia
- Education: Perm State University

Igor Nikolaevich Shubin (Russian: Игорь Николаевич Шубин; 20 December 1955, Perm) is a Russian political figure, former mayor of Perm, deputy of the 7th and 8th State Dumas.

From 1974 to 1977, Shubin served at the Soviet Navy. From 1983 to 1992, he worked at the district executive committee of the Dzerzhinsky City District. In 1990, he became the deputy of the Perm City Council of People's Deputies. From 1992 to 1994, he headed the administration of the Dzerzhinsky City District. From 1994 to 2001, Shubin was the Deputy Governor of Perm Krai. From 2001 to 2005, he was the deputy of the Legislative Assembly of Perm Oblast of the 3rd convocation. He left the post in 2005 to become the mayor of Perm. From 2011 to 2012, he was the deputy of the Legislative Assembly of Perm Krai of the 2nd convocation. From 2012 to 2016, he was a member of the Federation Council. In 2016, he was elected deputy of the 7th State Duma. Since September 2021, he has served as deputy of the 8th State Duma.

On 22 May 2018 the Perm City Duma discussed the opportunity to give Shubin a title of an Honorary Citizen. However, out of 24 deputies, the majority either voted against or abstained from voting.

== Sanctions ==
He was sanctioned by the UK government in 2022 in relation to the Russo-Ukrainian War.

== Awards ==
- Order of Friendship
