= Gennady Savelyev =

- Геннадий Савельев

2nd Governor of Komi-Permyak Autonomous Okrug
- In office 26 December 2000 – 1 December 2005
- Preceded by: Nikolay Poluyanov
- Succeeded by: Office abolished

Personal details
- Born: 11 November 1945 (age 80) Korchevnya, Komi-Permyak National Okrug, Perm Oblast, Russian SFSR, Soviet Union
- Party: A Just Russia

Gennady Petrovich Savelyev (Russian: Геннадий Петрович Савельев; born 11 November 1945), is a Russian politician who had served as the 2nd and last head of administration (governor) of Komi-Permyak Autonomous Okrug before that region's unification to Perm Krai on 1 December 2005.

== Biography ==
Gennady Savelyev was born in Korchevnya, Kudymkarsky District on 11 November 1945.

In 1973, he graduated from the Faculty of Physical Education of the Perm State Pedagogical Institute. He worked in Gayny as a PE teacher and later principal of Gayny high school. In 1985, he graduated from the Faculty of Economics and Organization of Agriculture of the Perm Agricultural Institute. In the 1990s, Savelyev moved to Kudymkar. In 1992, he was appointed deputy head of Komi-Permyak Autonomous Okrug administration for economy.

In December 1995, Savelyev participated in the election for the 2nd State Duma in the Komi-Permyak constituency, losing to incumbent Anna Vlasova. In December 1997, he was elected to the Legislative Assembly of Perm Oblast representing Kudymkar.

On 17 December 2000, Savelyev won the election of the head of Komi-Permyak administration, having received 44% of the votes, and defeating Nikolay Poluyanov, whom he had 40% of the votes.

Savelyev's administration supervised the process of unification of Komi-Permyak Autonomous Okrug and Perm Oblast, initiated by then-governor Yury Trutnev. Initially, Savelyev expressed his negative attitude towards the merger of regions. The agreement, signed in November 2003, established that Komi-Permyakia would enjoy special status within Perm Krai.

On 1 December 2005, Perm Oblast and Komi-Permyak Autonomous Okrug, have unified into Perm Krai, having the office of the subject abolished.
