= Dmitry Skrivanov =

Russian politician

- Дмитрий Скриванов
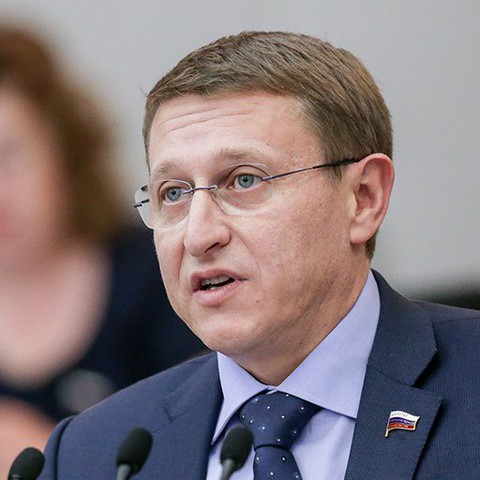

Member of the State Duma for Perm Krai
- Incumbent
- Assumed office 5 October 2016
- Preceded by: constituency re-established
- Constituency: Kungur (No. 60)

Personal details
- Born: 15 August 1971 (age 55) Novocherkassk, Russian SFSR, USSR
- Party: United Russia
- Spouse: Natalia Viacheslavovna
- Children: 2 daughters
- Education: Perm State University

Dmitry Stanislavovich Skrivanov (Russian: Дмитрий Станиславович Скриванов; 15 August 1971, Novocherkassk, Skovorodinsky District) is a Russian political figure, deputy of the 7th and 8th State Dumas.

In the 1990s, Skrivanov engaged in private legal practice in the economic sphere. On 26 March 2000 he was elected deputy of the Legislative Assembly of Perm Krai of the 2nd convocation. He was re-elected in 2001 and 2006. From 2008 to 2012, Skrivanov headed the United Russia branch in the Perm Krai. In 2016 and 2021, he was elected for the 7th and 8th State Dumas, respectively.

== Sanctions ==
He was sanctioned by the UK government in 2022 in relation to the Russo-Ukrainian War.
