= Motovilikhinsky City District =

District of Perm, Perm Krai, Russia

Coordinates: 58.0333°N 56.3333°E

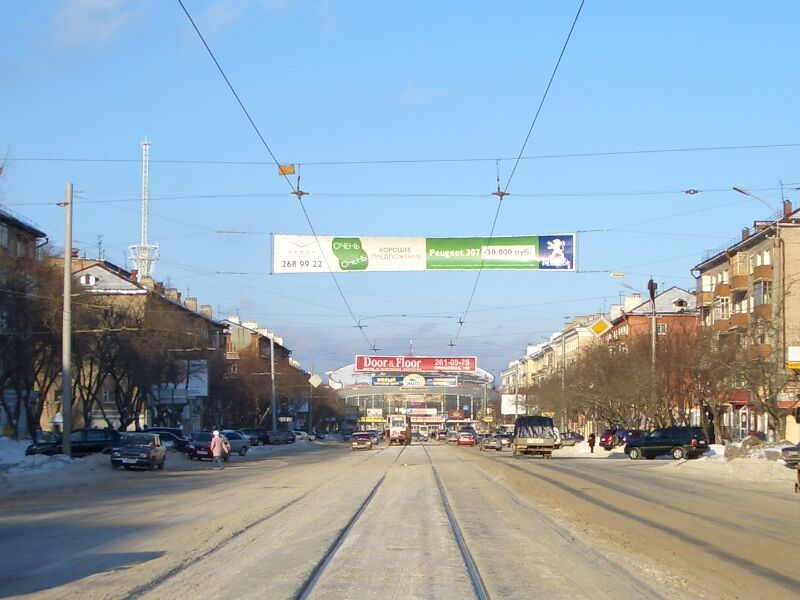
Krupskaya Street

Motovilikhinsky District in Perm

Motovilikhinsky City District (Russian: Мотови́лихинский район) is one of the seven city districts of the city of Perm in Perm Krai, Russia. Population: 179,961 (2010 Census); 176,564 (2002 Census); 181,605 (1989 Soviet census). It is the second most populous city district of Perm (after Sverdlovsky City District). On 13 June 1918, Grand Duke Michael Alexandrovich of Russia was murdered in a local forest.

== 2018 Perm school stabbing ==
The 2018 Perm school stabbing was a school stabbing in the Motovilikhinsky City District in Perm, Russia occurred on the morning of January 15, 2018. 16-year-old former student Lev Bijakov and tenth-grader Alexander Buslidze attacked students and a teacher with knives, after which they attempted suicide. As a result of the attack, 15 people were injured, including the perpetrators.

== Geography ==
The city district is situated on both banks of the Kama River. Two other rivers flowing through it are the Iva and the Yegoshikha.

== Economy ==
The city district is the location of the Joint Stock Venture Motovilikha Plants (ОАО "Мотовилихинские заводы"), a prominent metallurgical and military equipment manufacturer.
