= Osinsky District =

District name

Location of Irkutsk Oblast in Russia

Location of Perm Krai in Russia

Osinsky District is the name of several administrative and municipal districts in Russia:

- Osinsky District, Irkutsk Oblast, an administrative and municipal district of Irkutsk Oblast
- Osinsky District, Perm Krai, an administrative and municipal district of Perm Krai

== See also ==
- Osinsky (disambiguation)
