= Kondratovo, Kichmengsko-Gorodetsky District, Vologda Oblast =

Kondratovo Кондратово
- Village
- Location within Vologda Oblast Location within Russia
- Coordinates: 59°47′N 45°29′E
- Country: Russia
- Region: Vologda Oblast
- District: Kichmengsko-Gorodetsky District
- Time zone: UTC+3:00

Kondratovo (Russian: Кондратово) is a rural locality (a village) in Kichmegnskoye Rural Settlement, Kichmengsko-Gorodetsky District, Vologda Oblast, Russia. The population was 75 as of 2002.

== Geography ==
Kondratovo is located 32 km southwest of Kichmengsky Gorodok (the district's administrative centre) by road. Kurilovo is the nearest rural locality.
