= Zaboloto =

Zaboloto Заболото
- Village
- Location within Perm Krai Location within Russia
- Coordinates: 57°56′N 55°45′E
- Country: Russia
- Region: Perm Krai
- District: Permsky District
- Time zone: UTC+5:00

Zaboloto (Russian: Заболото) is a rural locality (a village) in Zabolotskoye Rural Settlement, Permsky District, Perm Krai, Russia. The population was 26 as of 2010. There are 10 streets.

== Geography ==
Zaboloto is located 40 km southwest of Perm (the district's administrative centre) by road. Gorshki is the nearest rural locality.
