= Bolshoye Savino =

Bolshoye Savino Большое Савино
- Village
- Location within Perm Krai Location within Russia
- Coordinates: 57°55′N 56°00′E
- Country: Russia
- Region: Perm Krai
- District: Permsky District
- Time zone: UTC+5:00

Bolshoye Savino (Russian: Большое Савино) is a rural locality (a village) in Savinskoye Rural Settlement, Permsky District, Perm Krai, Russia. The population was 675 as of 2010. There are 17 streets.

== Geography ==
Bolshoye Savino is located 18 km southwest of Perm (the district's administrative centre) by road. Krokhovo is the nearest rural locality.
