= Korchevnya =

Korchevnya Корчевня
- Village
- Location within Perm Krai Location within Russia
- Coordinates: 59°06′N 54°53′E
- Country: Russia
- Region: Perm Krai
- District: Kudymkarsky District
- Time zone: UTC+5:00

Korchevnya (Russian: Корчевня) is a rural locality (a village) in Yorgvinskoye Rural Settlement, Kudymkarsky District, Perm Krai, Russia. The population was 332 as of 2010. There are 12 streets.

== Geography ==
Korchevnya is located 20 km northeast of Kudymkar (the district's administrative centre) by road. Rodina is the nearest rural locality.
