= Marek Osinski =

American electrical engineer

Marek Osinski is an electrical engineer at the University of New Mexico in Albuquerque. He was named a Fellow of the Institute of Electrical and Electronics Engineers (IEEE) in 2015 for his contributions to the analysis of optoelectronic materials and devices.
