= Nizhny Palnik =

Nizhny Palnik Нижний Пальник
- Selo
- Location within Perm Krai Location within Russia
- Coordinates: 57°37′N 56°18′E
- Country: Russia
- Region: Perm Krai
- District: Permsky District
- Time zone: UTC+5:00

Nizhny Palnik (Russian: Нижний Пальник) is a rural locality (a selo) and the administrative center of Palnikovskoye Rural Settlement, Permsky District, Perm Krai, Russia. The population was 787 as of 2010. There are 19 streets.

== Geography ==
Nizhny Palnik is located on the Babka River, 59 km south of Perm (the district's administrative centre) by road. Chelyaba is the nearest rural locality.
