= Leninsky City District, Perm =

Coordinates: 58.0333°N 56.2167°E

Leninsky District in Perm

Leninsky City District (Russian: Ле́нинский райо́н) is one of the seven city districts of the city of Perm in Perm Krai, Russia. Population: 48,520 (2010 Census); 57,569 (2002 Census); 74,622 (1989 Soviet census). It is the least populous city district of Perm.

== Name ==
The city district is named after Vladimir Lenin, a Russian revolutionary and politician and the founder of the Soviet state.

On October 4, 1954, in the center of Komsomolsky garden in front of Perm Academic Opera and Ballet Theater, the monument to Lenin was installed. The author of this monument was Soviet sculptor Georgy Neroda, a corresponding member of USSR Academy of Arts.

== Geography ==
The city district is situated on both banks of the Kama River. The part on the right bank is sparsely populated and mostly covered by forest. The city center is situated on the left bank of Kama.

== Largest streets ==
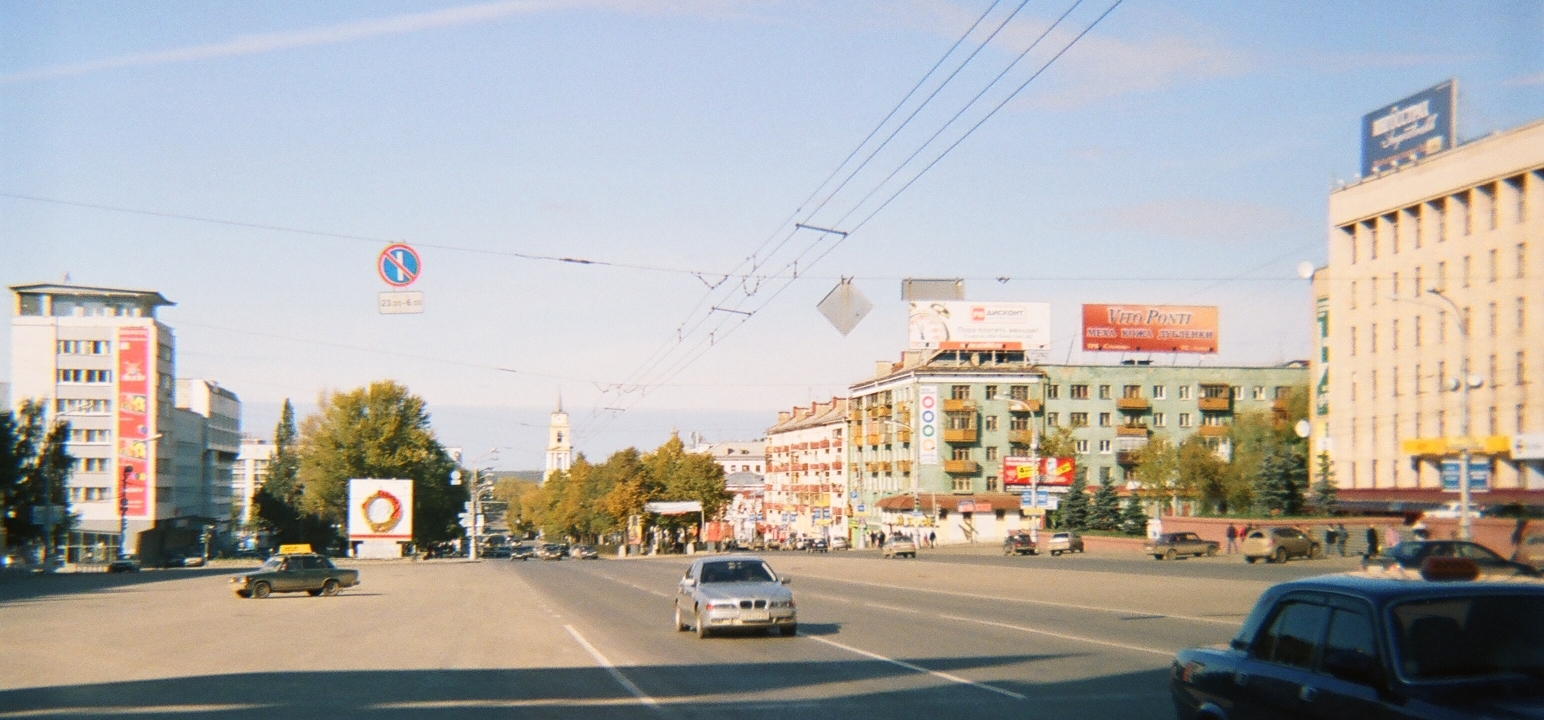
Oktyabrskaya Square and Komsomolsky Avenue

- Lenina Street (Улица Ленина)
- Komsomolsky Avenue (Комсомольский проспект)

== Establishments ==
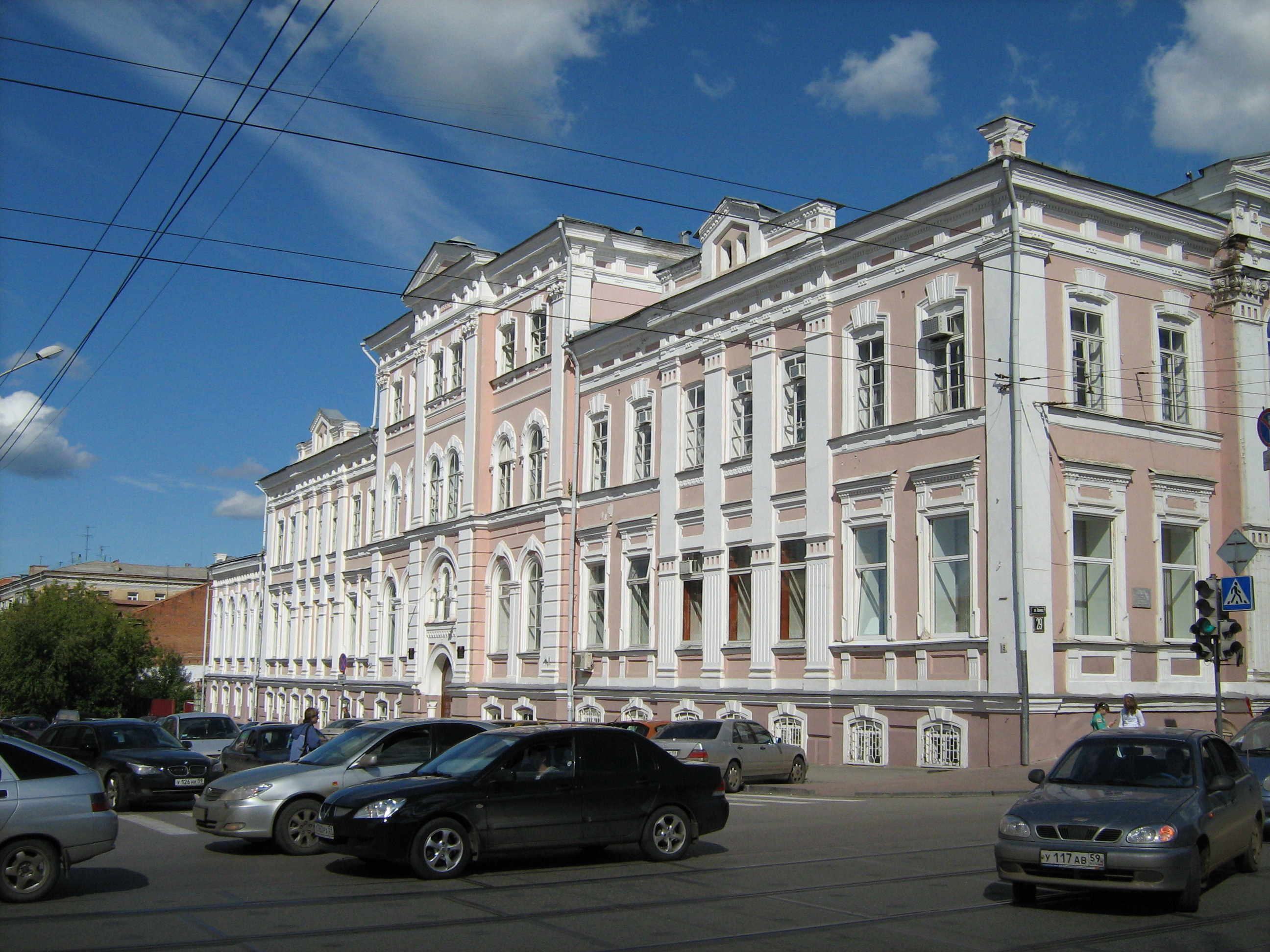
Perm State Institute of Arts and Culture

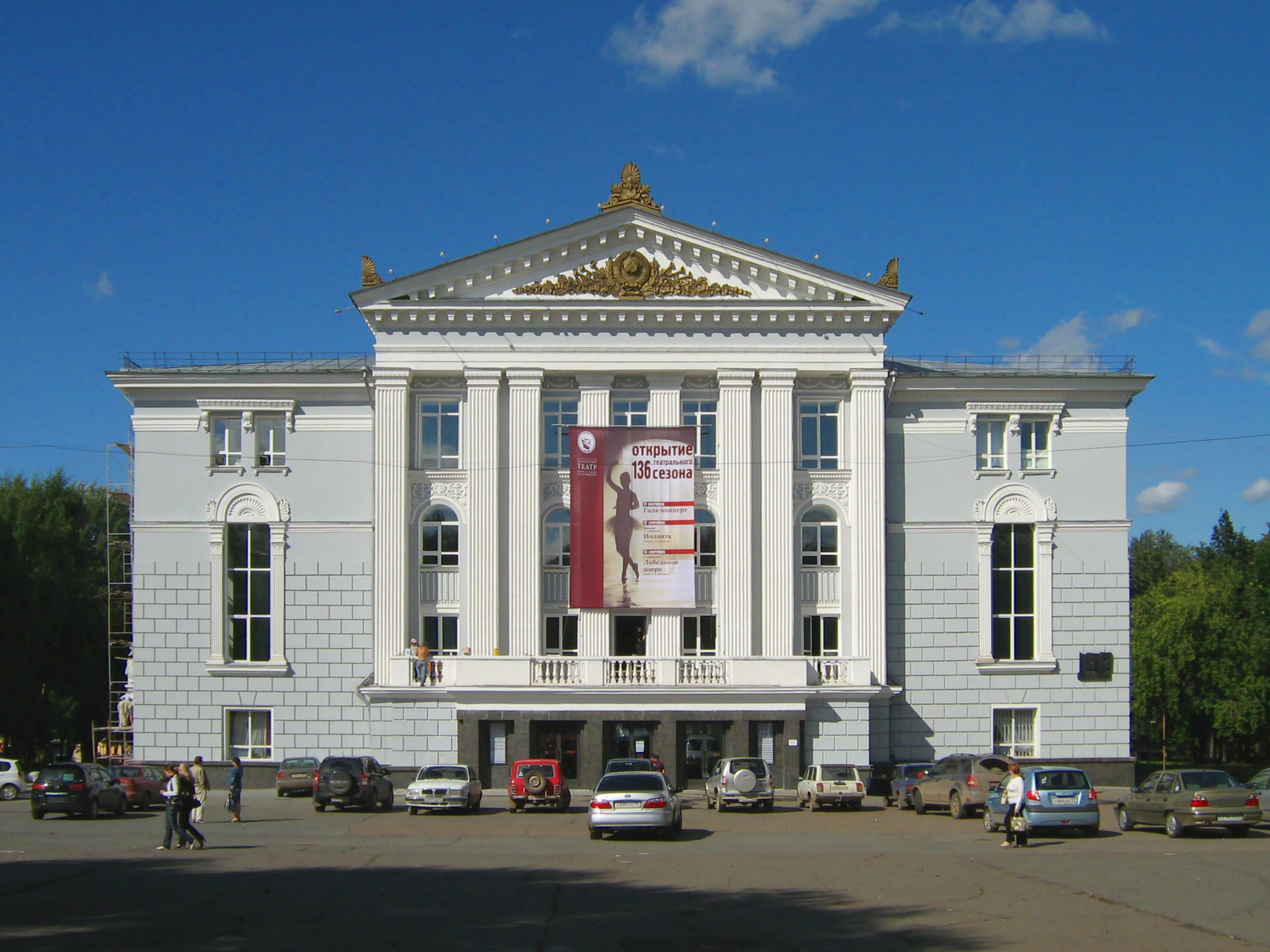
Perm Academic Opera and Ballet Theater

Educational establishments:

- Perm State Technical University (Russian: Пермский государственный технический университет);
- Perm State Institute of Arts and Culture (Russian: Пермский государственный институт искусств и культуры).

Theatres:

- Perm Academic Opera and Ballet Theater (Russian: Пермский академический театр оперы и балета);
- Perm Academic Drama Theater (Russian: Пермский академический театр драмы).
