= Nikolay Poluyanov =

Russian politician

- Николай Полуянов
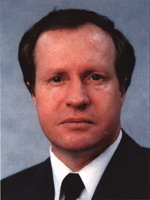

1st Head of Administration of Komi-Permyak Autonomous Okrug
- In office 14 December 1991 – 26 December 2000
- Preceded by: Office established
- Succeeded by: Gennady Savelyev

Member of the Federation Council of Russia
- In office January 1996 – January 2001

Personal details
- Born: 14 July 1952 (age 74) Parfyonovo, Perm Oblast, Russian SFSR, Soviet Union
- Education: Perm State University

Nikolay Andreyevich Poluyanov (Russian: Николай Андреевич Полуянов; born 14 July 1952) is a Russian politician who served as the first governor of Komi-Permyak Autonomous Okrug from 1991 to 2000.

He has also served as a member of the Federation Council of Russia.

== Biography ==
Nikolay Poluyanov was born on 14 July 1952 in the village of Parfyonovo, Kudymkarsky District, Perm Oblast.

=== Education and work ===
He graduated from Perm Financial College in 1972, and the Faculty of Economics of Perm State University in 1979.

He worked as a financial inspector for state revenues of the executive committee of the Kudymkarsky district council, then as the head of the district financial department. In 1979, he was the senior controller-auditor of the Control and Auditing Department, and the head of the financial department of the Komi-Permyak Autonomous Okrug.

=== Political activity ===
He was a member of the Communist Party of the Soviet Union until August 1991.

In 1983, he was the Chairman of the Executive Committee of the Yusvinsky District Council. In 1986, Deputy Chairman of the Komi-Permyak Regional Committee for the agro-industrial complex. In 1988, he was the Chairman of the Executive Committee of the Kudymkar District Council.

In December 1991, Poluyanov was appointed head of the Komi-Permyak Autonomous Okrug. On 17 November 1996, he won the election for the head of the district, receiving 69.63% of the vote. The same year, he was a member of the Federation Council, was a member of the Committee on Budget, Tax Policy, Financial, Currency and Customs Regulation, Banking.

In 2000, Poluyanov ran for the next election for the head of the district, in the second round of elections on 17 December, he had 40% of the votes of the voters who participated in the voting, losing to Gennady Savelyev who had 44% of the votes.
