= Sylva, Perm Krai =

Sylva Сылва
- Settlement
- Sylva
- Location within Perm Krai Location within Russia
- Coordinates: 58°01′N 56°44′E
- Country: Russia
- Region: Perm Krai
- District: Permsky District
- Time zone: UTC+5:00

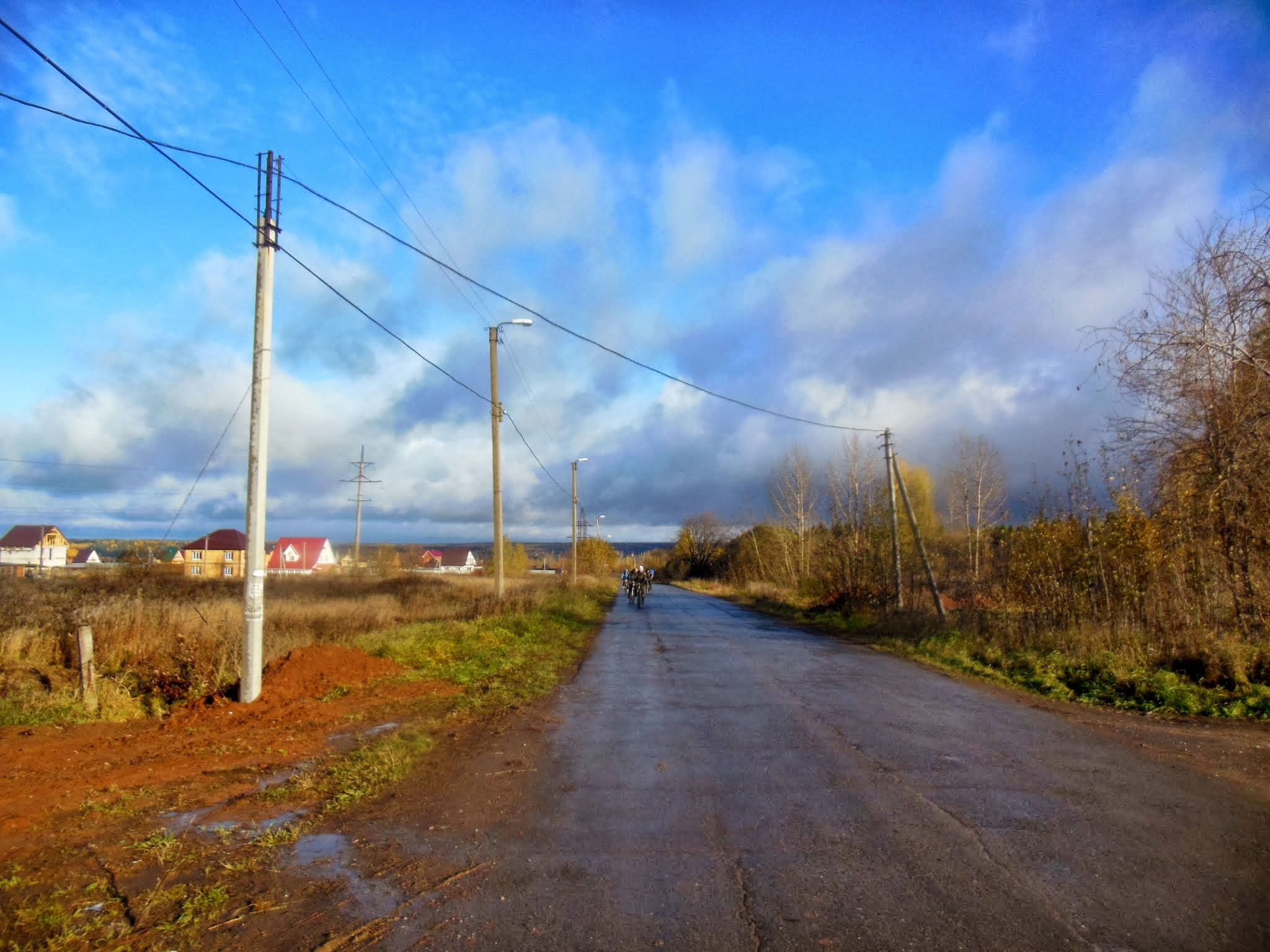

Sylva (Russian: Сылва) is a rural locality (a settlement) and the administrative center of Sylvenskoye Rural Settlement, Permsky District, Perm Krai, Russia. The population was 8,324 as of 2010. There are 140 streets.

== Geography ==
Sylva is located 36 km east of Perm (the district's administrative centre) by road. Troitsa is the nearest rural locality.
