= Lobanovo, Perm Krai =

Lobanovo Лобаново
- Selo
- Location within Perm Krai Location within Russia
- Coordinates: 57°51′N 56°17′E
- Country: Russia
- Region: Perm Krai
- District: Permsky District
- Time zone: UTC+5:00

Lobanovo (Russian: Лобаново) is a rural locality (a selo) and the administrative center of Lobanovskoye Rural Settlement, Permsky District, Perm Krai, Russia. The population was 4,280 as of 2010. There are 27 streets.

== Geography ==
Lobanovo is located 18 km south of Perm (the district's administrative centre) by road. Kochkino is the nearest rural locality.
