= Jerzy Osiński (politician) =

Polish politician

Jerzy Zdzisław Osiński (born 7 July 1936) is a Polish politician, doctor of agricultural sciences (1974), deputy minister of agriculture (1980–1981), member of Sejm (Polish parliament) of 10th convocation (1989–1991).

== Awards ==
- 1985: Officer's Cross of the Order of Polonia Restituta
- 1979: Gold Cross of Merit
