= Evgeniy Sapiro =

Soviet-Russian economist and politician (1934–2024)

- Евгений Сапиро
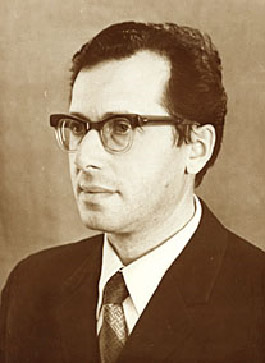
- Sapiro in 1999

Chairman of the Legislative Assembly of Perm Krai
- In office 4 April 1994 – 14 December 1997
- Preceded by: Office established
- Succeeded by: Yuri Medvedev

Minister of Regional and National Policy
- In office 8 May 1998 – 22 September 1998
- President: Boris Yeltsin
- Prime Minister: Sergey Kiriyenko; Viktor Chernomyrdin; Yevgeny Primakov
- Preceded by: Ministry established; Vyacheslav Mikhailov as Minister for Nationalities and Federative Relations
- Succeeded by: Ministry abolished; Ramazan Abdulatipov as Minister of National Policy; Valery Kirpichnikov as Minister of Regional Policy

Personal details
- Born: 29 January 1934 Mariupol, Ukrainian SSR, USSR
- Died: 21 September 2024 (aged 90) Perm, Russia
- Party: CPSU

Evgeniy Saulovich Sapiro (Russian: Евгений Саулович Сапиро; 29 January 1934 – 21 September 2024) was a Soviet-Russian economist and politician. He served as minister of regional and national policy of Russia in 1998.

Sapiro died in Perm, Russia on 21 September 2024, at the age of 90.
