= Froly =

Froly Фролы
- Selo
- Location within Perm Krai Location within Russia
- Coordinates: 57°55′N 56°16′E
- Country: Russia
- Region: Perm Krai
- District: Permsky District
- Time zone: UTC+5:00

Froly (Russian: Фролы) is a rural locality (a selo) and the administrative center of Frolovskoye Rural Settlement, Permsky District, Perm Krai, Russia. The population was 1,973 as of 2010. There are 33 streets.

== Geography ==
Froly is located 11 km south of Perm (the district's administrative centre) by road. Nestyukovo is the nearest rural locality.
