= Michael Osinski =

American computer programmer

- Born: 1954 (age 71–72); Mobile, Alabama
- Occupation: Financial software programmer, Oyster Farmer
- Years active: 1980s–1990s

Michael Osinski (born 1954) is a former Wall Street computer programmer who developed a software that played a role in the subprime mortgage-fueled crisis from 2007 to 2009. The software allowed the bundling of mortgage loans into bonds, which precipitated the subprime mortgage crisis that sparked the 2008 financial crisis.

== Early life and career ==
Osinski was born in 1954 and grew up in Mobile, Alabama. Prior to his work on Wall Street, Osinski was first involved in data entry. He became a lead programmer for a telecommunications company in the early 1980s and oversaw a team that wrote a system for tracking daily sales. However, he lost his job once the software became stable.

During the 1990s, Osinski worked for Lehman Brothers as a computer strategist. He helped develop BondTalk, which is a language capable of modeling collateralized mortgage obligations.

== 2008 financial crisis ==
The 2008 financial crisis was caused by the crash in bonds associated with U.S. home loans, which were bundled with other loans and packaged as safe investments. This is referred to as mortgage securitization and was first introduced in 1983. For the first time, however, a software was developed by Osinski—together with his wife Isabel—that streamlined the process through the creation of an intricate network of bonds that are based on homeowners' payments. This new system, a product of 13 years of development, spread on Wall Street and allowed the exploitation of the market and consumers. First, the software became one of the tools used by banks and traders to obtain short-term gain but, later, these were used as "dangerous, volatile, mispriced financial weapons." There was a significant increase in available mortgage credit due to subprime lending but problems (e.g. increased risk of foreclosure) emerged due to relaxed credit standards.

== Retirement and farming ==
At 45, when his software was sold, Osinski retired and set up the Widow's Hole Oyster Farm. He and his wife bought a Long Island waterfront property in 1999, which they used to cultivate oysters. The Osinskis also actively campaign against the importation of oysters from Europe, citing its risk to the American shellfish industry.
