= Ust-Kachka =

Ust-Kachka Усть-Качка
- Selo
- Location within Perm Krai Location within Russia
- Coordinates: 58°00′N 55°40′E
- Country: Russia
- Region: Perm Krai
- District: Permsky District
- Time zone: UTC+5:00

Ust-Kachka (Russian: Усть-Качка) is a rural locality (a selo) and the administrative center of Ust-Kachkinskoye Rural Settlement, Permsky District, Perm Krai, Russia. The population was4,098 as of 2010. There are 59 streets.

== Geography ==
Ust-Kachka is located 50 km west of Perm (the district's administrative centre) by road. Krasny Voskhod is the nearest rural locality.
