= Chastye, Chastinsky District, Perm Krai =

Chastye Частые
- Selo
- Interactive map of Chastye
- Location of Chastye Chastye (Perm Krai)
- Coordinates: 57°17′29″N 54°58′34″E
- Country: Russia
- Federal subject: Perm Krai
- Administrative district: Chastinsky District

Population (2010 Census)
  - Total: 4,859
  - Estimate (2021): 4,859 (0%)

Administrative status
  - Capital of: Chastinsky District
- Time zone: UTC+5 (MSK+2)
- OKTMO ID: 57655425101

Chastye (Russian: Частые) is a rural locality (a selo) and the administrative center of Chastinsky District of Perm Krai, Russia, located on the banks of the Votkinsk Reservoir. Population: 4,859 (2010 census); 5,032 (2002 census); 4,556 (1989 Soviet census).
