= Skobelevka, Perm Krai =

Skobelevka Скобелевка
- Village
- Location within Perm Krai Location within Russia
- Coordinates: 58°13′N 56°17′E
- Country: Russia
- Region: Perm Krai
- District: Permsky District
- Time zone: UTC+5:00

Skobelevka (Russian: Скобелевка) is a rural locality (a village) and the administrative center of Khokhlovskoye Rural Settlement, Permsky District, Perm Krai, Russia. The population was 1,005 as of 2010. There are 19 streets.

== Geography ==
Skobelevka is located 41 km north of Perm (the district's administrative centre) by road. Zagrishinskoye is the nearest rural locality.
