= Kultayevo =

Kultayevo Култаево
- Selo
- Location within Perm Krai Location within Russia
- Coordinates: 57°53′N 55°56′E
- Country: Russia
- Region: Perm Krai
- District: Permsky District
- Time zone: UTC+5:00

Kultayevo (Russian: Култаево) is a rural locality (a selo) and the administrative center of Kultayevskoye Rural Settlement, Permsky District, Perm Krai, Russia. The population was 5,067 as of 2010. There are 198 streets.

== Geography ==
Kultayevo is located 26 km southwest of Perm (the district's administrative centre) by road. Anikino is the nearest rural locality.
