= Kukushtan =

Kukushtan Кукуштан
- Settlement
- Location within Perm Krai Location within Russia
- Coordinates: 57°38′N 56°30′E
- Country: Russia
- Region: Perm Krai
- District: Permsky District
- Time zone: UTC+5:00

Kukushtan (Russian: Кукуштан) is a rural locality (a settlement) and the administrative center of Kukushtanskoye Rural Settlement, Permsky District, Perm Krai, Russia. The population was 5,650 as of 2010. There are 118 streets.

== Geography ==
Kukushtan is located 50 km south of Perm (the district's administrative centre) by road. Klyuchiki is the nearest rural locality.
