= Gamovo =

Gamovo Гамово
- Selo
- Location within Perm Krai Location within Russia
- Coordinates: 57°52′N 56°05′E
- Country: Russia
- Region: Perm Krai
- District: Permsky District
- Time zone: UTC+5:00

Gamovo (Russian: Гамово) is a rural locality (a selo) and the administrative center of Gamovskoye Rural Settlement, Permsky District, Perm Krai, Russia. The population was 5,464 as of 2010. There are 31 streets.

== Geography ==
Gamovo is located 21 km southwest of Perm (the district's administrative centre) by road. Sakmary is the nearest rural locality.
