= Irina Ivenskikh =

Russian politician

- Ирина Ивенских
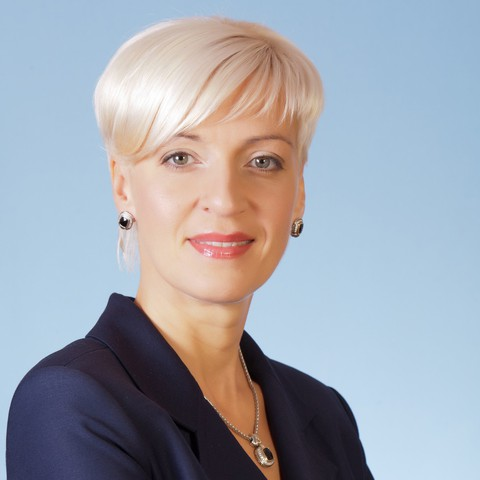

Member of the State Duma for Perm Krai
- Incumbent
- Assumed office 12 October 2021
- Preceded by: Dmitry Sazonov
- Constituency: Kudymkar (No. 61)

Personal details
- Born: 22 July 1972 (age 54) Mirny, Arkhangelsk Oblast, Russian SFSR, USSR
- Party: United Russia
- Education: Perm State Humanitarian Pedagogical University; Higher School of Economics
- Occupation: School Psychologist

Irina Valentinovna Ivenskikh (Russian: Ирина Валентиновна Ивенских; born 22 July 1972, Mirny, Arkhangelsk Oblast) is a Russian political figure and a deputy of the 8th State Duma. In 2019, she was awarded a Doctor of Sciences in Psychology degree.

From 2004 to 2015, she was the director of Lyceum No.10 in Perm. In 2009–2011, she served as Deputy Chairman of the Public Chamber of the Perm Oblast. From 2011 to 2015, she was a co-chairman of the Perm branch of the All-Russia People's Front. On 4 December 2011 she was elected deputy of the Legislative Assembly of Perm Krai. In 2015–2018, she was appointed Deputy Chairman of the Government of the Perm Krai. In January 2019, she became a co-chair of the regional branch of the All-Russia People's Front in Perm. She left the post in September 2021 when she was elected deputy of the 8th State Duma. On 13 October 2021 she was elected Chairman of the State Duma Committee on Education.
