= Kondratovo, Perm Krai =

Kondratovo Кондратово
- Village
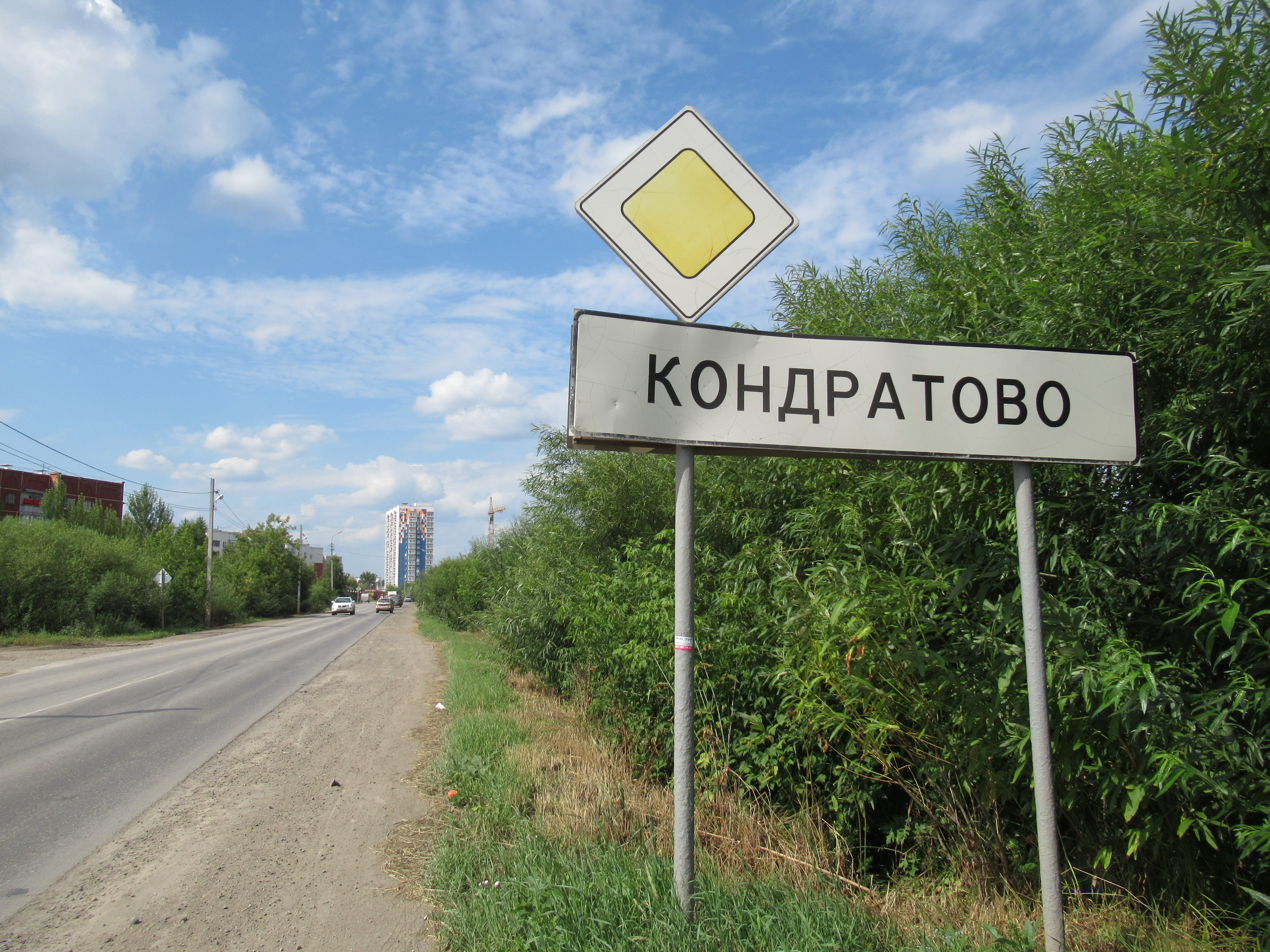

- Location within Perm Krai Location within Russia
- Coordinates: 57°58′N 56°06′E
- Country: Russia
- Region: Perm Krai
- District: Permsky District
- Time zone: UTC+5:00

Kondratovo (Russian: Кондратово) is a rural locality (a village) and the administrative center of Kondratovskoye Rural Settlement, Permsky District, Perm Krai, Russia. The population was 10,023 as of 2010. There are 90 streets.

== Geography ==
Kondratovo is located 12 km southwest of Perm (the district's administrative centre) by road. Ust-Mully is the nearest rural locality.
