= Osinsky =

Osinsky or Osinski (masculine), Osinskaya (feminine), or Osinskoye (neuter) may refer to:

== Places ==
- Osinskoye Urban Settlement or Osinskaya Sloboda, former names of Osa, Perm Krai, a town in Russia
- Osinsky District, Irkutsk Oblast
- Osinsky District, Perm Krai
- Osinsky Uyezd, former subdivision of the Russian Empire

== People ==
- Moshe Osinsky, birth name of Montague Burton, British businessperson
- Nikolay Osinsky, pseudonym of Valerian Obolensky (1887–1938), Russian Bolshevik revolutionary, Marxist theorist, Soviet politician, economist, and professor
- Stanislav Ossinskiy (born 1984), Olympic swimmer from Kazakhstan
- Valerian Andreyevich Osinsky (1852–1879), Russian revolutionary
