= Chastinsky District =

Chastinsky District Частинский район (Russian)
- District
- Flag Coat of arms
- Location of Chastinsky District in Perm Krai
- Coordinates: 57.294°N 54.768°E
- Country: Russia
- Federal subject: Perm Krai
- Established: January 13, 1924 (first), 1935 (second)
- Administrative center: Chastye

Area
  - Total: 1,632 km^{2} (630 sq mi)

Population (2010 Census)
  - Total: 12,817
  - Density: 7.854/km^{2} (20.34/sq mi)
  - Urban: 0%
  - Rural: 100%

Administrative structure
  - Inhabited localities: 54 rural localities

Municipal structure
  - Municipally incorporated as: Chastinsky Municipal District
  - Municipal divisions: 0 urban settlements, 4 rural settlements
- Time zone: UTC+5 (MSK+2)
- OKTMO ID: 57555000
- Website: https://chastinskiy.ru/

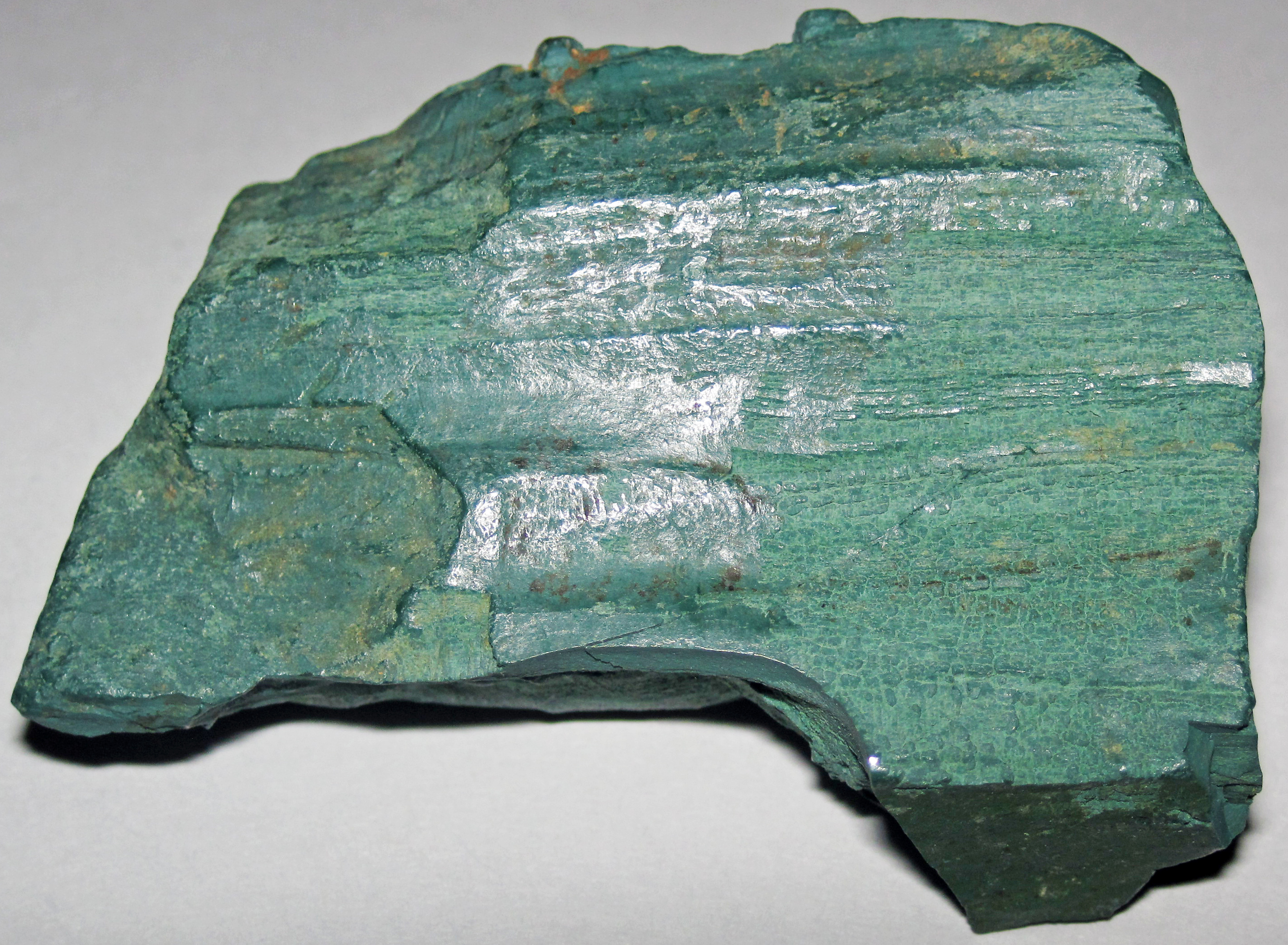
Volkonskoite-replaced fossil wood, Mt. Efimiatsk, Chastinsky District

Chastinsky District (Russian: Частинский райо́н) is an administrative district (raion) of Perm Krai, Russia; one of the thirty-three in the krai. Municipally, it is incorporated as Chastinsky Municipal District. It is located in the southwest of the krai. The area of the district is 1,632 square kilometers (630 sq mi). Its administrative center is the rural locality (a selo) of Chastye. Population: 12,817 (2010 census); 14,675 (2002 census); 14,791 (1989 Soviet census). The population of Chastye accounts for 37.9% of the district's total population.

== Geography and climate ==
About 34% of the district's area is forested; the forests are mostly coniferous. Natural resources include oil and peat. Climate is temperate continental.

== History ==
The district was established on January 13, 1924, although its borders kept changing until December 30, 1968. In 1931–1935, the district was merged into Osinsky District.

== Demographics ==
As of the 2002 Census, Russians, at 96.4%, are the dominant ethnicity in the district.

== Economy ==
The economy of the district is mainly agricultural.

== Sources ==
- Законодательное собрание Пермской области. Закон №416-67 от 28 февраля 1996 г. «Об административно-территориальном устройстве Пермского края», в ред. Закона №504-ПК от 9 июля 2015 г. «О внесении изменений в Закон Пермской области "Об административно-территориальном устройстве Пермского края"». Вступил в силу с момента опубликования. Опубликован: "Звезда", №38, 12 марта 1996 г. (Legislative Assembly of Perm Oblast. Law #416-67 of February 28, 1996 On the Administrative-Territorial Structure of Perm Krai, as amended by the Law #504-PK of July 9, 2015 On Amending the Law of Perm Oblast "On the Administrative-Territorial Structure of Perm Krai". Effective as of the moment of publication.).
- Законодательное собрание Пермской области. Закон №1726-351 от 10 ноября 2004 г. «Об утверждении границ и о наделении статусом муниципальных образований Частинского района Пермского края», в ред. Закона №175-ПК от 7 марта 2013 г. «О внесении изменений в отдельные Законы Пермской области, Коми-Пермяцкого автономного округа об утверждении границ и о наделении статусом муниципальных образований Пермского края». Вступил в силу через десять дней со дня официального опубликования. Опубликован: "Бюллетень Законодательного Собрания и администрации Пермской области", №12, I часть, 9 декабря 2004 г. (Legislative Assembly of Perm Oblast. Law #1726-351 of November 10, 2004 On Establishing the Borders and on Granting the Status to the Municipal Formations of Chastinsky District of Perm Krai, as amended by the Law #175-PK of March 7, 2013 On Amending Various Laws of Perm Oblast, Komi-Permyak Autonomous Okrug on Establishing the Borders and on Granting the Status to the Municipal Formations of Perm Krai. Effective as of the day which is ten days following the day of the official publication.).
