= Sverdlovsky City District, Perm =

Coordinates: 57.9833°N 56.2500°E

Sverdlovsky District in Perm

Sverdlovsky City District (Russian: Свердло́вский райо́н) is one of the seven city districts of the city of Perm in Perm Krai, Russia, located in the Kama River's left bank. Population: 210,477 (2010 Census); 215,487 (2002 Census); 236,681 (1989 Soviet census). It is the most populous district of Perm.

== Etymology ==
It is named for Yakov Sverdlov, who led the party organizations in the Urals during the revolution of 1905-1907.

== History ==
The district was established on May 27, 1936 as Stalinsky (Ста́линский).
