= Komi-Permyak Autonomous Okrug =

1925–2005 unit of Russia

Coordinates: 59.0167°N 54.6667°E

Komi-Permyak Autonomous Okrug Коми-Пермяцкий автономный округ Коми-Пермяцкöй автономнöй округ
- Former autonomous okrug
- 1925–2005
- Flag Coat of arms

- Komi-Permyak Autonomous Okrug (salmon) within Perm Oblast
- Capital: Kudymkar
- Area
  - 2002: 32,770 km^{2} (12,650 sq mi)
- Population
  - 2002: 136,076
- Licence plate: 81
- Government
  - Type: Federal subject
- Governor
  - 1991–2000: Nikolay Poluyanov
  - 2000–05: Gennady Savelyev
- Legislature: Legislative Assembly
- History
  - Established: 26 February 1925
  - Disestablished: 1 December 2005
- Contained within
  - Self-governing part of: Ural Oblast (1925–34); Sverdlovsk Oblast (1934–38); Perm Oblast (1938–2005)
Preceded by	Succeeded by
Ural Oblast (1923–1934)	Komi-Permyak Okrug
- Today part of: Komi-Permyak Okrug, Perm Krai

Komi-Permyak Autonomous Okrug (Note: Russian: Коми-Пермяцкий автономный округ, abbr. КПАО; Komi-Permyak: Коми-Пермяцкöй автономнöй округ. Known informally as Komi-Permyakia (Коми-Пермякия) and locally as Komi Okrug (Коми-округ).) was an autonomous okrug of the Russian SFSR and the Russian Federation, administered by Perm Oblast. It was established on February 26, 1925 as an administrative division for Komi-Permyaks, a branch of the Komis. The territory is now administrated as Komi-Permyak Okrug of Perm Krai.

== History ==
Komi-Permyak Autonomous Okrug was established on 26 February 1925, under the name of the Komi-Permyak National Okrug as a part of the former Ural Oblast. On 17 January 1934, the oblast was abolished and split into a number of regions, one of which was Sverdlovsk Oblast, which Komi-Permyak NO was subordinated to. On 3 October 1938, Perm Oblast was created and Komi-Permyak NO became subordinated to it. The region name was changed to end with "Autonomous Okrug" rather than "National Okrug" in 1977.

In 1992, the region became its own federal entity within the Russian Federation while simultaneously being administratively subordinated to Perm Oblast. In 2003, a merger referendum was held. The majority of residents who participated in the referendum in both Perm Oblast and Komi-Permyak Autonomous Okrug voted to merge the two regions into a single federal entity.

On 1 December 2005, Komi-Permyak Autonomous Okrug was merged into Perm Oblast to form the new region of Perm Krai. It became the first autonomous okrug in Russia to lose that status of the six which merged between 2005 and 2008.

== Governors ==
In 1992, Komi-Permyak Autonomous Okrug was proclaimed a federal subject of Russia, at the same time continuing to be part of Perm Oblast. For 14 years of Komi-Permyakia's semi-independent existence two persons were holding the office of Head of Administration.

No.	Image	Governor	Tenure	Time in office	Election
1		Nikolay Poluyanov (born 1952)	14 December 1991 – 26 December 2000 (lost re-election)	9 years, 12 days	Appointed 1996
2		Gennady Savelyev (born 1945)	26 December 2000 – 1 December 2005 (term end)	4 years, 340 days	2000

After 2005 unification, the former autonomy was continued by Komi-Permyak Okrug, a special territory within Perm Krai. Its head is ranked as Minister for Komi-Permyak Okrug Affairs and is appointed by the governor.
