= Park Avenue (disambiguation) =

Park Avenue is a street in New York City.

Park Avenue may also refer to:

== Roads ==
- Park Avenue (Montreal), in Quebec, Canada
- Park Avenue (Kochi), in India
- Park Avenue, Dublin, in Ireland
- Park Avenue (Baltimore), in Maryland, U.S.
- Park Avenue (Minneapolis), in Minnesota, U.S.
- Park Avenue (Monongahela), in Pennsylvania, U.S.
- Park Avenue, a section of Pennsylvania Route 743 in Hershey, Pennsylvania, U.S.

== Other uses ==
- Buick Park Avenue, a car named after the Park Avenue in New York
- Park Ave. (band), an indie pop band from Omaha
- Park Avenue, Aberystwyth, a football ground in Aberystwyth, Wales
- Park Avenue Christian Church
- Park Avenue Condominiums, a skyscraper in Atlanta, Georgia, United States
- Park Avenue (Hong Kong), a private housing estate in Hong Kong
- Park Avenue (musical), a 1946 musical
- Park Avenue, Queensland, a suburb of Rockhampton, Australia
- "Park Avenue" (song), a 1998 single by Girls Against Boys
- Park Avenue (stadium), a cricket and football ground in Bradford, England, which lent its name to Bradford Park Avenue A.F.C.
- Park Avenue Synagogue, in Manhattan
- Park Avenue (teletext soap), a teletext-based soap opera on the ORACLE service from 1988 to 1992
- Park Avenue West Tower, a skyscraper in Portland, Oregon
- Seventh Regiment Armory or Park Avenue Armory, a building in New York City
- Park Avenue: Money, Power and the American Dream, a 2012 political documentary

== See also ==
- Bradford (Park Avenue)
- Park Avenue Historic District (disambiguation)
- Park Avenue Line (disambiguation)
- Park Avenue Tunnel (disambiguation)
- Park Lane (disambiguation)
- Park Row (disambiguation)
- Park Street (disambiguation)
- Parkovy Avenue, in Perm, Russia
- Park Avenue Viaduct, Manhattan
