= Urban forests of Perm =

Managed forest areas in Perm, Russia

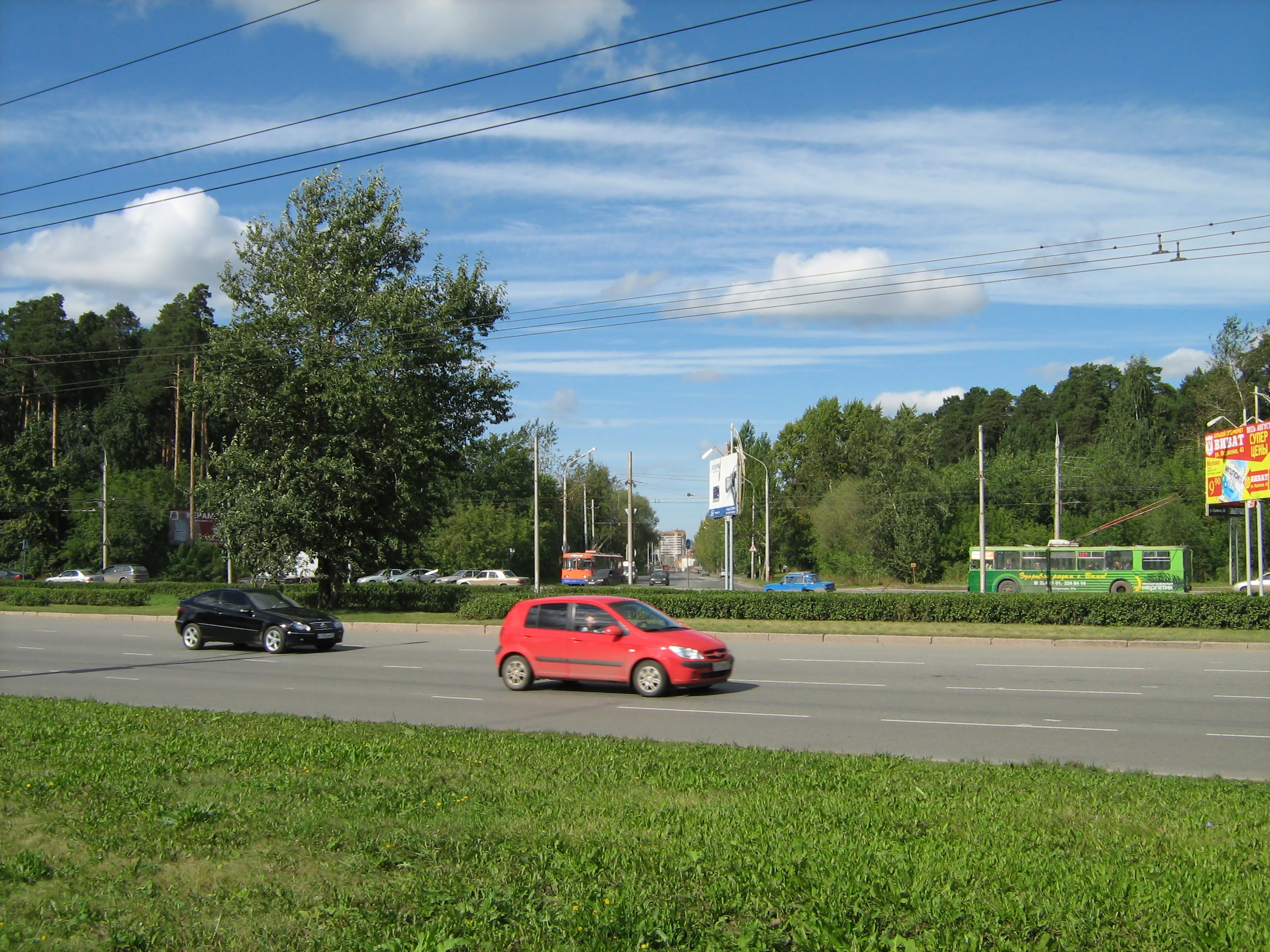
Chernyayevsky Forest

The total area of urban forests of Perm in 2006 was 33,890 ha (338.90 km^{2}). They are controlled by the Perm urban forestry commission (Russian: Муниципальное учреждение «Пермский городской лесхоз»). On September 5, 2005 by Order #400-P of the governor of Perm Oblast, control over the local urban forests was transferred from federal forestries to the city.

In 2005 the Perm municipal urban forestry commission reported taking the following measures:

- Gathering of wind-fallen trees and deadfalls in Chernyayevsky Forest over an area of 11 ha.
- Gathering of rubbish over an area of 54 ha.
- Maintenance of forest over an area of 6 ha.
- Some 3.5 ha of pine-trees were planted in Chernyayevsky Forest
- Measures were taken in biological forest pestscontrol; artificial nests were placed:
  - in Chernyayevsky Forest (80 nests);
  - in SPNT (Special Protected Natural Territory) "Sosnovy Bor" (70 nests);
  - in the forests of Ordzhonikidzevsky City District (60 nests);
  - in the forests of Kirovsky and Dzerzhinsky city districts (74 nests).
- 18 violations were noted, files were transferred to the MVD and Rosprirodnadzor (Russian nature inspection).
- 18 barriers were installed to prevent cars from entering Chernyayevsky Forest.
- 16 forest fires were extinguished.

== See also ==
- Trees and shrubs of Perm
