= Trees and shrubs of Perm =

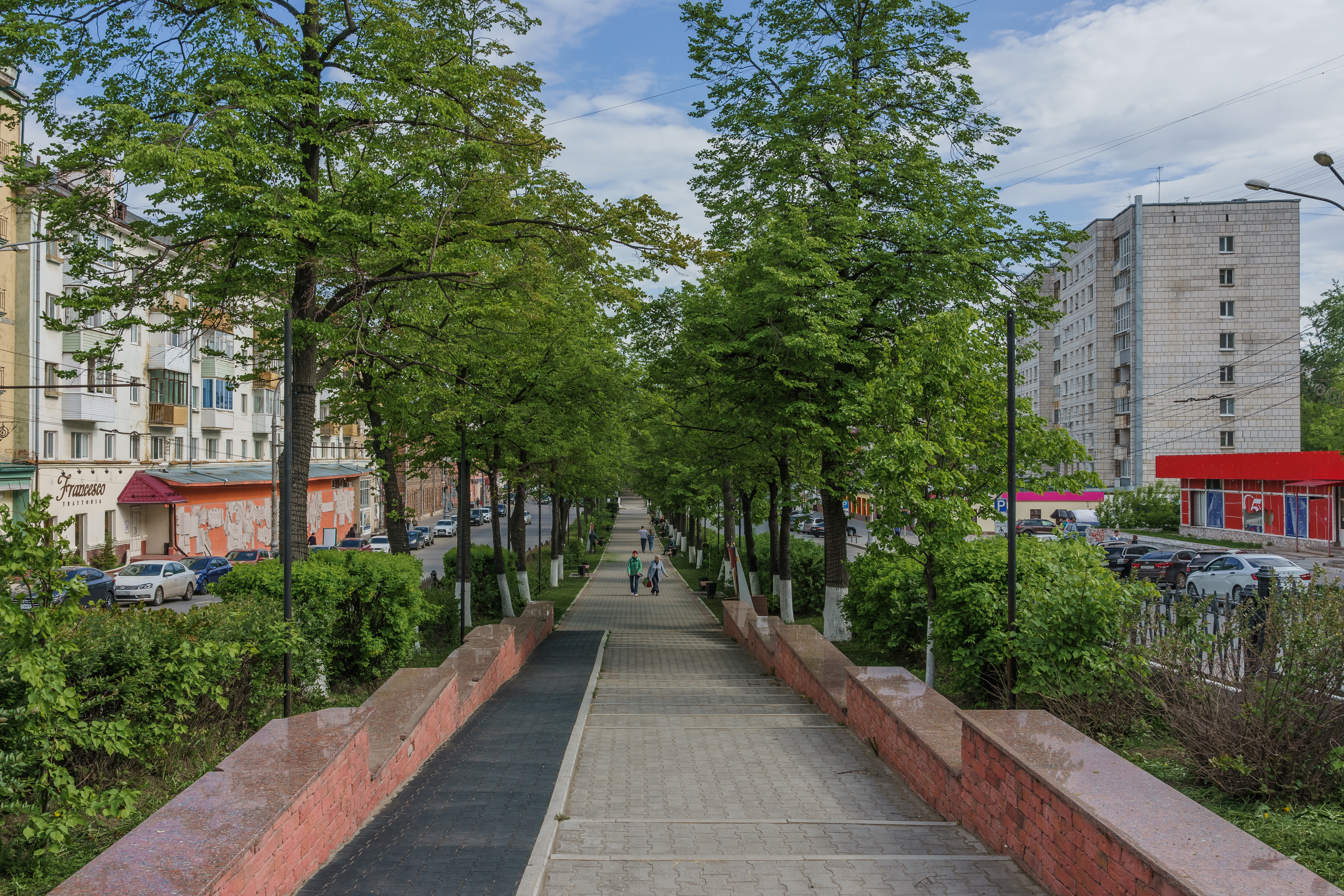
Komsomolsky Avenue

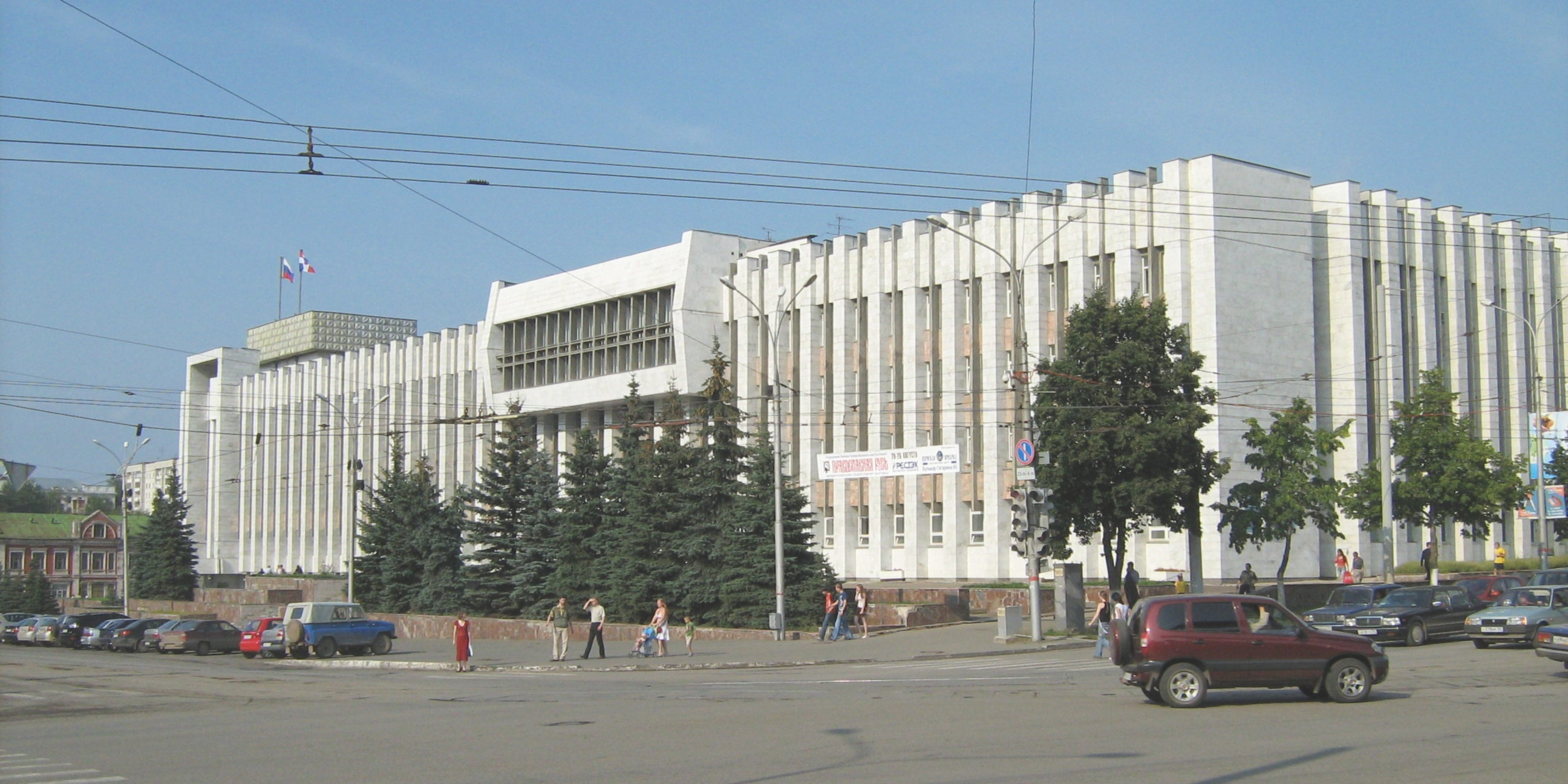
Spruces in front of Cultural and Business Center

The area of trees and shrubs in the city of Perm in 2000 was:

Category of trees and shrubs	Area (km²)
of common use (gardens, parks, boulevards)	7.51
of limited use (inside the dwelling blocs, at the territories of schools, hospitals, another institutions)	10.39
of special use (protective sanitary plantations, cemeteries and so on.)	10.20

In 2000, by the order of city administration Perm State University drew up an inventory of trees and shrubs, which embraced Industrialny and Leninsky city districts completely and other city districts partially. 697,055 trees was taken into account.

District	Explored area (km²)	Wood area (km²)	Total length of paths (km)
Dzerzhinsky	20.50	1.16	64.4
Kirovsky	20.32	2.109	86.8
Motovilikhinsky	34.32	1.725	88.4
Ordzhonikidzevsky	33.94	2.453	62.7
Sverdlovsky	28.88	2.145	159.0

District	Total amount of trees	Prevailing types, %	Amount of old trees	Amount of trees, that require replacement
Dzerzhinsky	72,302	Poplar — 20.03; Norway Maple — 16.38; Acer negundo — 12.9	4,856 (6.71%)	948 (19.52%)
Kirovsky	188,497	Pine — 29.37; Poplar — 26.12; Acer negundo — 13.2	98,374 (52.18%)	2,322 (2.36%)
Motovilikhinsky	129,888	Acer negundo — 27.62; Poplar — 15.88; Willow — 14.05	13,603 (10.47%)	1,419 (10.43%)
Ordzhonikidzevsky	101,566	Poplar — 24.09; Birch — 17.32; Acer negundo — 13.02	1,928 (1.89%)	1,297 (67.27%)
Sverdlovsky	163,945	Acer negundo — 24.82; Willow — 15.94; Poplar — 13.18	6,133 (3.74%)	642 (10.47%)
Leninsky	13,151	Acer negundo — 30.22; Tilia — 18.6; Poplar — 15.23	3,283 (14.53%)	897 (27.32%)
Industrialny	27,706	Poplar — 36,99; Acer negundo — 23,63; Birch — 14.63	1,911 (11.85%)	1,748 (91.47%)

The city administration makes efforts to plant trees and shrubs. Since 1999, a "Green Wall" campaign is conducted with the purpose of increase in quantity of trees and shrubs. The action is realized by force of OTOSes, schoolchildren and volunteers.

== See also ==
- Urban forests of Perm
