= Parkovy =

Parkovy (masculine), Parkovaya (feminine), or Parkovoye (neuter) may refer to:

- Parkovy (rural locality) (Parkovaya, Parkovoye), name of several rural localities in Russia
- Parkovy Microdistrict, a microdistrict of Perm, Russia
