= Mulyanka =

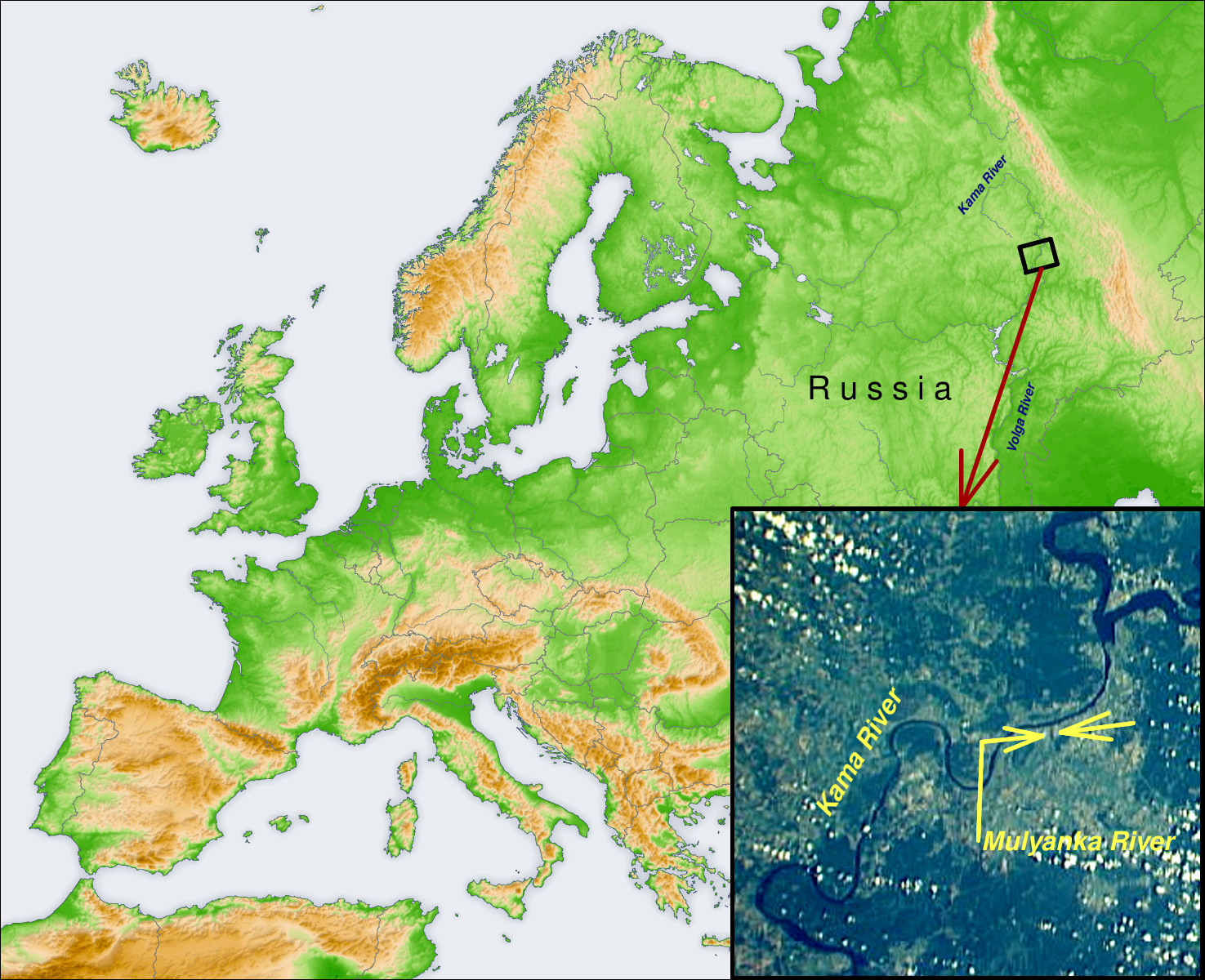
- Mulyanka River location in Europe

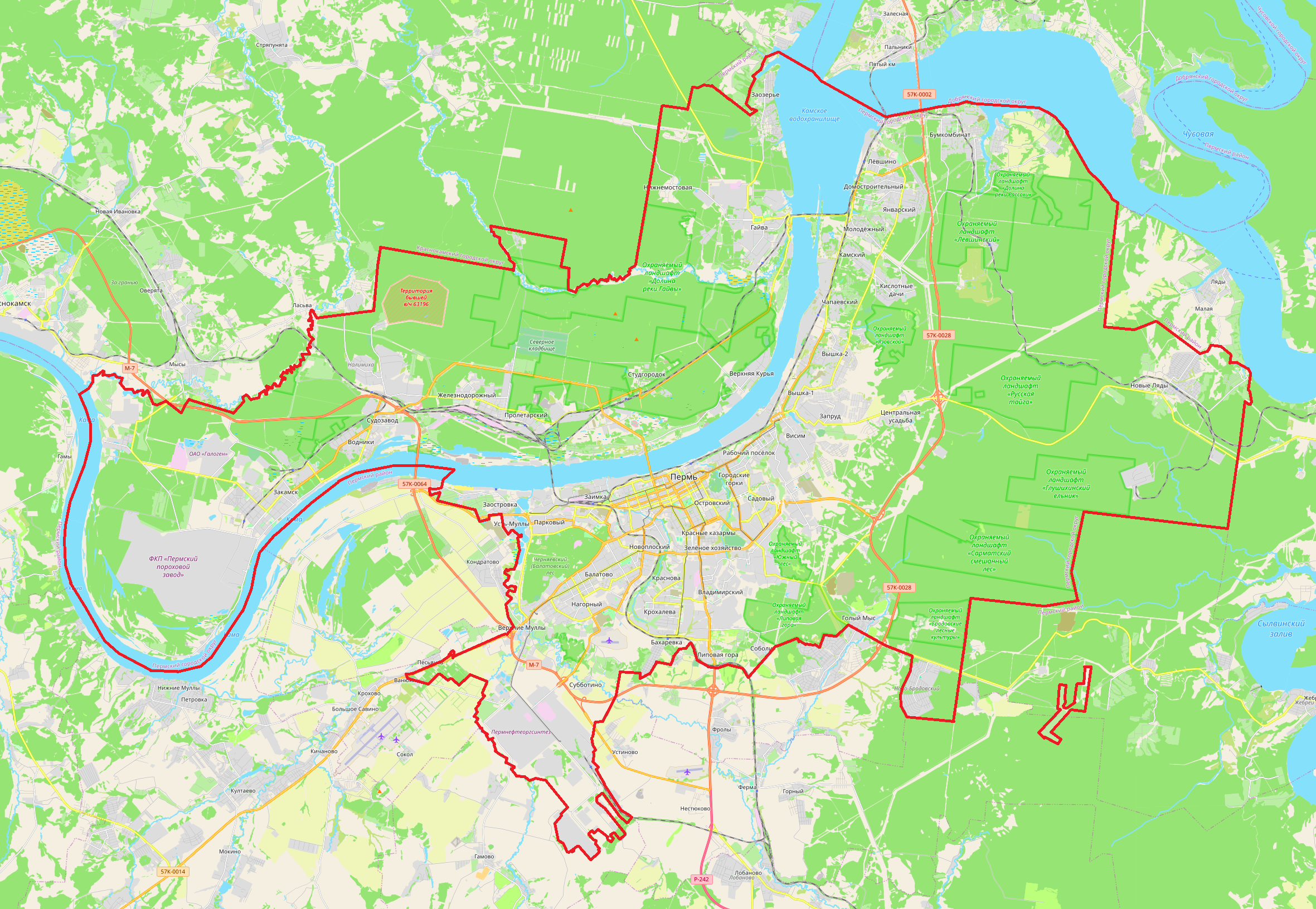
- Location of mouth of Mulyanka River in Perm

Location
- Country: Russia

Physical characteristics
- Source
  - location: Permsky District of Perm Krai
  - coordinates: 57.7668°N 56.4002°E
- Mouth
  - location: Kama
  - coordinates: 58.0097°N 56.1373°E
- Length: 52 km (32 mi)
- Basin size: 460.7 km^{2} (177.9 mi^{2})

Basin features
- Progression: Kama→ Volga→ Caspian Sea

The Mulyanka (Russian: Муля́нка, pronounced [mʊˈlʲanka]), also referred as Upper Mulyanka, is a small river in Perm Krai, Russia which flows in the city of Perm and nearby Permsky District and is a left tributary of the Kama. The proximity of city's industry has a heavy influence on the river ecology.

== Geography ==
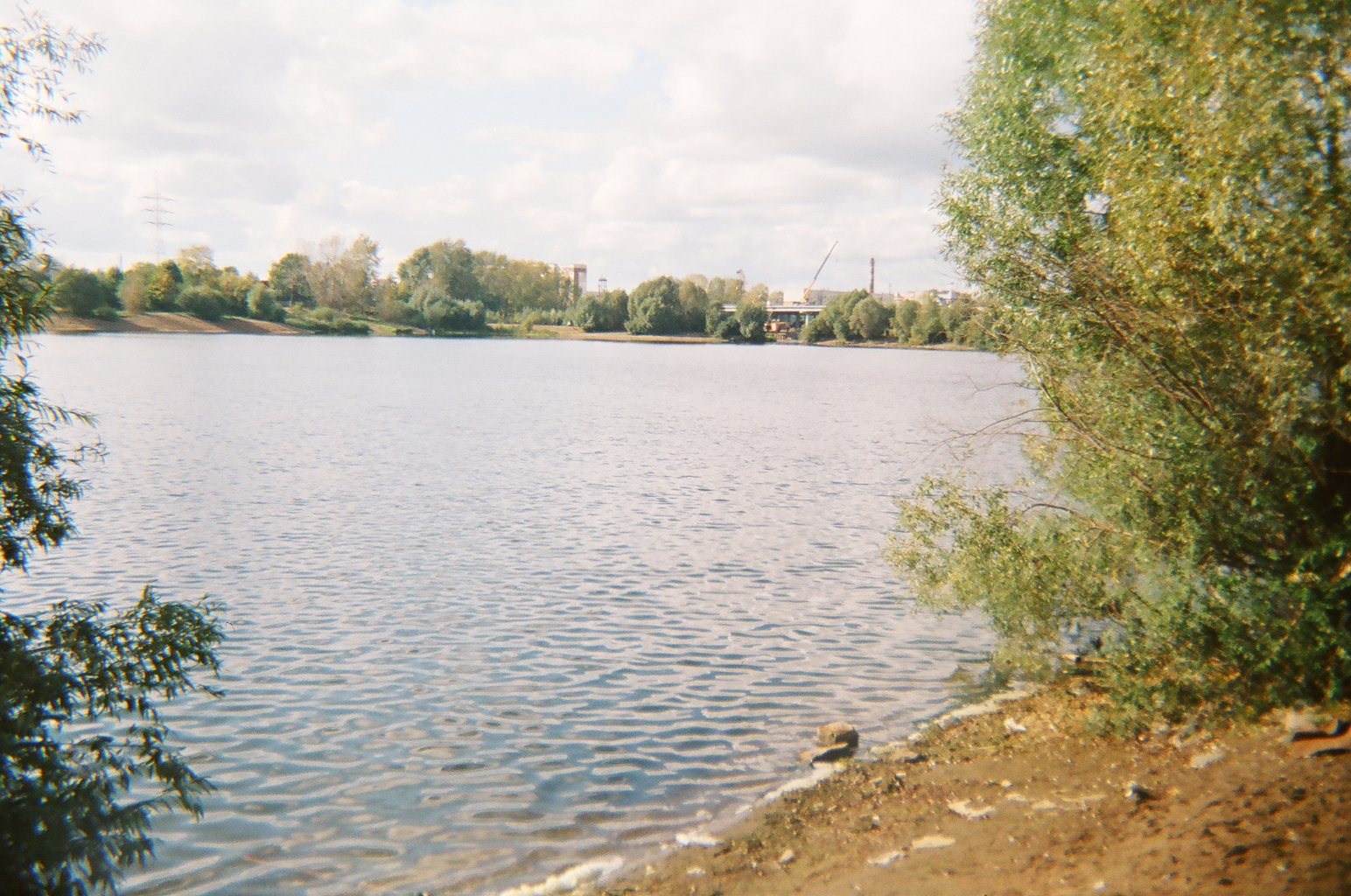
View of Mulyanka River from the beginning of Parkovy Avenue

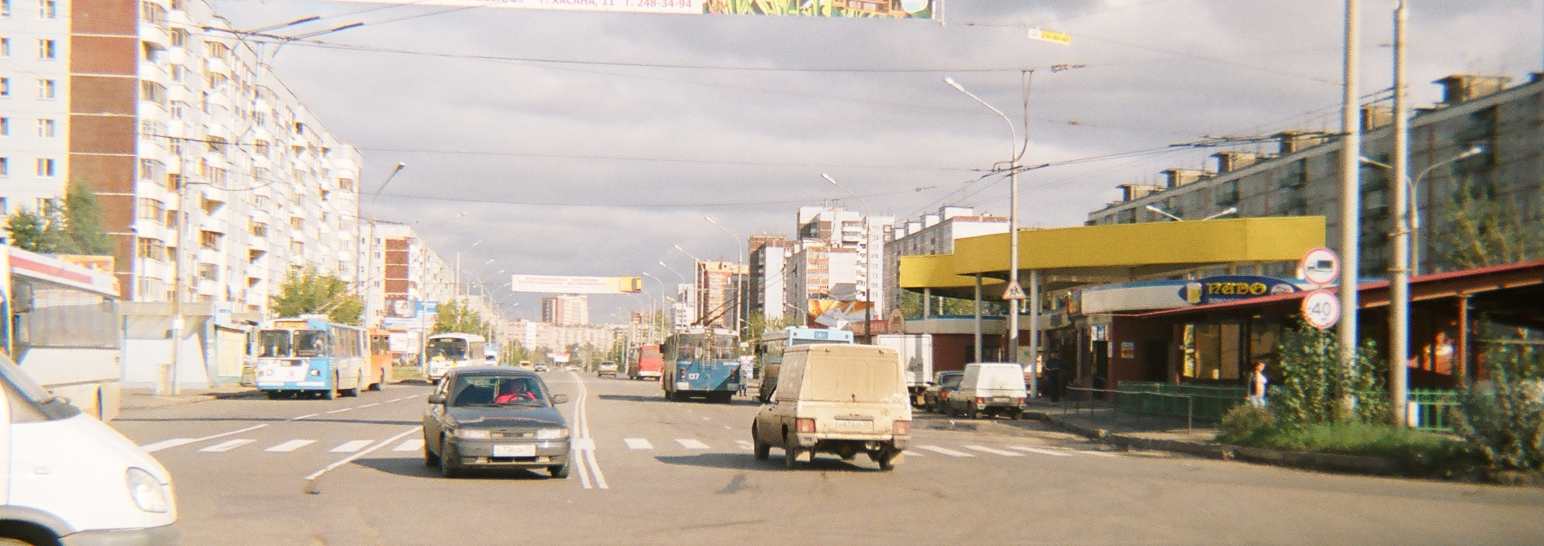
View of Parkovy Avenue from the bank of Mulyanka River

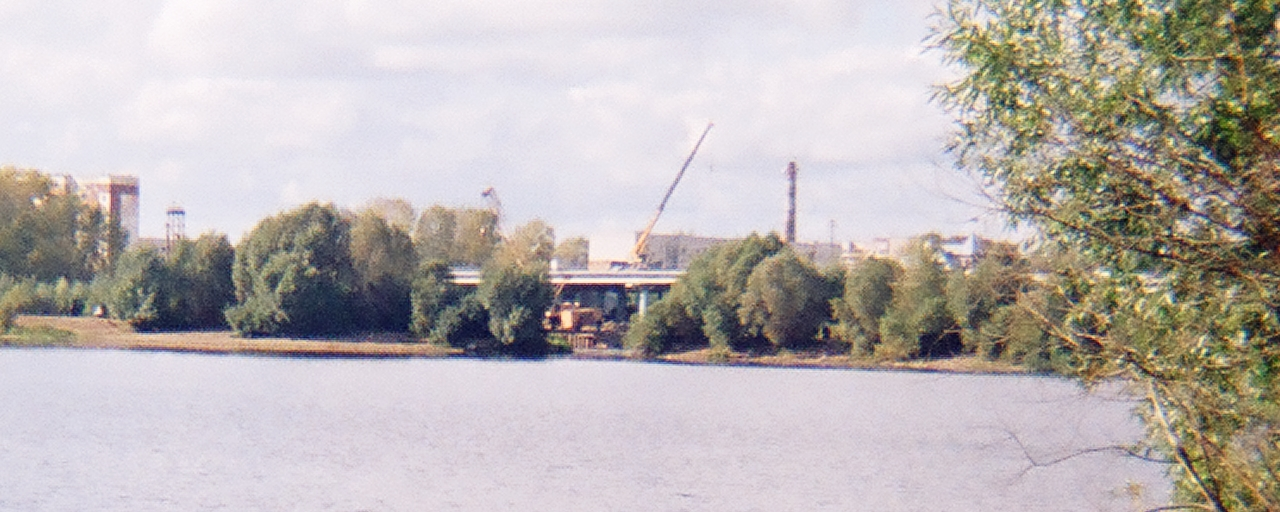
Building of bridge (close-up)

The Mulyanka is 52 kilometres (32 mi) long, and the area of its drainage basin is 460.7 square kilometres (177.9 mi^{2}). Mulyanka has 35 tributaries; the largest of them is its left tributary, Pyzh. One of its right tributaries is the Malinovka.

The origin of Mulyanka is in the Permsky District of Perm Krai. It mainly flows along the west outskirts of the left-bank (relatively to Kama) part of Perm's (Industrialny and Dzerzhinsky city districts).

The village of Verkhniye Mully (Ве́рхние Муллы́), one of the oldest historical settlements in the borders of modern Perm, is situated at the banks of the Mulyanka. Since 1958 it belongs to Industrialny City District of Perm.

There are following bridges over Mulyanka in Industrialny City District:

- Bridge at Leonov Street.
- Bridge at Promyshlennaya Street.
- Bridge at Cosmonauts Highway.

Then Mulyanka flows along the edge of Chernyayevsky Forest and crosses the borders of Industrialny and Dzerzhinsky City Districts. In Dzerzhinsky District it flows between Parkovy and Zaostrovka microdistricts and is crossed by following bridges:

- The pedestrian bridge.
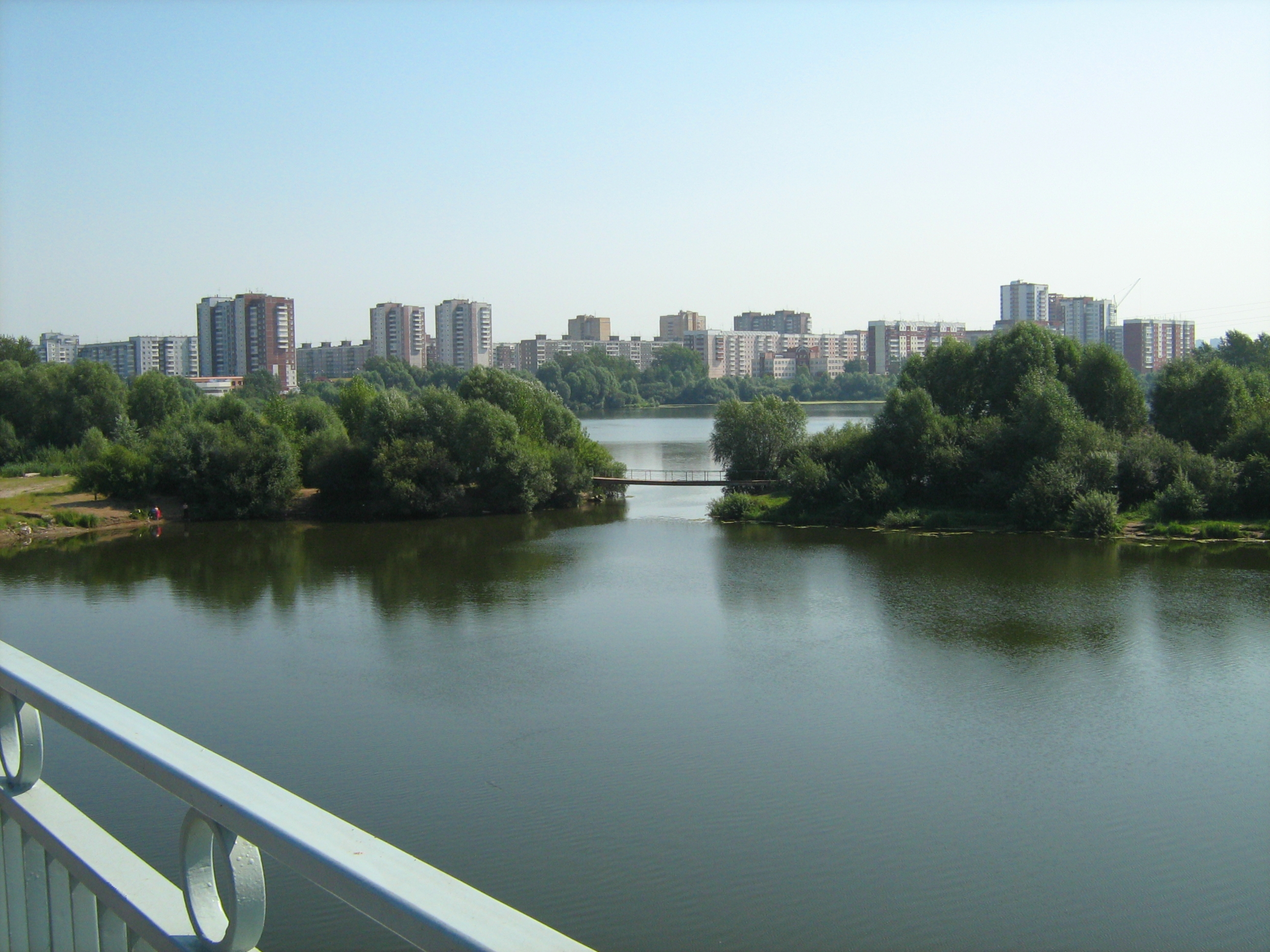
View from the bridge at Stroiteley Street

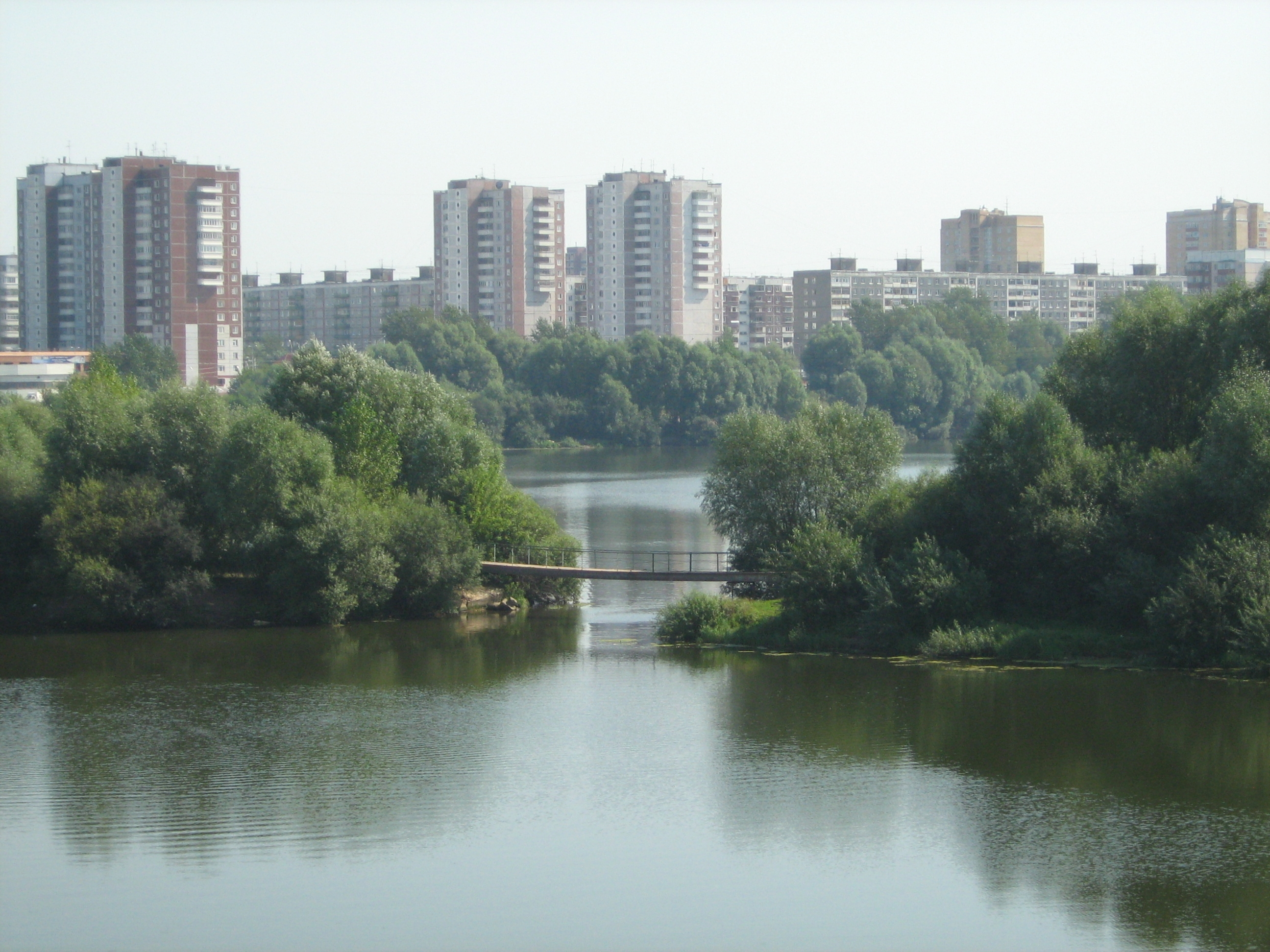
Close-up

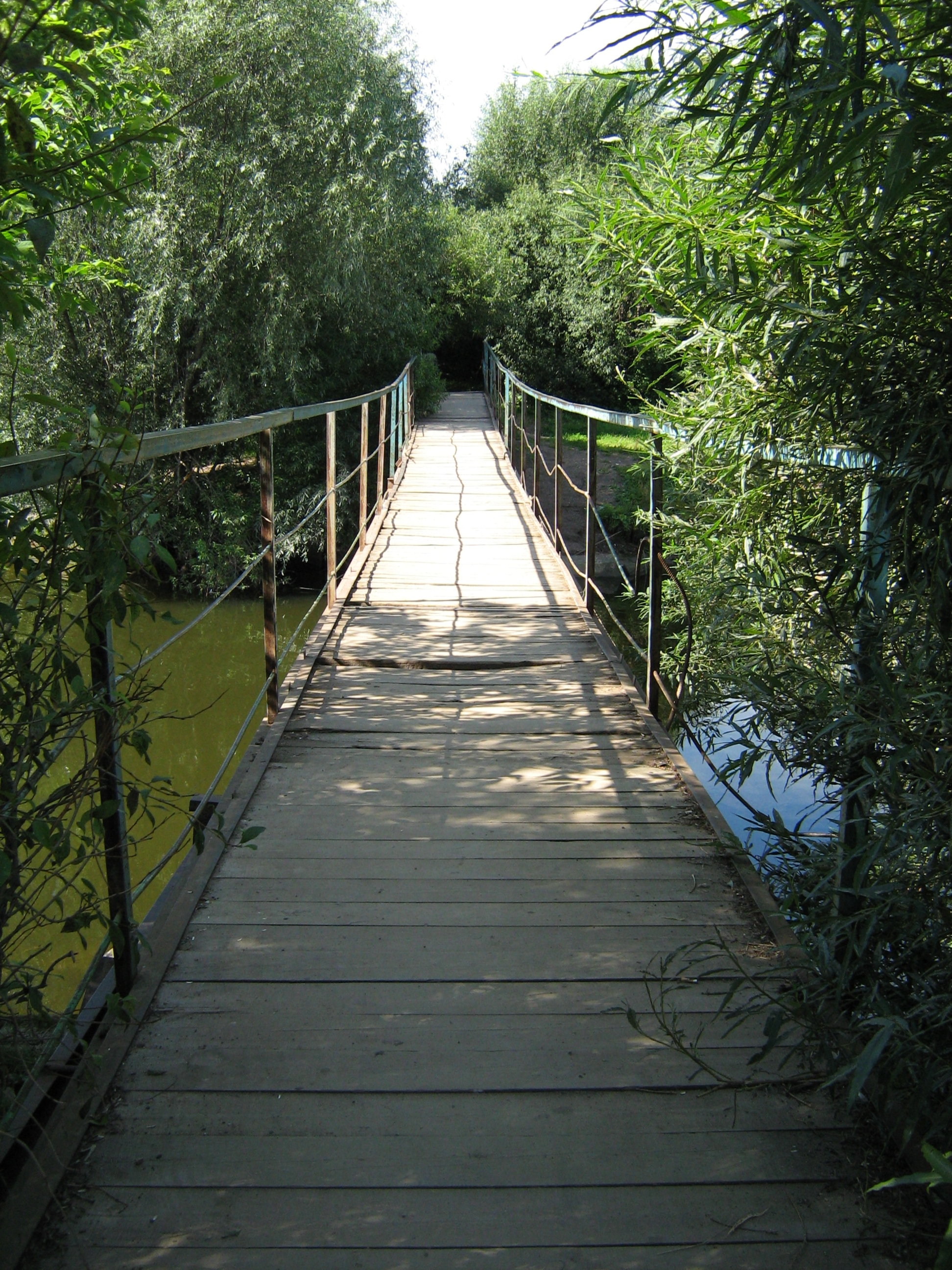
Entry to the bridge from the right bank
- The bridge at Stroiteley Street has been opened July 13, 2007. It connects Parkovy microdistrict with Krasavinsky bridge (over Kama River). It is 248 metres (814 ft) long. The construction of bridge began in 2005 and costs 796.26 million rubles.
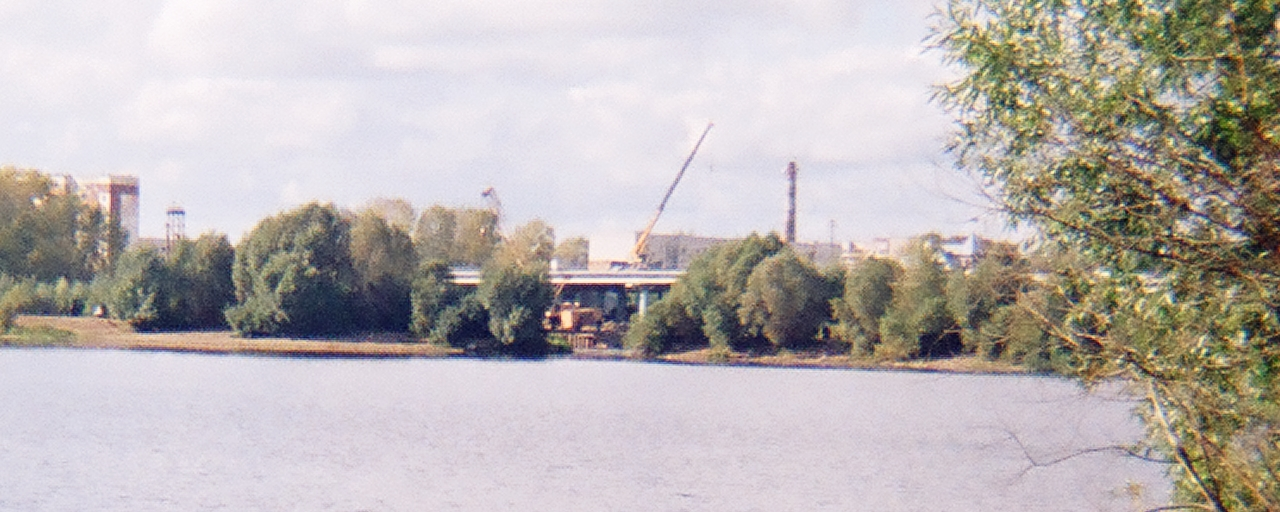
Bridge construction, 2006

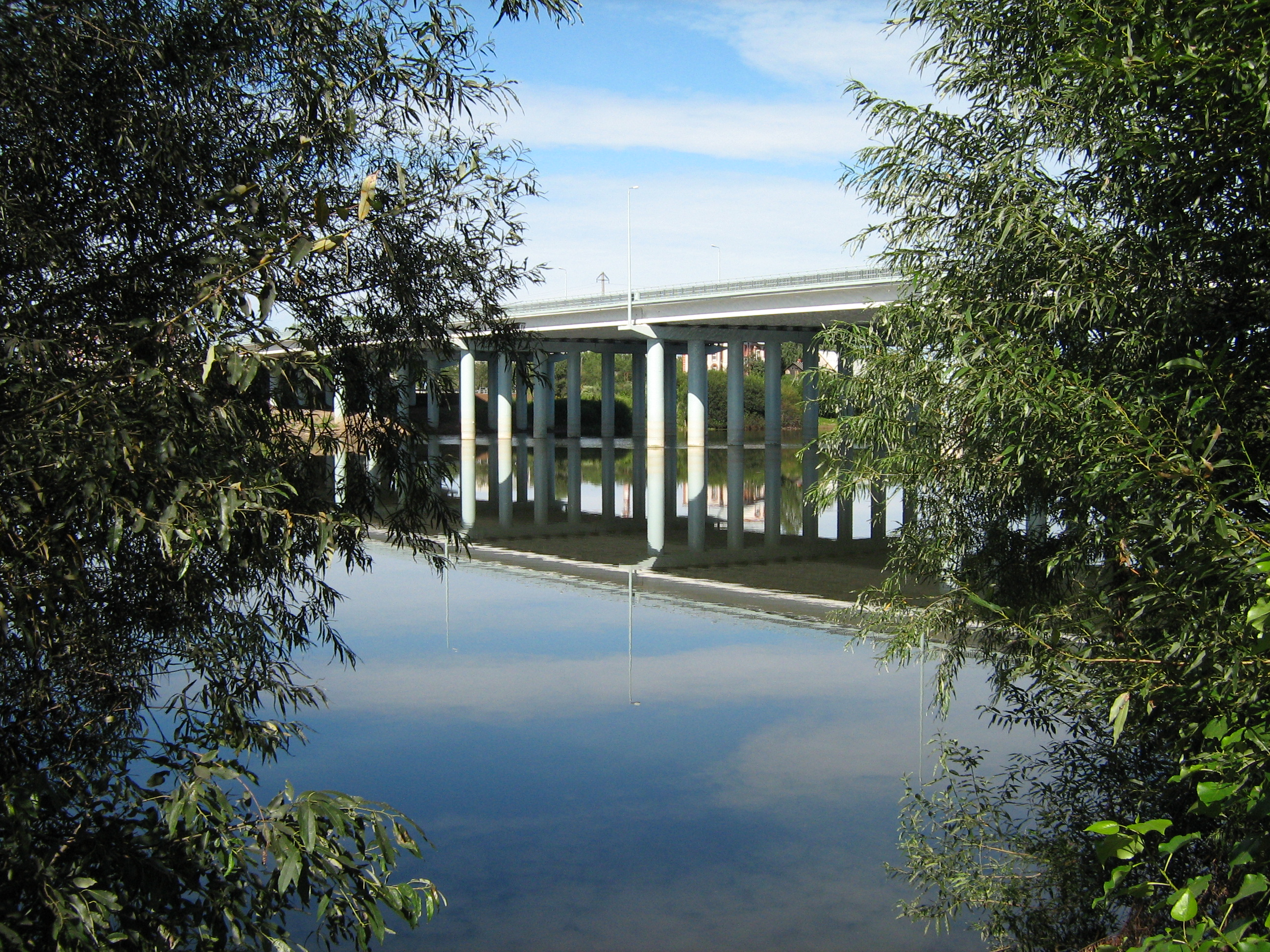
View from the right bank
- The bridge at Krasin Street.
- The bridge at 1st Trudovaya Street is last. It is situated near the mouth of the Mulyanka.

The mouth of the Mulyanka is in the Zheleznodorozhny microdistrict of Dzerzhinsky City District of Perm. The width of the Mulyanka is frequently changing and in some places reaches 400 metres (1,300 ft).

== Ship transport ==
Mulyanka is not included in the list of navigable rivers of Perm Krai, which consists of Kama, Vishera, Sylva, and Chusovaya.

== History ==
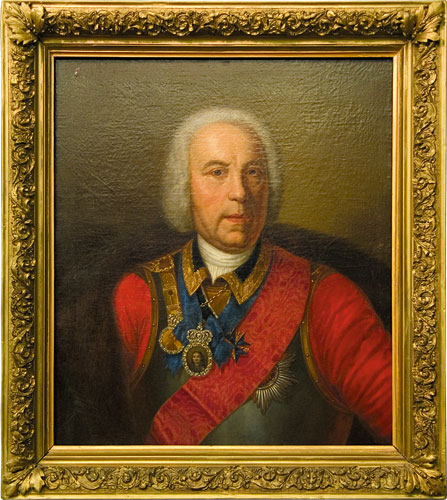
G. W. de Gennin

Unlike most rivers of Perm Krai, whose toponymy is considered to be Permic, the names of rivers of Upper Mulyanka and Lower Mulyanka came from the Persian word "mullah". The researchers of history of Perm Krai connect it with Tatarian prince Mametkul, who settled in the region before or during the reign of Ivan the Terrible and was an imam, or mullah. His elder son, Urak-bey Mametkulov, lived at the Upper Mulyanka, and the younger son, Irak-bey Syundyuk-bey Mametkulov lived at the Lower Mulyanka. So came the names of this rivers and the villages Verkhniye Mully (meaning, 'The Upper Mullahs') and Nizhniye Mully ('The Lower Mullahs'), respectively. More old Pre-Turkic names of this rivers were lost.

In 1722, Georg Wilhelm de Gennin, manager of Ural State Factories and master Cimmerman, took samples of copper ore from the banks of Mulyanka. The test results confirmed de Gennin's intention to start the construction of Yegoshikha copper smelting factory which resulted in the foundation of Perm city.

== Ecology ==
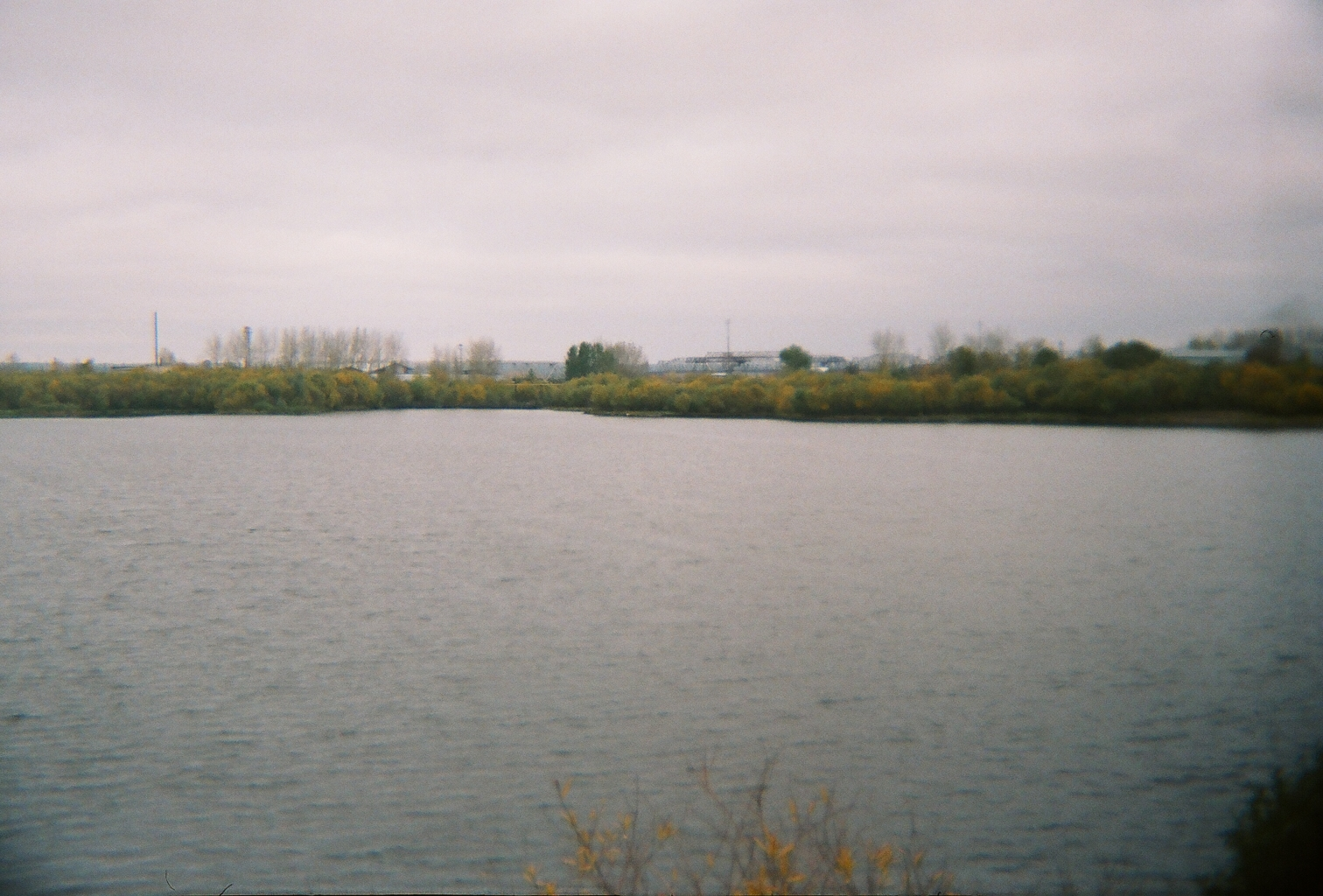
View of Mulyanka from the bridge at Krasin Street

Mulyanka runs along the borders of the city of Perm and is contaminated by industrial waste, such at that of stock-breeding farms and sawmills. Mulyanka is influenced by the adjacency of oil refinery of Lukoil-Permnefteorgsintez which was put into operation in 1958.

=== Chemical composition ===
According to a 2004 report by the Perm Oblast's Administration of Environment Protection, water in the Mulyanka River belongs to the 2nd to 3rd class of quality, but the upper waters, taking into account nitrites, iron and oxygen content, belong to the 4th class. This makes it unsuitable for drinking and fish farming even after preliminary processing. The oxygen mode in the river is found to be unfavorable. The chemical consumption of oxygen amounts to 40–70 mg/L while the norm is 30 mg/L; the biochemical consumption is 5.15–7.08 mg/L, while norm is 5 mg/L. The concentration of suspended substances is 11–18 mg/L.

=== Condition of zoobenthos ===
According to the results of research, performed by experts of Perm State University, the pollution of Mulyanka exercises strong negative influence on the condition of zoobenthos. Middle and lower parts of river are the most polluted ones. The biggest source of pollution is Lukoil Permneft Ltd, whose waste reaches Mulyanka by the Pyzh River. The oil products content of Mulyanka water at the place of the Pyzh's confluence exceeds the Maximum Permissible Concentration 49.4 times. Close to the mouth of Mulyanka ammonium content exceeds the MPC 1.3 times, 2.5 times for nitrites and 2 times for the oil products. As a result of bottom fauna sample analysis, 75 species have been discovered: ten species of Oligochaeta, two species of Hirudinea, six species of Gastropoda, two species of Bivalvia, and 55 species of Insecta. The distribution of macrozoobenthos in different sectors of the river is:

River sector	Number of species	Biomass, g/m²	Quantity, thousands of specimens per m²
High	53	57,9	4,8
Middle	23	11,8	1,2
Lower	24	4,8	

=== Research by young ecologists ===
In 2003, a group of young ecologists from the School #6 of Perm city and the School of Kultayevo Village performed an investigation of the ecological condition of water in the Mulyanka River within the project titled Ecological condition of small rivers of Perm City and suburb zone. The samples of water were taken close to Kultayevo Village and near the river mouth in Parkovy microdistrict. The chemical analysis of water was performed in the Ecological Laboratory of Chemistry chair in the Perm State Pedagogical University. The research showed that chemical composition of Mulyanka water was different inside and outside the city. The data obtained demonstrated that "the water in the Mulyanka river isn't suitable for drinking".

In 2005, pupils from the School #59 of Perm City took part in the DOOG—2005 "Remote Educational Contest in Geography" and performed an experiment entitled “Purification of water from the Mulyanka River”. The results are presented in the table:

Water	Before purification	After the settling	After the filtration through the sand	After the absorption with coal
Smell	light smell of slime	no	This stage of purification wasn't performed because the Mulyanka water sample happened to be clean enough.	no
Transparency	turbid	slightly turbid	This stage of purification wasn't performed because the Mulyanka water sample happened to be clean enough.	transparent
Colour	light yellow hue	light-coloured	This stage of purification wasn't performed because the Mulyanka water sample happened to be clean enough.	light-coloured
Presence of oil drops	no	no	This stage of purification wasn't performed because the Mulyanka water sample happened to be clean enough.	no
Presence of solid particles	no	no	This stage of purification wasn't performed because the Mulyanka water sample happened to be clean enough.	no
Water volume	100 mL	96 mL	This stage of purification wasn't performed because the Mulyanka water sample happened to be clean enough.	85 mL

As a result of the experiment, the conclusion was made: "water, taken from the Mulyanka River, may be purified by settling, filtration and absorption". This work was rewarded the Second degree DOOG-2005 diploma.
