= Parkovy Microdistrict =

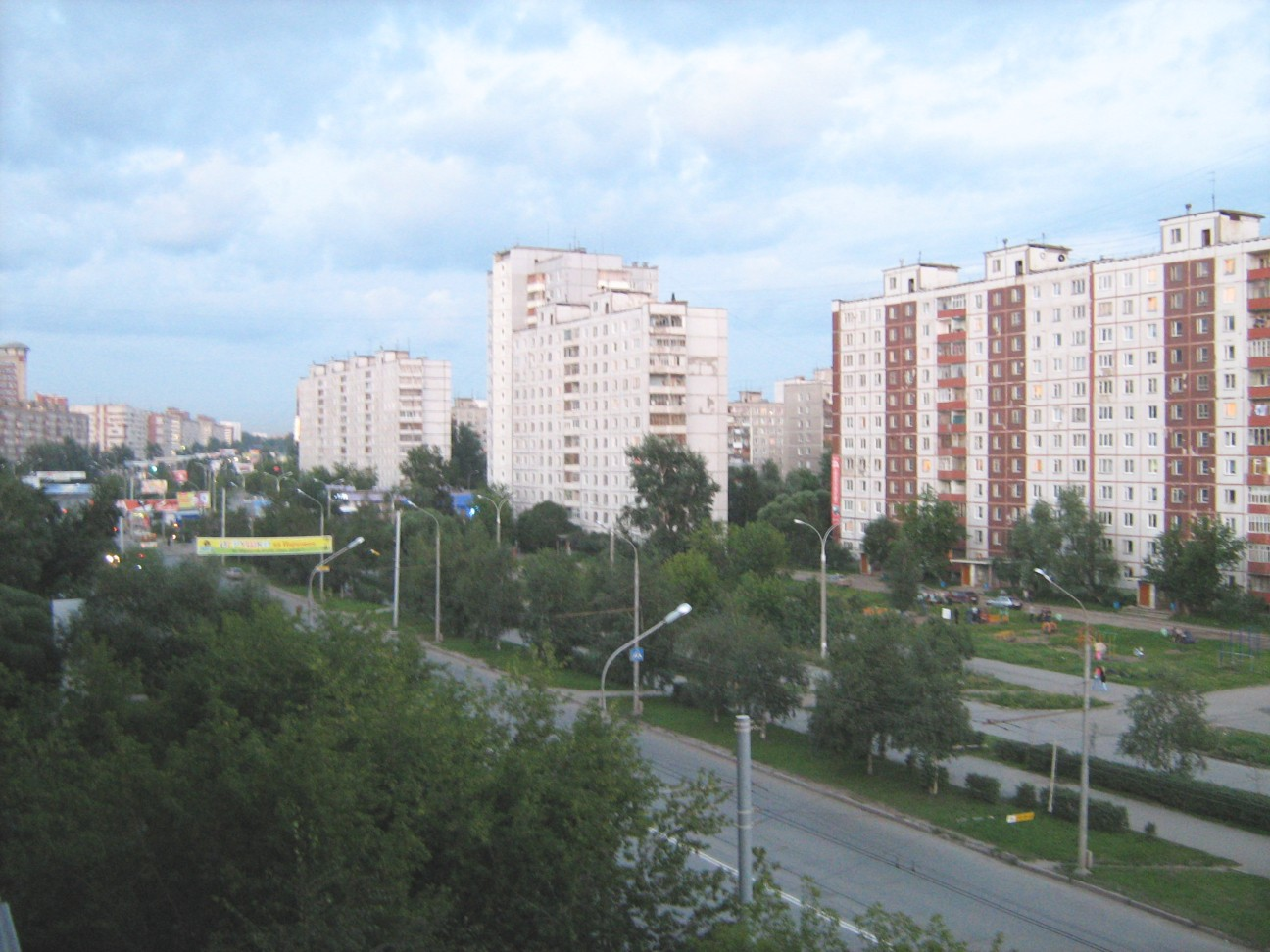
Parkovy Avenue in the evening

Parkovy (Russian: Парковый) is a microdistrict of Perm. It is situated in the left-bank part of Dzerzhinsky City District.

== Geography ==
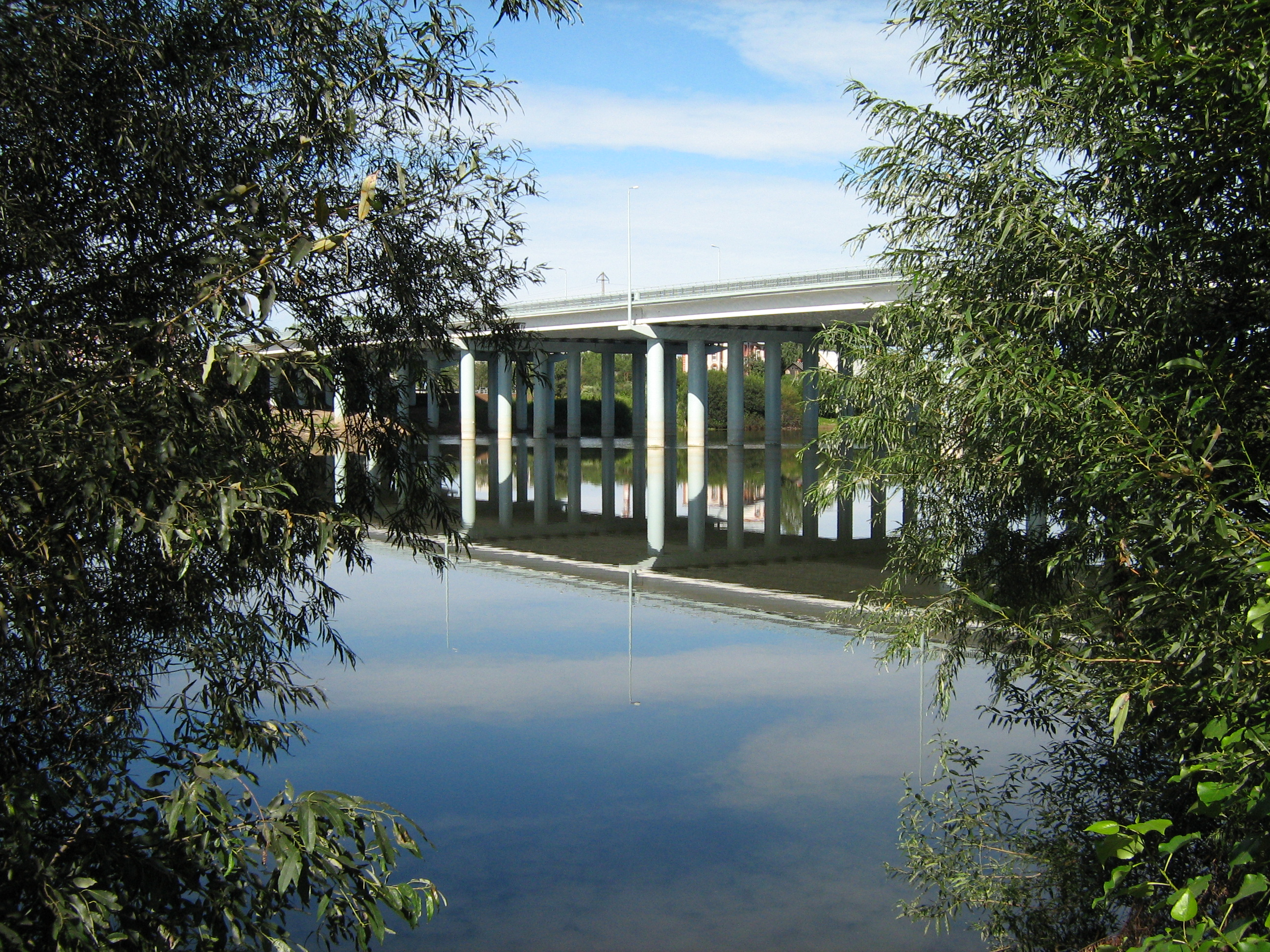
Bridge over Mulyanka River at Stroiteley Street

The Mulyanka River flows along the eastern outskirts of the microdistrict and separates it from Zaostrovka microdistrict. Within Parkovy, it is crossed by three bridges:

- A pedestrian bridge.
- A bridge at the Stroiteley Street opened on June 13, 2007. It connects Parkovy microdistrict to Krasavinsky Bridge over the Kama River.
- A bridge at the Krasin Street.

The southern side of Parkovy adjoins the Chernyayevsky Forest.

== History ==
The microdistrict was built in 1970-s in the place of settlement named Shpalny. The project of layout was performed by architect A. P. Zagorodnikov together with I. A. Plotnikova, head of architectural planning group of Permgrazhdanproyekt Institute. During the building of microdistrict an excavation of soil from the Mulyanka River was carried out. Parkovy was built with the houses of 97th line. New dwellers began to move into houses in 1976.

In 2007, within the framework of program "Ensuring of private and public security in Prikamye" Parkovy became the first microdistrict in Perm where video inspection system was installed. The system consist of 70 cameras on the buildings and high-speed cameras on the cross-roads intended to watch over the traffic regulation offenders and stolen cars. Yury Gorlov, chief of Perm Krai Department of MVD, said in this connection:

… it is necessary that the system itself should reveal offences, such as crossing the solid line and driving onto the opposite strip. Any motor transport being in search and entering Parkovy should be displayed on the operator's screen and arrested by on-duty squad. The governor gave some directions and remarks to developers of the system. They should be taken into account and examined as soon as possible.

On July 22, 2007 at the Zoya Kosmodemyanskaya Street test of first Russian patrol robot R-BOT 001 was carried out.

== Streets ==
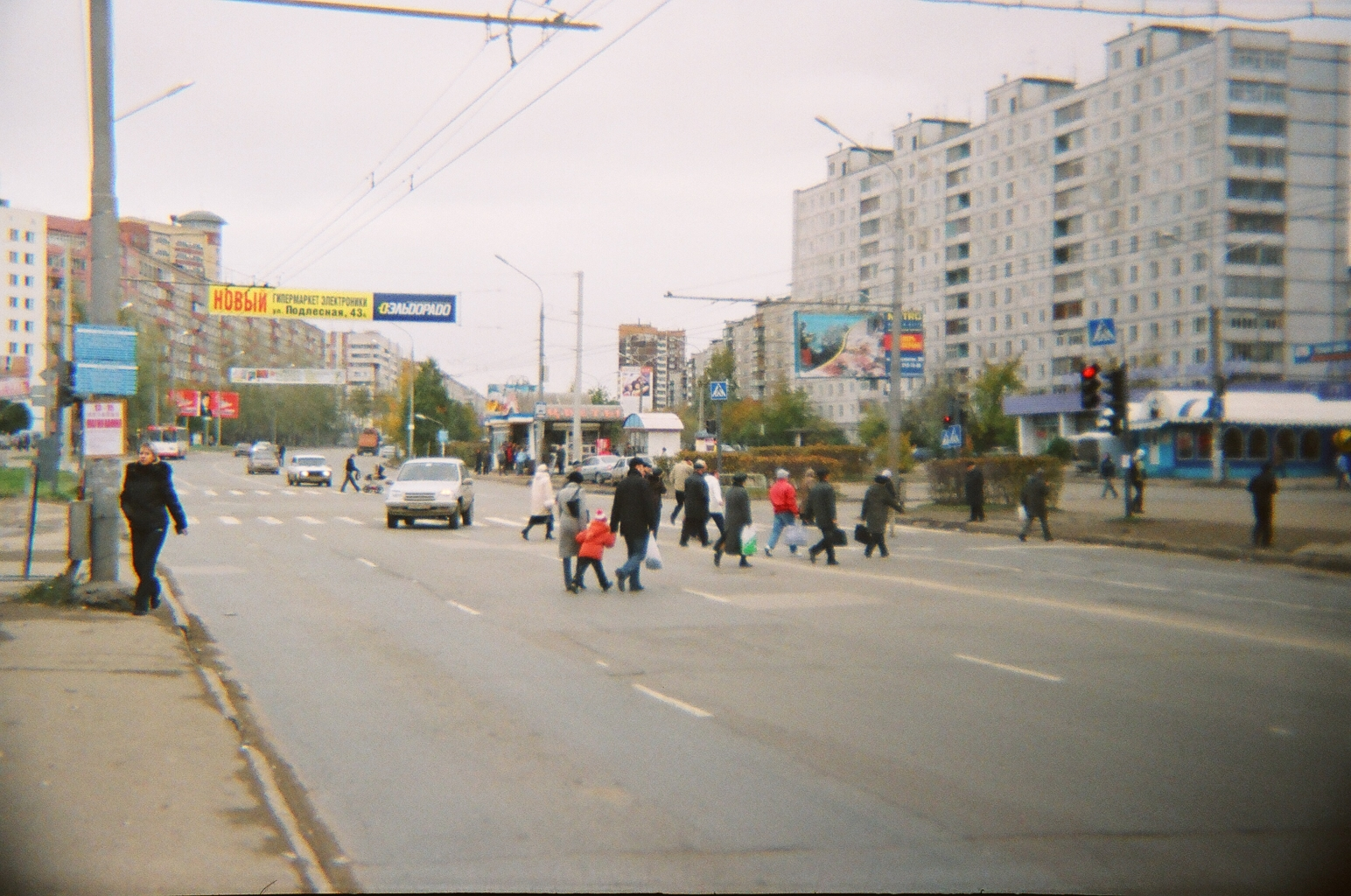
Crossing of Parkovy Avenue and Pozharsky Street

The largest latitudinal streets:

- Parkovy Avenue;
- Podlesnaya Street.

The largest longitudinal streets (from east to west):

- Kufonin Street;
- Zhelyabov Street;
- Commissar Pozharsky Street;
- Zoya Kosmodemyanskaya Street.
