= Brian Sparks =

Welsh rugby player (1931–2013)

Personal information
- Full name: Brian Anthonie Sparks MBE
- Born: 23 June 1931 Llanharan, Wales
- Died: 30 June 2013 (age 82) Bridgend, Wales

Playing information
- Height: 5 ft 10 in (178 cm)
- Weight: 15 st 0 lb (95 kg)

Rugby union
- Position: Flanker
Club
Years	Team	Pld	T	G	FG	P
≤1953–≤53	Pontypool RFC
≤1953–≤53	Bridgend RFC
1953–≤57	Neath RFC	100+
	Glamorgan Police RFC
≤1956–≤57	Torquay Athletic RFC
	Barbarian F.C.
	Total	100	0	0	0	0
Representative
Years	Team	Pld	T	G	FG	P
	Devon
1954–57	Wales	7	0	0	0	0

Rugby league
Club
Years	Team	Pld	T	G	FG	P
Dec 1957–61	Halifax	115

Brian Anthonie Sparks MBE (23 June 1931 – 30 June 2013) was a Welsh police officer, teacher, head teacher, founder-chairman of the Welsh Schools Basketball Association in 1963, and rugby union, and professional rugby league footballer who played in the 1950s and 1960s. He played representative level rugby union (RU) for Wales and Devon, at invitational level for Barbarian F.C., and at club level for Pontypool RFC, Bridgend RFC, Neath RFC, Glamorgan Police RFC, Torquay Athletic RFC, and St. Luke's College (captain) in the Middlesex Sevens Final victory of 1957, as a Flanker, and club level rugby league (RL) for Halifax (captain).

== Background ==
Brian Sparks was born in Llanharan, Wales, and educated at Cowbridge Grammar School. He died aged 82 in Bridgend, Wales, his funeral took place on Monday 8 July 2013 at Coychurch Crematorium.

== Playing career ==
=== International honours ===
Brian Sparks won caps for Wales (RU) while at Neath RFC in 1954 against Ireland, in 1955 against England, and France, in 1956 against England, Scotland, and Ireland, and in 1957 Scotland, he was the fortieth police officer to be capped by Wales.

=== Club career ===
Brian Sparks signed for Halifax from Neath RFC in 1957 for a signing-on fee of £1800 (based on increases in average earnings, this would be approximately £91,120 in 2013), and made a try-scoring début against Hunslet on Saturday 28 December 1957, he played in the defeat by Wigan in the 1959 Challenge Cup during the 1958–59 season at Thrum Hall, Halifax in 1959, in front of 29,153 Fans, he also played, and was captain, in the defeat by Wigan in the 1961 Challenge Cup semi-final during the 1960–61 season in March 1961.

== Outside of rugby ==
Brian Sparks was a police officer in Neath, he studied teacher training at St. Luke's College, University of Exeter, and became a mathematics, and physical education teacher at Exley County Secondary Modern School in Exley, Halifax, and head teacher at Tynyrheol Primary School in Llangeinor, he was the founder-chairman of the Welsh Schools Basketball Association in 1963, in 1974 he undertook a Churchill Fellowship to study schools' basketball in USA, he was an active member in Neath RFC Former Players' Association, and in 2012 he received an MBE for services to schools' basketball in Wales.
