= Alexander Nedorezkov =

Russian serial killer (1980-2005)

- Born: Alexander Viktorovich Nedorezkov; 1980; Perm, Perm Oblast, RSFSR
- Died: 26 October 2005 (aged 24–25); SIZO-1, Perm, Perm Krai, Russia
- Cause of death: Suicide by hanging
- Other names: "The Rampant Maniac" "Hellbound"
- Convictions: Fraud; Robbery; Causing grievous bodily harm
- Penalty: 2 years suspended sentence (fraud); 3 years and 3 months imprisonment (robbery); 3 years imprisonment (bodily harm)

Details
- Victims: 5–7
- Span of crimes: July – August 2005
- Country: Russia
- State: Perm
- Date apprehended: 16 September 2005

Alexander Viktorovich Nedorezkov (Russian: Александр Викторович Недорезков; 1980 – 26 October 2005), known as The Rampant Maniac (Russian: Маньяк-беспредельщик), was a Russian serial killer, mass murderer and rapist who committed five, possibly seven, murders in Perm, Perm Krai between July to August 2005. Due to the fact that the killings occurred shortly after his release from prison, the case garnered outrage and discussion about the lax treatment of violent recidivist offenders.

Following his arrest, Nedorezkov confessed to all the murders, additionally claiming responsibility for two other murders which were never conclusively verified. Before he could be put on trial, however, Nedorezkov hanged himself in a pre-trial detention center.

== Early life ==
Alexander Nedorezkov was born in Perm, Perm Oblast in 1980, and had one sister. From an early age, the young Nedorezkov exhibited destructive and deviant behavior towards others—according to him, he would catch stray cats, torture them, and then kill them. He had no interest in studying and had a reputation as a bully, due to which he was despised by both his peers and school staff alike.

With the exception of periods when he was serving prison sentences, Nedorezkov spent the entirety of his life in Zakamsk, a microdistrict located in the Kirovsky City District on the right bank of the Kama River. He later claimed that he had thalassophilia — a strong love for bodies of water — as a result of which Nedorezkov spent almost all of his free time on the riverbank fishing.

=== Early crimes ===
In the late 1990s, Nedorezkov began committing crimes, mostly consisting of robberies and fraud. At the age of 19, Nedorezkov was arrested for a fraud charge, for which he was given a two-year suspended sentence. Five months later, he was arrested for a robbery, and after being convicted, Nedorezkov was sentenced to serve 3 years and 3 months at an unidentified correctional facility.

After serving the sentence in full, Nedorezkov spent only approximately a month in liberty before being arrested for causing grievous bodily harm to another person. He was again found guilty and convicted, but despite the fact that he was a repeat offender, Nedorezkov was given another lenient sentence of only 3 years imprisonment.

Nedorezkov was paroled after serving only a year and a half of his sentence, and then returned to Zakamsk. During this time, he became a recluse, avoided interacting with anyone and spent most of his free time aimlessly wandering the streets.

== Murders ==
=== Nikolai Slastunov ===
Three days after his release, on 14 July 2005, Nedorezkov committed his first murder. According to the materials of the unfinished criminal case, on that day, during the daytime, he was walking along a dirt road near Kirovogradskaya Street when he accidentally bumped into 59-year-old Nikolai Slastunov, who was picking mushrooms. Nedorezkov claimed that this accident led to him arguing with the older man, asking him why he couldn't just walk around. In response, Slastunov supposedly started swearing at him. Angered, Nedorezkov struck him with a glass bottle he was carrying, causing Slastunov to fall to the ground. He then continued to beat him repeatedly with a pine stick, and in order to finish him off, Nedorezkov strangled the man with his own shirt.

=== Sokolskaya Street massacre ===
On the evening of 12 August, Nedorezkov decided to visit his 23-year-old acquaintance Sergei Valuev, who lived with his family at an apartment on 26 2nd Sokolskaya Street. Valuev had previously been incarcerated for using drugs, but later became a model family man and, in general, led a respectable lifestyle, while his family completely trusted Nedorezkov because Valuev's wife Lyubov was a former classmate of his sister. On that evening, the family was celebrating Builder's Day.

After partaking in the festivities and everyone went to sleep, Nedorezkov decided to stay overnight, but was unable to sleep due to insomnia. He got up, went to the kitchen, and supposedly saw silhouettes behind one of the curtains, causing him to suddenly snap. Shortly afterwards, he armed himself with some dumbbells and went inside one of the rooms, where hit Lyubov's mother, 48-year-old Tatyana Shilonosova, several times on the head. When she fell out of the bed, Nedorezkov proceeded to stab her several times in the stomach with a butterfly knife. At that moment, Valuev's 4-year-old daughter Anya woke up and started screaming, prompting Nedorezkov to rape and then bludgeon her to death, a fact which he later denied.

Following this, Nedorezkov went in the adjacent room, where he struck Valuev several times on the head with the dumbbell and then stabbed him in the torso with a kitchen knife. Nedorezkov then attempted to remove the underwear of Tatyana–who, up until then, was still sleeping–accidentally waking her up in the process. He then informed her that he had killed her family and that she would be next. Supposedly, Shilonosova accepted her fate calmly, but attempted to influence Nedorezkov, saying that she was tired of her husband and that he had done the right thing. After sexually abusing her, Tatyana supposedly asked to be killed by strangulation, to which he agreed. Nedorezkov claimed that Shilonosova wrapped an electric cord around her neck, which he wrapped around a second time, tightened, and then squeezed hard for seven minutes before ultimately deciding to stab her to death.

Before fleeing the crime scene, Nedorezkov stole several items, including a telephone; an electric alarm clock; a camera, and a windbreaker jacket belonging to Valuev. He also stole 2,450 rubles that Shilonosova had given him earlier in the night.

=== Mass outrage and Berezniki attacks ===
The mass murder caused widespread outrage across the Perm Krai, prompting citizens to unite together in an attempt to track down the killer. Nedorezkov was quickly identified as the prime suspect, and an arrest warrant was issued for him. Upon learning of this, Nedorezkov fled Perm at the end of August and went to Berezniki, where he lived on the streets and attacked teenage girls in the forest on the outskirts of the city.

On 2 September, at around 6 PM, he was walking around the city park when he noticed a 15-year-old teenager returning home from school. Nedorezkov attacked her, dragged her into the bushes near a path, and raped her. At the same time, he intimidated her by saying that he had five corpses on his conscience and was wanted by police, and also flirted with her, asking if she liked his tattoos.

Six days later, at the same location, Nedorezkov would carry out another attack. At around 3 PM, he accosted a 13-year-old girl walking home from school, but the victim fiercely resisted, screaming and calling for help, biting at her assailant's finger with all her strength. Fearing that his finger would be severed, Nedorezkov took out a knife and stabbed the girl several times in the neck and sides, after which he fled. Despite her injuries, the victim survived and dragged herself to the nearest busy road, where an ambulance was called and she was hospitalized.

== Arrest, confessions, and death ==
Left without any money in a city he was unfamiliar with, Nedorezkov eventually returned to Perm, where he would soon be arrested. On 16 September 2005, the police received a report that a man matching Nedorezkov's description was at the Volgodonsky mini-market. A unit of police officers was dispatched to arrest him, and when he noticed them, Nedorezkov attempted to run away, but was soon subdued.

Soon after his arrest, Nedorezkov confessed to all the murders and began to cooperate with investigators, taking part in investigative experiments to recreate how he carried out the crimes. He gave a detailed account of all the murders, but steadfastly denied raping 4-year-old Anya – once the results of the autopsy disproved this claim, he made no comment. In addition to his proven crimes, Nedorezkov claimed that he had killed two others–a homeless man and an elderly woman–sometime after his release from prison. However, authorities were unable to gather enough evidence to charge him with these two murders.

On 23 September, journalist Larisa Kolchakova visited Nedorezkov in the pre-trial detention center to conduct a brief interview. During said interview, Nedorezkov attempted to feign remorse – he claimed that he would "tear apart" the terrorists responsible for the Beslan school siege and that he had attempted to kill himself multiple times after the murders. He also showed her his tattoos, one of which had "Hellbound" inscribed on his neck, while the second was a bloody teardrop on one of his cheeks, supposedly symbolizing his mourning for the victims.

This interview was later broadcast to the local media, with journalists and investigators stating that they had high hopes Nedorezkov would admit to other murders. However, this never occurred, as Nedorezkov hanged himself in his solitary confinement cell on 26 October 2005. As a result, the criminal case against him was dismissed.

=== Criticism ===
Nedorezkov's capture led to severe criticism of the judicial system. The most notable of these was from Pavel Fadeev, deputy head of the Perm City Internal Affairs Directorate, who stated that the courts' leniency despite the escalating nature of Nedorezkov's crimes demonstrated an alarming incompetence and necessitated a re-evaluation of how to study and deal with recidivism.

== In the media and culture ==
Nedorezkov's crimes were covered on the episode "Sexual maniac Nedorezkov" (Russian: Сексуальный маньяк Недорезков) from the documentary series "Call 02" (Russian: Вызов 02), released in 2005.

== Books ==
- Antoine Casse and Irina Kapitanova (2023). The phenomenon of Russian maniacs. The first large-scale study of maniacs and serial killers from the times of tsarism, the USSR and the Russian Federation (Russian: Феномен российских маньяков. Первое масштабное исследование маньяков и серийных убийц времен царизма, СССР и РФ), Eksmo, ISBN 978-5-04-608118-3

== See also ==
- List of Russian serial killers
