= Malinovka (Perm Krai) =

River in Perm Krai, Russia

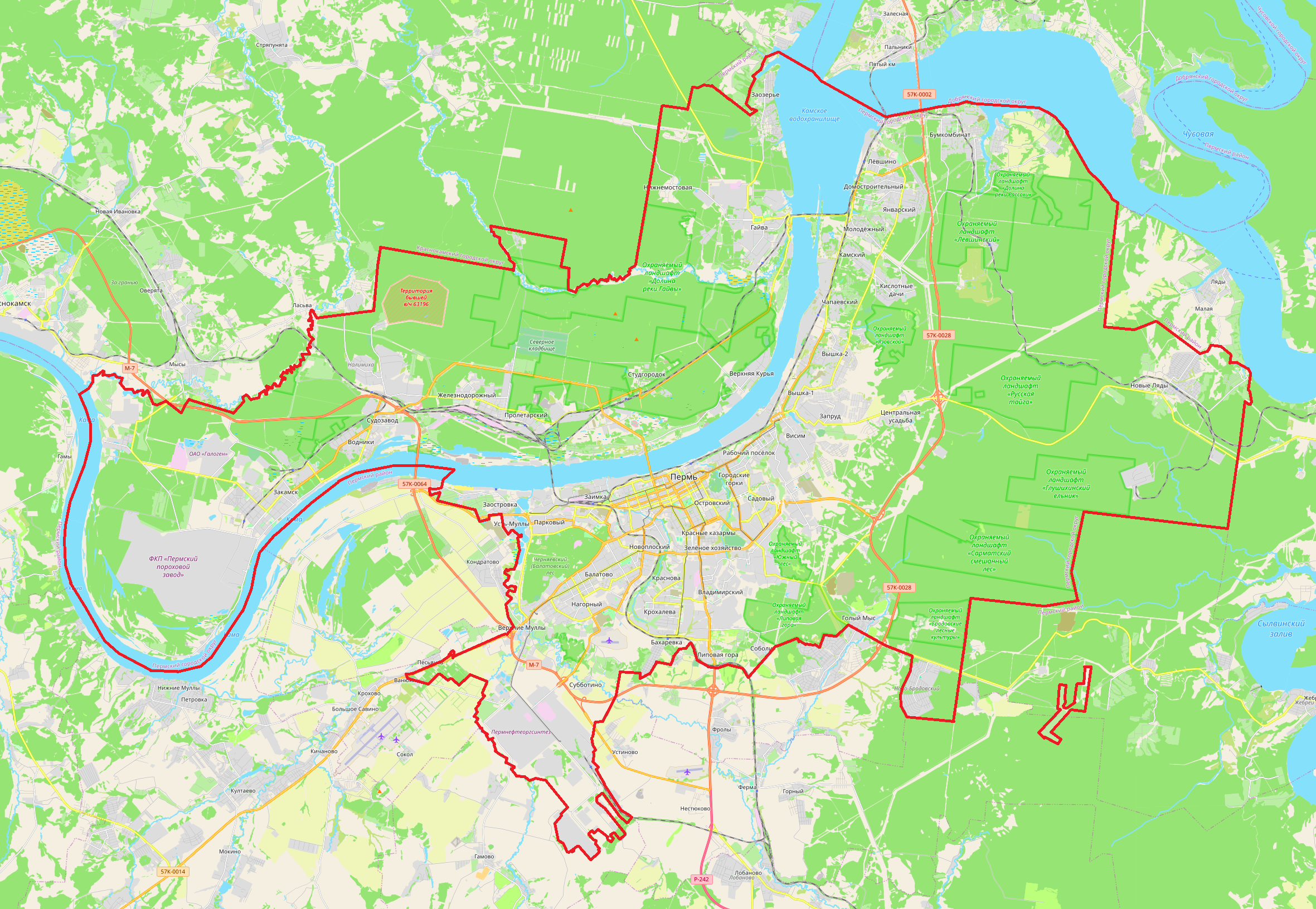
- Location of the Malinovka in Perm

Location
- Country: Russia

Physical characteristics
- Source
  - location: Industrialny City District of Perm
  - coordinates: 57.943478°N 56.210569°E
- Mouth
  - location: Mulyanka
  - coordinates: 57.929255°N 56.207368°E

Basin features
- Progression: Mulyanka→ Kama→ Volga→ Caspian Sea

The Malinovka (Russian: Малиновка) is a small river in Perm Krai, a right tributary of the Mulyanka. The source of Malinovka is situated in Industrialny City District of Perm. It flows in South direction. It is about 1.6 kilometers long.
