= Park Tunnel =

Park Tunnel may refer to:

- Park Tunnel, Nottingham, a road and later a pedestrian tunnel in Nottingham, England
- Phoenix Park Tunnel, a railway tunnel in Dublin, Ireland.
- Victoria Park Tunnel, a motorway tunnel in Auckland, New Zealand,

== See also ==
- Park Avenue Tunnel (disambiguation)
