= Park Avenue Tunnel =

Park Avenue Tunnel may refer to:

- Park Avenue main line, railroad line with a tunnel section carrying Metro-North Railroad
  - Park Avenue Tunnel (railroad), a railroad tunnel under Park Avenue in New York City
- Park Avenue Tunnel (roadway), a roadway tunnel under Park Avenue South in Murray Hill, in New York City
- Part of the IRT Lexington Avenue Line under Park Avenue, sometimes called the Park Avenue Tunnel

== See also ==
- Park Avenue (disambiguation)
- Park Avenue Line (disambiguation)
- Park Avenue Viaduct (disambiguation)
- Park Tunnel (disambiguation)
