= Park Avenue Line =

Park Avenue Line can refer to the following transit lines:

- Park Avenue Line (Brooklyn surface), former streetcar
- Park Avenue Line (Brooklyn elevated), former rapid transit
- Park Avenue Line (Manhattan surface), bus, formerly streetcar
- Park Avenue Line (Paterson), bus, formerly streetcar
- Park Avenue main line, tunnel and viaduct for Metro-North Railroad

== See also ==
- Park Avenue (disambiguation)
- Park Avenue Tunnel (disambiguation), various in Manhattan
- Park Avenue Viaduct (disambiguation)
