= Park Lane (disambiguation) =

Park Lane is a major road in the City of Westminster, in Central London.

Park Lane may also refer to:

== Buildings ==
- Park Lane (mall), a shopping mall in Halifax, Canada
- Park Lane (stadium), a rugby stadium in Whitefield, near Manchester, UK
- Park Lane Centre, a demolished mall in Reno, Nevada, USA
- Park Lane Hotel (Manhattan), former flagship of Harry Helmsley's hotel empire, New York, USA
- Park Lane by CMP, a shopping center in Taichung, Taiwan

== Other uses ==
- Park Lane Academy, a secondary school in Halifax, UK
- Park Lane College, a former college in Leeds and Keighley amalgamated into Leeds City College
- Park Lane (DART station), a light rail station in Dallas, Texas, USA
- Park Lane Interchange, a transport interchange in Sunderland, UK

== Streets ==
- Park Lane, Croydon, a road within Croydon
- Park Lane, Singapore, a road within Seletar Aerospace Park

== See also ==
- Lane Park, a large park in Birmingham, Alabama, USA
- Mercury Park Lane, a car produced by the Ford Motor Company
- parallel parking lane, a lane to park in, see Parallel parking
- Letters from the Fire, an American hard rock band previously known as Park Lane
