= Pyzh =

River in Perm Krai, Russia

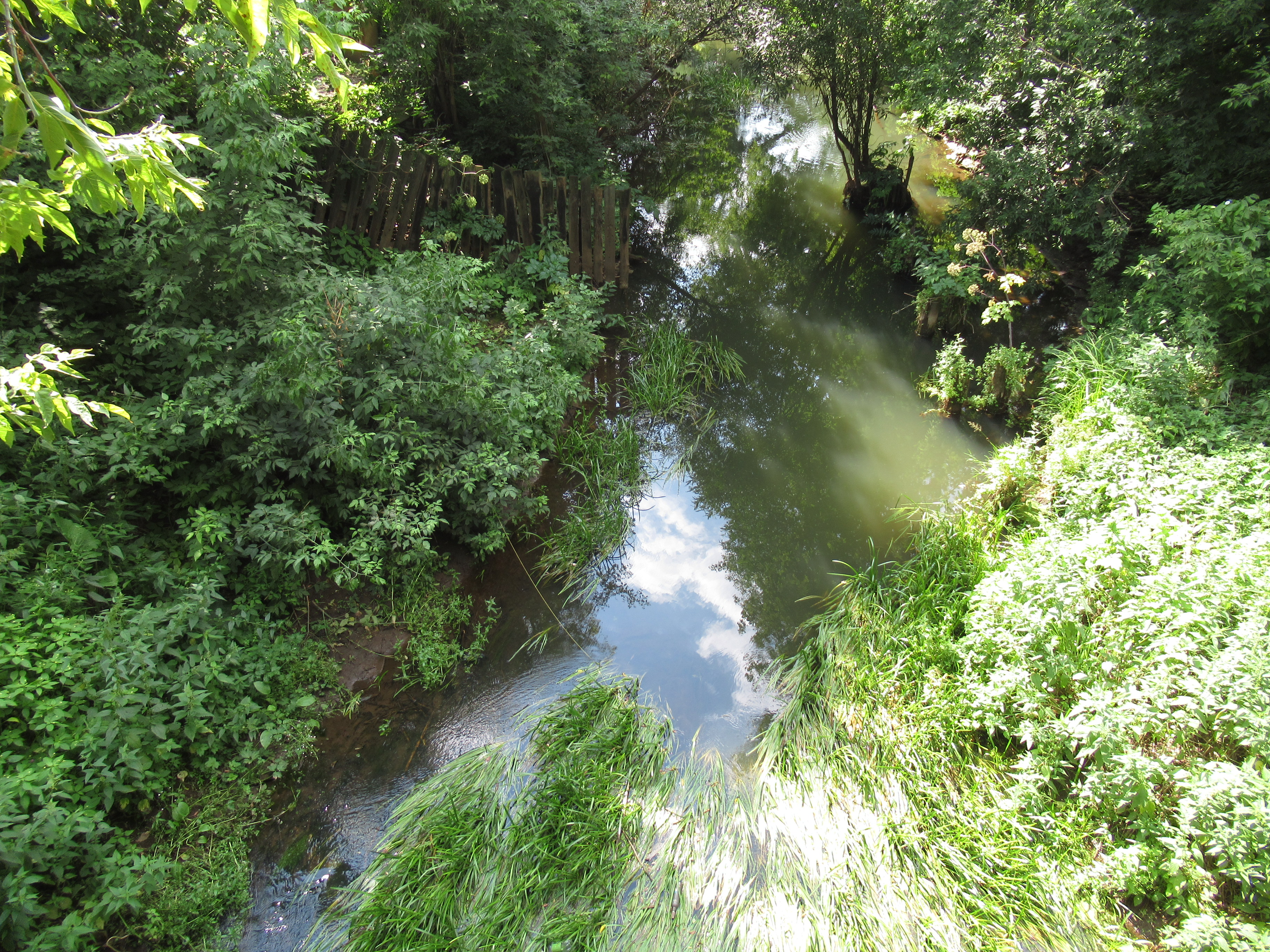

- Location within Perm Krai

Location
- Country: Russia

Physical characteristics
- Source
  - location: Permsky District of Perm Krai
- Mouth
  - location: Mulyanka
  - coordinates: 57°48′36″N 56°04′25″E
- Length: 22 km (14 mi)

Basin features
- Progression: Mulyanka→ Kama→ Volga→ Caspian Sea

The Pyzh (Russian: Пыж [ˈpɨʂ]) is a small river in Perm Krai, Russia, that flows through the city of Perm and nearby Permsky District and is the longest left tributary of the Mulyanka. The Pyzh forms part of the border of Perm. The Pyzh is 22 kilometres (14 mi) long.

The Pyzh is subject to pollution with industrial waste of JSC "LUKOIL-Permnefteorgsintez".
