= Georg Wilhelm de Gennin =

Russian engineer and officer (1665–1750)

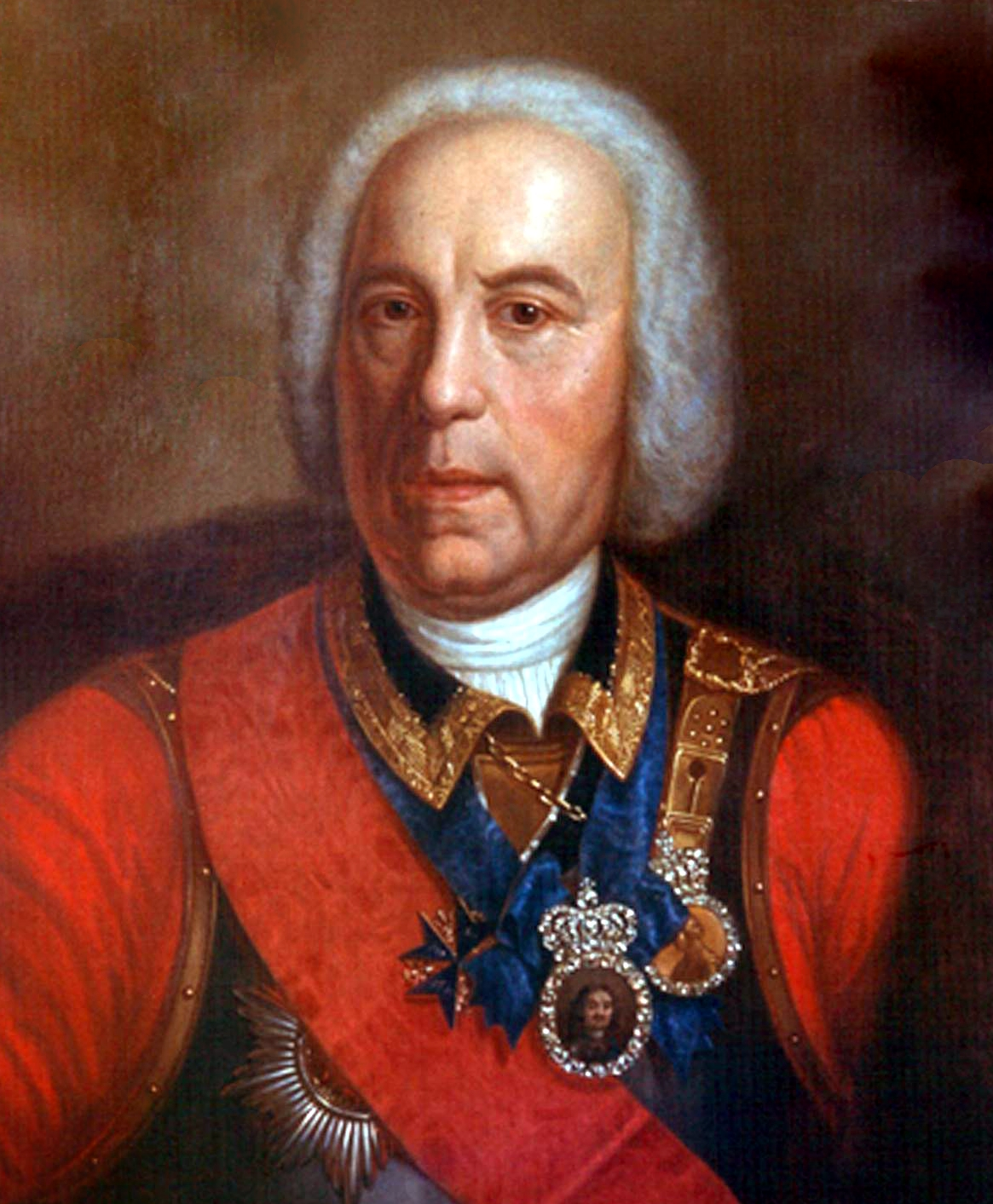
- Born: Georg Wilhelm Henning; 11 October 1665
- Died: 12 April 1750 (aged 84)
- Military career
- Allegiance: Russia
- Rank: Lieutenant General
- Conflicts: Great Northern War
- Awards: Order of Saint Alexander Nevsky
- Other work: Co-founder of Yekaterinburg and Perm, writer

Georg Wilhelm de Gennin (Russian: Георг Вильгельм де Геннин), also known as Vilim Ivanovich de Gennin (Russian: Вилим Иванович де Геннин; 11 October 1665 — 12 April 1750), was a German-born Russian military officer and engineer who specialized in mining, fortification, and metallurgy.

== Biography ==
He was born as Georg Wilhelm Henning on 11 October 1665 to a noble family, albeit one that was not of substantial means. The place of his birth has been of some contention with historians ranging speculation from Siegerland, then County of Nassau, Holy Roman Empire to Lower Saxony, or hailing from the Dutch Republic. He was baptized in Siegen as Georg Wilhelm Henning in 1676. He later changed his name to Gennin, which is easier to pronounce for Russian speakers.

During the Grand Embassy of Peter I in 1697, General Admiral Franz Lefort invited Gennin to join the Russian Imperial army. During the Great Northern War, Gennin excelled as an artillerist and fortification engineer. In 1700 he would be promoted to the rank of lieutenant for his work in teaching artillery skills to the military; later on, in 1701, he would be commissioned to fortify Nizhny Novgorod. He would then be promoted to captain in 1702 and then major in 1706 for his role in fortifying towns and planning sieges.

In 1713 Gennin would begin managing the iron foundries of Olonets and modernized the weapon factories of Povenetsky Uyezd, Koncheozersky, and Petrovsky. During this period he would participate in the founding of Petrozavodsk. At the foundries he would find the peasants unwilling to adopt more modern practices, instead he would find allies in the local, self-sufficient Old Believer communities of the Vygovskaya desert. His success would see him awarded the rank of Major General in 1722 and an order to relocate to the Ural region and sort out the conflict between Vasily Tatischev and Akinfiy Nikitich Demidov. He would also make a name for himself as an opponent of corruption amongst the subordinates in the bureaucracy he developed to manage the factories. Building on the work of Tatischev, Gennin's industrial developments would become the foundation of the cities of Yekaterinburg and Perm. In 1721 he would begin using copper ore found along the bank of the Mulyanka river to justify the creation of the Yegoshikha copper smelter. While in the region, he would also dam the Iset River creating a power source for an iron factory the Czar had established, he would be involved in establishing several factories reliant on rivers throughout the area.

Gennin would be invited as a witness for all accession ceremonies for the tsars that came after Peter I. He would make continuous attempts to have the crown relocate him to the capital, receiving awards in place of an order to return from the Ural region. In 1728, one such instance saw Gennin getting promoted to lieutenant general by Tsar Peter II rather than return him to the capital.

On 12 April 1750 Gennin died leaving behind two sons.

== Honors ==
In 1731 he was awarded an Order of Saint Alexander Nevsky knighthood.

== Culture ==
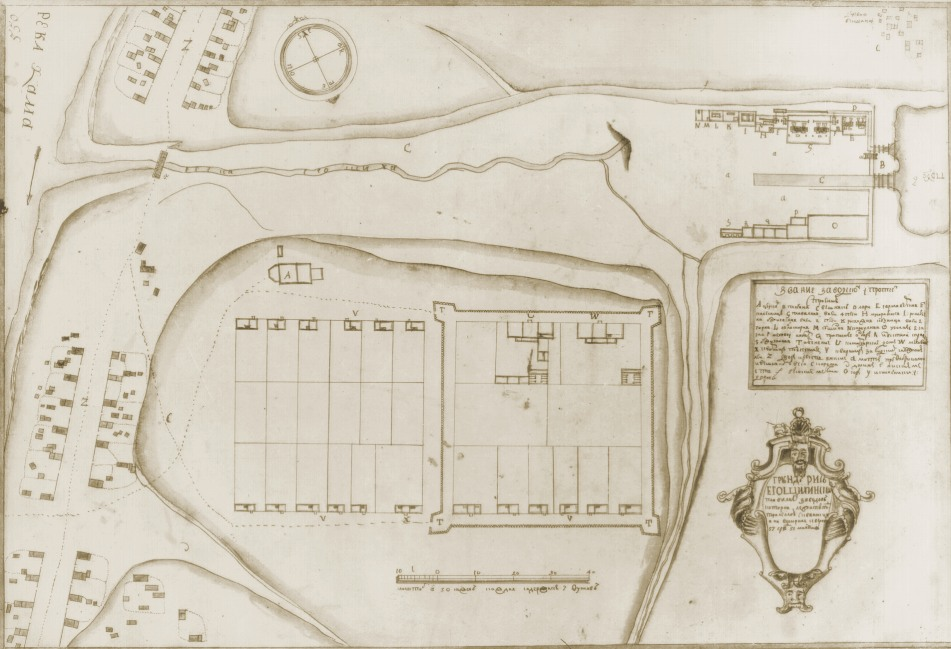
Plan of the Yegoshikha plant of the 1730-es from the Gennin album

Gennin was the author of the book "Description of Ural and Siberian factories", where for the first time he gives the geographical and historical description of the Perm Krai, including the Yagoshikhinskiy, Pyskorskiy and Suksunstiy factories with drawings. Gennin's sketches of Scythian era burial mounds in this work, these sketches would be utilized by other writers throughout the eighteenth and nineteenth centuries on the study of Scythian artifacts.

In 2012 the German photographer Thomas Kellner traveled to Russia on behalf of RWE to work in Ekaterinburg and Perm to photograph industrial architecture (Genius Loci) as both cities were founded by Georg Wilhelm de Gennin. The factories he founded processed steel and metal. Kellner photographed not only on site in Russia, but also in the surrounding area of Siegen to capture the connection between the two regions in the processing of steel and metal. Today the city of Yekaterinburg preserves the memory of its two founders in a monument located along Lenin Avenue.

== Published works ==
- (in Russian) Г. В. Геннин. Описание Уральских и Сибирских заводов. 1735. — М.: Гос. изд-во «История заводов», 1937 (Description of the Urals and Siberian Smelteries)

== Sources ==
- "Геннин, Вильгельм Иванович" . Brockhaus and Efron Encyclopedic Dictionary (in Russian). 1906.
- Энциклопедия Пермской области - ГЕННИН. (in Russian)
