= List of localities in Russia named Parkovy =

Parkovy (Russian: Парковый; masculine), Parkovaya (Парковая; feminine), or Parkovoye (Парковое; neuter) is the name of several rural localities in Russia:

- Parkovy, Krasnodar Krai, a settlement in Tikhoretsky District of Krasnodar Krai
- Parkovy, Vladimir Oblast, a selo in Yuryev-Polsky District of Vladimir Oblast
