= Park Avenue Historic District =

Park Avenue Historic District is the name of several historic districts, including:

(by state)

- Park Avenue Historic District (Denver, Colorado), a Denver Landmark
- Park Avenue Historic District (Tallahassee, Florida), a Tallahassee, Florida neighborhood listed on the National Register of Historic Places (NRHP)
- Park Avenue Historic District (Detroit), a Detroit neighborhood listed on the NRHP
- Park Avenue Apartment District, an Omaha, Nebraska neighborhood listed on the NRHP
- Park Avenue Historic District (Manhattan), a New York City neighborhood listed on the NRHP in Manhattan
- Park Avenue Houses, a New York City landmark listed on the NRHP
- Park Avenue Historic District (Rochester, New York), a Rochester, New York neighborhood listed on the NRHP
