= Nizhniye Mully =

Nizhniye Mully Нижние Муллы
- Selo
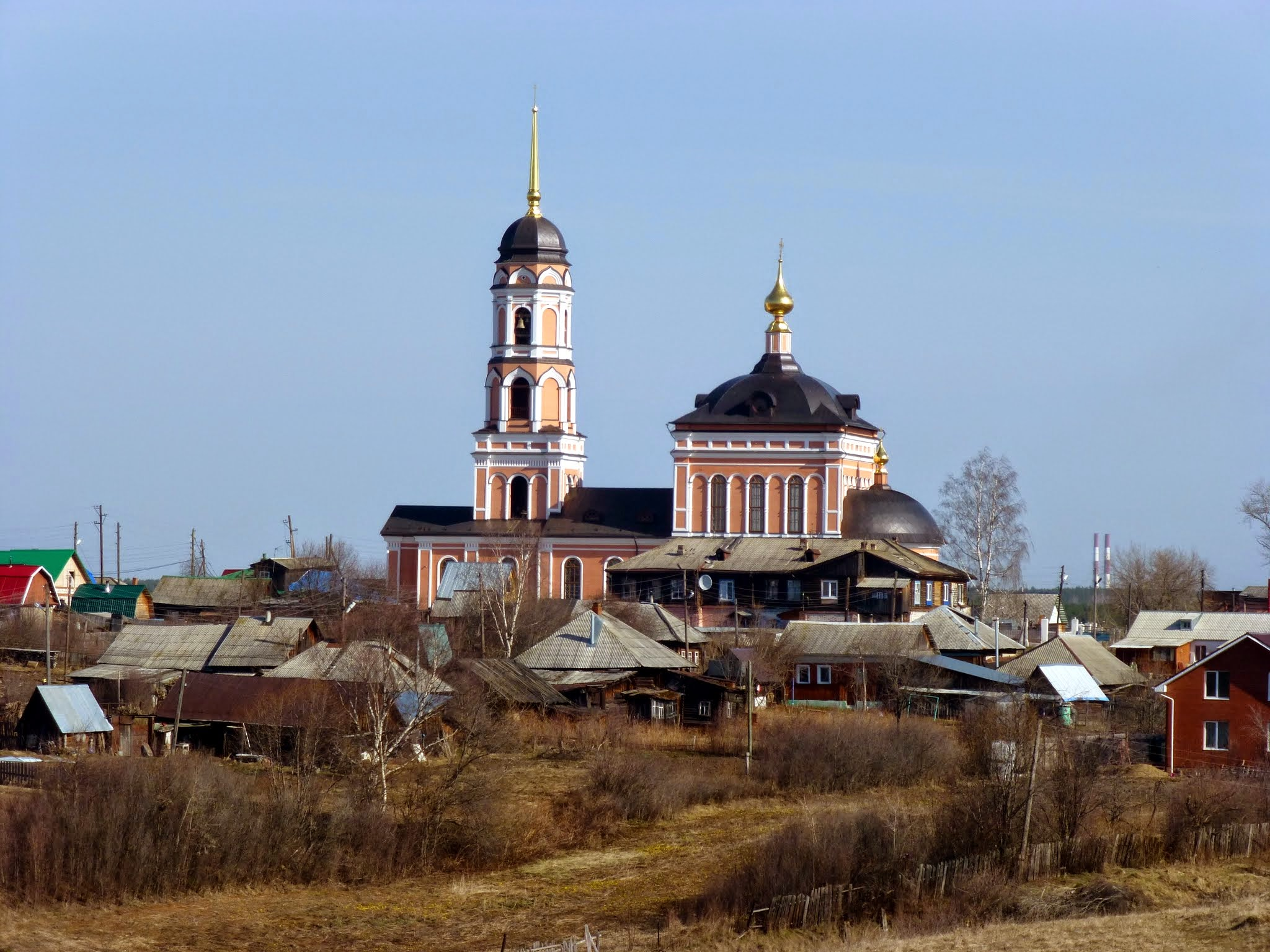
- View of Trinity church

- Location within Perm Krai Location within Russia
- Coordinates: 57°55′N 55°52′E
- Country: Russia
- Region: Perm Krai
- District: Permsky District
- Time zone: UTC+5:00

Nizhniye Mully (Russian: Нижние Муллы) is a rural locality (a selo) in Kultayevskoye Rural Settlement, Permsky District, Perm Krai, Russia. The population was 838 as of 2010. There are 39 streets.

== Geography ==
Nizhniye Mully is located 27 km southwest of Perm (the district's administrative centre) by road. Murashi is the nearest rural locality.
