= Parkovy Avenue =

Coordinates: 57.998236°N 56.155644°E

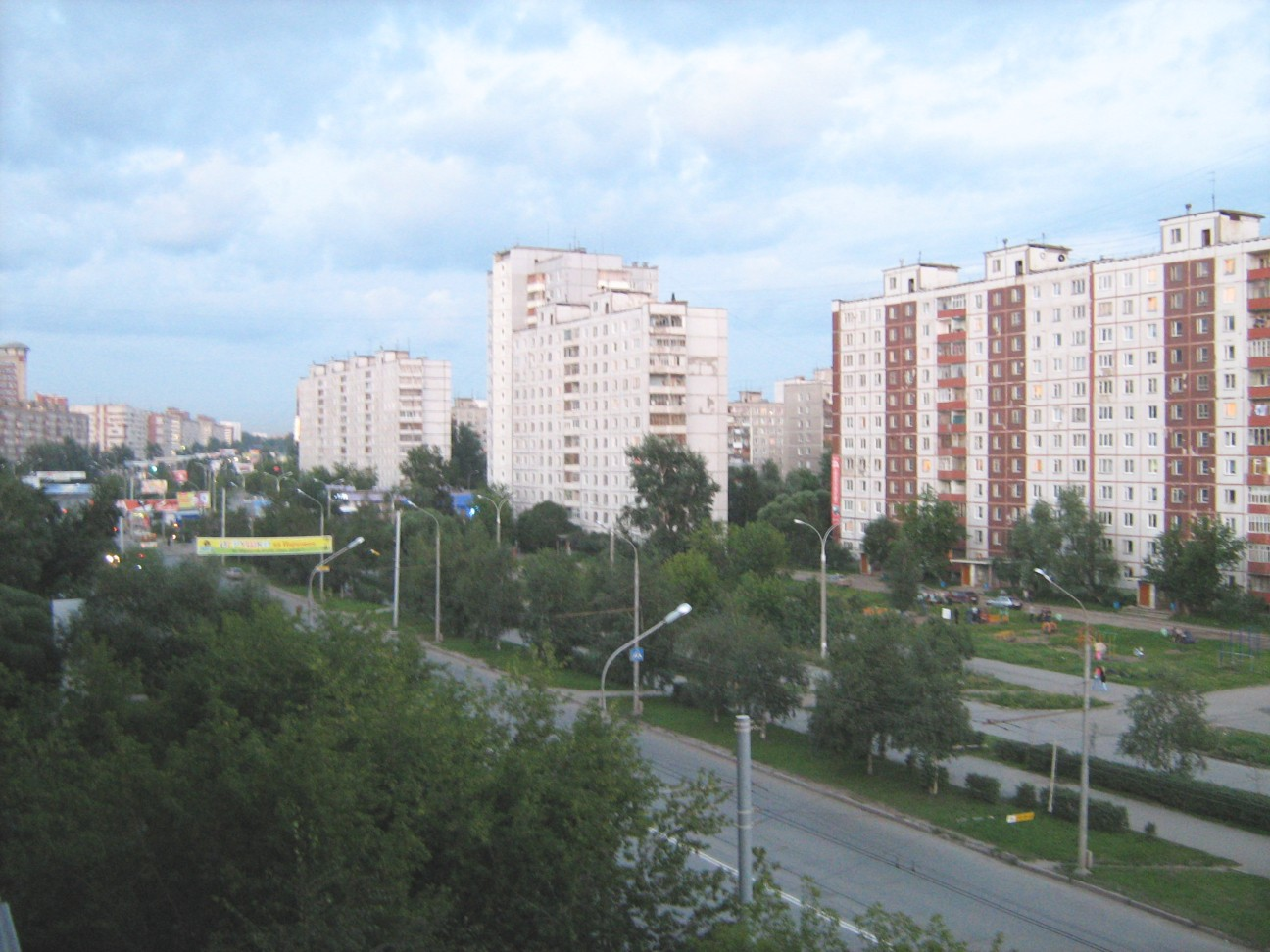
Parkovy Avenue at the evening

Park Avenue ((in Russian): Парковый проспект, "Parkovyy Prospekt") is the name of a street in Dzerzhinsky District in the city of Perm, Russia. The street was formerly named Voroshilov Avenue after Soviet military commander and statesman Kliment Voroshilov.

== Name changes ==
The avenue was originally known as Pereselencheskaya Street; a fragment of this street still exists at the far eastern end of the avenue. Starting in 1975, the street began appearing on maps of Perm as Voroshilov Avenue. In 1988 the local press began to suggest that the street be renamed. The majority of Perm's citizens agreed that the avenue needed a new name, but opinion varied greatly on what the new name should be. Some suggested the street be named after Tukhachevsky or Zhukov in keeping with Russian history, but overall the name "Park Avenue" was the most popular. On July 20, 1989, the Perm city council passed the final decision to rename the street Park Avenue. Houses along the street received new registered addresses.

== Cross streets ==
Park Avenue's western terminus is at the intersection of Kufonina Street. It crosses Rynochnaya Street, Zhelyabova Street, Peschanaya Street, Commissar Pozharskogo Street, Vasiliya Kamenskogo Street, Zoi Kosmodem'yanskoy Street and Gremyachinskaya Street before coming to an end, and continuing as Pereselencheskaya Street.
