= Parkovy, Vladimir Oblast =

Parkovy Парковый
- Selo
- Location within Vladimir Oblast Location within Russia
- Coordinates: 56°38′N 39°35′E
- Country: Russia
- Region: Vladimir Oblast
- District: Yuryev-Polsky District
- Time zone: UTC+3:00

Parkovy (Russian: Парковый) is a rural locality (a selo) in Simskoye Rural Settlement, Yuryev-Polsky District, Vladimir Oblast, Russia. The population was 39 as of 2010.

== Geography ==
Parkovy is located on the Seleksha River, 18 km north of Yuryev-Polsky (the district's administrative centre) by road. Shegodskaya is the nearest rural locality.
