= Industrialny City District, Perm =

Coordinates: 57.9667°N 56.1667°E

Industrialny City District in Perm

Industrialny City District (Russian: Индустриа́льный райо́н) is one of the seven city districts of Perm. Population: 157,575 (2010 census); 160,039 (2002 census); 174,503 (1989 Soviet census).

== History ==
Industrialny City District is the most recently established district of the city. It was established on March 31, 1972, when it was split from Dzerzhinsky City District.

== Geography ==
The city district is situated completely in the left-bank part of Perm and does not touch the Kama River. The Mulyanka River flows through it. A part of the district is occupied by Chernyayevsky Forest.

== Largest streets ==
- Kosmonavtov Highway (Шоссе Космонавтов)
