= Park Row =

Park Row may refer to:

- Park Row (Manhattan), a street in downtown Manhattan, New York
  - Park Row (BMT station), demolished elevated train terminal in Manhattan
  - Park Row Books, an imprint of HarperCollins named after the street
- Park Row, Leeds, a street in the centre of the financial and entertainment districts of Leeds city centre, West Yorkshire
- Park Row (film), a 1952 film by Samuel Fuller

== See also ==
- Park Row Building, 1899 Manhattan skyscraper
