= Park Avenue (Monongahela) =

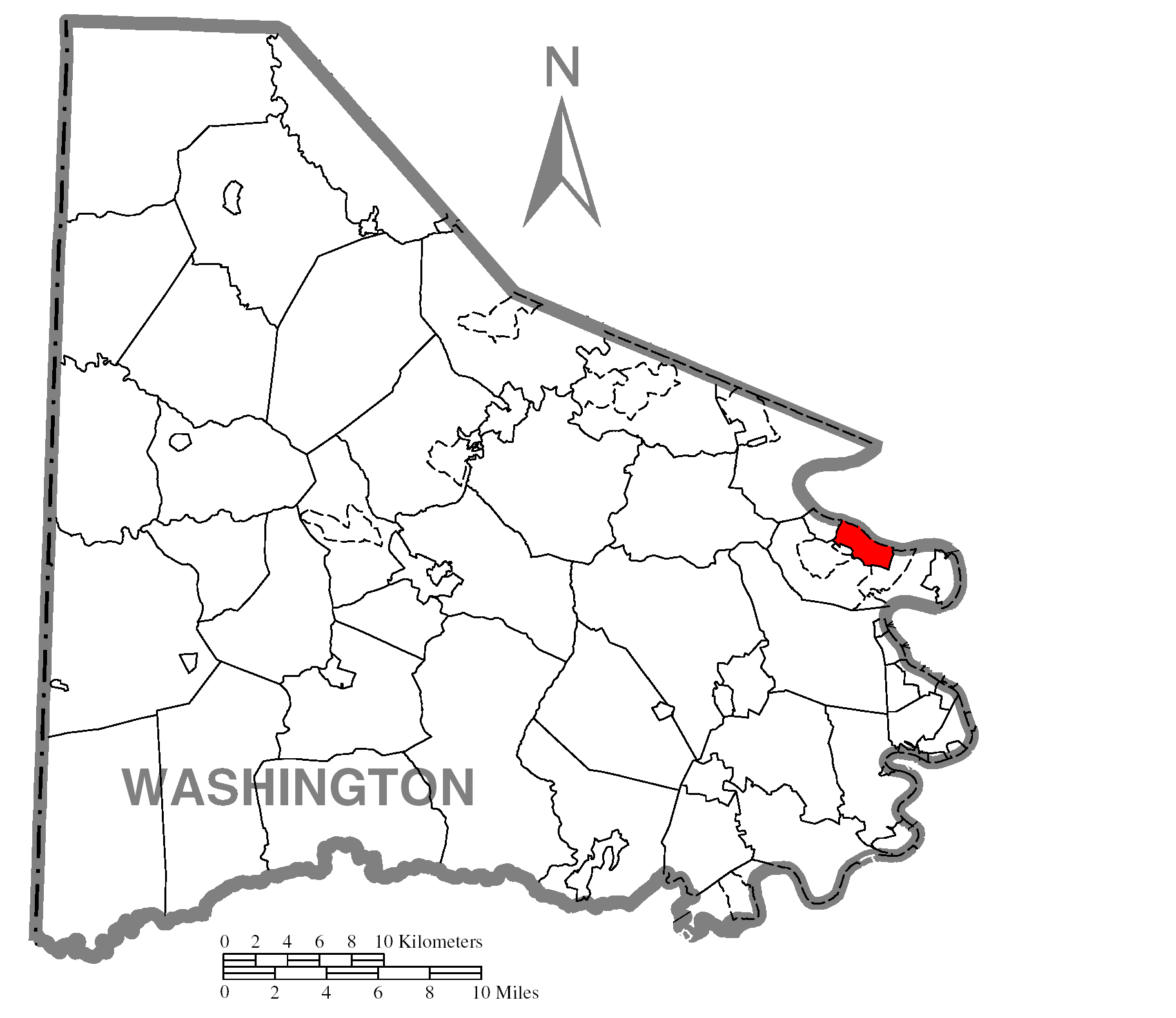
Map of Monongahela, Washington County, Pennsylvania

Park Avenue, located in Monongahela, Pennsylvania, is a street of both historical and cultural relevancy. Several notable figures as well as the Meeting at Whiskey Point have come from this noteworthy location in the small Pittsburgh suburb.

In 2008, a 90-minute documentary about Park Avenue's notable residents, titled One Extraordinary Street was released by Laura M. Magone. The documentary discusses successful people who were once residents on the street.

== Whiskey Point ==
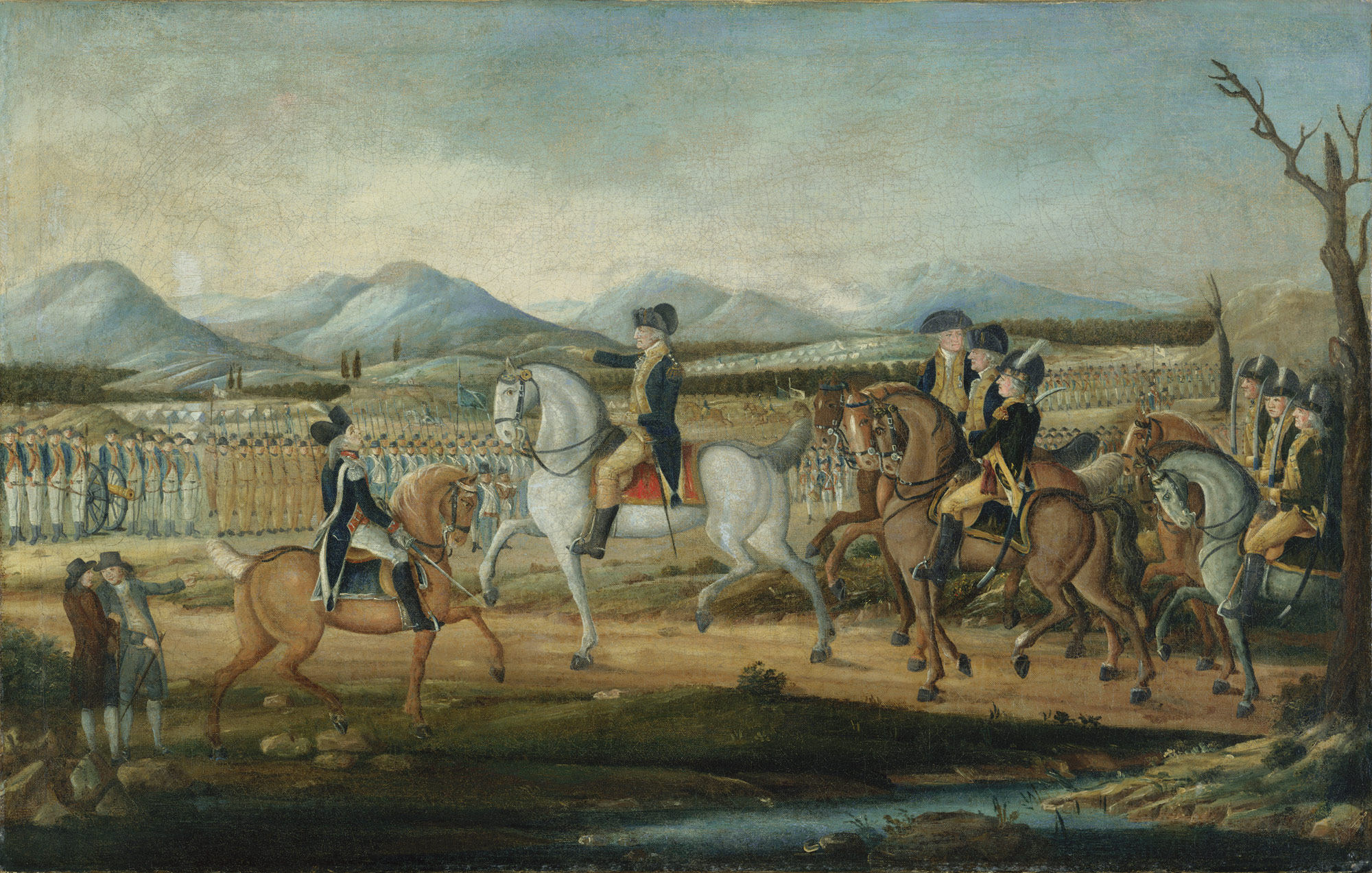
"The painting depicts George Washington and his troops near Fort Cumberland, Maryland, before their march to suppress the Whiskey Rebellion in western Pennsylvania."

On 14 August, during the Whiskey Rebellion, a convention of 226 whiskey rebels from the six counties was held at Parkison's Ferry (now known as Whiskey Point), present-day Monongahela. The convention considered resolutions, which were drafted by Hugh Henry Brackenridge, Albert Gallatin, David Bradford, and an eccentric preacher named Herman Husband, a delegate from Bedford County. Husband, a well-known local figure, was a radical champion of democracy who had taken part in the Regulator movement in North Carolina 25 years earlier. The Parkison's Ferry convention also appointed a committee to meet with the peace commissioners who had been sent west by President Washington. There, Gallatin presented an eloquent speech in favor of peace and against proposals from Bradford to further revolt.

== Notable residents ==
Notable individuals who have lived on Park Avenue include the following.

=== Carl E. Vuono ===
Carl Edward Vuono (born October 18, 1934) is a retired United States Army General who served as the Chief of Staff of the United States Army from 1987 to 1991.

=== Joe Montana ===
Joseph Montana is a retired professional American football quarterback. He played in college for the University of Notre Dame and in the National Football League (NFL) for the San Francisco 49ers and Kansas City Chiefs. Montana maintains a laundry list of records, of which include the first player to win the Super Bowl MVP three times.

=== Fred Cox ===
Frederick Cox is the all-time leading scorer for the Minnesota Vikings and the inventor of the Nerf ball.

=== Other Notable Individuals ===
- James Jimirro – Founder of the Disney Channel
- Dr. Ronald V. Pellegrini – World-renowned cardiothoracic surgeon
- Deirdre Bair – National Book Award Winner
- Ron Necciai – Former pitcher for the Pittsburgh Pirates
- Aldo Bartolotta – President of Mon Valley Foods
