= Park Lane Academy =

Coordinates: 53.6980°N 1.8485°W

Location
- Park Lane; Exley; Halifax, West Yorkshire, HX3 9LG; England

Information
- Type: Academy
- Local authority: Calderdale
- Trust: South Pennine Academies
- Department for Education URN: 143115 Tables
- Ofsted: Reports
- Executive Principal: Kash Rafiq
- Principal: Stuart Hillary
- Gender: Mixed
- Age: 11 to 16
- Enrolment: 457 as of February 2021
- Website: http://www.parklane.org.uk

Park Lane Academy is a non-selective mixed secondary school located in Exley (near Halifax), West Yorkshire, England.

Originally known as Exley County Secondary Modern School, the school was later renamed Park Lane High School, before becoming a foundation school when it was renamed Park Lane Learning Trust. As a foundation school, Park Lane was administered by a trust which included Calderdale Metropolitan Borough Council, The Crossley Heath School, Together Housing Association and the University of Huddersfield. The school relocated to new buildings in 2006. In October 2018 the school converted to academy status and is now sponsored by South Pennine Academies Trust.

Park Lane Academy offers GCSEs and BTECs as programmes of study for pupils.
