= Ordzhonikidzevsky City District, Perm =

Coordinates: 58.1167°N 56.3667°E

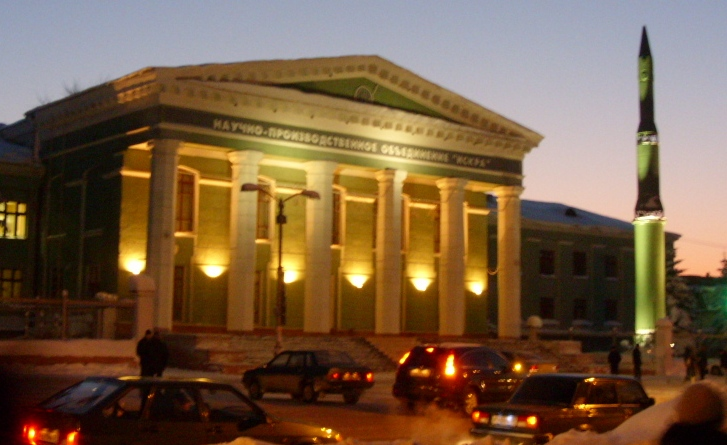
NPO "Iskra" building on Vedeneyeva Street

Ordzhonikidzevsky City District (Russian: Орджоники́дзевский райо́н) is one of the seven city districts of the city of Perm in Perm Krai, Russia, located on both banks of the Kama River. Population: 111,204 (2010 Census); 111,631 (2002 Census); 121,914 (1989 Soviet census).

== History ==
The city district was established on March 16, 1940, when the city borders were expanded.
