= Chernyayevsky Forest =

Forest in the city of Perm, Russia

Coordinates: 57°59′4″N 56°9′8″E

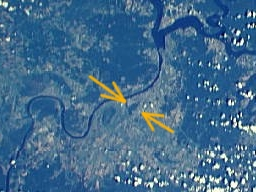
Position of Chernyayevsky Forest on the satellite photo of Perm

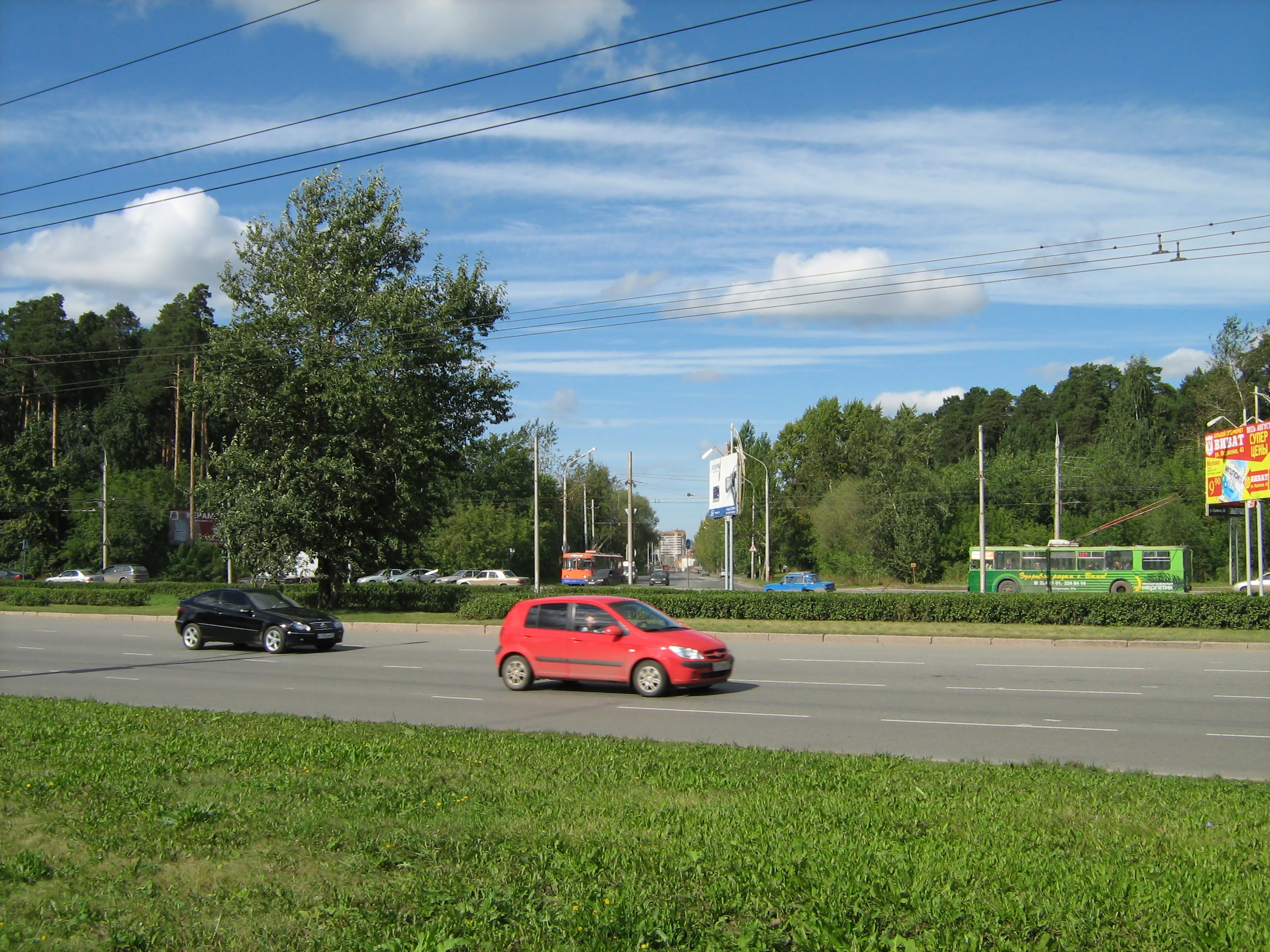
View of Chernyayevsky Forest and Podlesnaya Street from Cosmonauts Highway

Chernyayevsky Forest (Russian: Черня́евский лес) is a forest in the city of Perm, Russia, in Industrialny and Dzerzhinsky city districts. The total area of forest in 2003 was 689.9 ha. The forest is under direction of Municipal Establishment "Perm City Forestry".

== Flora ==
The basic types of trees growing in the forest are Scots Pine (Pinus sylvestris), Siberian Spruce (Picea obovata) and Siberian Fir (Abies sibirica). Birch, Alder and Aspen are also present. There are artificial plantings of trees, which are atypical for the nature of Perm Krai: Siberian crabapple (Malus baccata), Siberian Pear (Pyrus ussuriensis), Manitoba Maple (Acer negundo), Norway Maple (Acer platanoides), Manchurian Cherry (Prunus maackii) and Pin cherry (Prunus pensylvanica), Hungarian Lilac (Syringa josikaea) and others.

There are more than 50 species of plants growing on the glades. Most of them are grassy perennials. There are food, medicinal, fodder and weed plants among them. 14 species of plants are rare and need protection.

== Fauna ==
A quantity of species of birds live in the forest. Squirrels and hares lived there formerly, but today anthropogenic influence have aggravated the condition of vegetation and fauna.

In 2005 Municipal Establishment "Perm City Forestry" put up 80 artificial nests.

== Recreation park "Balatovo" ==
At the territory of forest Recreation park "Balatovo" is situated. It was founded February 1, 1967. Its area is 19 ha.

The place has been going through a lot of renovations. Since 2020, several concrete paved roads with street lights have been installed in the territory. There are points to rent bicycles in summers and skis in winter. There are small sheds for barbecuing. Also, an outdoor space equipped with fitness equipment for the specially abled is there. In 2024-25, a new complex for kids and children opened up in the same territory.

== Anthropogenic pressure ==
The forest park is surrounded by motorways from all sides, which affect it even more than industrial emissions. The whole network of motorways around leads to pollution of the forest park atmosphere with nitrogen dioxide, benzopyrene, formaldehyde, sulphur dioxide, soot. Soil at the border of the forest park is also contaminated, with excess of MPCs for nickel and chromium, although the concentration of metals decreases with distance from the roads.

In 2012-2013, the administration of the Perm planned to use part of the Chernyayevsky forest to house the zoo. Most conservation scientists in Perm Krai have been extremely negative about any construction in this specially protected area. It was noted that so far there has been partial degradation of ecosystems as a result of anthropogenic impact, but it is reversible. However, interference with natural processes in the form of cuttings and the construction of a zoo will lead to irreversible consequences. The Russian Ministry of Natural Resources has also not supported the construction of a zoo in the area.
