= Kirovsky City District, Perm =

Coordinates: 57.998°N 55.904°E

Kirovsky City District Ки́ровский райо́н
- Urban Municipality
- Interactive map of Kirovsky City District

Area
  - Total: 404 km^{2} (156.1 sq mi)

Population (2010)
  - Total: 127,793

Kirovsky district on the map of Perm

Kirovsky (Russian: Ки́ровский райо́н) is the westernmost of the seven city districts that make up the city of Perm in Perm Krai, Russia, located on the right bank of the Kama River. As of the 2010 Census, the population was 127,793, up from 126,960 in 2002, and 138,607 in 1989. It is composed of 10 smaller microdistricts, and has a total land area of 404 square kilometers, or 156.1 square miles. Out of all of the city districts that make up Perm, Kirovsky has the highest percent of land being used for parks, at 75%. It has an industry-based economy. Out of the other six city districts, its only neighbor is Dzerzhinsky.

As of now, the district has Zakamsk as its hub. Zakamsk is growing at a rapid rate and has been home to several small industries.

== History ==
The first permanent settlement in the area was Orborino, which was established in 1614 as a garrison to protect the local nobility's forest estates. The first true village, Zabornaya was founded in the year 1816, and was once again a noble possession. It developed a strong charcoal industry in the 1860s that lasted until the early 1890s. In the following decades, numerous smaller hamlets would appear around the growing town, many eventually becoming microdistricts. Eventfully, in 1930, Zabornaya and a few nearby hamlets were linked to the city of Perm and merged to form the work settlement of Zamask, which was then merged with the remaining rural hamlets on January 18, 1941, to form the modern city district of Kirovsky.
