= Dzerzhinsky City District, Perm =

Coordinates: 58.025°N 56.121°E

Dzerzhinsky City District in Perm

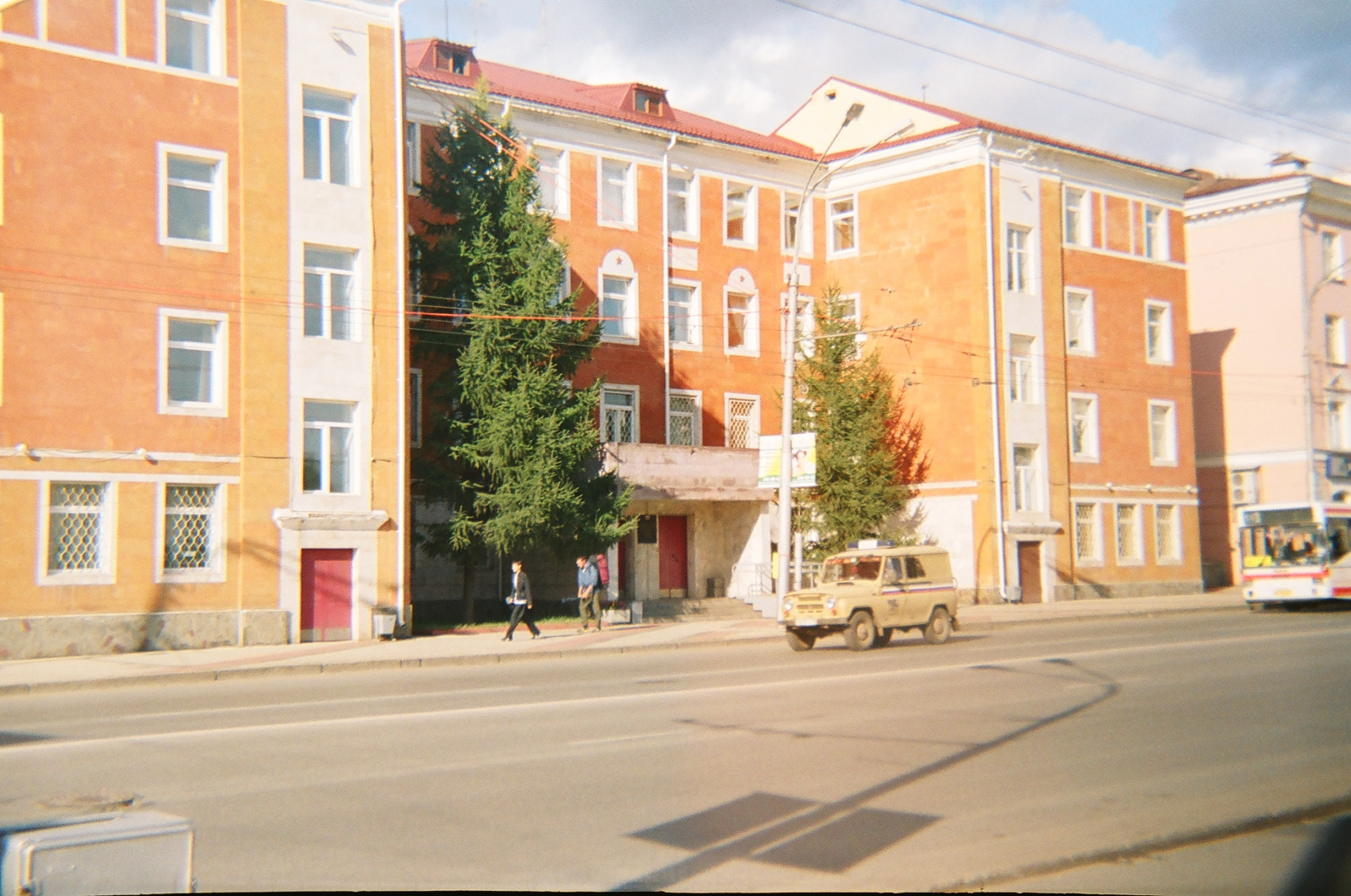
Dzerzhinsky City District Administration building

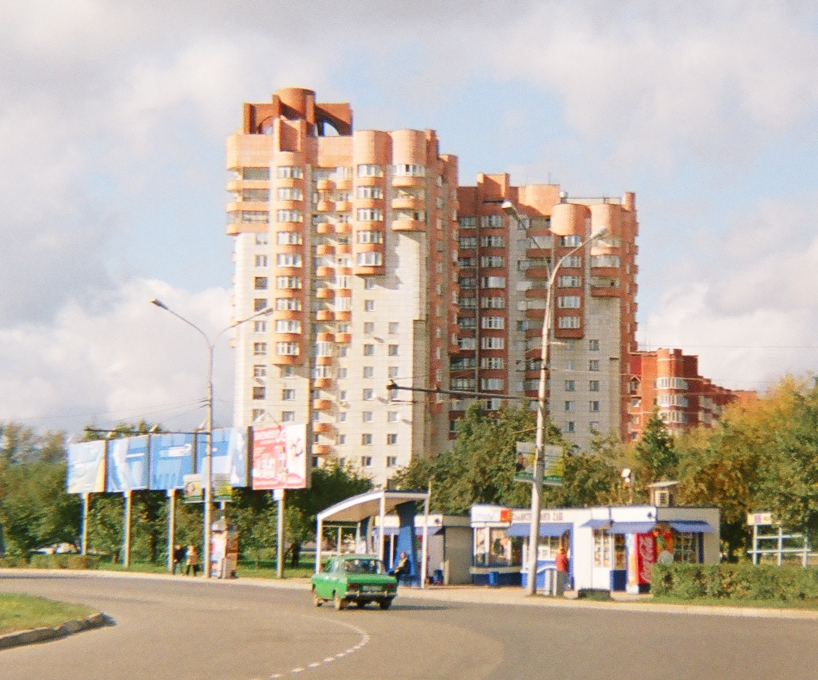
An apartment house, example of the 1990s architecture

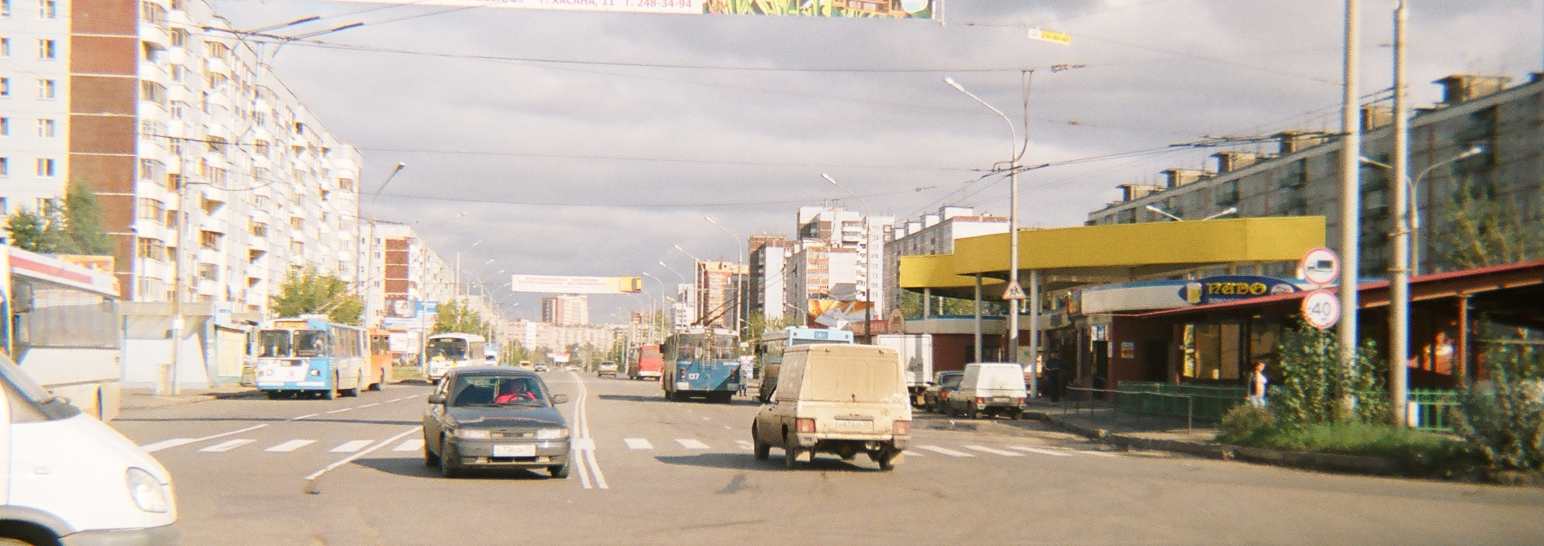
Parkovy Avenue

Dzerzhinsky City District (Russian: Дзержи́нский райо́н) is one of the seven city districts of Perm. Population: 155,632 (2010 Census); 153,403 (2002 Census); 163,012 (1989 Soviet census).

== Name ==
The city district is called after Felix Dzerzhinsky, a Soviet revolutionary and politician.

== Geography ==
The city district is situated on both banks of the Kama River. Two other rivers flowing through it are the Mulyanka and the Danilikha.

== Notable streets ==
Lenina Street, Plekhanova Street, and Parkovy Avenue are the largest streets in the district. Park Avenue was formerly named Voroshilov Avenue until the late 1980s.
