= Permyak (disambiguation) =

Permyak or Permyaks (also Permiak, Permiaks) may refer to:

- Komi-Permyak language
- A subgroup of Komi people
- Resident of Perm, Russia
- Pyotr Subbotin-Permyak (1886–1923), Russian painter
- Yevgeny Permyak, Russian writer, journalist and stage director

== See also ==
- Permyak Salty Ears, urban sculpture in Perm
