= Yegoshikha (disambiguation) =

Yegoshikha was the 17th–18th-century settlement; predecessor of the modern city of Perm, Russia.

Yegoshikha may also refer to:

- Yegoshikha Cemetery, the principal cemetery in the city of Perm, Russia
- Yegoshikha (river), a river in Perm Krai, Russia
