= Prokopy Yelizarov =

Prokopy Kozmich (or Prokophy Kuzmich) Yelizarov (Russian: Прокопий Козьмич (Прокофий Кузьмич) Елизаров; died June 16, 1681) was a Russian statesman of the 17th century, the voivod (governor) of Solikamsk province during the rule of Alexis I. He came from the noble family of Yelizarovs, descended from Yelizar, the son of tatarian prince Yegud, who served Vasili II.

In the winter of 1647—1648, by order of the Novgorod prikaz, Yelizarov searched the Stroganovs' and monasteries' estates for fugitive peasants, and settled them at the Kungurka River, "so that they would live under the Sovereign and not run away anywhere." Elizarov assigned oversight of the settlement construction to his representative Surovtsev and podyachy Vakhtin. The 1,222 people settled at Kungurka were exempted from taxes for three years and received plots of land. These steps attracted the fugitives who were earlier hiding in the wood. Thus the town of Kungur was founded.

Yelizarov is also known for taking a census of the Stroganovs' estates in 1647, by order of Alexis I. He composed the census books which are now of great interest to historians, since they contained the earliest mentions of several cities and towns of Perm Krai. Here is what Yelizarov wrote about the village at the place of the modern town of Lysva:

A village at the mouth of Sylva River with a peasants in it: the homestead of Veneditko, nicknamed Buzhenko, Ivan's son, with his children, Fyedka, Gerasimko and Stepanko, and his brother-in-law Tereshka Anisim's son Veyagin. The homestead of Senka Artemy's son Lodygin with his children, Petrushka and Yakunka, and his stepson Potapko Ivanov.

And this is about the Yegoshikha Village, the predecessor of Perm City:

… settlement at the Kama river and the Yegoshikha river, and in it there are peasant homesteads of Sergeyko Pavel's son Bryukhanov and his sons Klimko and Ivashko.
