= Styx (Perm) =

Coordinates: 58.0168°N 56.2694°E

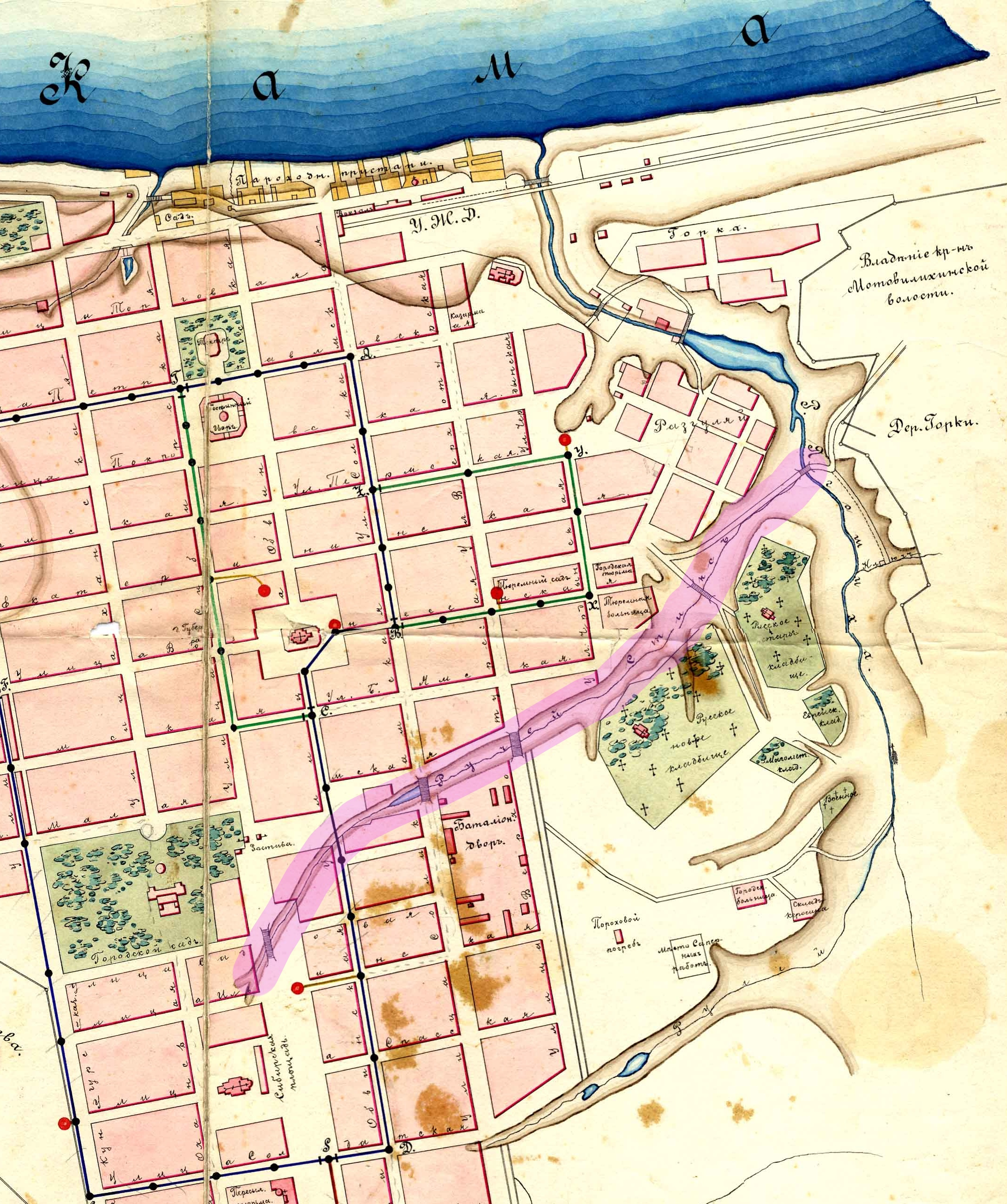
The Styx River in an 1898 map of Perm

The Styx (Russian: Стикс) is a small river in Perm, a left tributary of the Yegoshikha. It is named for the River Styx in Greek mythology.

Seventeen thousand ago there was a Paleolithic settlement Yegoshikha near the mouth of the Styx. It was explored in 2003 by Kama Archaeological Expedition of Perm State University under the leadership of Andrey Fyodorovich Melnichuk. During the excavations several thousand diverse stone tools were found. It was established that settlement inhabitants hunted for deer and horses.

In 1804 by the order of Karl Fyodorovich Moderakh, a governor of Perm Governorate, a moat and earth wall were built in order to drain thaw and rain water from the fields to the Styx and Danilikha rivers.

A part or border of Leninsky City District of Perm goes along the Styx.
