= Legend of Perm Bear =

Sculpture in Perm, Russia

Coordinates: 58.0107°N 56.2377°E

"The Legend of Perm Bear" (Russian: "Легенда о пермском медведе") or "The Walking Bear" (Russian: "Идущий медведь") is a sculpture in Perm, which depicts a walking bear (the symbol depicted on the coat of arms of city). It is situated in the central part of city, at the Lenin Street, in front of Organ Concert Hall and close to the building of Legislative Assembly of Perm Krai. The author of the sculpture is Vladimir Pavlenko, a monumentalist sculptor from Nizhny Tagil, a member of Artists' Union of Russia and UNESCO International Association of Arts. The monument is made with synthetic stone and occupies an area about 3.5 m^{2}. The mass of bear is about 2.5 tonne, the foundation is 1.0 tonne.

The sculpture was opened on September 9, 2006. The ceremony was attended by representatives of sculptors' fund "Yedineniye", human rights representative in Perm Krai, and honored citizens of Perm. Alexey Tyutnev, the director of sculptors' fund "Yedineniye", said,

Everybody could feel the powerful energetics of stone, which is the sculpture made with, just by touching the bear. Having only appeared, Mikhaylo Potapych immediately became a popular person. Children and adults have one's picture taken embracing the bear and riding it. A six-year-old girl Oksana decided to regale the bear and put a chocolate candy onto its head.

In 2007, as the building of Legislative Assembly of Perm Krai was under repair, the sculpture was temporally removed. On June 12, when the improvement of area was finished, it was returned to the former location.
