= Immaculate Conception Church, Perm =

Coordinates: 58.0103°N 56.2583°E

Immaculate Conception Church
- Храм Непорочного Зачатия Пресвятой Девы Марии
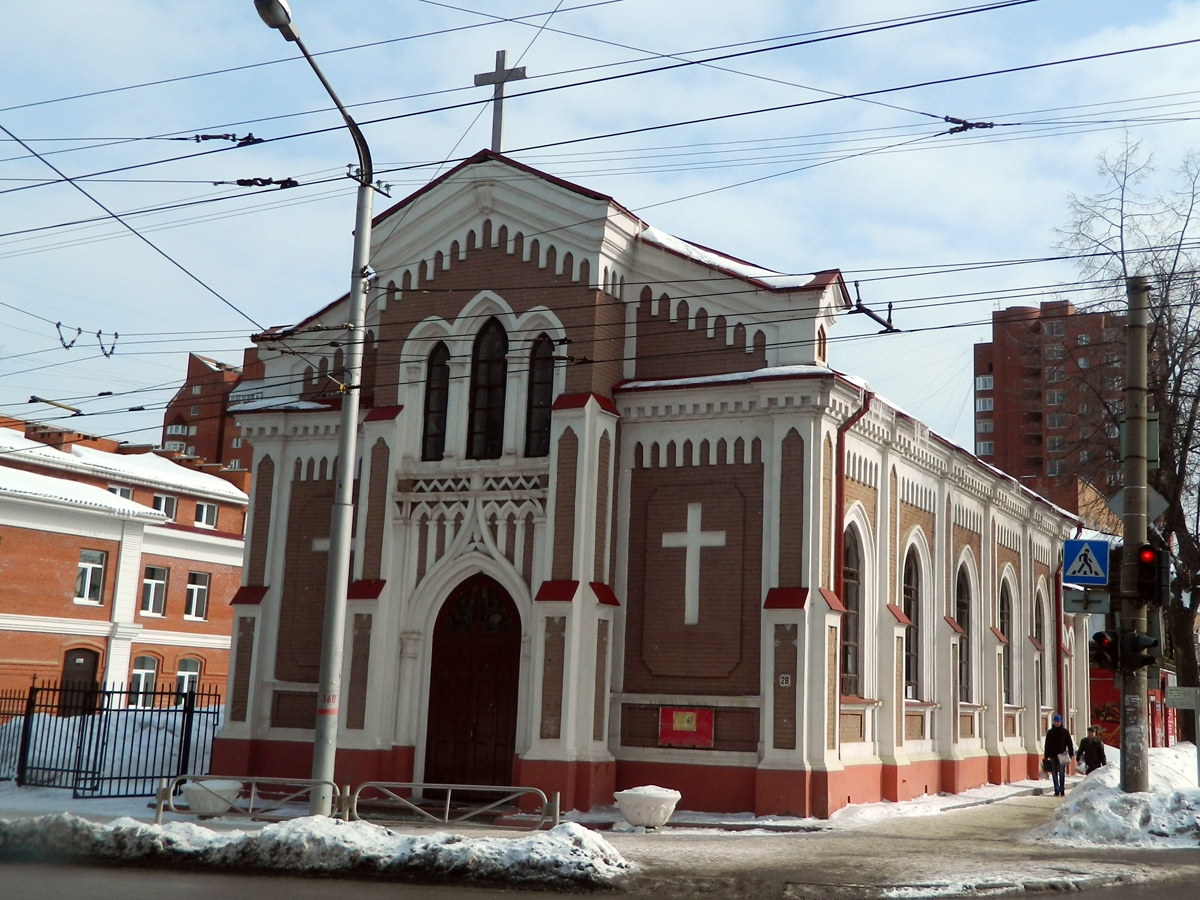
- Immaculate Conception Church
- Location: Perm
- Country: Russia
- Denomination: Roman Catholic Church

The Immaculate Conception Church (Russian: Храм Непорочного Зачатия Пресвятой Девы Марии) is a Catholic church in the city of Perm in the Russian Federation, built in the 1870s. It belongs to the Central Deanery, part of the Archdiocese of the Mother of God in Moscow, and has been headed by Archbishop Paolo Pezzi since 2007.

== History ==
In the years following the formation of the Polish–Lithuanian Commonwealth and the first partition of Poland in the eighteenth century, a significant number of Catholics went to populate the vast lands around the Urals. Many came to Perm in Siberia. Later, after the many Polish uprisings in the nineteenth century, thousands of Poles were sent to Siberia and the Urals.

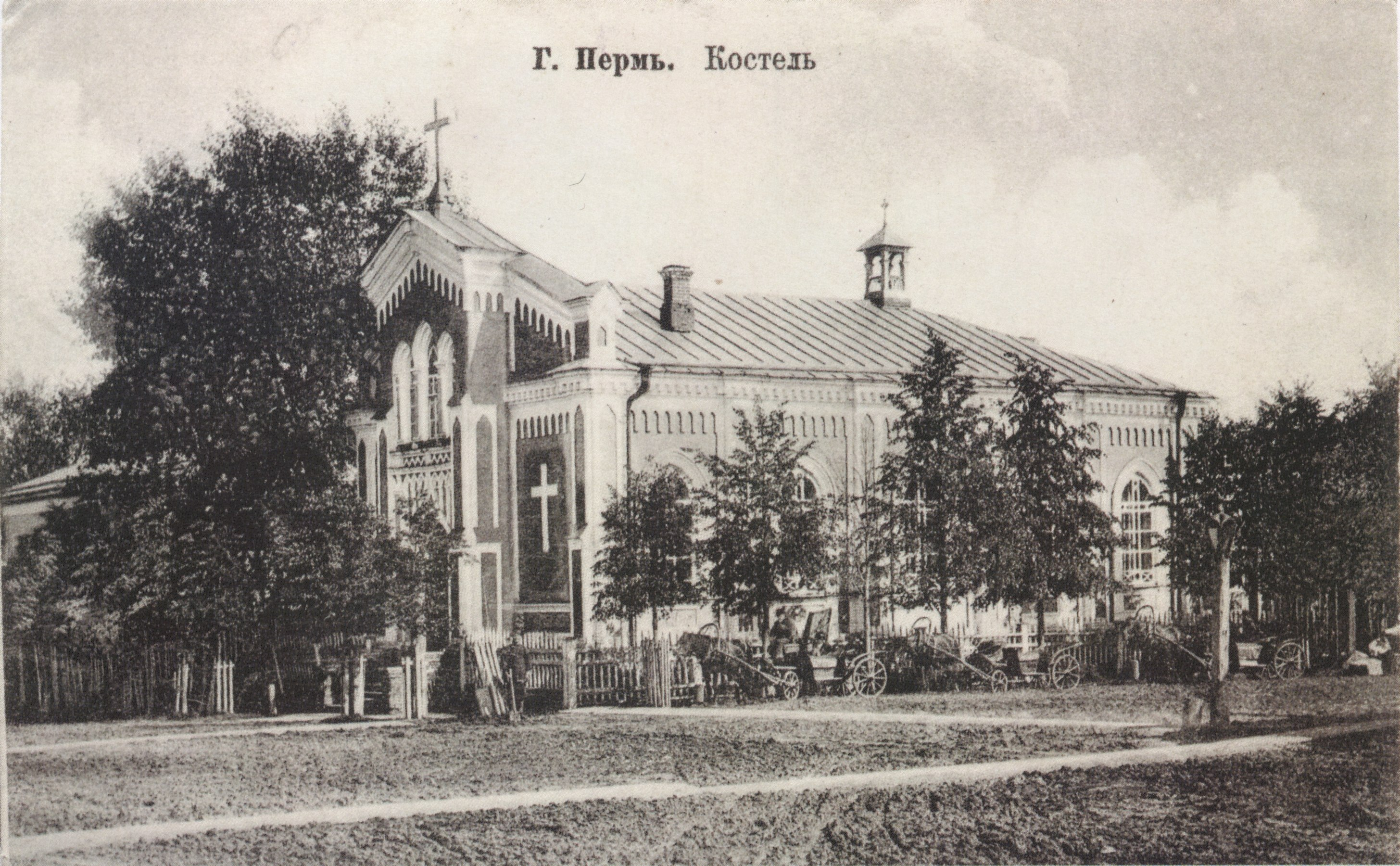
The church on a postcard from the end of the 19th century

Since 1837 there was a small Catholic parish in Perm, which was then a large village. The Catholic community was 1,800 people in 1869. The faithful erected a new church, which was built between 1873 and 1875, in a pseudo-Gothic style.

== See also ==
- Roman Catholicism in Russia
- Immaculate Conception Church
