= At the Bridge Theatre =

Theatre in Perm, Russia

Coordinates: 58.0140°N 56.2297°E

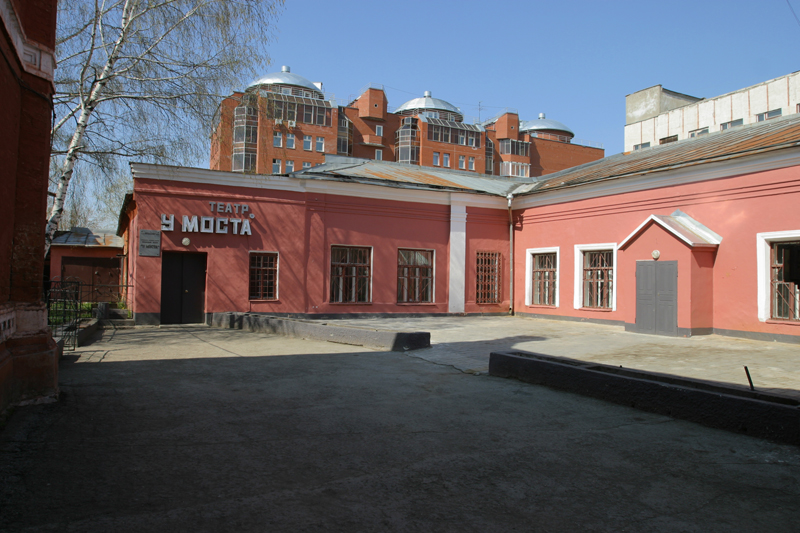
Building of the theatre "U Mosta". Photo from the archive

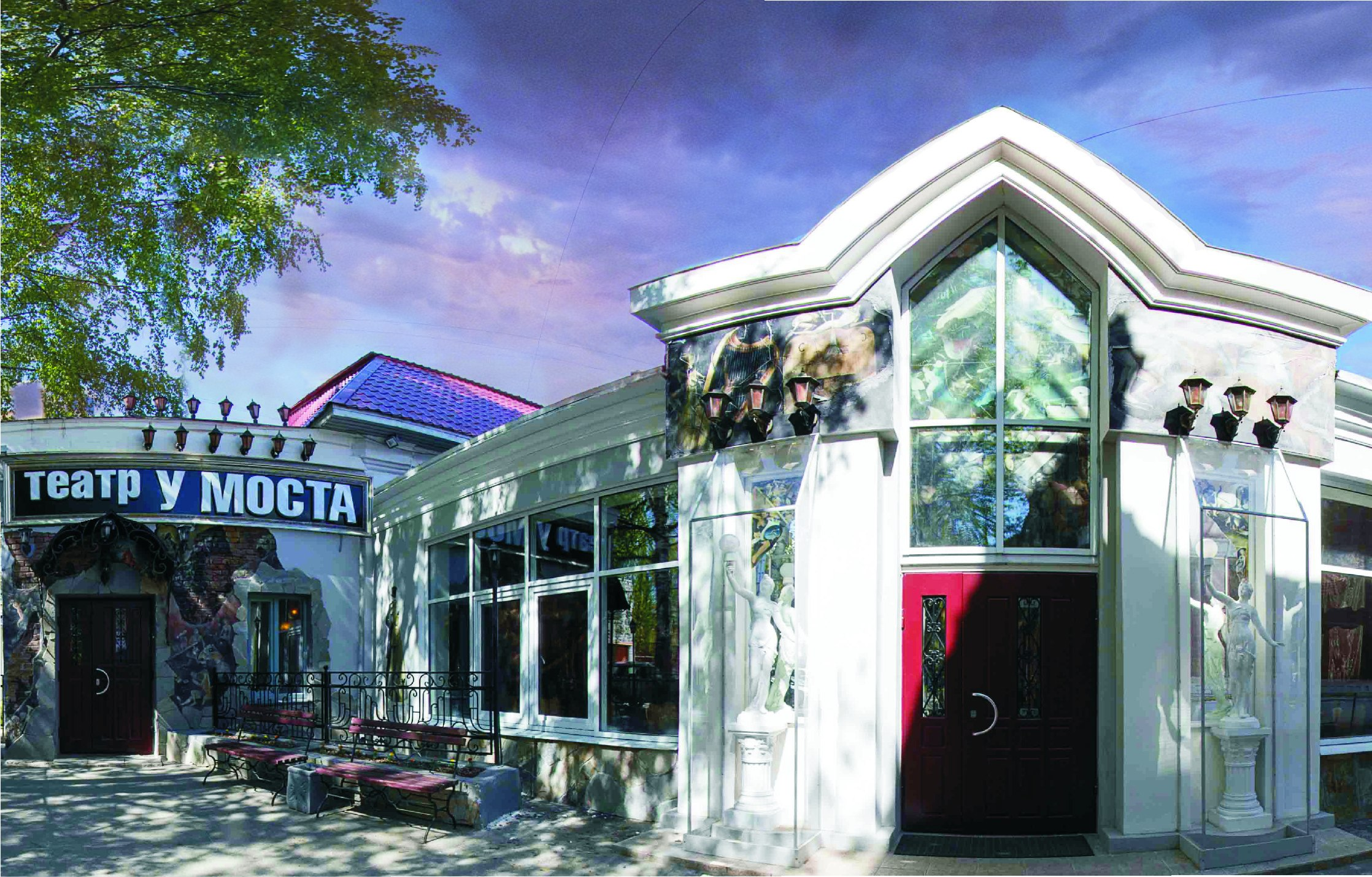
Building of the theatre "U Mosta", 2021

"U Mosta" Theatre (Russian: Театр "У Моста") is an Authorial Theatre in Perm, Russia.

The unique "mystical" theatre, "U Mosta" ("Near the Bridge" or "At the Bridge") has become a legend in the performance of shows based on the works of authors such as Gogol, Bulgakov, Dostoyevsky or Shakespeare (known for their mysticism). Associated with a world-famous troupe, awarded several times and regularly on tour (197 International Festivals and 45 Gand-Prix), the stage enjoys a good reputation. You applaud adaptations by great playwrights or creations.

== History and specificity ==
The theatre was founded by Sergei Fedotov in 1988. First performances took place in the Worker's Culture House of Perm Telephone factory, which was situated next door to the Kama Bridge. Later the name "Near the Bridge" became a symbol of the theatre spirit. A bridge symbolizes connection between real and otherworldly, everyday and mystical, conscious and unconscious.

Sergei Fedotov's artistic method is aimed at developing traditions of Russian psychological theater, enriched by the discoveries of the schools of Mikhail Chekhov and Jerzy Grotovsky. Using this method a director works with psychophysics of the actor, with internal energy and subconscious.

The first set of the theatre was “The Mandate” by Nikolai Erdman. The premiere took place on October 7, the Birthday of N. Erdman.

In 1989 Sergei Fedotov set a symbolic performance “The animal” by M. Gindin and V. Sinakevich.

"U Mosta" won its fame with the performance "Pannochka" (1991) based on the story "Viy" by Nikolai Gogol. Since then it was shown more than 3000 times.

In 1992 it has been formally registered as a theatre and got a new building at 11 Kuibysheva street in Perm, which also is situated next door to the Kama Bridge.

The repertoire contains works of such authors as Nikolai Gogol, Mikhail Bulgakov, Fyodor Dostoevsky, William Shakespeare, Evgeny Shvarts, and Leonid Andreyev. Modern writers such as Martin McDonagh are also represented. "U Mosta" has toured a number of cities of Russia and European countries.

== International Festival of McDonagh ==
In 2014 Segrei Fedotov organized the First International Festival of Martin McDonagh. The Second, the Third and the Forth Festivals took place in 2014, 2016 and 2020. Theatres from Russia, Ireland, Great Britain and Northern Ireland, the Netherlands, Spain, Scotland, Iran, Poland, Serbia, Czech Republic, Montenegro, Germany, Austria, Bosnia and Herzegovina, Georgia, Macedonia, Hungary, Romania, Moldova, Ukraine, Belarus, Kazakhstan, Azerbaijan participated in the Festival.

“U Mosta” is the unique theatre in the world which performs eight plays of Martin McDonagh.

== Capacity ==
The auditorium of the theatre accommodates 200 seats in the Big Hall, 100 seats in the New and the Little halls.

== Literature ==
• Perm from the foundation to the present day. -- Perm: World Book, 2000
