= Eduard Sosnin =

- Эдуард Соснин

Head of Perm
- Incumbent
- Assumed office 28 August 2023
- Preceded by: Aleksei Dyomkin

Personal details
- Born: 27 November 1982 (age 43) Lysva, Soviet Union
- Party: United Russia
- Children: 3

Eduard Olegovich Sosnin (Russian: Эдуард Олегович Соснин; born 27 November 1982) is a Russian politician, Head of Perm of Perm since 28 August 2023.

== Biography ==
Eduard was born on 27 November 1982, in Lysva. He graduated from the Higher School of Economics in the Management program. After graduating, he worked as a product manager in a large wholesale company in Moscow. In 2009, he took the post of CEO of this company. Then he returned to Lysva and ran his own business. He was the commercial director of the Lysva company Mercury, which produced clothes hangers and glass products. In 2018, he won the All-Russian competition "Leaders of Russia". In November 2020, he was appointed Minister of Economic Development and Investment of Perm Krai. On 22 August 2023, at a plenary session of the Perm City Duma, Eduard Sosnin was elected the new head of Perm. On 28 August 2023, the official ceremony of Eduard Sosnin's inauguration as the head of Perm took place.
