= Permyak Salty Ears =

Coordinates: 58.0099°N 56.2396°E

Permyak salty ears
- Interactive map of Permyak salty ears
- Location: Perm, Russia
- Designer: R. S. Ismagilov

Permyak Salty Ears (Russian: Пермяк солёные уши) is a 2006 urban sculpture by Rustam Ismagilov in the city of Perm, Russia. The sculpture consists of two parts - the figure of the photographer, standing with a camera on a tripod, and a round frame with large ears, in which those who wish to pose for a photograph can put their faces. The sculpture is located on the main street of the city of Perm, Komsomol Prospect, near the "Ural" hotel and is located on the "Perm Green Line" - a pedestrian route for tourists.

== Background ==
A "Permyak" is a resident of Perm and "Permyak salty ears" is the traditional nickname for the inhabitants of Perm and the surrounding countryside. The region was well known for salt production and according to legend, the nickname was given to workers who used to carry bags of salt on their shoulders and whose ears became saturated with salt, causing them to increase in size and turn red.

== Reception ==
In 2009, according to the magazine "Russian World", the monument was judged to be "the strangest" in Russia.
