= Yegoshikha =

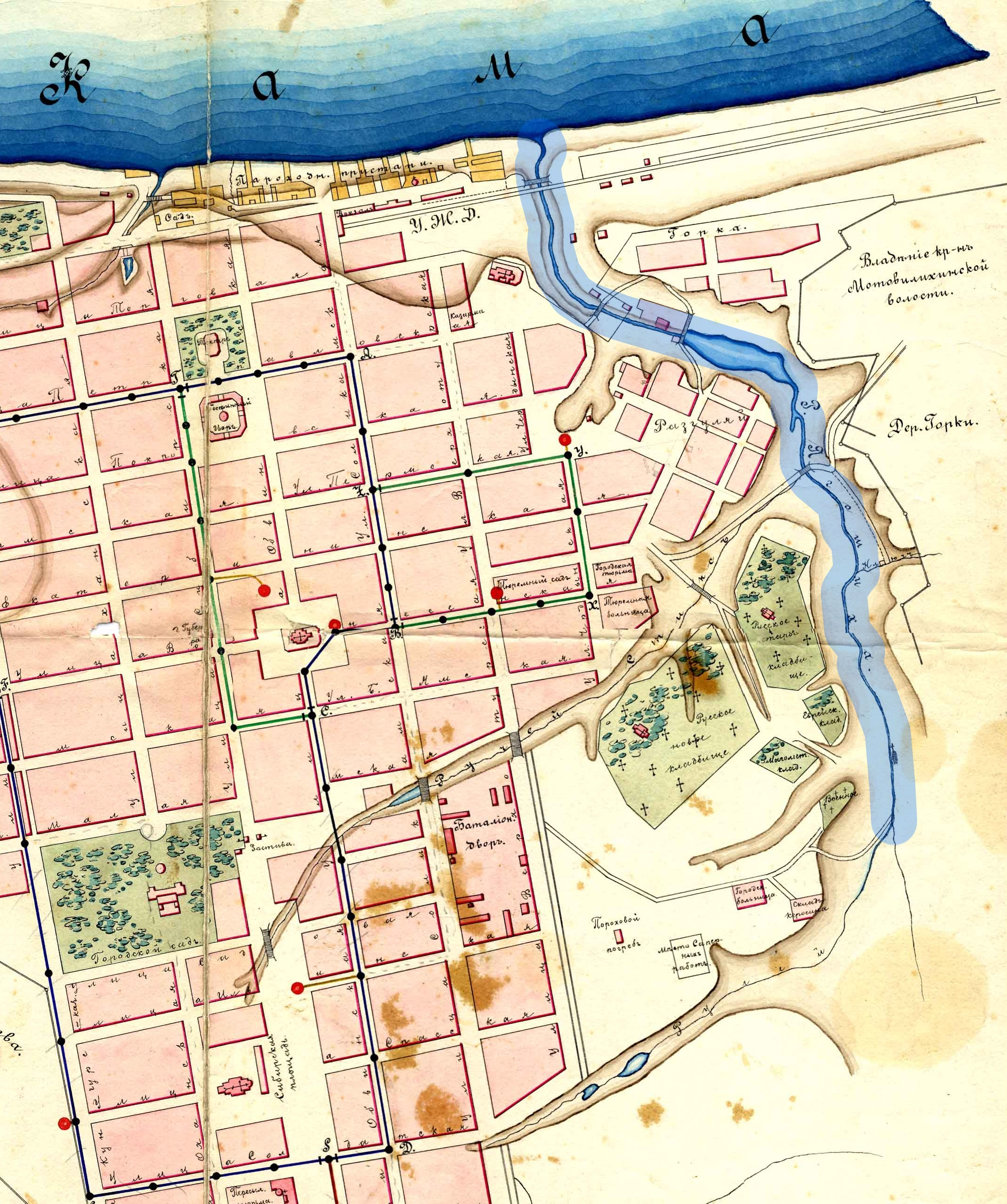
Yegoshikha on the city plan of 1898.

Yegoshikha (Russian: Егоши́ха, IPA: [jɪɡəˈʂɨxə]), formerly Yagoshikha (Russian: Ягоши́ха), was a village on the Yegoshikha River in the 17th–18th centuries. It is famous for its historical significance as the oldest mentioned settlement at the place of the foundation of the city of Perm.

Yegoshikha was founded in 1568. It was first mentioned in the voivod (commander) Prokopy Yelizarov 1647 census book:

…settlement at the Kama River and the Yegoshikha River, and in it there are peasant homesteads of Sergeyko Pavel's son Bryukhanov and his sons Klimko and Ivashko.

In the 1687 census books of Prince Feodor Belsky it was written:

…settlement at the Kama River and the Yegoshikha River with homesteads of Ivashka Verkholantsev, Demka and Yaranko Bryukhanovs, Larka Bryukhanov, and Ivashko Bryukhanov.

In 1692, this settlement was already mentioned as the village of Yegoshikha. The village was also sometimes called Bryukhanovo (Брюха́ново) for the family name of its first residents.

In 1723, after the copper deposit was discovered there, Yegoshikha Copper Factory was founded at the bank of Yegoshikha by Vasily Tatishchev, the chief manager of the Ural factories. In 1781, the workers' settlement was reorganized as the city of Perm by the decree of Catherine II.
