= Perm, Russia =

City in Perm Krai, Russia

Perm Пермь Перем (Komi-Permyak)
- City
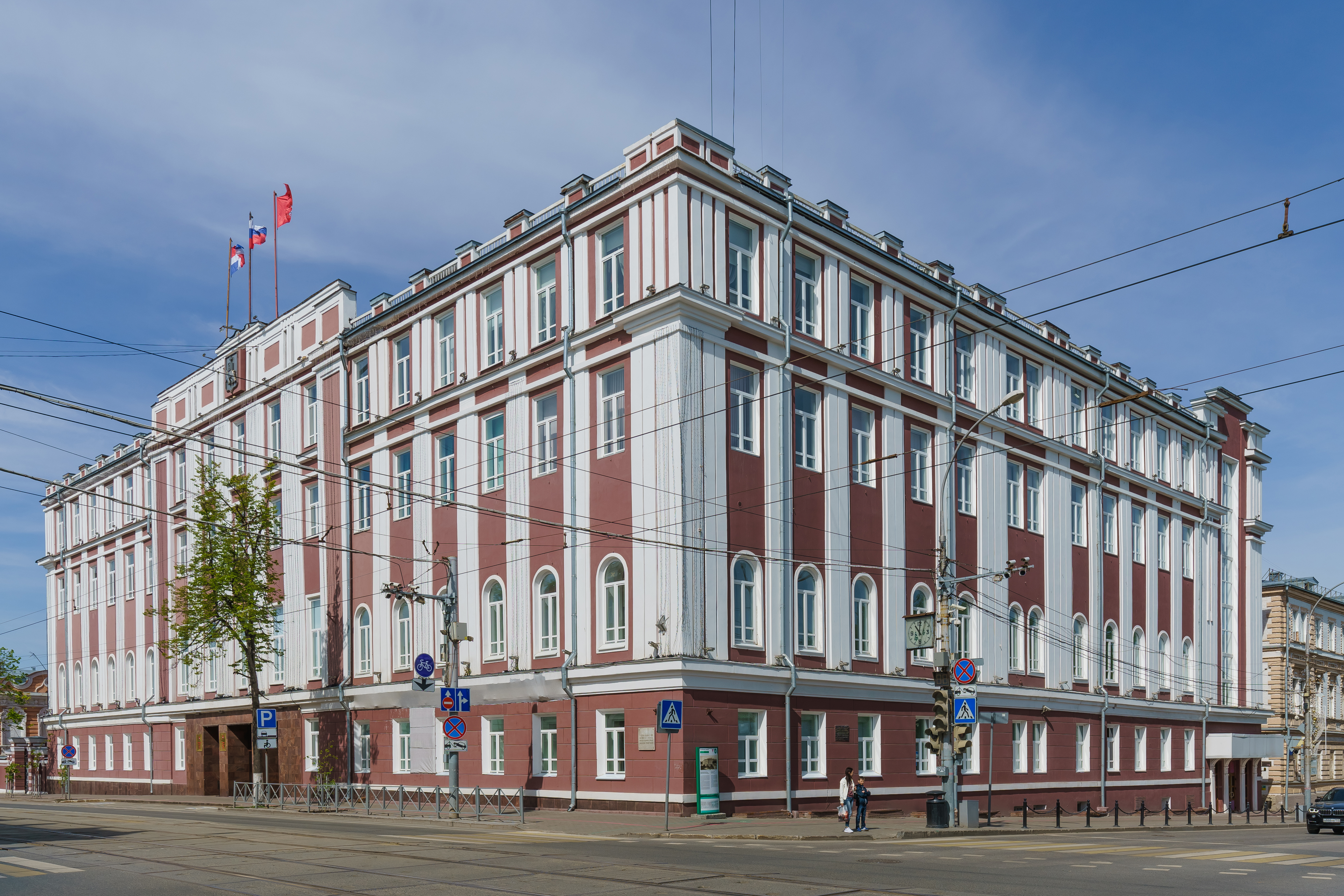
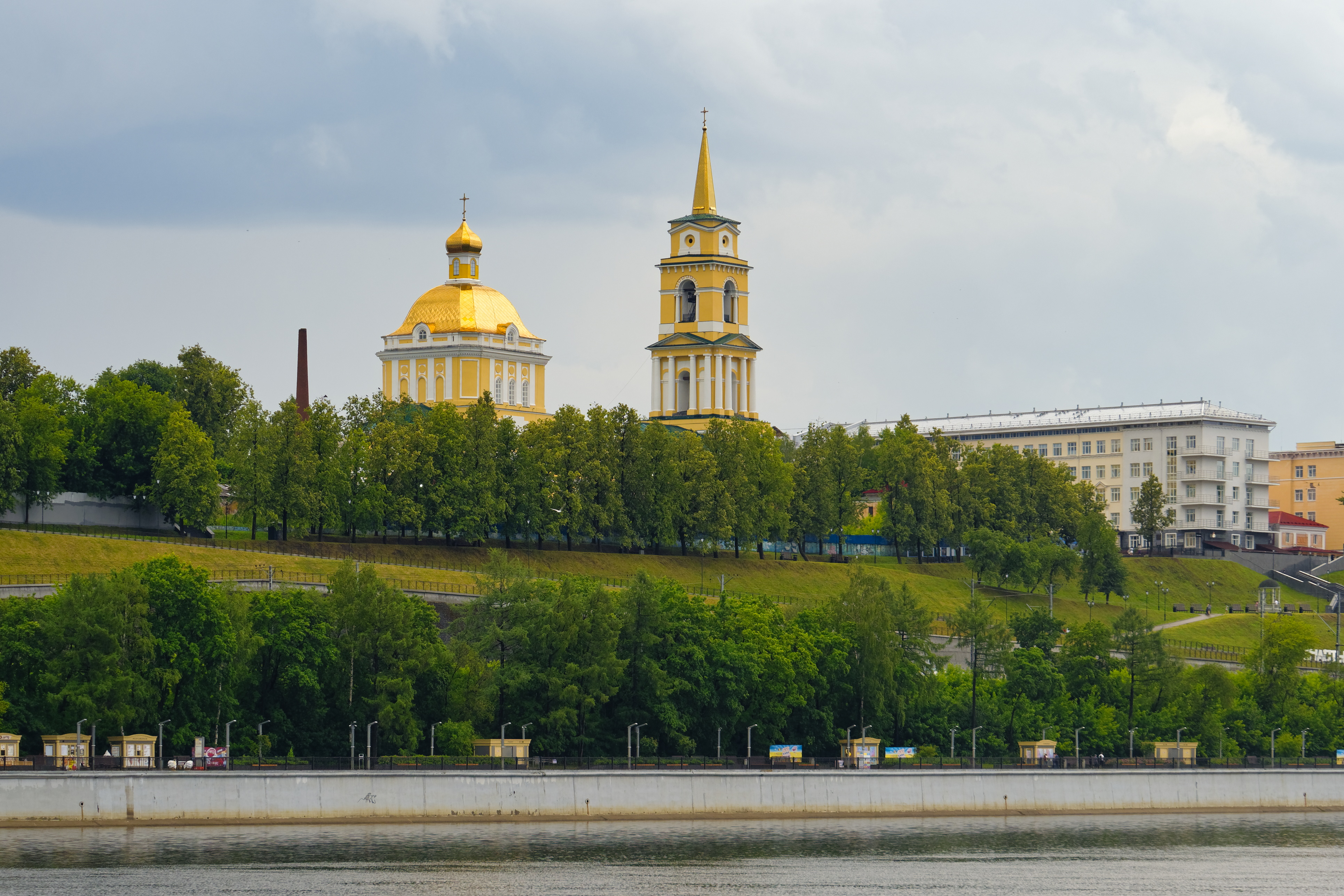
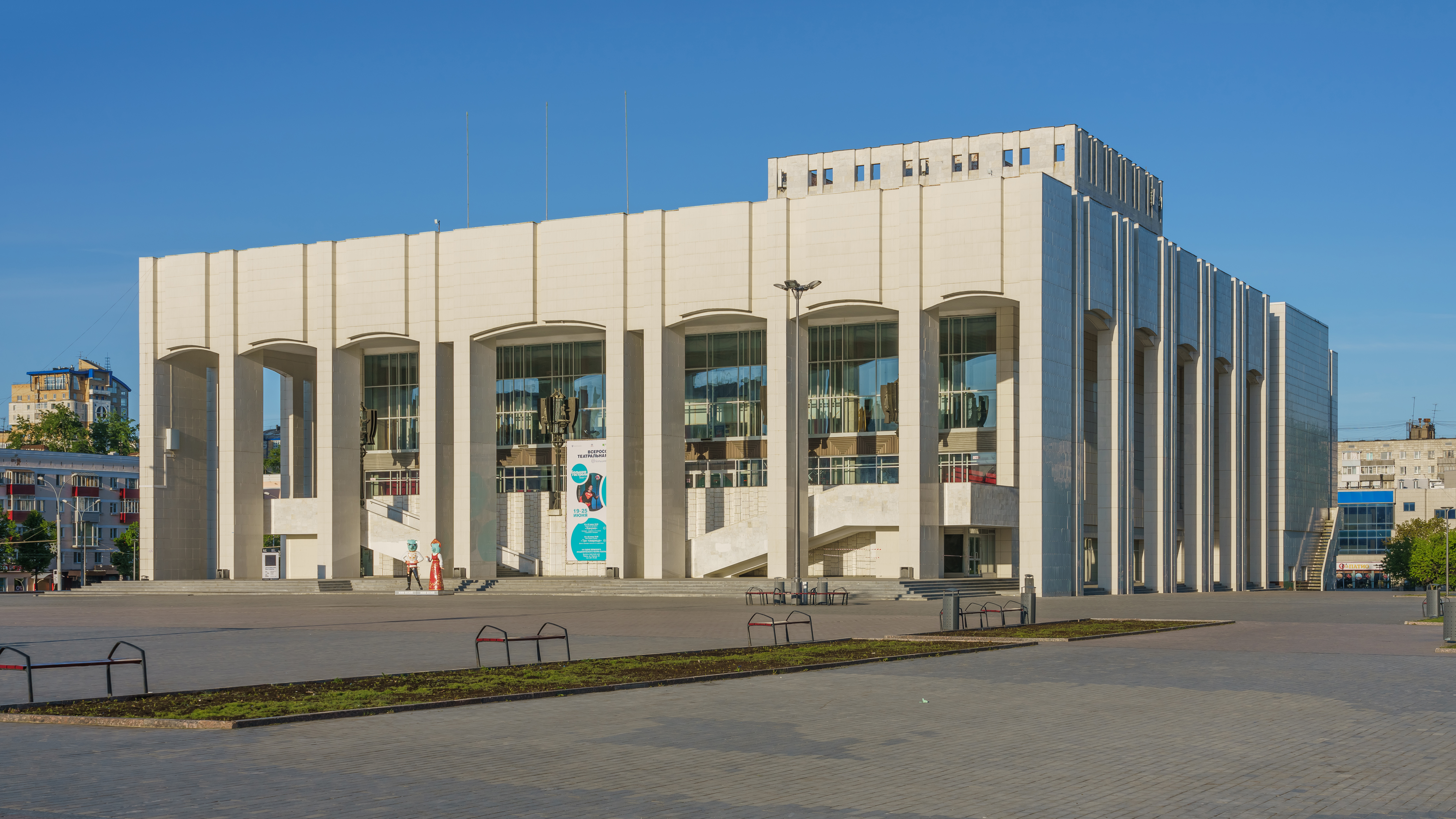
- Perm Opera and Ballet Theatre City Hall Kama River and Art Gallery Church of the Ascension Meshkov house Perm Academic Theatre

- Flag Coat of arms
- Interactive map of Perm
- Location of Perm Perm (European Russia) Perm (Europe)
- Coordinates: 58°00′N 56°19′E
- Country: Russia
- Federal subject: Perm Krai
- Founded: May 15, 1723
- City status since: October 29, 1781

Government
  - Body: City Duma
  - Mayor: Eduard Sosnin

Area
  - Total: 799.68 km^{2} (308.76 sq mi)
- Elevation: 171 m (561 ft)

Population (2010 Census)
  - Total: 991,162
  - Estimate (2025): 1,084,000 (+9.4%)
  - Rank: 13th in 2010
  - Density: 1,239.4/km^{2} (3,210.2/sq mi)

Administrative status
  - Subordinated to: city of krai significance of Perm
  - Capital of: Perm Krai, Permsky District

Municipal status
  - Urban okrug: Perm Urban Okrug
  - Capital of: Perm Urban Okrug, Permsky Municipal District
- Time zone: UTC+5 (MSK+2)
- Postal code: 614xxx
- Dialing code: +7 342
- OKTMO ID: 57701000001
- City Day: June 12
- Website: www.gorodperm.ru

Perm (Note: Russian: Пермь, IPA: [pʲermʲ], IPA: [pʲerʲmʲ]; Komi-Permyak: Перем; Komi: Перым), originally known as Yagoshikha (Ягошиха; 1723–1781) and briefly as Molotov (Молотов; 1940–1957), is the administrative centre of Perm Krai in the European part of Russia. It sits on the banks of the Kama River near the Ural Mountains, covering an area of 799.68 square kilometres (308.76 square miles). With over one million residents Perm is the 15th-largest city in Russia and the 5th-largest in the Volga Federal District.

== History ==
Perm is located in the old Permiak area. Perm was first mentioned as the village of Yagoshikha (Ягошиха) in 1647; however, the history of the modern city of Perm starts with the development of the Ural region by Tsar Peter the Great. Vasily Tatishchev, appointed by the Tsar as a chief manager of Ural factories, founded Perm together with another major centre of the Ural region, Yekaterinburg.

Modern Perm remains a major railway hub and one of the chief industrial centers of the Urals region. The city's diversified metallurgical and engineering industries produce equipment and machine tools for the petroleum and coal industries, as well as agricultural machinery. A major petroleum refinery uses oil transported by pipeline from the West Siberian oilfields, and the city's large chemical industry makes fertilizers and dyes. The city's institutions of higher education include Perm State University, founded in 1916.

Perm grew considerably as industrialization proceeded in the Urals during the Soviet period, and in 1940 was named Molotov in honour of Vyacheslav Molotov. In 1957 the city was returned to its historical name.

=== Etymology ===
The name Perm is of Uralic etymology (Komi-Permyak: Перем, Perem; Komi: Перым, Perym). Komi is a member of the Permic branch of the Uralic languages, which is also named for Perm. In Finnish and Vepsian perämaa means "far-away land"; similarly, in Hungarian perem means "edge" or "verge". The geologic period of the Permian takes its name from the toponym.

=== Pre-industrial development ===
In 1723, a copper-smelting works was founded at the village of Yagoshikha. In 1781 it was granted city status and renamed Perm. Perm's position on the navigable Kama River, leading to the Volga, and on the Siberian Route across the Ural Mountains, helped it become an important trade and manufacturing centre. It also lay along the Trans-Siberian Railway.

Perm was located on the route to Siberia and served either as a stopover or a final destination for many exiles under Tsarist and Soviet rule. According to Mikhail Speransky, in 1813, almost the entire population of Perm consisted of exiles. Many Polish insurgents of the November Uprising were exiled in Perm in the 1830s.

Perm was a city where Poles were allowed to settle after serving their sentences, as they were not permitted to return to Polish territory. Poles established a Catholic chapel in the 1830s, built a Catholic church in 1875, which also served Lithuanians and other nationalities, founded a Poverty Relief Society in 1897, and helped establish a local museum and theatre.

The city was devastated by a fire in 1842 and was subsequently rebuilt. Perm became a major trade and industrial centre with a population of more than 20,000 people in the 1860s, with several metallurgy, paper, and steamboat producing factories, including one owned by a British entrepreneur. In 1870, an opera theatre was opened in the city, and in 1871 the first phosphoric factory in Russia was built. In the 1880s, the city had over 20 industrial plants and over 60 craft workshops. According to the 1897 census, the largest minorities were Tatars (2.8%), Jews (1.8%) and Poles (1.6%). Apart from Orthodox and Catholic churches, the city also had a Lutheran church, an Old Believers church and a synagogue. In 1916, Perm State University—a major educational institution in modern Russia—was opened.

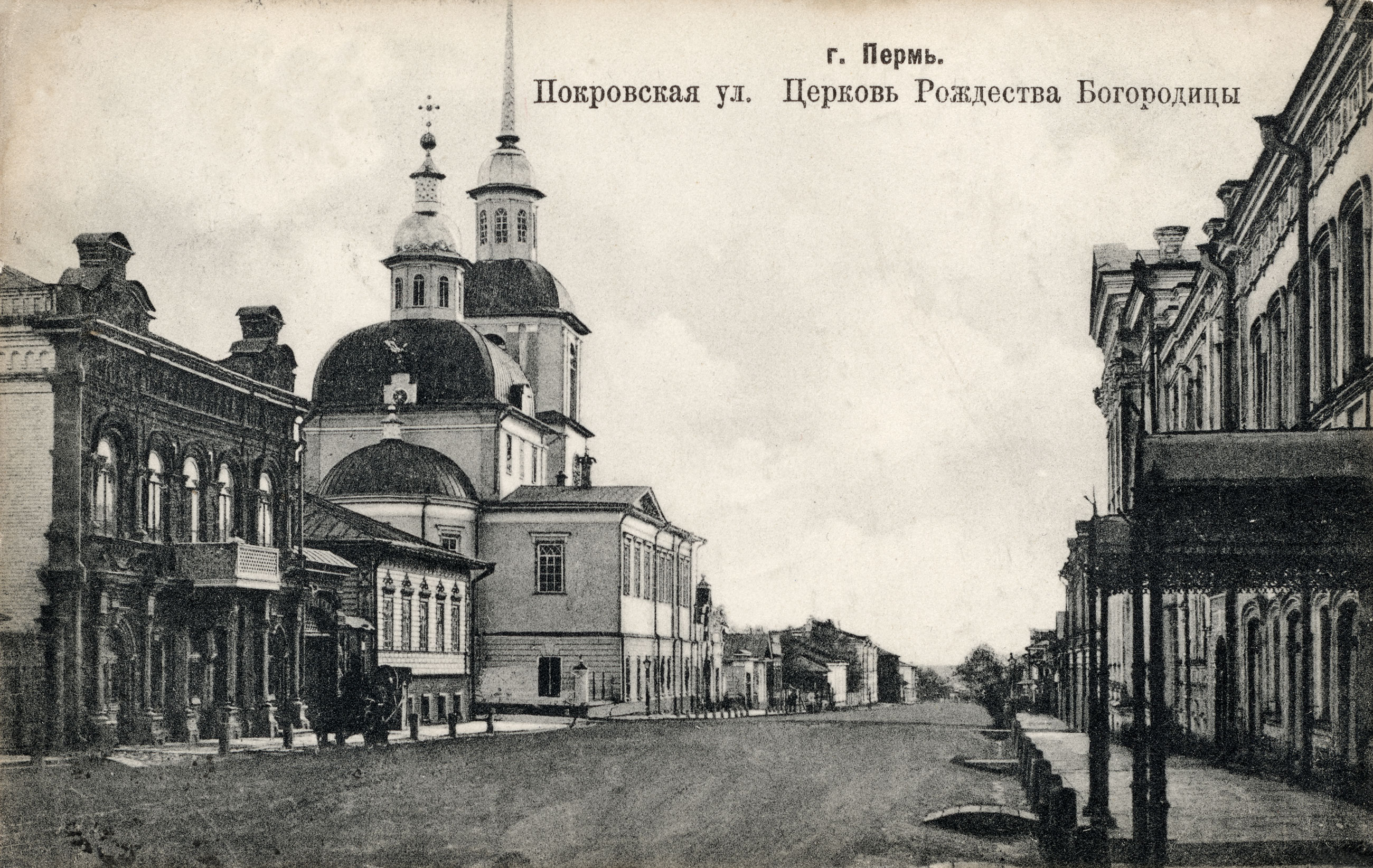
Pokrovskaya Street (nowadays Lenin street) in central Perm around 1910

After the outbreak of the Russian Civil War, Perm became a prime target for both sides because of its munitions factories. It was heavily rumored from July–September 1918 that the Tsarina Alexandra Feodorovna and her four daughters were imprisoned at the perception and Berezine buildings. According to the file on the Tsar, the Grand Duchess Anastasia would have attempted to flee. On 25 December 1918, the Siberian White Army under Anatoly Pepelyayev (who acknowledged the authority of the Omsk Government of Aleksandr Kolchak), took Perm. On 1 July 1919, the city was retaken by the Red Army.

Early color photographs by Sergey Prokudin-Gorsky, taken in 1910

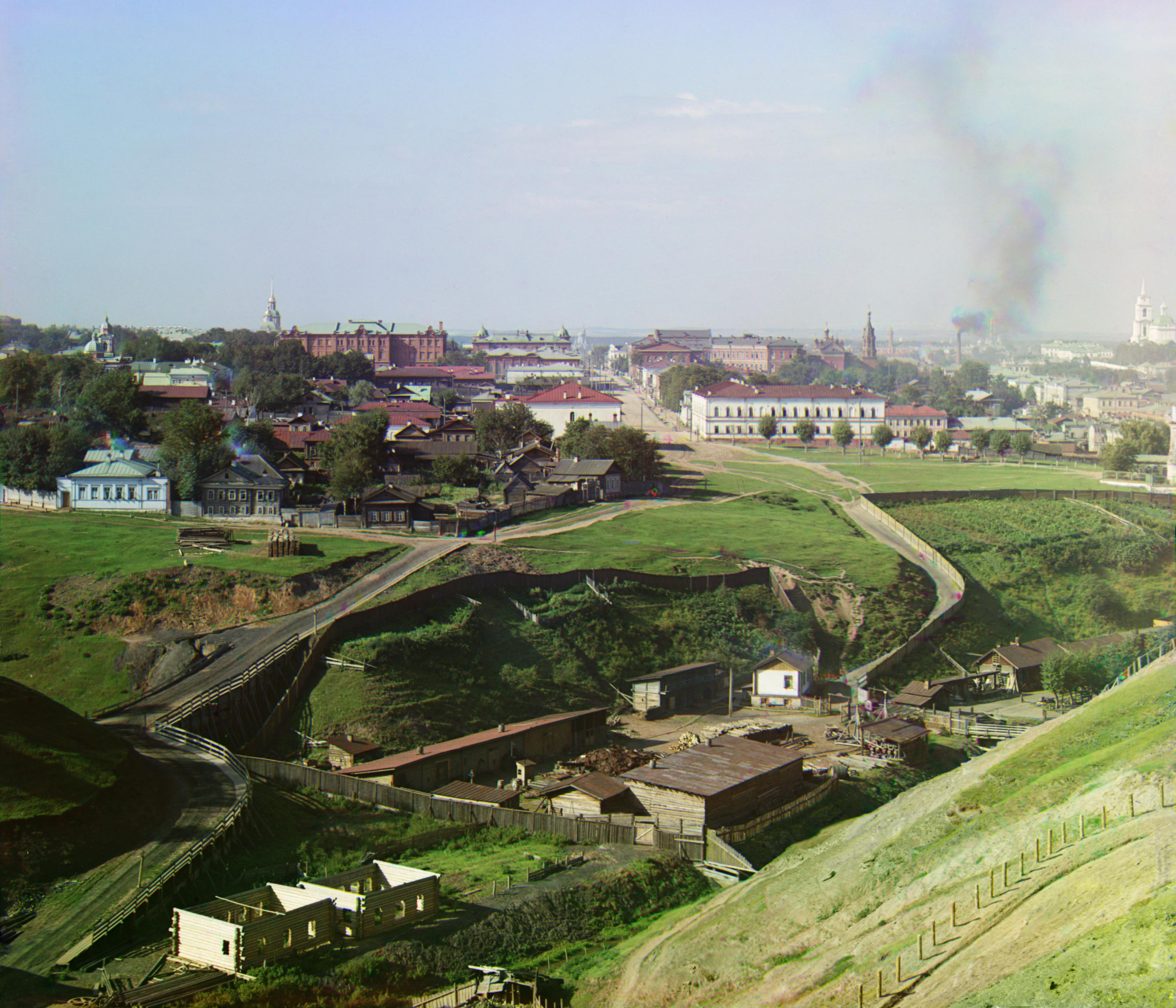
General view of Perm

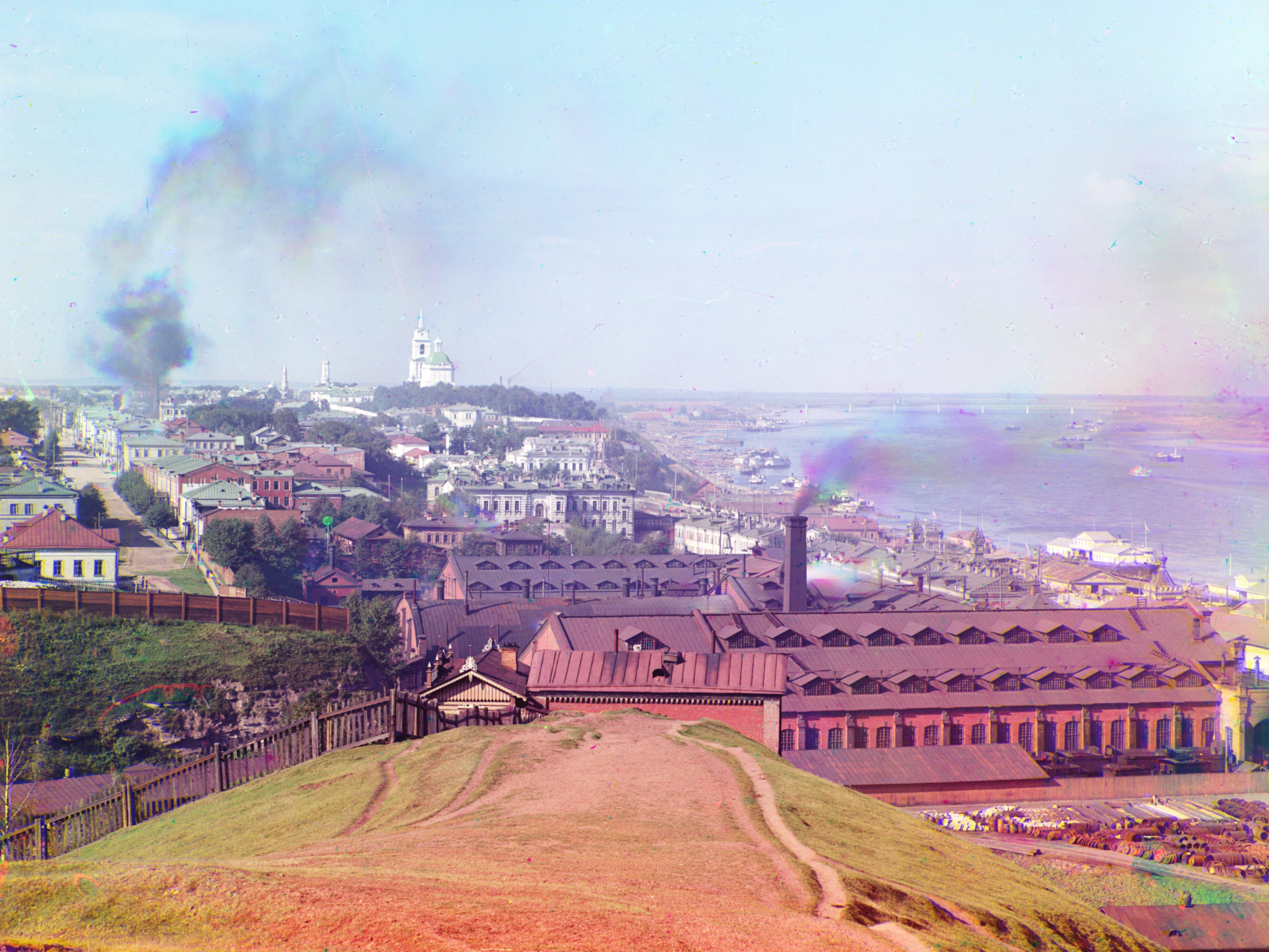
General view of Perm from Gorodskiye Gorki

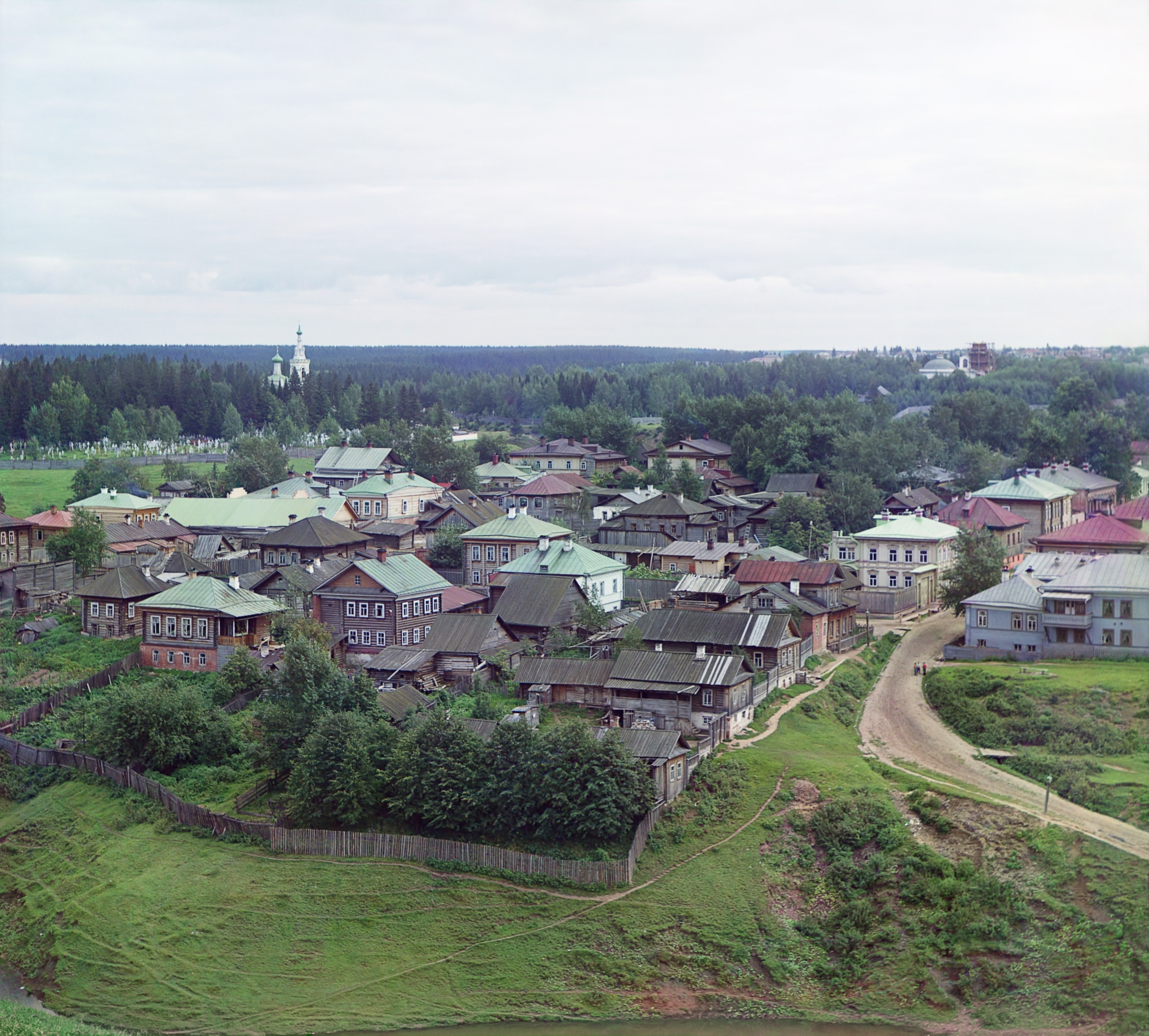
Razgulyay, outskirts of Perm

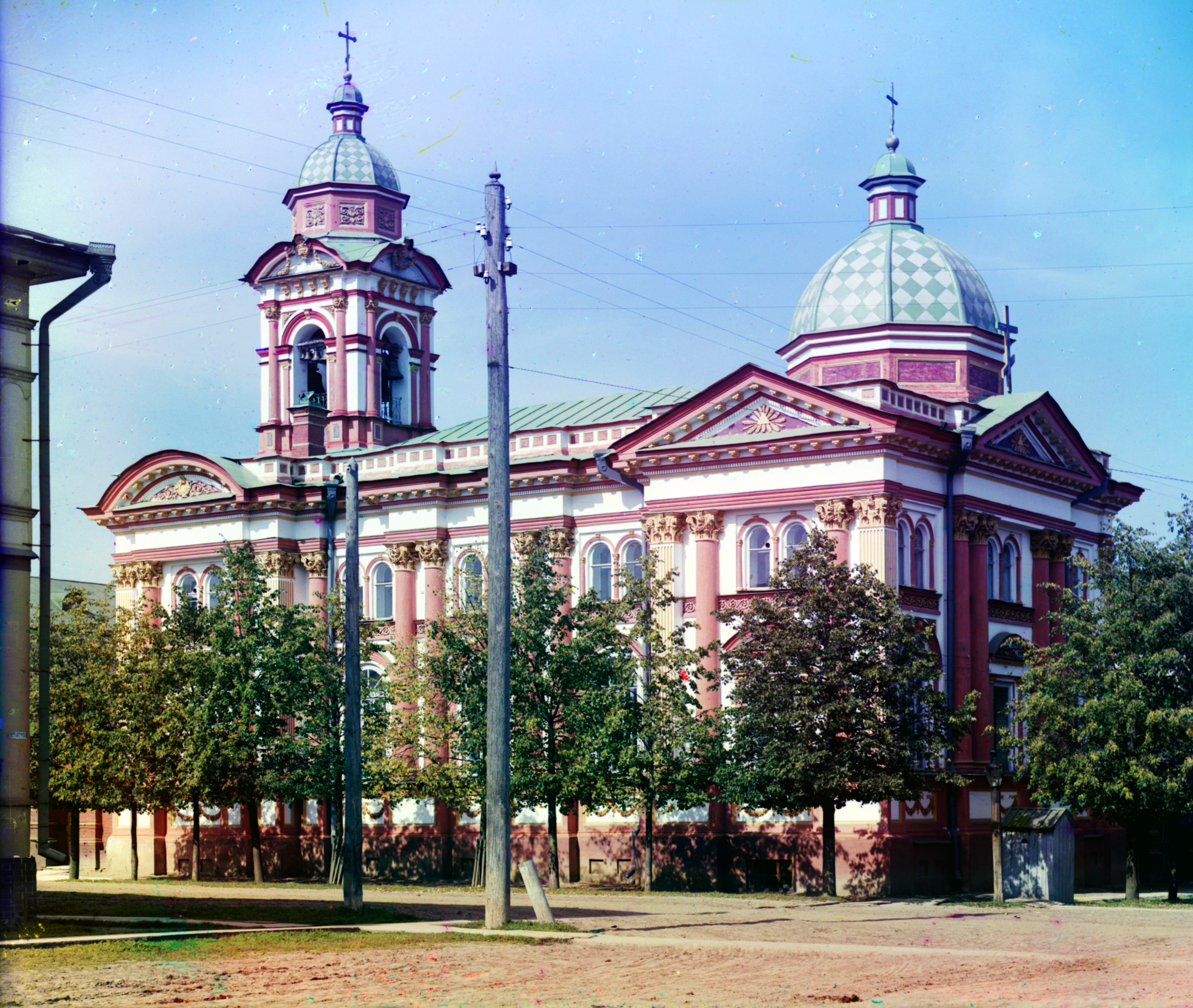
Mary Magdalene Church

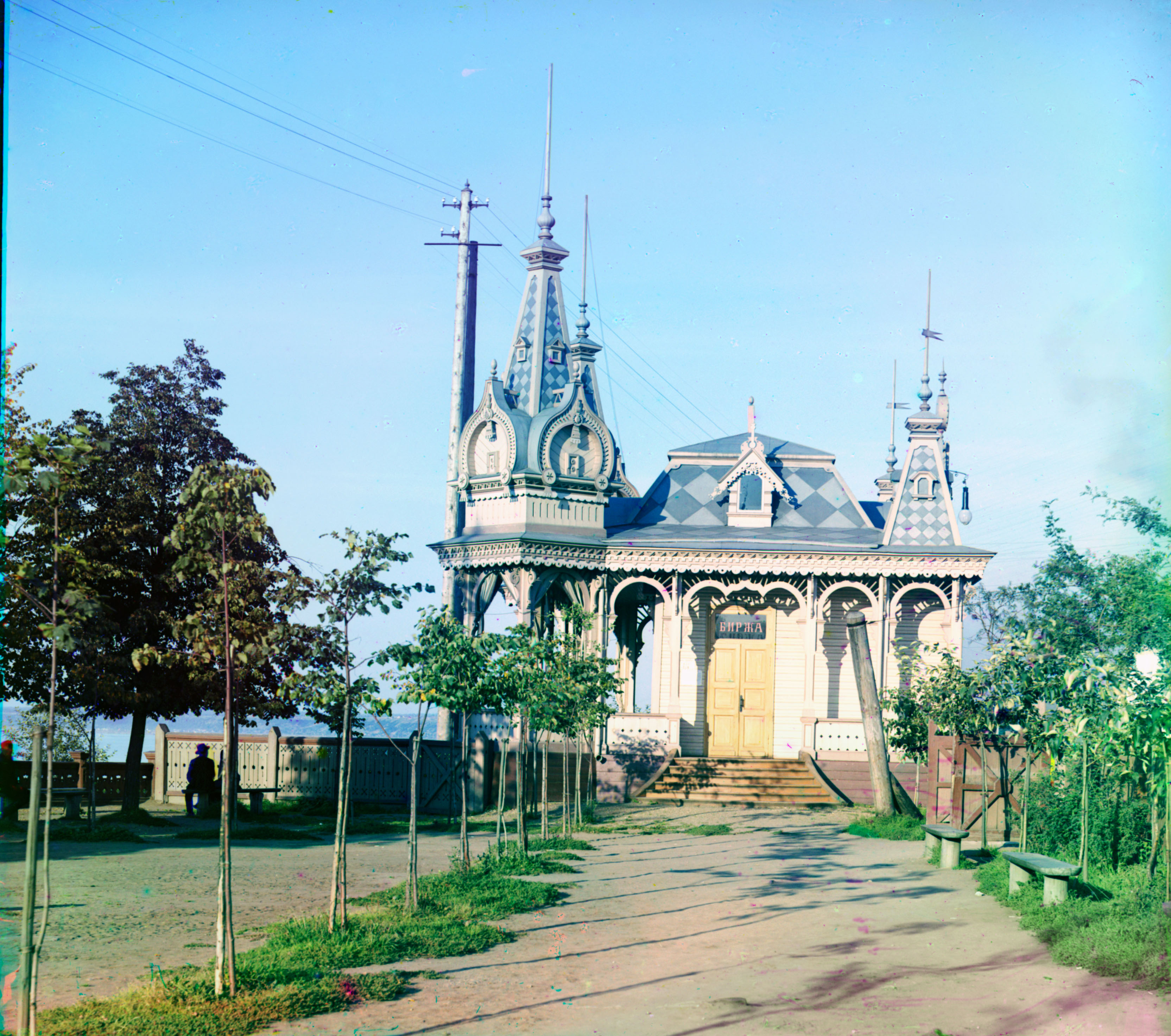
Summertime location of the exchange

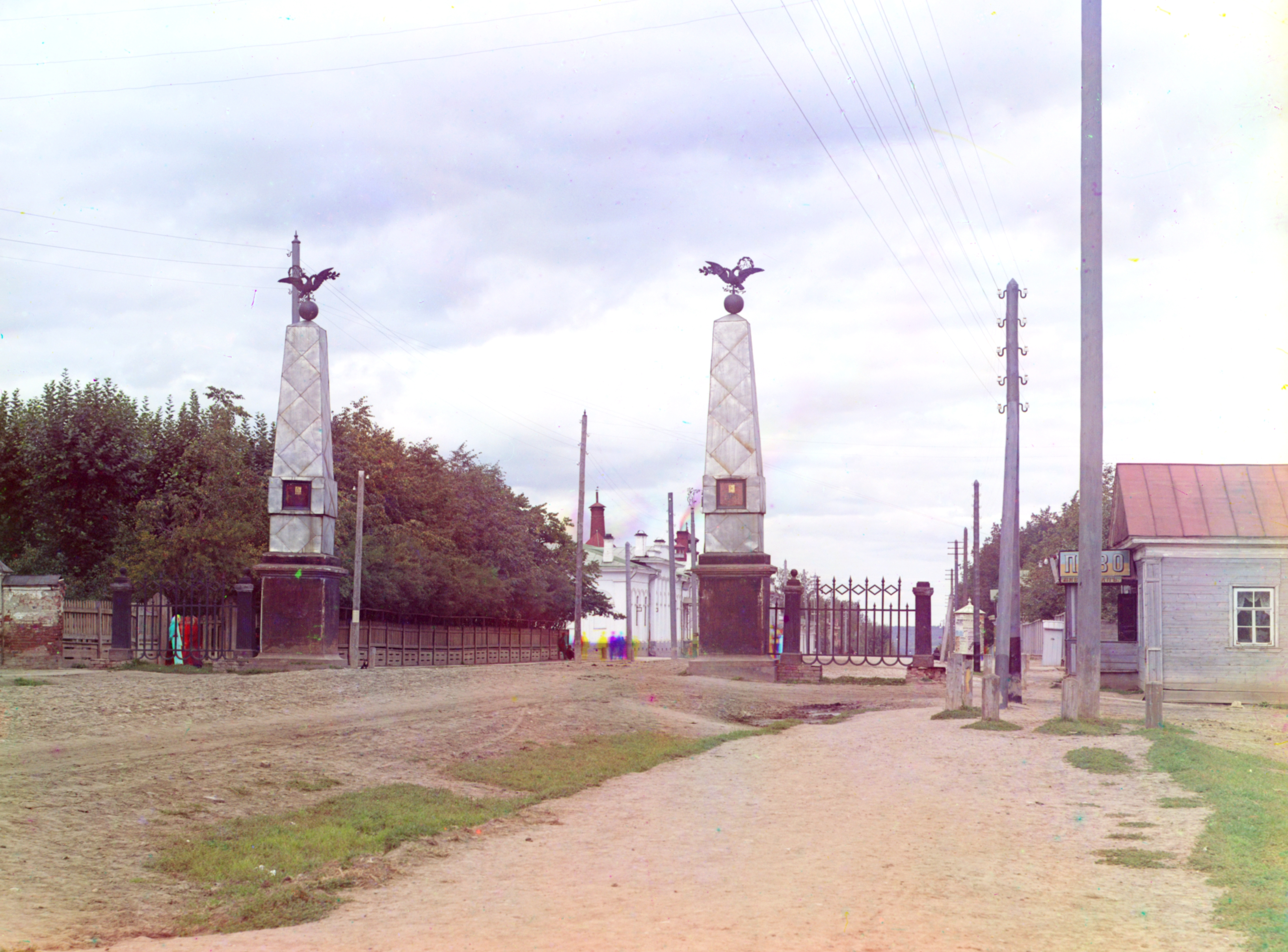
Staro-Sibirskaya Gate

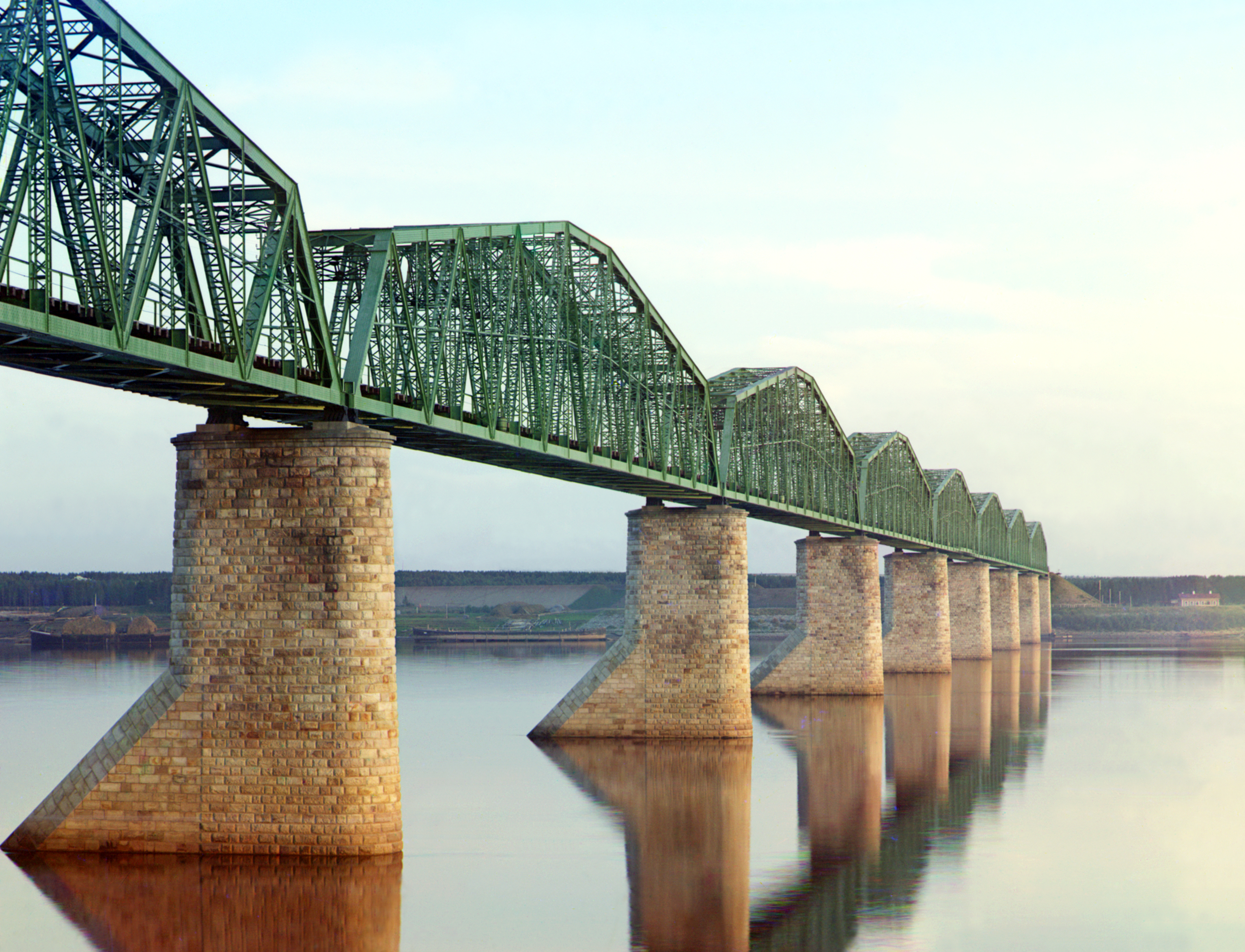
Kama River near Perm. The bridge still stands today, but another similar bridge has been built alongside it. Both are painted white.

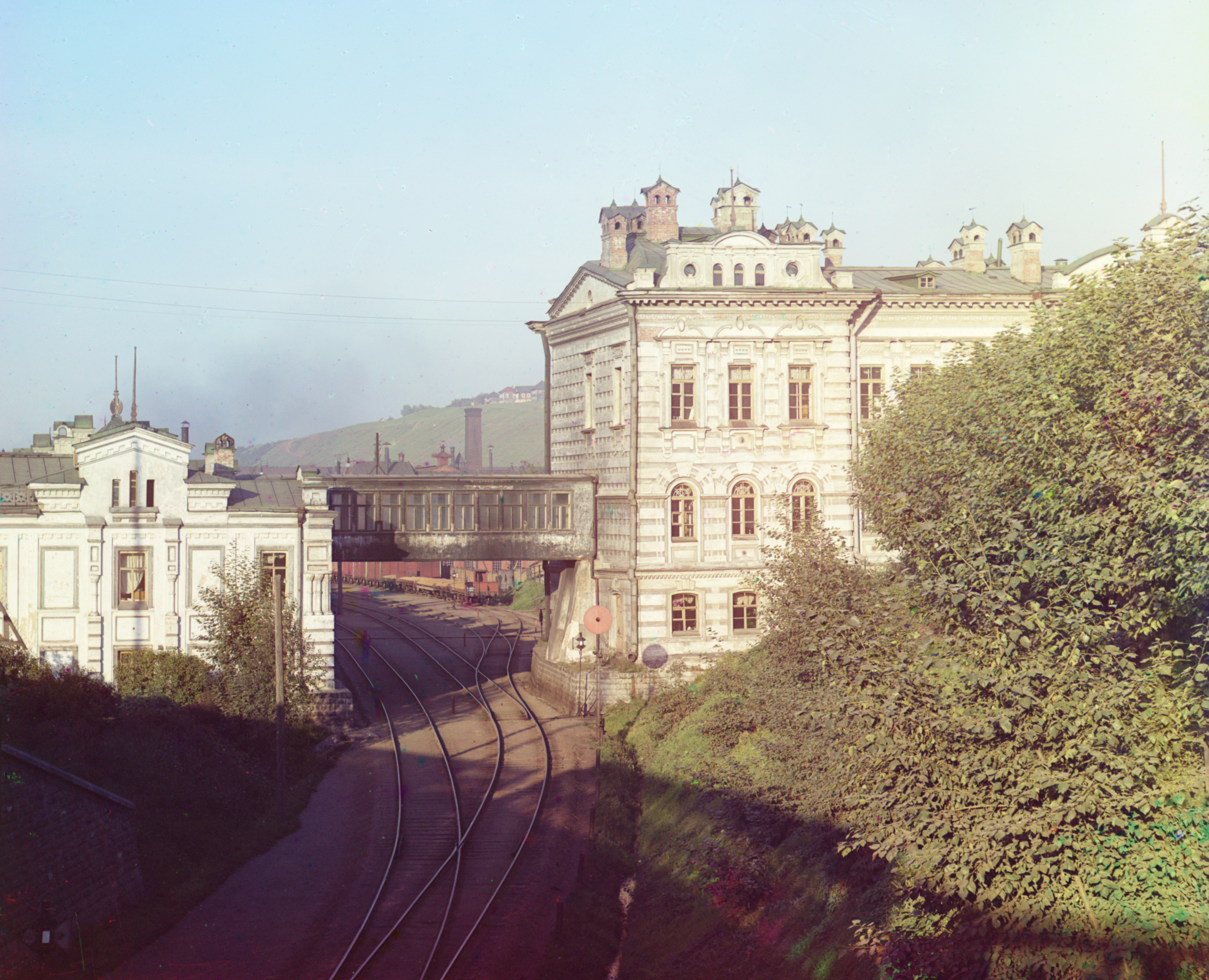
Headquarters of the Ural Railway Administration

=== Soviet period ===
In the 1930s, Perm grew as a major industrial city with aviation, shipbuilding, and chemical factories built during that period. During World War II, Perm was a vital center of artillery production in the Soviet Union. During the Cold War, Perm became a closed city.

=== Modern city ===
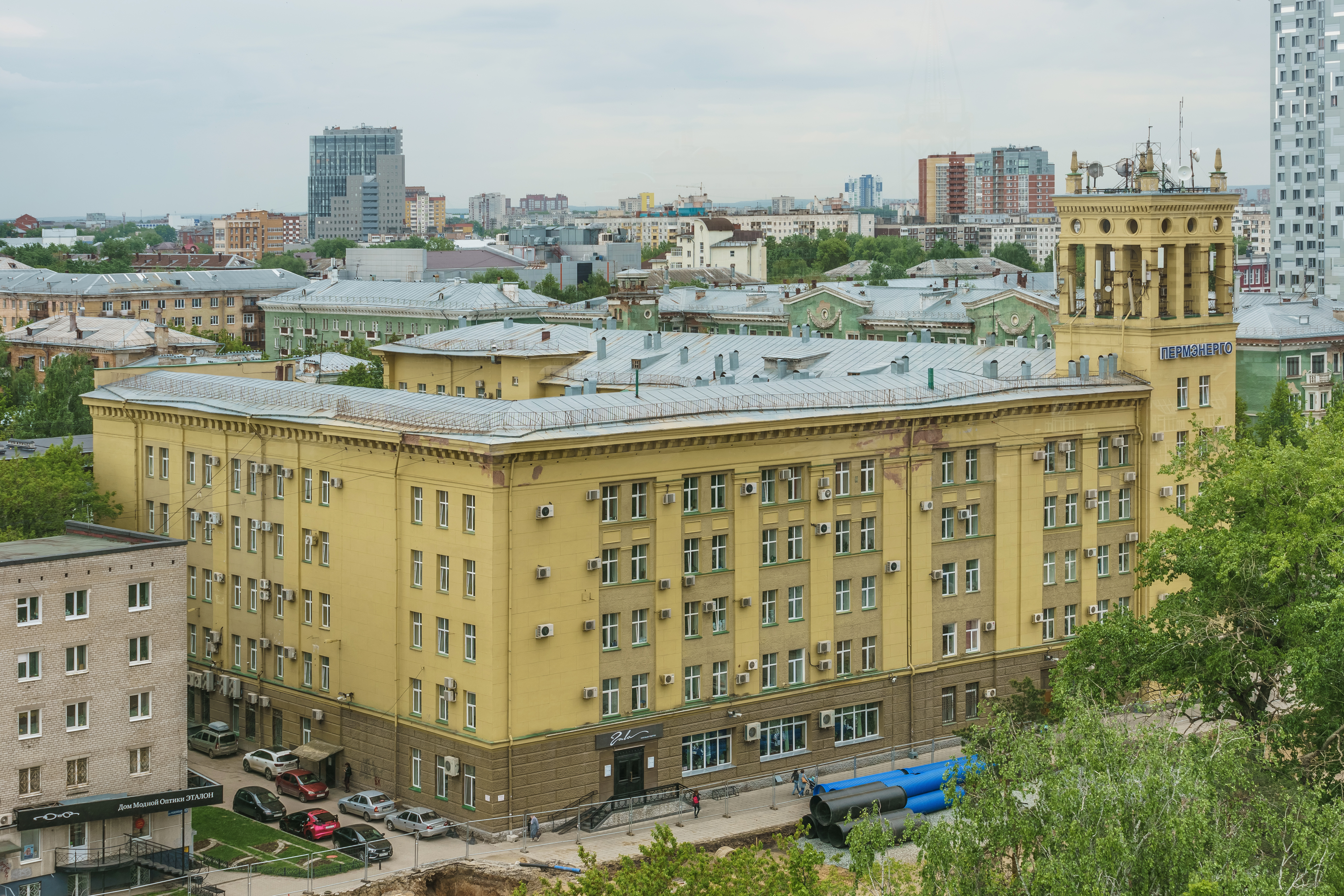
TGC-9

The city is a major administrative, industrial, scientific, and cultural centre. The leading industries include machinery, defence, oil production (about 3% of Russian output), oil refining, chemical and petrochemical, timber and wood processing and the food industry.

In 1996 a memorial was erected in the Yegoshikhinskoe cemetery to deceased inmates of the Gulag, forced settlers and victims of the Great Terror.

On 5 December 2009, a fire at the Lame Horse nightclub killed 156 people and injured over 100 more.

On 20 September 2021, a mass shooting occurred at Perm State University, resulting in six fatalities and 40 injuries.

== Geography ==
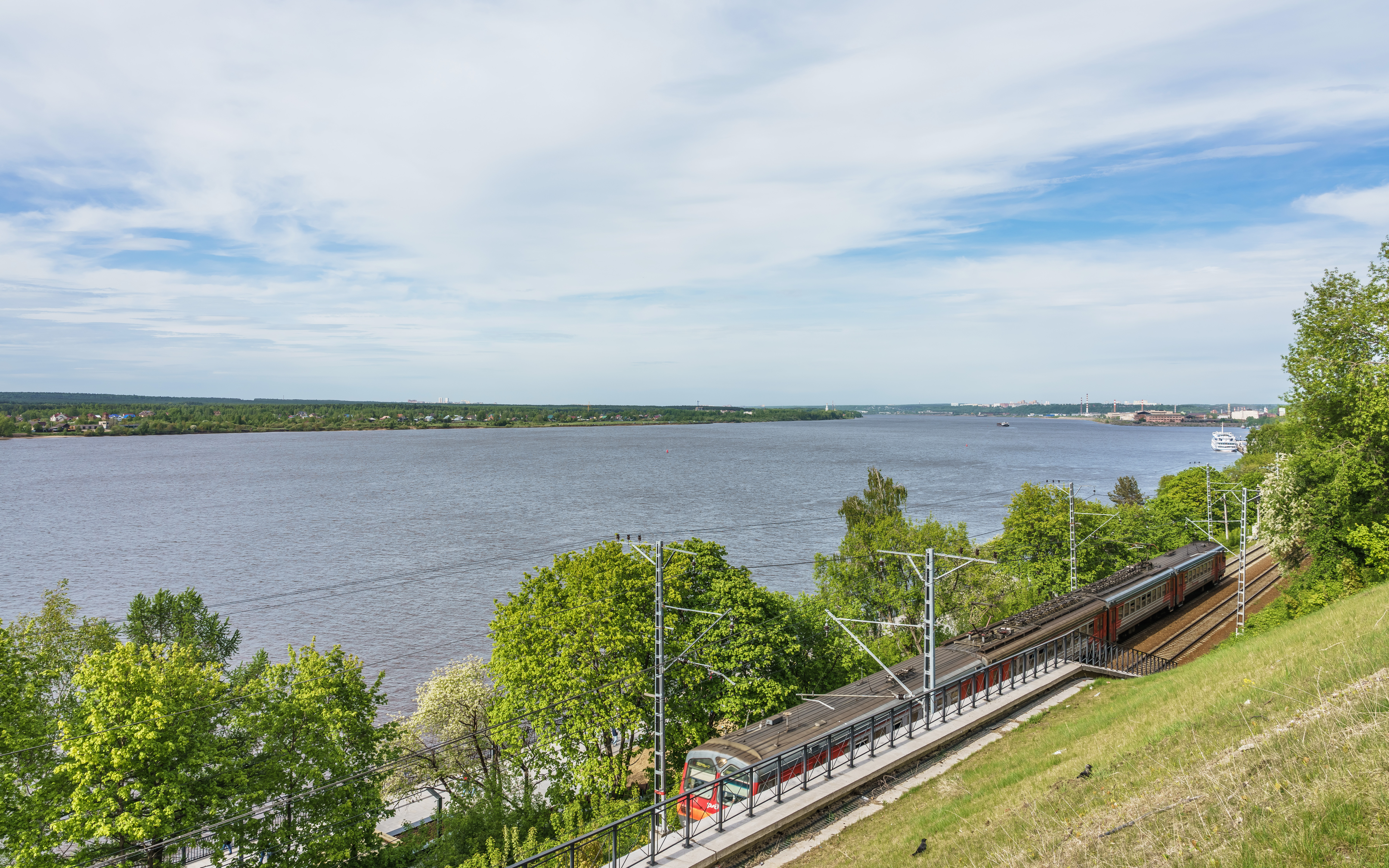
The Kama River in Perm

The city is located on the bank of the Kama River upon hilly terrain. The Kama is a left tributary of the Volga River. This river is the waterway which grants the Ural Mountains access to the White Sea, Baltic Sea, Sea of Azov, Black Sea, and Caspian Sea. The Kama divides the city into two parts: the central part and the right bank part. The city stretches for 70 kilometers (43 mi) along the Kama and 40 kilometers (25 mi) across it. The city street grid parallels the Kama River, travelling generally east–west, while other main streets run perpendicularly to those following the river. The grid pattern accommodates the hills of the city where it crosses them.

Another distinguishing feature of the city's relief is the large number of small rivers and brooks. The largest of them are the Mulyanka, the Yegoshikha, the Motovilikha (all are on the left bank of Kama River), and the Gayva (on the right bank).

=== Climate ===
Perm has a warm summer continental climate (Köppen: Dfb). Winters are long, snowy and quite cold. Summers are moderately warm with cool nights, although summers are shorter than winters. Due to its far inland location, there is a distinct lack of seasonal lag resulting in rapid cooling down of the warm weather as days get shorter. This results in September, October, and November being colder than May, April, and March, respectively.

Climate data for Perm (1991–2020, extremes 1882–present)
Month	Jan	Feb	Mar	Apr	May	Jun	Jul	Aug	Sep	Oct	Nov	Dec	Year
Record high °C (°F)	4.3 (39.7)	6.0 (42.8)	15.0 (59.0)	27.3 (81.1)	34.6 (94.3)	35.4 (95.7)	37.5 (99.5)	37.2 (99.0)	30.7 (87.3)	22.5 (72.5)	11.9 (53.4)	4.5 (40.1)	37.5 (99.5)
Mean daily maximum °C (°F)	−9.3 (15.3)	−7.5 (18.5)	0.2 (32.4)	9.1 (48.4)	17.7 (63.9)	22.0 (71.6)	24.0 (75.2)	20.7 (69.3)	14.5 (58.1)	6.3 (43.3)	−2.6 (27.3)	−7.8 (18.0)	7.3 (45.1)
Daily mean °C (°F)	−12.5 (9.5)	−11.3 (11.7)	−4.0 (24.8)	3.9 (39.0)	11.5 (52.7)	16.2 (61.2)	18.5 (65.3)	15.6 (60.1)	10.0 (50.0)	3.3 (37.9)	−5.2 (22.6)	−10.7 (12.7)	2.9 (37.2)
Mean daily minimum °C (°F)	−15.8 (3.6)	−14.8 (5.4)	−7.8 (18.0)	−0.6 (30.9)	5.8 (42.4)	10.9 (51.6)	13.2 (55.8)	11.2 (52.2)	6.6 (43.9)	0.9 (33.6)	−7.6 (18.3)	−13.7 (7.3)	−1.0 (30.2)
Record low °C (°F)	−44.9 (−48.8)	−40.8 (−41.4)	−34.8 (−30.6)	−23.5 (−10.3)	−13 (9)	−3.4 (25.9)	1.7 (35.1)	−1.9 (28.6)	−7.8 (18.0)	−25.2 (−13.4)	−38.5 (−37.3)	−47.1 (−52.8)	−47.1 (−52.8)
Average precipitation mm (inches)	45 (1.8)	33 (1.3)	34 (1.3)	37 (1.5)	55 (2.2)	89 (3.5)	78 (3.1)	88 (3.5)	64 (2.5)	63 (2.5)	56 (2.2)	48 (1.9)	690 (27.2)
Average extreme snow depth cm (inches)	48 (19)	61 (24)	60 (24)	19 (7.5)	0 (0)	0 (0)	0 (0)	0 (0)	0 (0)	2 (0.8)	12 (4.7)	30 (12)	61 (24)
Average rainy days	1	2	4	11	18	18	17	20	21	17	7	3	139
Average snowy days	28	24	19	9	4	0.4	0	0	2	13	24	27	150
Average relative humidity (%)	83	79	72	65	62	68	71	77	80	82	85	85	76
Mean monthly sunshine hours	38	79	152	198	275	290	284	226	132	65	37	23	1,799
Source 1: Pogoda.ru.net
Source 2: NOAA (sun, 1961–1990)

== Administrative and municipal status ==
Perm is the administrative centre of the krai and, within the framework of administrative divisions, it also serves as the administrative center of Permsky District, even though it is not a part of it. As an administrative division, it is, together with two rural localities, incorporated separately as the city of krai significance of Perm—an administrative unit with the status equal to that of the districts. As a municipal division, the city of krai significance of Perm is incorporated as Perm Urban Okrug.

=== City divisions ===
Administrative divisions

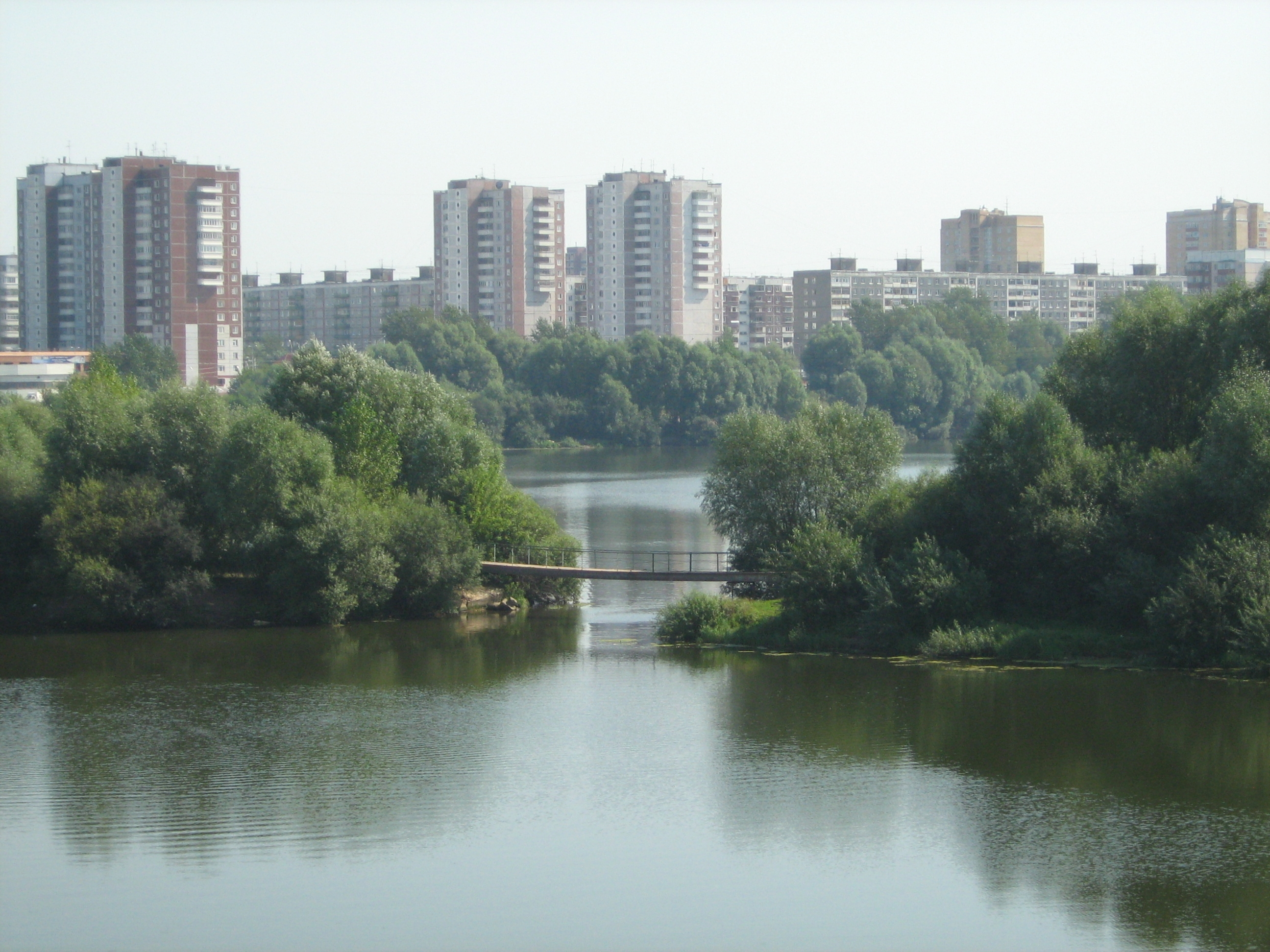
A view from the new bridge along the Stroiteley Street

For administrative purposes, Perm is divided into seven city districts:

City District	Population (2010 Census)
Dzerzhinsky	155,632
Industrialny	157,575
Kirovsky	127,793
Leninsky	48,520
Motovilikhinsky	179,961
Ordzhonikidzevsky	111,204
Sverdlovsky	210,477

== Economy ==
Perm has the largest industrial output among cities in the Urals, ahead of Yekaterinburg, Chelyabinsk and Ufa, although Perm has a smaller population than these. Thirty-five per cent of the industry of Perm Oblast (now Perm Krai) is located in Perm. The largest industries in the city are electric power engineering, oil and gas refining, machine building, chemicals and petrochemicals, forestry processing, printing and food industry.

Several major industrial companies are located in Perm: Perm refinery; Perm Motors and Aviadvigatel, major suppliers of engines to the Russian aircraft industry; rocket engine company Proton-PM, which manufactures components of the RD-191 engine for the Angara rocket family; electric engineering firms Morion JSC, Perm Scientific and Industrial Group, and Perm Electrical Engineering Plant; Russia's largest exporter of cables and wires, JSC KAMKABEL; and oil and natural gas companies such as LUKoil-Perm Ltd. and LUKoilPernefteprodukt Ltd.

== Transport ==
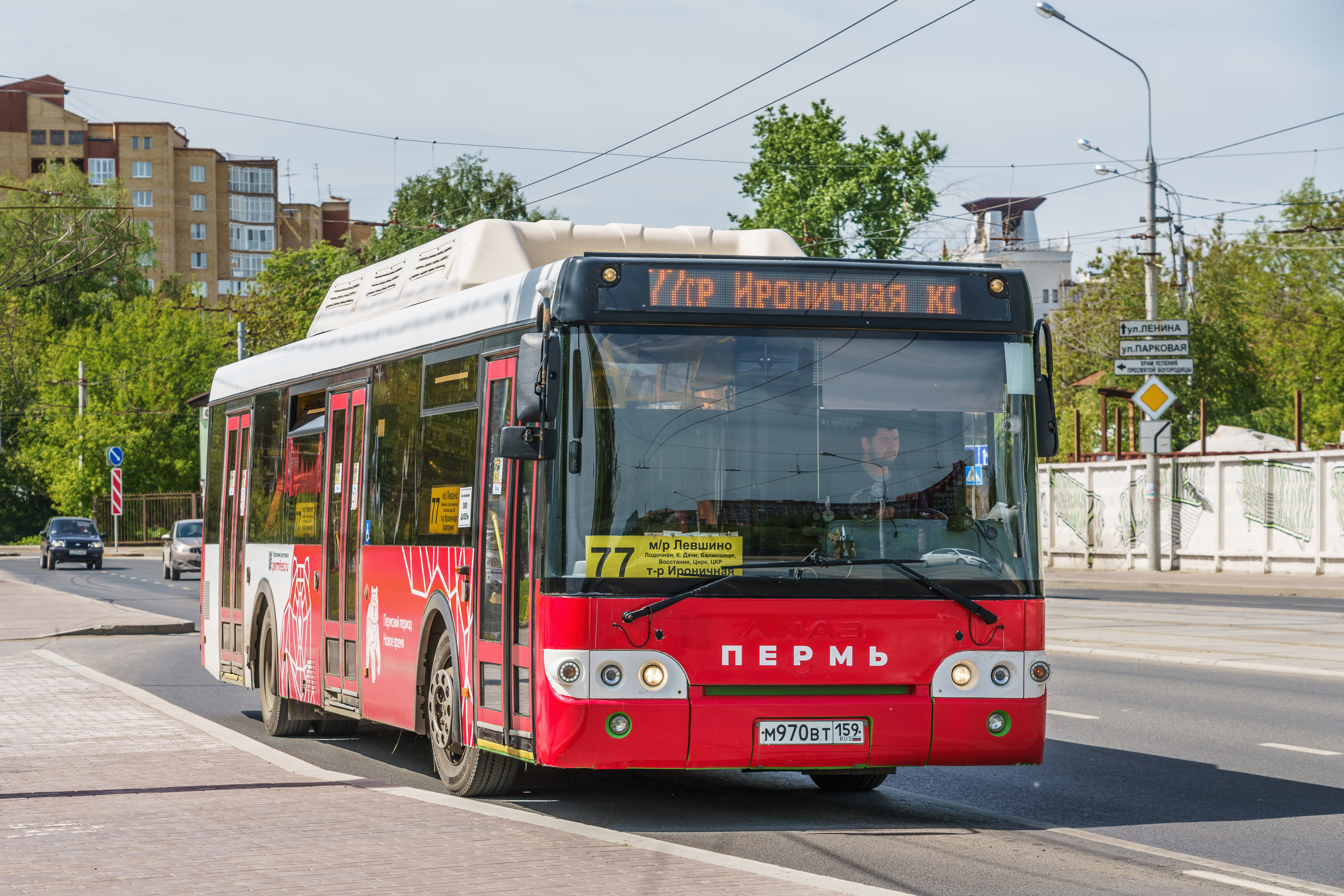
LiAZ-5292 (CNG motor version) city bus.

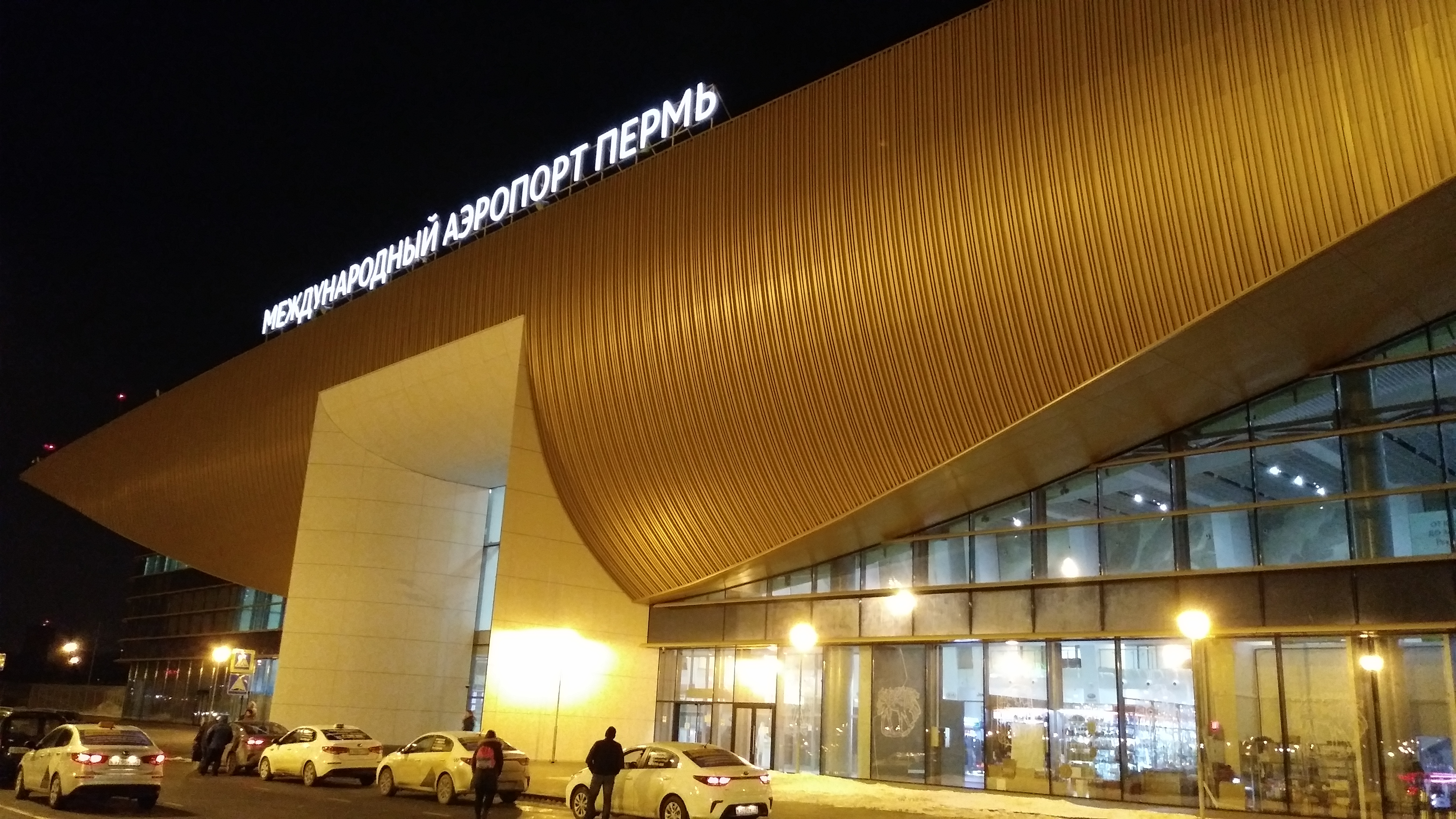
Perm International Airport.

Perm is a railway junction on the Trans-Siberian Railway with lines radiating to Central Russia, the north part of the Urals, and the far east of Russia. Perm has two major railway stations, the historical Perm I and the modern Perm II. The Kama River is an important direct link between the European part of Russia to the sea ports on the White, Baltic, Azov, Black, and Caspian seas.

Perm is served by the international airport Bolshoye Savino, which is located 16 km (9.9 mi) southwest of the city.

Perm's public transit network includes tram, bus, and city-railway routes. The formerly important trolleybus service was discontinued in July 2019.

=== Proposed metro system ===
The first plans for a Perm Metro system date back to the 1970s. A feasibility study was compiled in 1990, but economic difficulties during the decade prevented its final planning and construction. The plans were revitalised in the early 2000s, but a lack of funding hampered the project and plans were once again put on hold. Light rail has also been considered.

== Culture ==
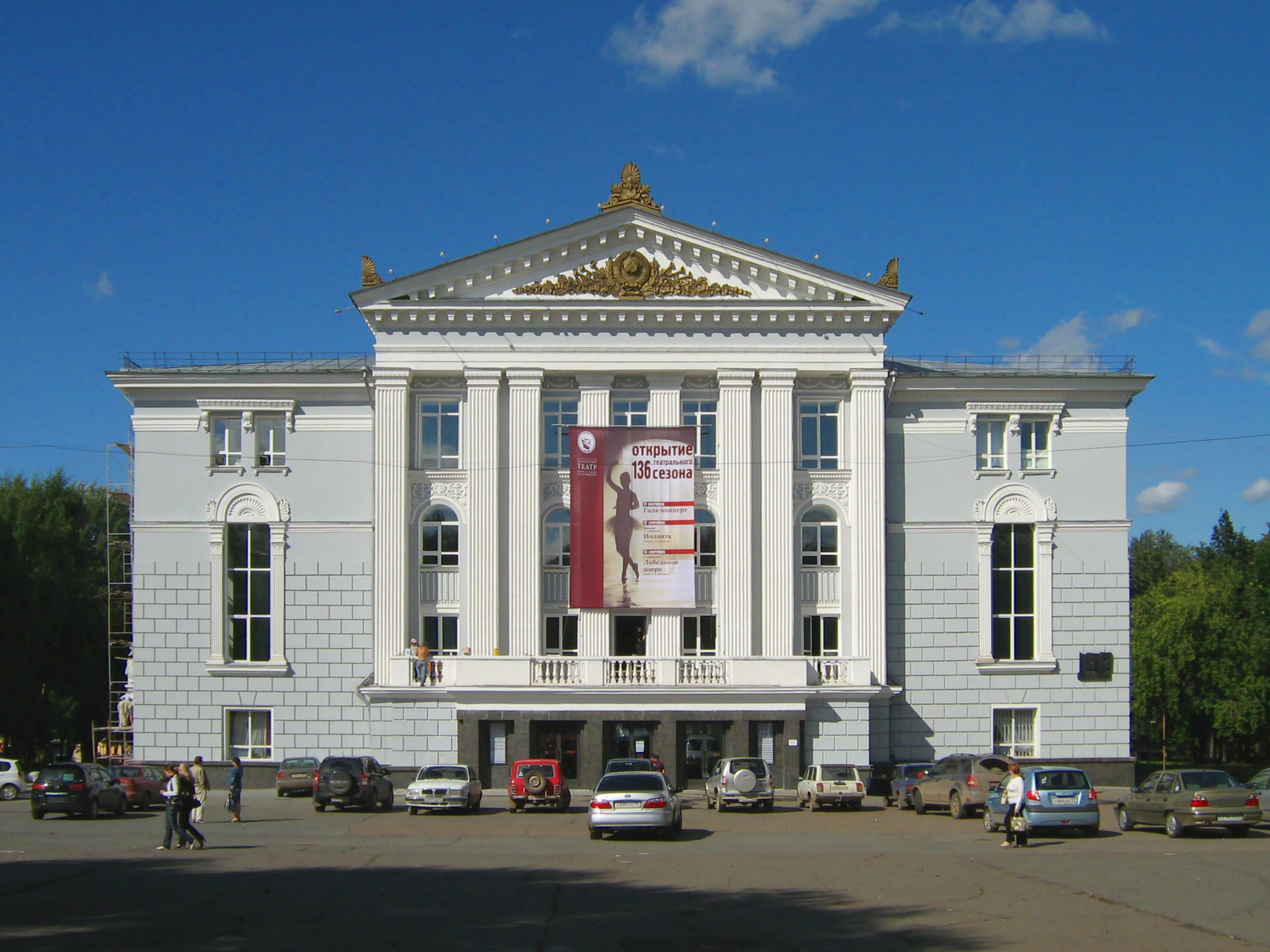
Perm Opera and Ballet Theatre

The Perm Opera and Ballet Theatre is one of the oldest musical theatres in Russia. There are many other theatres in Perm, including the Drama Theater, the Puppet Theatre, the Theatre for Young Spectators, the Theatre "Stage Molot", and the mystical At the Bridge Theatre. Among the city's museums and galleries, the Perm State Art Gallery is recognised for its collections of art, including paintings from 15th- to 18th-century art movements, and wooden sculptures from the region. It is housed in a notable early 19th-century structure, once an orthodox cathedral. The spire of the museum towers over the rest of Perm, as it is situated on the Komsomolsky Prospect. Perm is receiving attention from the development of the new Museum of Contemporary Art, Perm Museum of Contemporary Art (PERMM) which officially opened in March 2009.

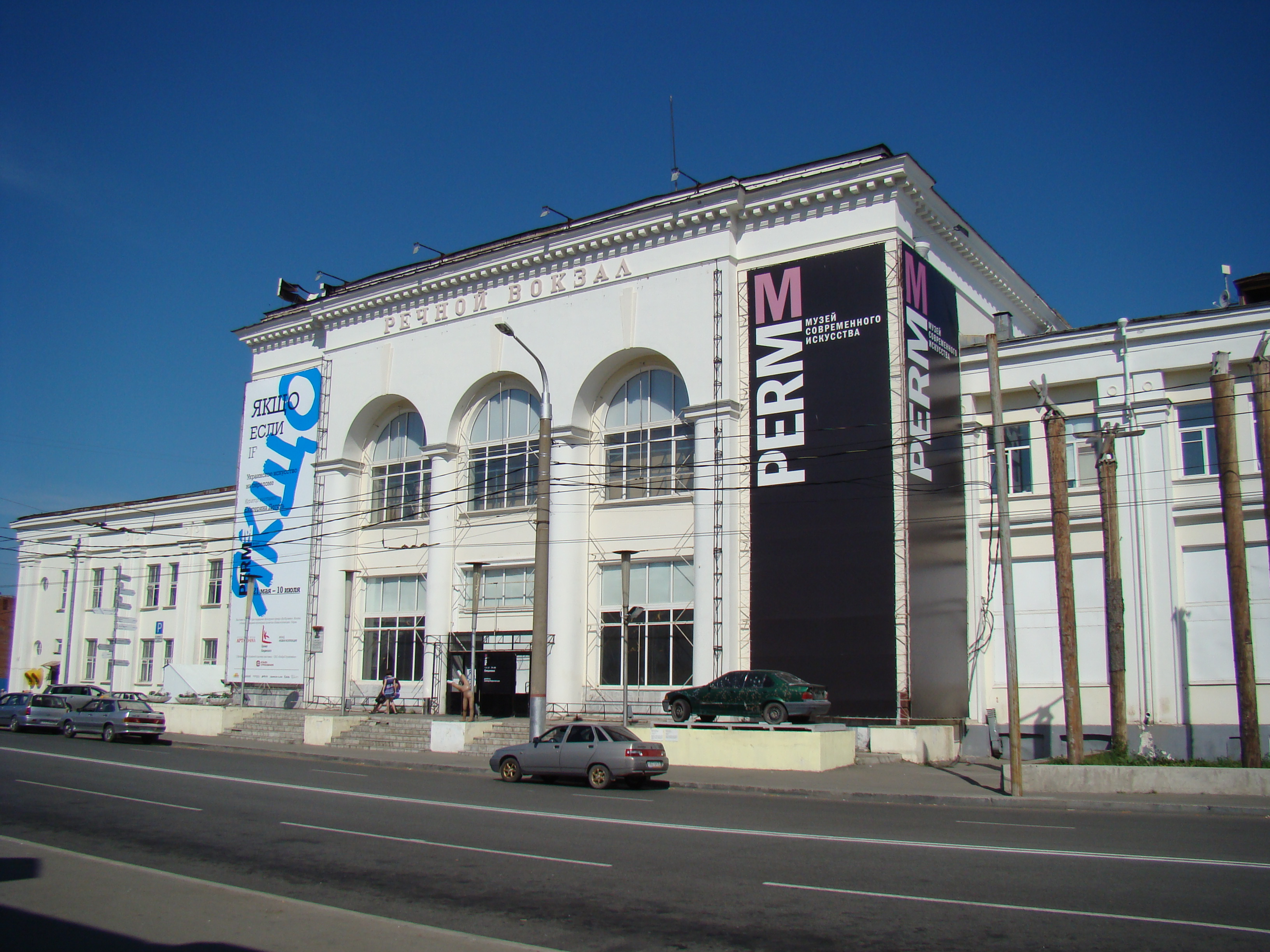
Perm Museum of Contemporary Art (PERMM) in the building of the Perm River Terminal.

The RAV Vast steel tongue drum was invented in Perm by Andrey Remyannikov. This instrument is unique in the tongue drum and handpan world because each note has multiple harmonic overtones that resonate with other notes in the drum. The sound consequently has long sustain and reverberation.

The Legend of Perm Bear or The Walking Bear is a sculpture depicting a walking bear, which is also shown on the city's coat of arms. It is situated in the central part of the city on Lenin Street, in front of the Organ Concert Hall and close to the building of Legislative Assembly of Perm Krai. The author of the sculpture is Vladimir Pavlenko, a monumentalist sculptor from Nizhny Tagil, member of the Artists' Union of Russia and UNESCO International Association of Arts.

The Permyak Salty Ears is a sculpture and one of the most visited tourist attractions in Perm.

== Education ==
Perm is a scientific centre. Some of the scientific institutes are combined in the Perm Scientific Center of the Ural Branch of the Russian Academy of Sciences.

Perm is a home to several major universities including Perm State University, Perm State Technical University, Perm branch of state university Higher school of economics, Perm State Teachers' Training University, Perm State Medical Academy, Perm State Pharmaceutical Academy, Perm State Agricultural Academy, The Institute of Art and Culture, Perm State Choreographic School, and others. There are also three military schools in Perm.

== Demographics ==
Religion in Perm (2024)
1. Orthodox Christianity (70.0%)
2. Islam (10.0%)
3. Atheists / Non-Religious (15.0%)
4. other christians (4.00%)
5. difficult to say (1.00%)

Historical population

Year	Pop.	±%
1861	13,472	—
1879	32,316	+139.9%
1897	45,205	+39.9%
1926	82,249	+81.9%
1939	255,236	+210.3%
1959	629,118	+146.5%

Year	Pop.	±%
1970	850,324	+35.2%
1979	999,157	+17.5%
1989	1,090,944	+9.2%
2002	1,001,653	−8.2%
2010	991,162	−1.0%
2021	1,034,002	+4.3%

Source: and census data

At the time of the official 2010 Census, the ethnic makeup of the city's population whose ethnicity was known (907,955) was:

Ethnicity	Population	Percentage
Russians	823,333	90.7%
Tatars	34,253	3.8%
Bashkirs	7,729	0.8%
Komi-Permyaks	7,301	0.8%
Ukrainians	6,507	0.7%
Udmurts	4,847	0.5%
Others	23,985	2.7%

== Sports ==
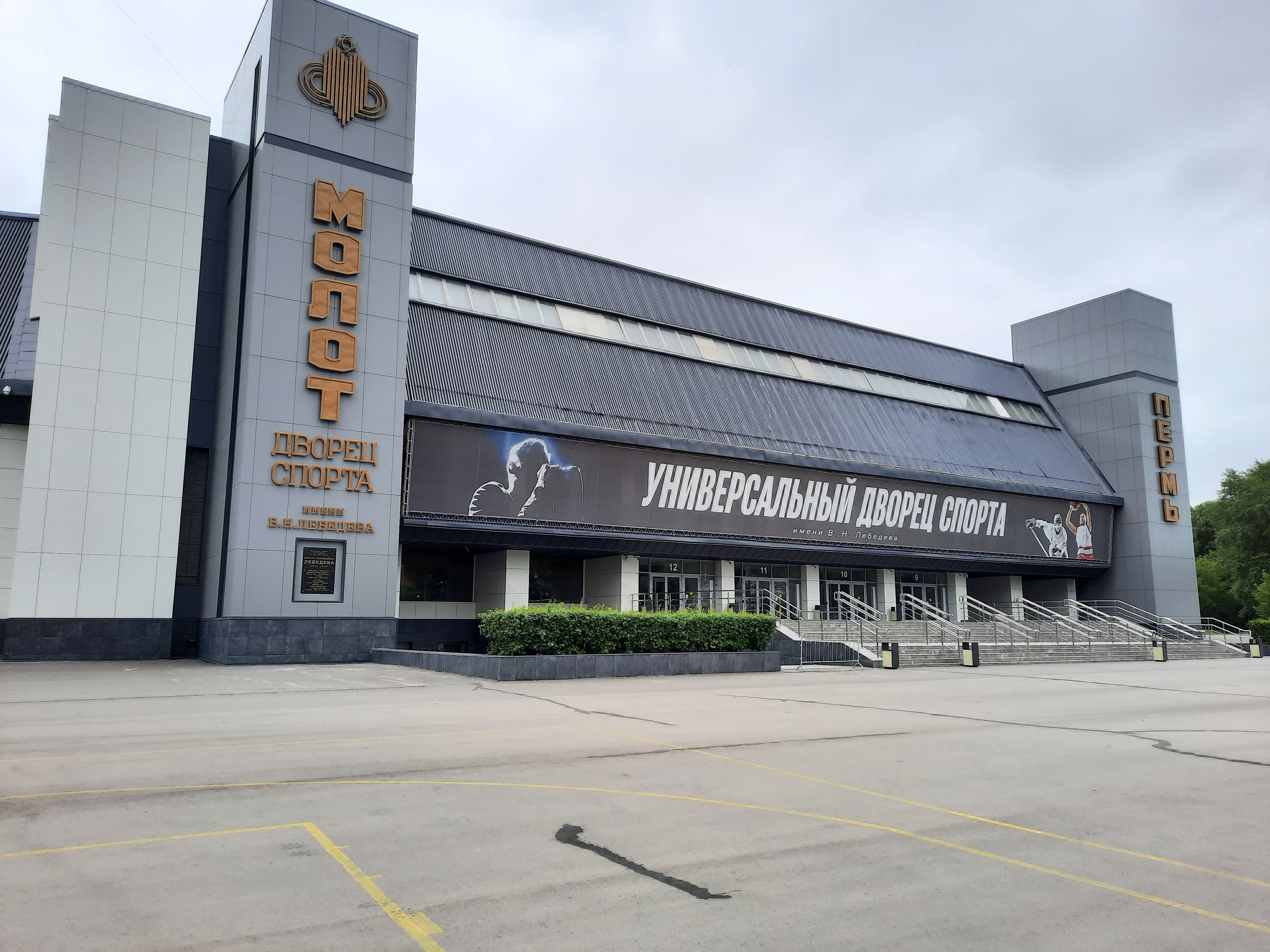
Universal Sports Palace Molot, home venue of the Parma Basket basketball team and Molot-Prikamye Perm ice hockey team

The city hosted 2002 European Amateur Boxing Championships.

Club	Sport	Founded	Current league	League Rank	Stadium
Zvezda 2005 Perm	Football	1994	Women's Supreme League	1st	Zvezda Stadium
Oktan Perm	Football	1958	Russian Second Division	3rd	Neftyanik Stadium
Molot-Prikamye Perm	Ice Hockey	1948	Higher Hockey League	2nd	Universal Sports Palace Molot
Prikamye Perm	Volleyball	1983	Volleyball Super League	1st	Sukharev Sports Complex
Permskie Medvedi	Handball	1999	Handball Super League	1st	Permskie Medvedi Sports Complex
Parma Basket	Basketball	2012	VTB United League	1st	Universal Sports Palace Molot

In 1995–2008, Perm was the location of the Ural Great basketball team — one of the few Russian basketball champions besides CSKA Moscow.

There is also an amateur bandy team called Kama.

== People ==
The following people were either born in Perm or made names for themselves while residing there.

- Tatiana Borodina (born c. 1972), opera soprano
- Sergei Diaghilev (1872–1929), ballet impresario
- Alexei Ivanov (born 1969) award-winning writer.
- Dmitry Mamin-Sibiryak (1852–1912) author of novels and short stories set in the Ural Mountains.
- Tanya Mityushina (born 1993), model
- Nikolay Moiseyev (1902–1955) a Soviet astronomer and expert in celestial mechanics
- Andronic Nikolsky (1870–1918), first Russian Orthodox Church Bishop of Kyoto, Japan
- Mikhail Osorgin (1878–1942) a Russian writer, journalist and essayist.
- Natasha Poly (born 1985), supermodel
- Alexander Stepanovich Popov (1859–1905), physicist; regarded locally as the inventor of radio
- Dmitry Rybolovlev (born 1966) oligarch, billionaire businessman and investor
- Katerina Shpitsa (born 1985), actress of theatre and cinema
- Mikhail Shuisky (1883–1953), baritone opera singer
- Arkady Shvetsov (1892–1953), aircraft engine designer
- Nikolay Slavyanov (1854–1897), inventor of an early method of arc welding
- Peter Struve (1870–1944), political economist, philosopher and editor
- Yuri Trutnev (born 1956), politician, Presidential Envoy to the Far Eastern Federal District
- Andrey Voronikhin (1759–1814), architect and painter

=== Sport ===
- Michael Beilin (born 1976), Israeli Olympic Greco-Roman wrestler
- Sergei Belov (1944–2013), basketball player, 1972 Olympic champion; coached in Perm
- Vladimir Chagin (born 1970), rally raid driver in the Dakar Rally
- Alexandra Kosteniuk (born 1984), 2008 Women's World Chess Champion
- Vladimirs Lubkins (born 1963), retired Latvian ice hockey player
- Matvei Michkov (born 2004), NHL Right Wing for the Philadelphia Flyers
- Nadezhda Oleneva (born 1985), mountaineer
- Tatiana Totmianina (born 1981), pair skater, 2006 Olympic Champion
- Maxim Trankov (born 1983), pairs figure skater, 2014 Olympic Champion
- Konstantin Zyryanov (born 1977), footballer with 52 caps for Russia
- Savely Korostelev (born 2003), cross-country skier.

Writer Boris Pasternak lived in Perm for a time. The city figures in his novel Doctor Zhivago under the fictional name "Yuriatin", where Yuri sees Lara again in the public library.

== Marketing ==
Perm is an example of city marketing in Russia, where the city also has a logo.

== Twin towns – sister cities ==
Perm is or has been twinned with:

- Agrigento, Italy (2012)
- Amnéville, France (1992)
- Duisburg, Germany (2007)
- Louisville, United States (1994; suspended)
- Oxford, United Kingdom (1995–2022)
- Qingdao, China (2006)

== See also ==
- Immaculate Conception Church, Perm
- Stephen of Perm

== Sources ==
- "Perm Online". Perm City Forum. Archived from the original on January 28, 2020.
- Законодательное собрание Пермской области. Закон №416-67 от 28 февраля 1996 г. «Об административно-территориальном устройстве Пермского края», в ред. Закона №504-ПК от 9 июля 2015 г. «О внесении изменений в Закон Пермской области "Об административно-территориальном устройстве Пермского края"». Вступил в силу с момента опубликования. Опубликован: "Звезда", №38, 12 марта 1996 г. (Legislative Assembly of Perm Oblast. Law #416-67 of February 28, 1996 On the Administrative-Territorial Structure of Perm Krai, as amended by the Law #504-PK of July 9, 2015 On Amending the Law of Perm Oblast "On the Administrative-Territorial Structure of Perm Krai". Effective as of the moment of publication.).
- Законодательное собрание Пермской области. Закон №2038-446 от 11 февраля 2005 г. «Об утверждении границ и о наделении статусом муниципального образования "Город Пермь" Пермского края», в ред. Закона №499-ПК от 16 октября 2009 г «О внесении изменений в отдельные законодательные акты Пермской области и Коми-Пермяцкого автономного округа». Вступил в силу через десять дней со дня официального опубликования (12 марта 2005 г.), за исключением отдельных положений, вступивших в силу в иные сроки. Опубликован: "Российская газета", №41, 2 марта 2005 г. (Legislative Assembly of Perm Oblast. Law #2038-446 of February 11, 2005 On Establishing the Borders and on Granting the Status to the Municipal Formation of the "City of Perm" of Perm Krai, as amended by the Law #499-PK of October 16, 2009 On Amending Various Legislative Acts of Perm Oblast and Komi-Permyak Autonomous Okrug. Effective as of the day which is ten days following the day of the official publication (March 12, 2005), with the exception of certain clauses, which took effect on different dates.).
- Законодательное собрание Пермской области. Закон №1868-402 от 1 декабря 2004 г. «Об утверждении границ и о наделении статусом муниципальных образований Пермского района Пермского края», в ред. Закона №273-ПК от 14 декабря 2013 г. «О внесении изменений в отдельные Законы Пермской области, Коми-Пермяцкого автономного округа, Пермского края». Вступил в силу через десять дней со дня официального опубликования. Опубликован: "Бюллетень Законодательного Собрания и администрации Пермской области", №1, II часть, 27 января 2005 г. (Legislative Assembly of Perm Oblast. Law #1868-402 of December 1, 2004 On Establishing the Borders and on Granting the Status to the Municipal Formations of Permsky District of Perm Krai, as amended by the Law #273-PK of December 14, 2013 On Amending Various Laws of Perm Oblast, Komi-Permyak Autonomous Okrug, Perm Krai. Effective as of the day which is ten days following the day of the official publication.).
