= Yegoshikha (river) =

River in Perm Krai, Russia

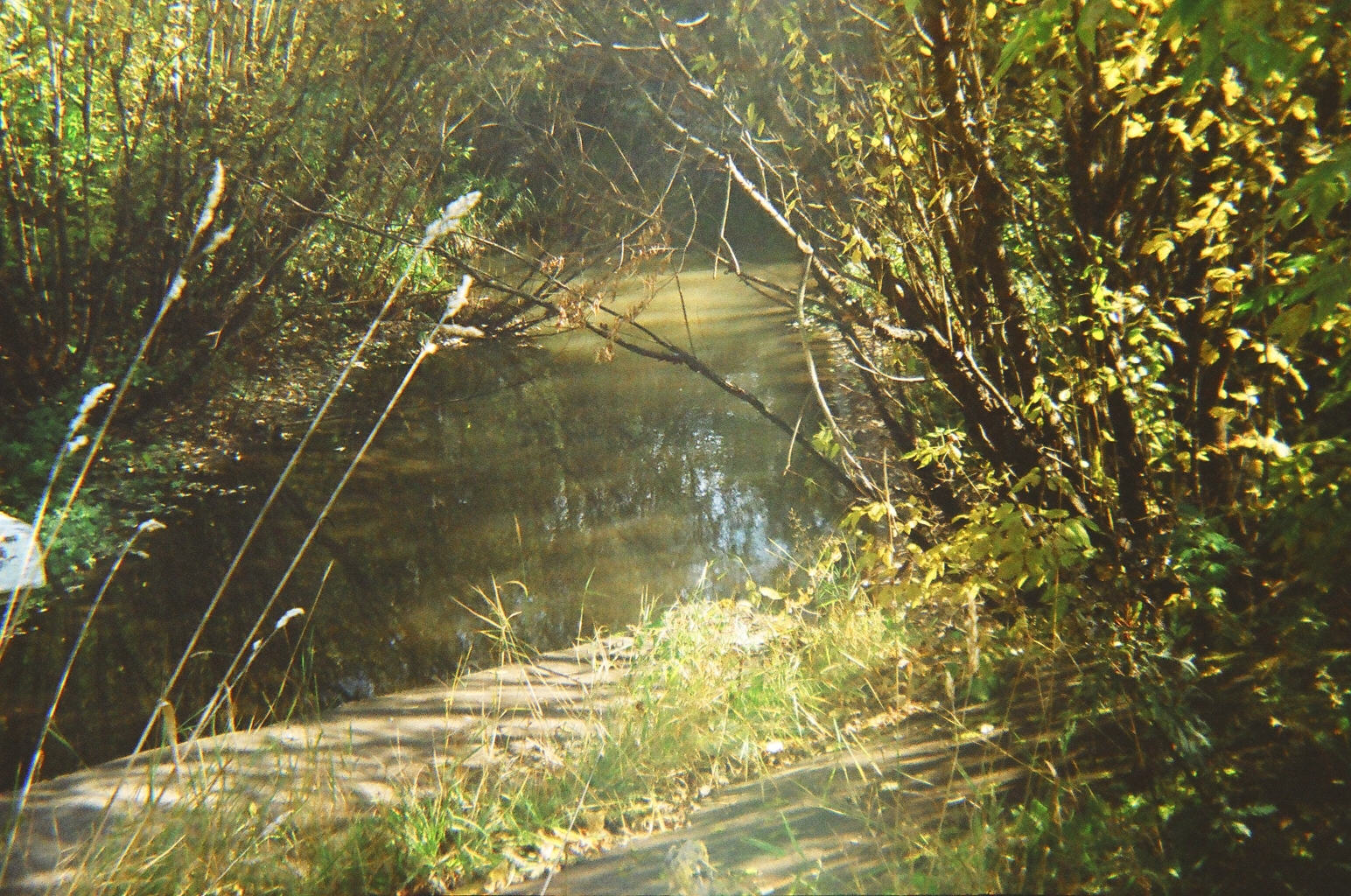
- Yegoshikha River near the North Dam

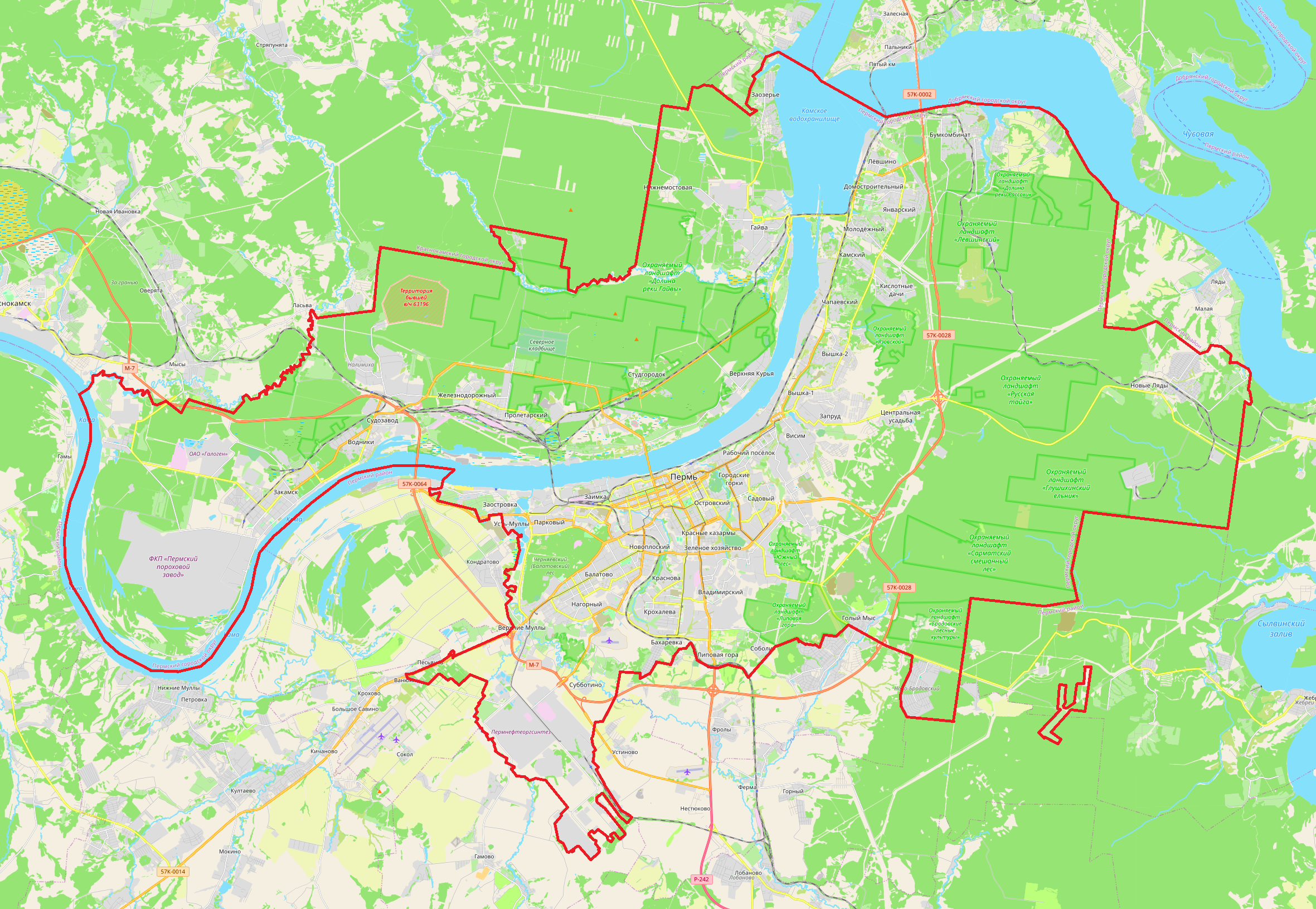
- Yegoshikha River location in Perm

Location
- Country: Russia

Physical characteristics
- Source
  - location: Perm Krai
- Mouth: Kama
  - coordinates: 58.0218°N 56.2543°E

Basin features
- Progression: Kama→ Volga→ Caspian Sea

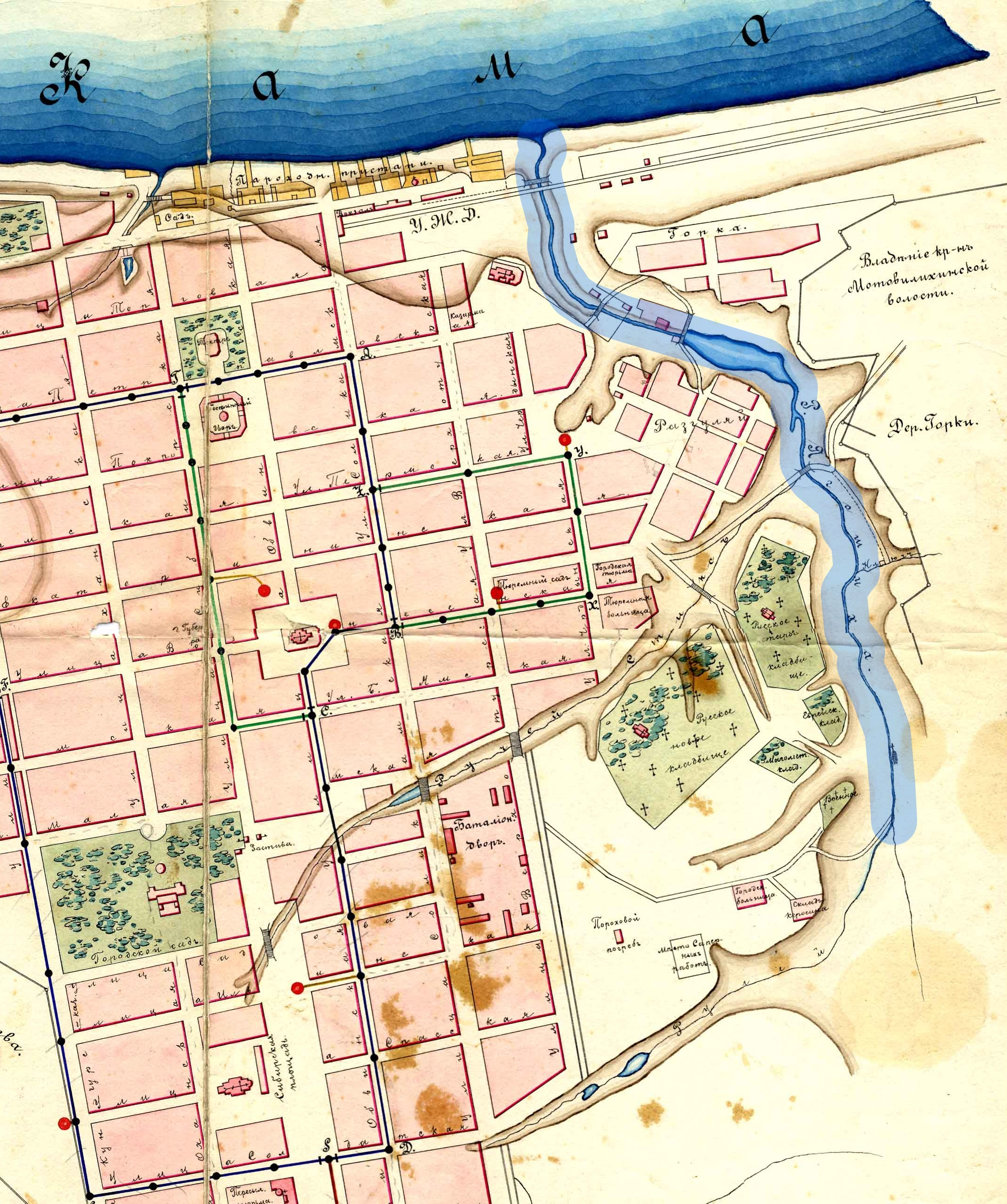
Yegoshikha on the 1898 map of Perm

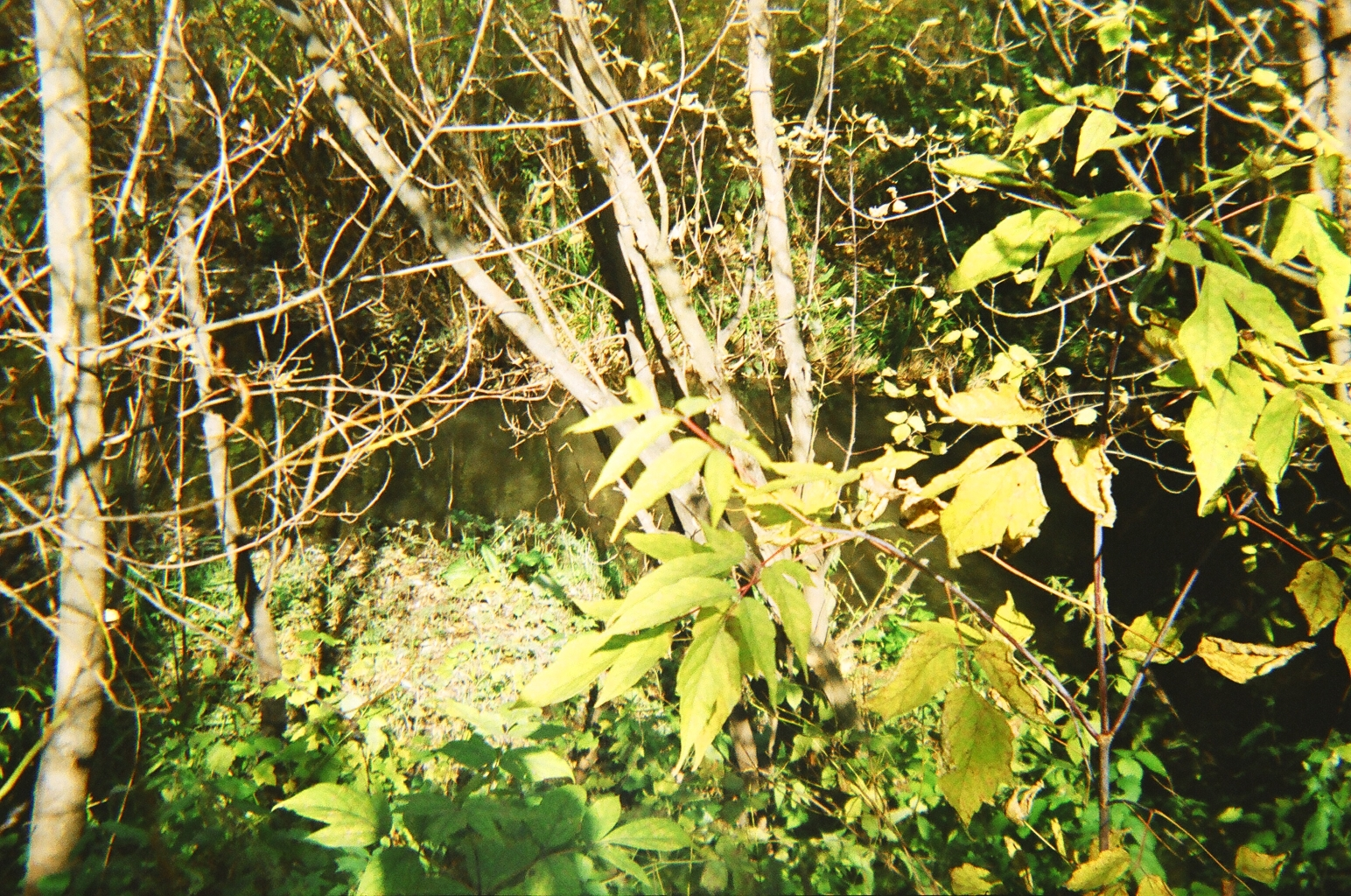
The bank of Yegoshikha

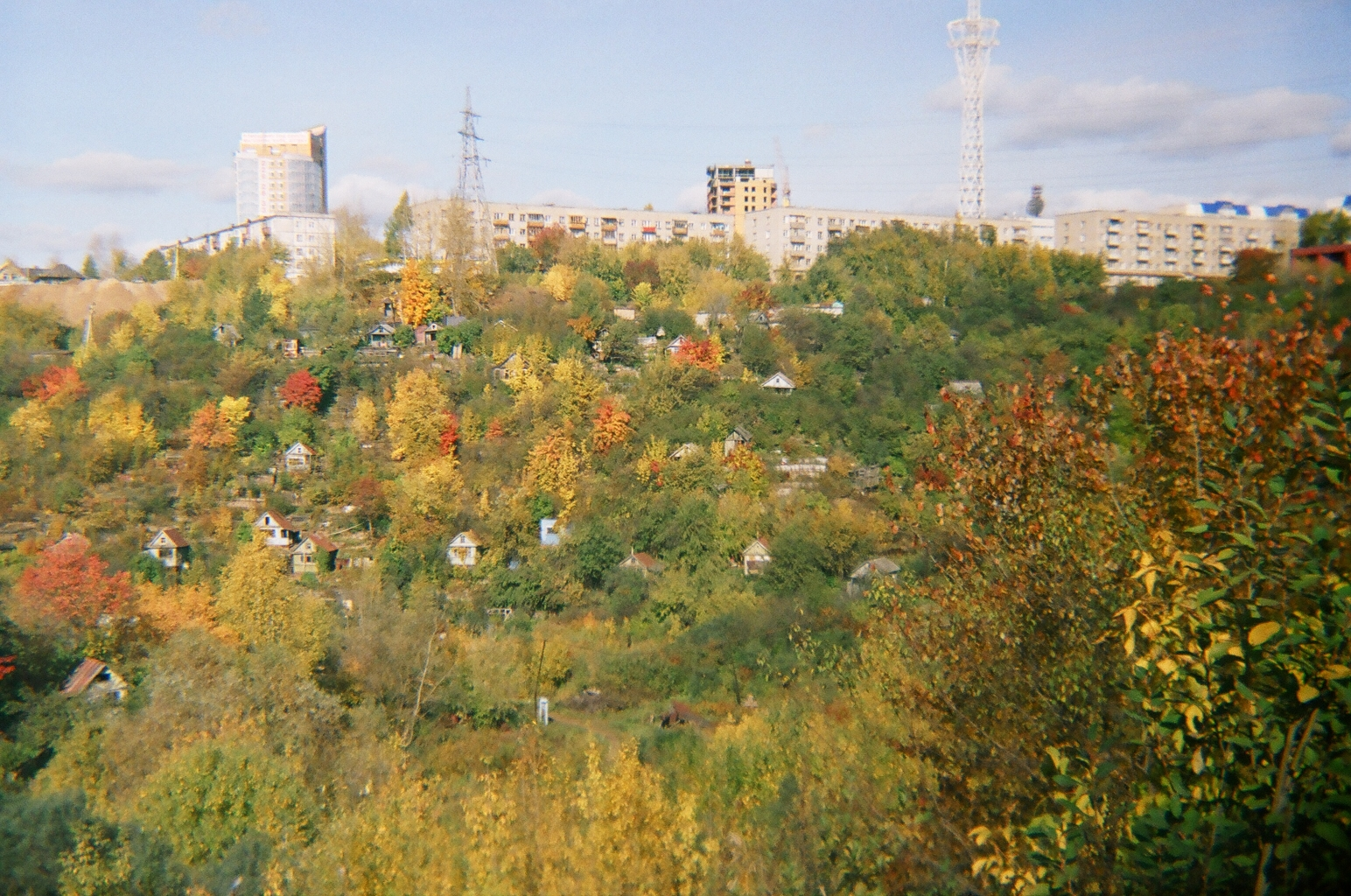
The slope of Yegoshikha Ravine

The Yegoshikha (Russian: Егоши́ха, IPA: [jɪɡəˈʂɨxə]), formerly Yagoshikha (Russian: Ягоши́ха), is a river in Perm Krai, Russia, being the left tributary of the Kama. In spite of its relatively small size it is famous for its historical significance. It mainly flows across Sverdlovsky City District of the city of Perm and along the border of Motovilikhinsky City District. The source of the Yegoshikha river is in the forest area close to Lipovaya Gora and Vladimirskiy microdistricts. The river flows along the Yegoshikha ravine, which divides the left-bank (relatively to Kama) part of Perm city and is crossed by two dams and a bridge (which is also called a dam by the general population). On the banks of Yegoshikha there are a lot of country cottages, The South Cemetery and The Yegoshikha (Old) Cemetery. The Yegoshikha flows into the Kama close to Perm's river port.

== Tributaries ==
- Ivanovka
- Styx

== History ==
The Yegoshikha rivers history has the earliest mention of a settlement in the territory of Perm city, being first described in the Prokopiy Elizarov census book in 1647. This settlement was later referred to as Yegoshikha Village. In 1723, after copper deposits were discovered there, the Yegoshikha Copper Factory was founded on its banks by Vasily Tatishchev, who was the then Chief Manager of all of the factories in the Ural region. The workers' settlement later became the foundation of the city of Perm.

== Ecology ==
The Yegoshikha runs along the borders of Perm city close to several industrial complexes and is being contaminated by industrial waste. In 1981, the Yegoshikha river was added to the list of Perm Region's small rivers which require water protection legislation.
