= Alexander Bukirev =

Soviet ichthyologist

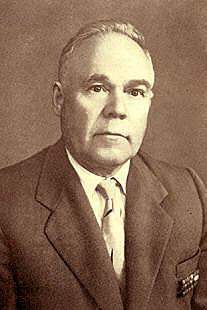
- Born: Alexander Ilyich Bukirev; 12 September 1903; Verkhmochki, Kungursky Uyezd, Perm Governorate, Russian Empire
- Died: 26 August 1964 (aged 60); Perm, Soviet Union
- Education: Perm University
- Scientific career
- Fields: Ichthyology
- Workplaces: Perm University

Alexander Ilyich Bukirev (12 September 1903 – 26 August 1964) was a Soviet ichthyologist, professor, rector (from 1939 to 1941 and from 1946 to 1951), the Dean of the Faculty of Biology (from 1955 to 1956) of Perm State University. He founded a scientific direction in ichthyology that studied fish resources, fish variability, and patterns of formation of the fish fauna of the Kama reservoir.

== Biography ==
Bukirev was born in Verkhmochki, a village located in, Perm Governorate, Kungursky Uyezd, in the then-Russian Empire. He was born to a peasant family. In 1922, he joined the Workers’ Faculty of Perm University and graduated in 1925. Around that time, he was drafted to the Red Army. In 1927, he rejoined Perm University, but in 1929, the Perm City Committee decided to send him to work as the executive secretary of the Perm City Council. He graduated from the Biology Department of the Perm Pedagogical Institute in 1931. He worked as a researcher and secretary at the Biological Research Institute of Perm University and as an assistant at the Department of Vertebrate Zoology.

Bukirev and his colleagues organized and successfully carried out two ichthyological expeditions along the Upper and Middle Kama, the results of which were published in a monograph titled "Fish and Fishing of the upper riverheads of the Kama River" in 1934.

In 1939, Bukirev participated in the battles of Khalkhin Gol and was wounded. In June 1940, he was appointed rector of Perm University, and from this post, he joined the army as a volunteer. Between 1941 and 1945, he served in the Second World War as the head of an artillery battalion. During that time, he developed a method of fighting the German Tiger II tank. The results of his study were published in the brochure titled "The German Tiger heavy Tank and the fight against it."

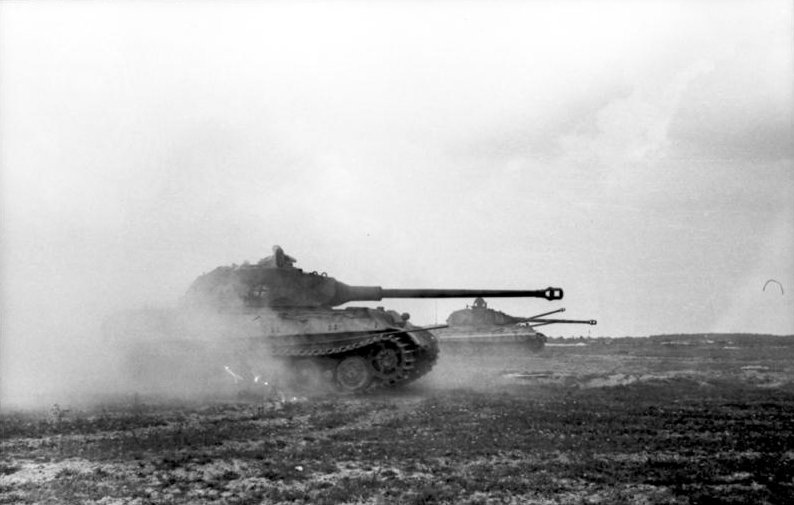
Tiger II, Königstiger

From 1946 to 1951, he served as a rector at Perm University. In 1951, he became an associate professor at the Department of Vertebrate Zoology. From 1955 to 1956, he served as dean of the Faculty of Biology. In 1962, he was awarded the academic title of Professor.

Bukirev was one of the founders of the direction in ichthyology at Perm University that focused on the study of fish resources and fish variability. He discovered previously unknown brook trout in the Middle Kama. Moreover, he published 20 scientific papers. Bukirev systematized the fish of the river Upper Kama, several other lakes, and the river Irtysh.

== Public Activity ==
- Deputy of the Perm Oblast, City and District Councils.
- Chairman of the Soviet Peace Committee.
- Founding member of the educational and propaganda organization “Znanie”.

== Recognition ==
A street in Perm is named after Alexander Bukirev.

== Awards ==
- Order of Lenin
- Order of the Red Banner
- Order of Kutuzov
- Order of the Patriotic War
- Order of the Red Star
- Medal "For the Victory over Germany in the Great Patriotic War 1941–1945"
- Medal "For the Capture of Berlin"
- Medal "For the Liberation of Prague"

| Preceded by Maria Prokhorova | Rector of Perm University; 1940–1941 | Succeeded by Roman Mertslin |
| Preceded by Roman Mertslin | Rector of Perm University; 1945–19511 | Succeeded by Vasily Tiunov |
