= Viktor Zhivopistsev =

Soviet chemist

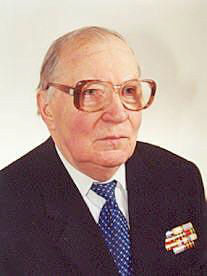
- Born: Viktor Petrovich Zhivopistsev; September 22, 1915; Sabarka village, Perm Governorate
- Died: October 22, 2006 (aged 91); Perm, Russia
- Education: Doctor of Chemical Sciences
- Alma mater: Perm University
- Scientific career
- Fields: Chemistry
- Workplaces: Perm University

Viktor Petrovich Zhivopistsev (Russian: Ви́ктор Петро́вич Живопи́сцев; 22 September 1915 – 22 October 2006) was a Soviet and Russian chemist. Honored Scientist of the RSFSR (1973).

== Biography ==
Zhivopistsev was born on 22 September 1915 in the village Sabarka in Suksunsky District of Perm Oblast (now — Perm Krai). After graduating with honours from the Okhansk Pedagogical College in 1933, he entered the Department of Chemistry of Perm State University and graduated in 1938. After that he stayed at university and worked as an assistant at the Department of Analytical Chemistry.

He fought in the Great Patriotic War and managed to build a career in the army from the rank of a soldier of 32nd Combat Engineer Battalion to the head of the chemical laboratory of the 1st Far Eastern Front.

After the war, he returned to teacher's and scientific work. In 1951, he defended his Ph.D. thesis. In 1952, he was transferred to the position of an associate professor of the Department of Organic Chemistry. In 1965, he was one of the first people at university who defended the doctoral thesis at Perm University and was elected Professor of the Department of Organic Chemistry.

From 1967 to 1989, he was working as the Head of the Department of Analytical Chemistry of Perm State University.

From July 1970 to 12 March 1987, Zhivopistsev held the position of a rector of Perm State University and a chairman of the Council of Rectors of Perm Universities. He was also a member of the Scientific Council of the Analytical Chemistry of the Academy of Sciences of the USSR. In 1971, he was a delegate at the 24th Congress of the Communist Party of the Soviet Union, and at the XVI Congress of Trade Unions of the USSR in 1977. He was a member of the Perm Regional Committee of the CPSU several times.

He died on 22 October 2006 in Perm.

== Scientific and organizational activities ==
Zhivopistsev's research interests were focused on the concept of "purposeful synthesis of new organic compounds and the study of their complexion with inorganic ions and the introduction into practice of the synthesized compounds in inorganic analysis". One more interest was the research of chemical reagents called pyrazolones, and the possibilities for their implementation. Perm School of Analysts, headed by Zhivopistsev, had become well-known all over the country.

Zhivopistsev was an initiator and the first scientific director of the laboratory of organic reagents which was opened in January 1973 at the Department of Analytical Chemistry.

Zhivopistsev had published more than 300 scientific articles and received 56 copyright certificates for inventions. In the co-authorship with E. A. Selezneva at "Nauka" Publishing House he was able to publish a monograph "Analytical chemistry of zinc" in 1975. Under his leadership, approximately 25 Candidates of Sciences and 2 Doctors of Sciences had been trained and nurtured.

Through the initiative of a rector Zhivopistsev, the Museum of the History of the Perm University was established (Order No. 3 of January 6, 1973).

In the history of Perm State University, Zhivopistsev went down as a "Rector The Builder". During the 17 years of his work as a rector (1970–1987), the university's educational, scientific and production areas facilities had more than doubled. Under his leadership, a chemistry department building (No. 6), a Student House of Culture (building No. 7), an economic department building (building No. 12), a two-hall sports building (No. 10), and four student dormitories (№ 2, 5, 6, 7), a ski base, a canteen with 530 seats (today it is the building No. 9, used as a building for the Department of Law), a dispensary, were built.

== Awards and medals ==
for military services

- Order of the Patriotic War, 2nd degree
- Medal "For the Victory over Germany in the Great Patriotic War 1941–1945"
- Medal "For the Victory over Japan"

for services to the state and society

- Order of the Red Banner of Labour
- Order of Friendship of Peoples
- Order of the Badge of Honour
- Medal "For Distinguished Labour"
- awarded the badge "Honorary Worker of Higher Professional Education of the Russian Federation"

== Memorial ==
- On 22 October 2010 a memorial plaque has been unveiled on the facade of the Chemistry Faculty Building of the Perm State University.

Preceded by Fyodor Gorovoy	Rector of the Perm State University; 1970–1987	Succeeded by Vladimir Malanin
