= Igor Makarikhin =

Russian physicist

Makarikhin, Igor Yuryevich
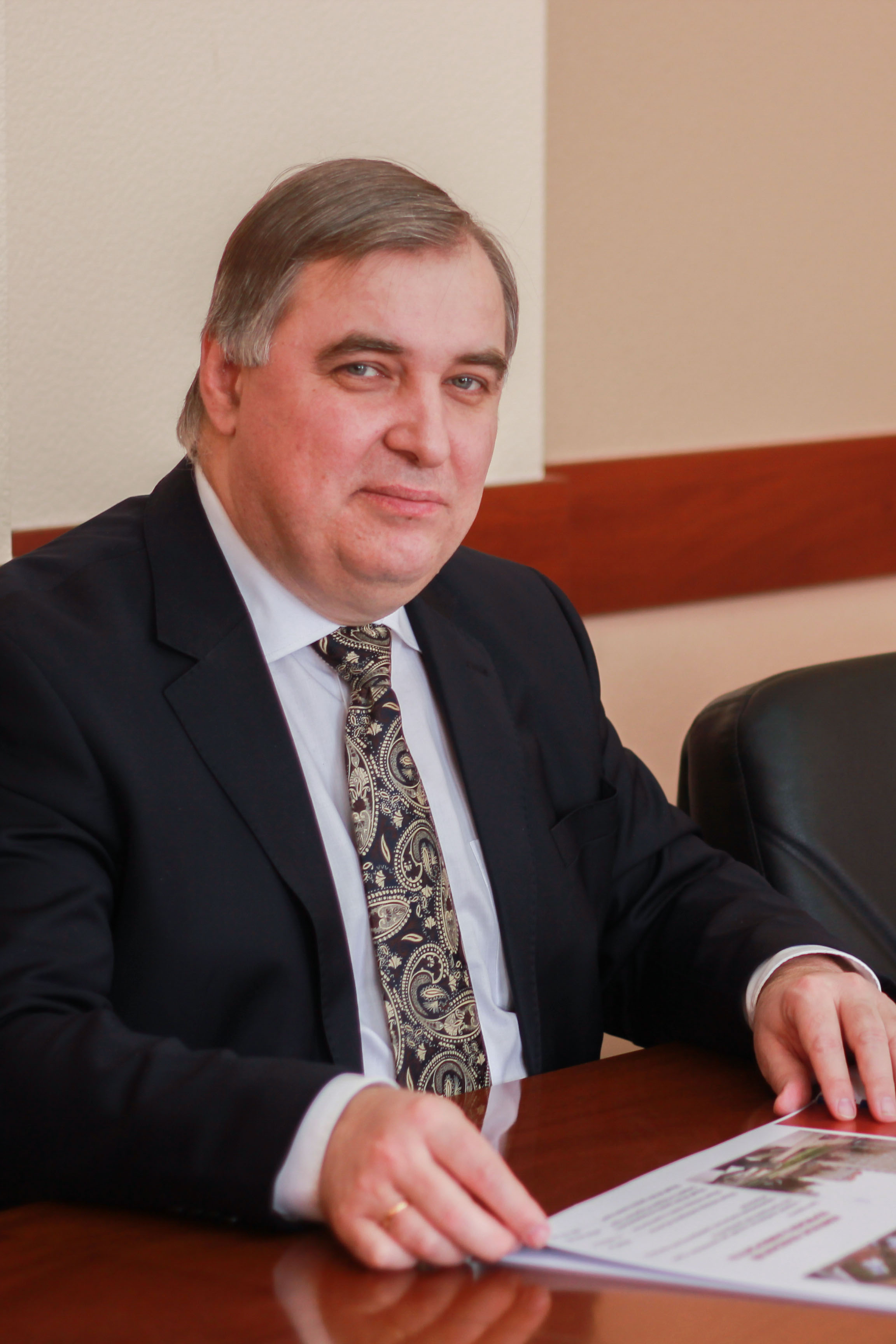
- Born: June 18, 1964 (age 61); Perm Russian Soviet Federative Socialist Republic
- Education: Doctor of Physical and Mathematical Sciences
- Alma mater: Perm University
- Awards: Honorary Employee of Higher Professional Education of the Russian Federation
- Scientific career
- Fields: Physics
- Institutions: Perm University
- Patrons: E. L. Tarunin
- Website: I. Y. Makarikhin., Rectorate of PSU(in russian)

Igor Yuryevich Makarikhin (born 18 June 1964, Perm) is a Russian Physicist, Doctor of Physics and Mathematics, who achieved the positions of a professor, a vice-rector of Academic Affairs (2002–2010), was a rector of Perm University.

== Biography ==
Makarikhin graduated from Alexander Pushkin School No. 9 in Perm (Physics and Mathematics School) (1981) and the Faculty of Physics of Perm University (1986).

From 1985 to 1988, he was working as an engineer, from 1988 to 1995, as an assistant of the Department of General Physics of Perm University. From 1986 to 1988, he pursued the Postgraduate studies at the Department of General Physics.

Since 1996, he has been the Head of the Computer Network Informatization Department of the PSU ICC, since 1997, a university professor of Perm University of the Faculty of Physics.

From 1997 to 1999, he was a program coordinator of Open Society Institute (Soros Foundation) in Perm Krai.

From 1998 to 2002, he was the leader of the Educational and Methodological Department of Perm University

Concurrently, from 1999 to 2000, he was working as a leading programmer of the Department of Information and Computing Systems of the ICS PSU, since 2000 — as a senior professor and, from 2000 to 2011, — Associate professor as an Associate Professor of the Department of General Physics. In 2000, he defended his thesis titled "Electroconvective instability of flows of a weakly conducting liquid in a vertical capacitor" and was awarded the rank of Candidate of Physical and Mathematical Sciences.

Starting from May 2002, he was appointed Vice-Rector for Academic Affairs of Perm University.

On 6 May 2010 he defended his doctoral thesis "Dissipative structures and non-stationary processes in interphase hydrodynamics" at the Institute of Continuous Media Mechanics Russian Academy of Sciences Ural Branch.

Later, on 26 May 2010, he was elected the rector of Perm University at the conference of scientific and pedagogical workers and representatives of other categories of workers and students; Re-elected in 2015. Currently, he is also a Professor of the Department of General Physics of PSU. Since July 2020, he has been working as an Advisor to the Rector of PSU.

On 7 April 2014, Makarikhin initiated the Endowment Fund of Perm University was created.

In 2021, he stood in the election as an independent candidate in District No. 11 in 2021 Russian regional elections in Perm City Duma, won about 15% of the votes.

== Organizational and administrative activities ==
From 1996 to 2002, Makarikhin was one of the creators of the University Internet Center (UIC).

From 2003 to 2006, he led the creation of an automated educational process management system, which was a part of the unified teleinformation system of the university.

In 2004, Makarikhin was one of the creators of the concept of the University Stabilization Fund, which helped significantly to increase the salaries of academic staff and educational support staff of PSU.

From 2005 to 2006, he was a Deputy Director of the training centre of the Federation of Internet Education of the university and supervised the creation of the technical and information infrastructure of the centre.

Makarikhin was one of the head developers of an application form of Perm University's participation in the national competition among universities for innovative training. Moreover, he was the deputy director of the university directorate for the implementation of the national project of an innovative educational program of Perm State University (PSU). Since 2010 he has been the head of the development program of the National Research University in PSU.

In addition, he holds the positions of a Chairman of the Academic Senate of the PSU, a member of the Academic Council of the Faculty of Physics of PSU, member of the Public Council at the Main Directorate Ministry of Internal Affairs by Perm Krai and a member of the Thesis Counselling of Physical and Mathematical sciences.

Since 2012, he has been a member of the Perm Krai Government Council that chooses scientific projects realizing by international research groups of scientists on the basis of state higher vocational education institutions and (or) scientific organizations of Perm Krai. The Council gives subsidies (grants) to business entities which are registered in Perm Krai, the founders should be higher educational institutions and (or) scientific organizations of Perm Krai.

Furthermore, Makarikhin is the Head of the Organizing Committee of a trans-regional multi-subject academic competition "The Young Talents" which is for schoolchildren.

== Educational and scientific activities ==
Makarikhin gave lectures, practical classes, laboratory practicals in the course units of the disciplines "Physics" and "General Physics" for students of the Faculty of Mechanics and Mathematics, Geography, Biology, and Physics. In addition, he holds the basic course "Optics" and special courses "Laser measuring systems in hydrodynamics" and "Microhydrodynamics" for students of the Faculty of Physics at university. He supervised eighteen diploma and graduation qualification theses of students of the Faculty of Physics (specialization "Physical Hydrodynamics").

Makarikhin conducts his scientific research in the field of fluid, gas, and plasma mechanics. The main topics of Makarikhin's research are electro hydrodynamic flows and interphase and capillary phenomena, as well as a research in the field of information technology application in the area of education.

Makarikhin has published over 50 articles in the international, central, and local press, presented reports at All-Russian conferences. He administered four grants. Moreover, he participated in the performance of contractual research works on 15 topics. In 2010, he became a laureate of Perm University for the best work in the field of physical and mathematical sciences.

== Scientific activity ==
=== Textbooks and monographs ===
- "Bratukhin Y. K., Makarov S. O., Makarikhin I. Y., Putin G. F." Hydrodynamic phenomena at the boundaries of the phase separation: a textbook // Perm: Publishing House of PSU, 2003. 76 p.
- "Makarikhin I. Y." Dissipative structures and unsteady processes in interphase hydrodynamics / Perm State University. Perm, 2009. 338 p.

=== Articles ===
- Makarikhin I. Yu. Effect of electric field on the stability of convective flow in vertical layer // Proc. of 2 Int. Conf. On Nonlinear Mechanics, Beijing, China, August 23–26, 1993, P. 384—386.
- Makarikhin I. Yu. Effect of electric field on viscous fluid flows // Abs. of the IUTAM Symp. On Numerical Simulation of Nonisothermal Flow of Viscoelastic Liquids, Rolduc Abbey Kerkrade, Netherlands, November 1–3, 1993.
- "Makarikhin I. Y." On the influence of the electric field on the stability of convective flow in a vertical-cavity // Izvestiya RAS, series Mechanics of liquid and gas. 1994. No. 4. P. 35-41.
- "Berezhnov V. V., Bratukhin Y. K., Makarikhin I. Y., Makarov S. O." The occurrence of sound vibrations during steam condensation in an acoustic resonator // Letters in ZhTF. 1994. Vol. 20. P. 77-79.
- "Makarikhin I. Y." On some features of the disturbance spectrum of electroconductive stationary flow // Bulletin of Perm. un. Series "Physics". Perm. 1995. Issue 4. P. 62-71.
- "Bratukhin Y., Kosvintsev S., Makarikhin I., Makarov S., Meseguer J., Putin G., Rivas D". Self-oscillation in the liquid model under Plateau-technique conditions // Abs. Of the 9 European Symp. «Gravity-dependent phenomena in Physical». Berlin, May 2–5, 1995, P.172.
- Kosvintsev S. R., Makarikhin I. Y., Zhdanov S. A., Velarde M. G. Electroconvective instability in a vertical capacitor // Proc. of 2 Int. Conf. on Dielectric Liquids, Nara, Japan, July 20–25, 1999, P.37-40.
- "Zhdanov S. A., Kosvintsev S. R., Makarikhin I. Y." The influence of the electric field on the stability of the thermogravitational flow in a vertical capacitor // ZhETF. 2000. Vol. 117. Issue. 2. P. 398-406.
- "Kostitsyn V. I., Ilaltdinov I. Ya., Makarikhin I. Y., Tsiberkin N. G. " Features of the implementation of new state educational standards // Vestnik Perm. un., the series "University education". Perm. 2000. Issue 4. p. 173-177.
- "Malanin V. V., |Suslonov V. M., Makarikhin I. Y." Information technologies and organization of the educational process at Perm State University in modern conditions // Bulletin of Perm University. Information Systems and Technologies series. Perm. 2001. Issue 5. p. 5-10.
- Kosvintsev S. R., Makarikhin I. Y., Zhdanov S. A., Velarde M. G. Electric field effects on the stability of a thermogravitational flow in a vertical capacitor // Journal of Electrostatics, Volume 56, Issue 4, November 2002, P. 493–513.
- "Bratukhin Y., Makarikhin I., Makarov S." Effect of Linear Tension on Stability of Small Floating Drop // Second Int. Workshop «Two-Phase Systems for Ground and Space Applications». 26-28 Oct. 2007, Kyoto, Japan. Proc. In «Microgravity Science and Technology Journal». Vol. XIX, Iss. 3–4. 2007. P. 87–89.
- "Malanin V. V., Makarikhin I. Y., Henner E. K." Formation of information and communication competence of graduates of a classical university in accordance with the needs of the information society, // Bulletin of Perm University. The University Education series. Issue 6(11). 2007. p. 25-32.
- "Makarikhin I. Y., Smorodin B. L., Shatrova E. F." On the drift of balls in a rotating liquid // Izvestiya RAS, series Mechanics of liquid and gas. 2008. No. 4. p. 6-15.
- "Makarikhin I. Y., Rybkin K. A." Final stages of bubble collapse // Izvestiya RAS, series Mechanics of liquid and gas. 2009. No. 3. p. 137-142.
- "Makarikhin I. Y." "Deadly" over-efficiency of Russian education // Bulletin of Perm University. The series "University education". Issue 6(32). 2009. p. 25-33.
- "Makarikhin I. Y., Henner E. K." The concept of an intelligent information system for supporting the information educational environment of an innovative university // Scientific Notes of IIO RAO. 2009. No. 30. p. 24-28.
- "Makarikhin I. Y., Makarov S. O., Rybkin K. A.". Remarks on the drop falling on the free surface of another liquid // Izvestiya RAS, series Mechanics of liquid and gas. 2010. No. 1. p. 40-44.
- "Makarikhin I. Y., Makarikhina O. M., Makarov S. O., Rybkin K. A." On meandering of jets flowing down an inclined plane// Izvestiya RAS, series Mechanics of liquid and gas. 2010. No. 4. p. 35-42.
- "Rubtsova E., Kuyukina M., Ivshina I., Kazakov A., Makarikhin I". Adhesion of hydrophobic Rhodococcus bacteria to the hexadecane-water interface. Abstracts of the 24th Conference of the European Colloid and Interface Society, Prague, Czech Republic, 05-10 September 2010. P6.30.
- "Bratukhin Y. K., Makarikhin I. Y., Makarov S. O., Rybkin K. A." Gravitational drift of ellipsoids in a viscous liquid // /Izvestiya RAS, series Mechanics of liquid and gas. 2011. No. 5. p. 52-64.
- "Makarikhin I. Y., Kataev V. N." 3D format: think, do, achieve // Accreditation in education. 2013. No. 6 (66). p. 52-53.
- "Otroshchenko A. A., Makarikhin I. Y." Investigation of droplet formation processes in the channel of a microfluidic device by the method of hydrodynamic focusing // Bulletin of Perm University. Series: Physics. 2013 No. 3 (25). p. 24-27.

== Awards ==
- Honorary Employee of Higher Professional Education of the Russian Federation.
- Certificate of Honor of the Ministry of Education of the Perm Krai.
- Commendation of the Minister of Sports of the Russian Federation.

== Links ==
- 36 employees of PSU were awarded honorary titles and awards // New Companion. 24 Aug 2016.
- Igor Makarikhin // Business Class Newsletter.
- Igor Yuryevich Makarikhin, rector of PSU // Publishing house "Leisure" (in Russian).
- Makarikhin Igor Yuryevich // Globalperm.ru (in Russian).
- Makarikhin Igor Yuryevich // PSU (in Russian).
- Makarikhin Igor Yuryevich // Encyclopedia "Famous scientists" (in Russian).
- Makarikhin Igor Yuryevich // Encyclopedia of the Urals (in Russian).
- Igor Makarikhin was elected Rector of Perm University // "Studencheskaya Pravda" (in Russian).
- Perm University elected a new rector // ProPerm. 2010.05.26.
- Igor Yu. Makarikhin // ResearchGate.

Preceded by Vladimir Malanin	Rector of Perm University; 2010–2020	Succeeded by Dmitry Krasilnikov
