= Pokrovsky =

Pokrovsky, also spelled Pokrovski and Pokrovskii (Russian: Покровский), or Pokrovskaya (feminine; Покровская) is a Russian clerical surname derived from Pokrov, either from the feast of Покров Пресвятой Богородицы (Intercession of the Theotokos) or from any of Porkov churches or monasteries.

Notable people with the surname include:

- Alexander Pokrovsky (1898–1979), Soviet military leader
- Anatoly Pokrovsky (1930–2022), Russian vascular surgeon
- Boris Pokrovsky (1912–2009), former chief director of the Bolshoi Theater and founder of the Moscow Chamber Opera Theater
- Dmitry Pokrovsky (born 1987) – head RSM.
- Dmitri Pokrovsky (1944–1996), Russian musician
- Georgy Pokrovsky (1901–1979), Soviet physicist
- Igor Pokrovsky (1926–2002), Soviet architect
- Ksenia Pokrovsky (1942–2013), Russian-American icon painter
- Konstantin Pokrovsky (1868–1944), Russian and Ukrainian astronomer
- Maksim Pokrovsky (born 1968), Russian musician
- Mikhail Nikolayevich Pokrovsky (1868–1932), Soviet historian and academic
- Mikhail Pokrovsky (linguist) (1869–1942), Russian/Soviet linguist, literary critic, and academic
- Nikolai Pokrovsky (1865–1930), last foreign minister of the Russian Empire
- Nikolai Pokrovsky (actor) (1896–1961), Soviet actor, theater director, and People's Artist of the USSR
- Valery Pokrovsky (born 1931), Russian physicist
- Victor Pokrovsky (1897–1990), Russian choir director, translator, and music arranger
- Viktor Pokrovsky (1889–1922), Russian lieutenant general
- Vladimir Pokrovsky (architect) (1871–1931?), Russian architect
- Vladimir Pokrovsky (pilot) (1918–1998), Soviet aircraft pilot and Hero of the Soviet Union
