= Konstantin Pokrovsky =

Russian astronomer (1868–1944)

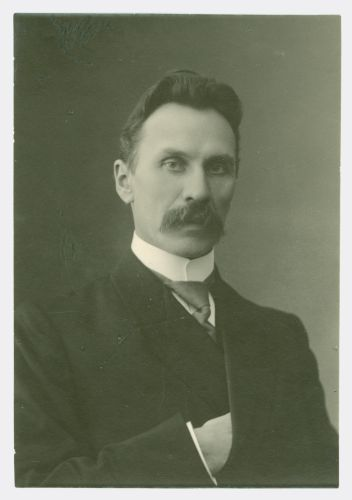
- Konstantin Pokrovski
- Born: May 23, 1868; Nizhny Novgorod, Russian Empire.
- Died: 5 November 1944 (aged 76); Kyiv, Ukrainian Soviet Socialist Republic, Soviet Union
- Education: Imperial Moscow University, Physics and Mathematics Faculty (1891)
- Scientific career
- Fields: Astronomy
- Workplaces: Imperial Moscow University, Imperial Dorpat University, Perm State University, Odessa University
- Notable students: Grigory Shajn

Konstantin Dorimedontovich Pokrovsky (11 (23) May 1868, Nizhny Novgorod — 5 November 1944, Kiev) was a Soviet astronomer, corresponding member of the Academy of Sciences of the Soviet Union, and Professor. He was a rector of the Perm Branch of the Imperial Petrograd University (1916–1917), and the first rector of Perm State University (1917–1918).

== Biography ==
Konstantin Dorimedontovich Pokrovsky was born on the 11th (23rd) of May, 1868, in Nizhny Novgorod into the family of a priest. He graduated from Nizhny Novgorod men's gymnasium. In 1891 he graduated from the Mathematical Department of the Physics and Mathematics Faculty of the Imperial Moscow University with a 1st degree diploma.

From 1890 to 1895, he was the head of the public Private Observatory of the F. Shvabe in Moscow. In 1896, he was appointed to the position of a practicing astronomer at Yuriev University. He was a member of the first scientific astronomical society in Russia — the Nizhny Novgorod Physics and Astronomy enthusiasts.

In 1902, he defended his thesis for a master's degree in astronomy on "The origin of periodic comets". In November 1915, after defending his thesis on "The structure of the tail of the 1910 comet", Pokrovsky received a doctorate in astronomy and geodesy from Moscow University. After the establishment of the University in Perm in 1916, he was elected as its rector. He served in this position from July 1, 1916 to May 29, 1918.

In 1920, he was elected to the position of a senior astronomer of the Pulkovo Astronomical Observatory in Pulkovo, as well as a senior head of the military geodesic Department of the Moscow Land Survey Institute.

In January 1927, Pokrovsky was elected as a corresponding member of the Academy of Sciences of the Soviet Union. From 1930 to 1932, he worked as a deputy director of the Pulkovo Observatory. He was repeatedly elected as a chairman of the Council of the Association of Astronomers of the RSFSR.

Since 1933, Pokrovsky was a Chairman of the Odessa branch of the All-Union Astronomical and Geodetic Society. He was also elected as a Chairman of the Commission for the construction of a planetariums in Ukraine under the Academy of Sciences of the Ukrainian SSR.

Since September 1934, he was the director of the Astronomical Observatory of the Odessa State University. He was the head of the Department of Astronomy (since 1934), as well as the Dean of the Faculty of Physics and Mathematics of OSU (1937–1938).

Pokrovsky could not evacuate at the beginning of World War II because of his age (in 1941 he was 73 years old) and because of his wife's illness. In 1942 Pokrovsky headed a delegation of scientists and pedagogs from Odessa to Bucharest, where they met with the widow of Ion Inculet, Roxana Basota- Cantacuzino. She victualed him with medicaments, as well provided teaching matters and Astronomic scientific journal for the Astronomic Observatory of Odessa

On May 11, 1944, Pokrovsky was arrested by the UNKGB department for the Odessa region under the article 54-1a of the Criminal Code of the Ukrainian SSR (High treason). In the arrest warrant, the main charge was that Pokrovsky had read a lecture entitled "The destruction of the Pulkovo Observatory by the Bolsheviks". During the interrogations, K. D. Pokrovsky did not admit his guilt, and considered the lecture objective. He was in prison No. 1 of the NKVD of the Kiev region. He died in the prison hospital on November 5, 1944.

== Scientific activity ==
K. D. Pokrovsky developed methods of celestial mechanics for determining the orbits of cloud formations in comet tails. He was an active teacher and popularizer of astronomical knowledge. He also gave popular science lectures in many cities of the country. His book Guide to the Sky, first published in Moscow in 1894, has had four editions and received the prize named after Emperors Peter the Great and Nicholas II, and the book Star Atlas, published in St. Petersburg, brought him worldwide fame. He is the author of textbooks on cosmography for middle schools and textbooks on practical astronomy for universities.

== Sources ==
- Birshtein A. Pokrovsky Konstantin Dormidontovich (1868–1944) // They left a mark on the history of Odessa. Odessa Biographical Reference book.
- Pokrovsky Konstantin Dorimedontovich / / Encyclopedia "Perm Krai".
- Publications of K. D. Pokrovsky in the alphabetical catalog of the National Library of Moscow State University
- "Professors of the Perm State University: (1916-2001) // Kostitsyn V. I., Oshurkova R. A., Stabrovsky A. S." Pokrovsky Konstantin Dorimedontovich / Main ed.: V. V. Malanin. Perm: Perm State University Press, 2001. 279 p. P. 95–96.
- Pokrovsky Konstantin Dorimedontovich / / Kostitsyn V. I. Rectors of the Perm University. 1916-2016. 3rd Ed., reprint. and add./ V. I. Kostitsyn. Perm State University, Perm, 2016. 352 p. P. 23–35.
- Pokrovsky Konstantin Dorimedontovich / Ukrainian astronomical portal.
