= Nikolai Kultashev =

Russian chemist (1874–1948)

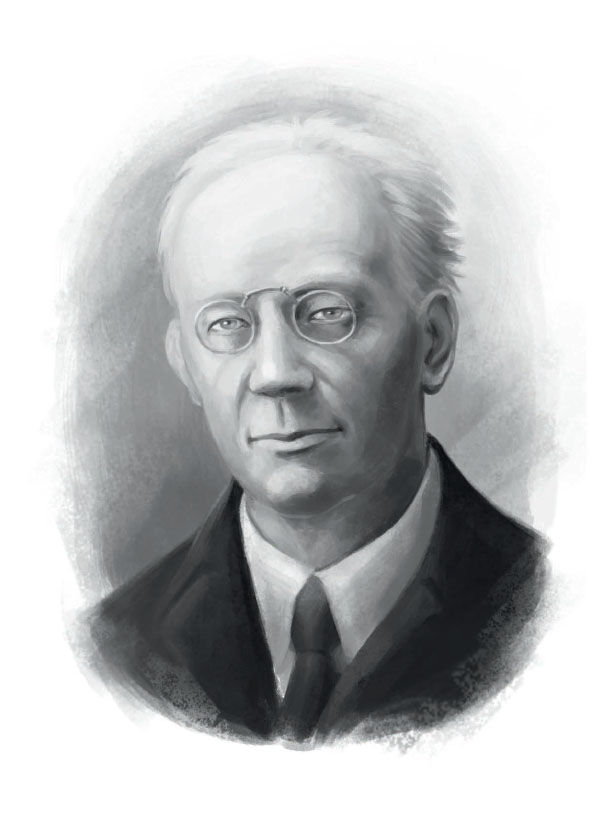
- Born: June 25, 1874; Narva, Governorate of Livonia, Russian Empire.
- Died: 1948 (aged 73–74)
- Education: Imperial University of Dorpat
- Scientific career
- Fields: Chemistry, inorganic chemistry, physical chemistry
- Workplaces: Imperial University of Dorpat, Perm State University, Tomsk State University, Voronezh State University

Nikolai Viktorovich Kultashev (Russian: Никола́й Ви́кторович Култа́шев; June 25 (13), 1874 — 1948) was a Russian and Soviet chemist, Doctor of Chemical Sciences, Rector (1918–1919), Dean of the Faculty of Physics and Mathematics (1917–1919) of Perm State University, Professor of Tomsk and Voronezh Universities.

== Biography ==
He was born in the family of a hereditary nobleman. In 1892 he graduated from the gymnasium in Yuryev, 1897 — from the Yuriev University with a PhD in Chemistry, presenting the work "Changes in the volumes of mineral crystals during melting".

Since 1898, he was an assistant to the mineralogical cabinet of the Yuriev University with the rank of collegiate secretary. After passing the exams for the master's degree in chemistry (1902) and defending his dissertation, he was elected as a privat-docent at the Department of Chemistry of Yuriev University (1904), transferred to the position of assistant director of the chemical laboratory. From 1911 he was a collegiate councilor. In 1916, after defending his dissertation on "The influence of pressure on the melting curves of binary mixtures", he was awarded a master's degree in chemistry.

In 1916, he was sent by the Ministry of Public Education to Perm (then to the Perm Branch of the Petrograd University). N. V. Kultashev also became the organizer of the Department of Inorganic and Analytical Chemistry, which gave rise to the two largest departments of the future Perm State University — the Department of Inorganic and the Department of Analytical Chemistry.

On July 1, 1917, he was appointed acting ordinary professor at Perm State University. On October 3, 1917, Kultashev was elected Dean of the Faculty of Physics and Mathematics of Perm State University. On May 20, 1918, he was re-elected to this position, but remained in it for only 9 days, handing it over to A. A. Richter.

On May 29, 1918, he was elected Rector of Perm State University, but was dismissed from this position due to illness and his departure to Tomsk in the summer of 1919. On June 28, 1919, by a special order, he transferred the duties of Rector to A. S. Bezikovich.

Officially, from 1920 to 1923, N. V. Kultashev was still on a business trip to Tomsk University. Further, by telegram, he expressed a desire to resume his service at the Perm University, but he never arrived in Perm, after which he was officially dismissed from the PSU on December 19, 1923.

Since February 22, 1920 he has been a privat-docent and the Head of the Laboratory of Inorganic Chemistry of Tomsk Technological Institute. He lectured on inorganic and physical chemistry. In March 1924, he was appointed professor of the Department of Inorganic Chemistry. Conducted research in the field of chemistry on behalf of Siburalproekt.

At the same time, since October 1919, Kultashev has been a privat-docent, then a professor of the Department of Inorganic Chemistry at Tomsk University and the head of the analytical laboratory. He taught a course in analytical chemistry to students of the Natural Sciences Department of the Faculty of Physics and Mathematics. In 1924, N. V. Kultashev moved to Voronezh, where from 1932 he headed the Department of Inorganic and Physical Chemistry of the Natural Department of the Pedagogical Faculty of Voronezh University.

During this period of time, the department begins to study the physical and chemical properties of aqueous and non-aqueous solutions, the conditions of electrolytic deposition of metals, it is also engaged in the creation and study of fine-pored metal membranes. In the late 1930s, under his leadership, the department began to conduct research on the electrochemical and corrosion behavior of metals.

In 1928, he participated in the V. Mendeleev Congress, where he made presentations on experimental research.

In 1938, N. V. Kultashev was arrested together with a group of teachers of Voronezh universities by the NKVD for allegedly anti-Soviet activities. He was credited with participating in an anti-Soviet conspiracy, sabotage, and counter-revolutionary activities. For about two years, he was in the position of the accused, having been in prison for 16 months.

In 1939, he was fully acquitted by the military tribunal of the 30th OrVo (Orel Military District) Rifle Corps.

In 1940, for scientific achievements in the field of physical chemistry, N. V. Kultashev was awarded the degree of Doctor of Chemical Sciences without defending his dissertation.

According to Voronezh colleagues, N. V. Kultashev was distinguished by a huge erudition, in addition, he spoke several foreign languages.

== Sources ==
- Kostitsin V. I., Oshurkova R. A. Kultashev Nikolay Viktorovich / Ed.: V. V. Malanin. Perm: Perm State University Publishing House, 2001, pp. 115–116.
- Kostitsin V. I. // Kostitsyn V. I. Rectors of the Perm State University. 1916–2006. 2nd Ed., reprint. and add. / Perm State University. Perm, 2006. 352 p. P. 32––4.
- Kultashev Nikolay Viktorovich // Professors of the Tomsk Polytechnic University: Volume 1. / Author and comp. A.V. Gagarin. Tomsk: Publishing House of Scientific and Technical literature, 2000. p. 300, p. 123–124.
- Kultashev Nikolay Viktorovich / / Chemical Faculty of the Voronezh State University.
- Kultashev Nikolay Viktorovich / / Electronic Encyclopedia of TPU.
