= Dmitry Krasilnikov (political science) =

Russian politologist (born 1971)

Dmitri Georgievich Krasilnikov
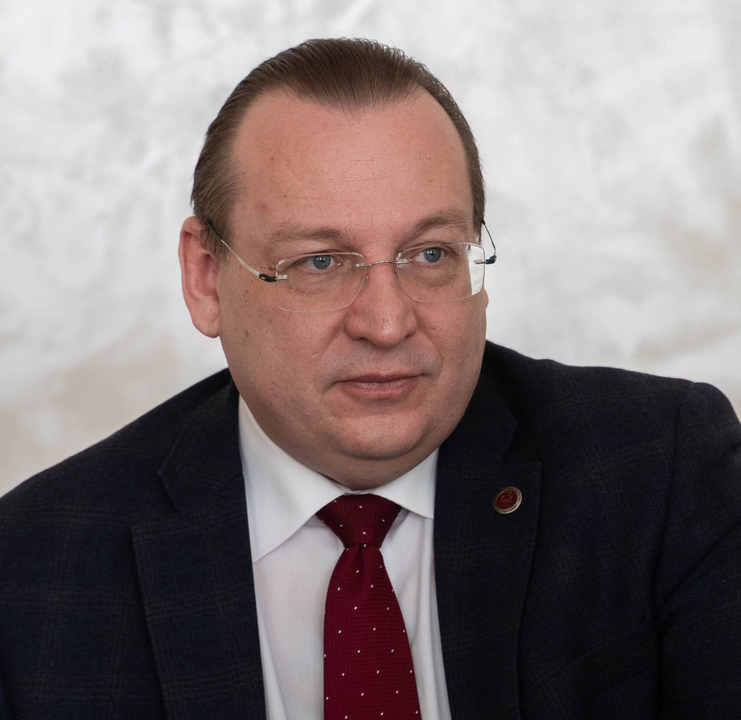
- Born: May 5, 1971 (age 55); Kungur, USSR
- Education: Perm University
- Awards: Honorary Employee of Higher Professional Education of the Russian Federation
- Scientific career
- Fields: Physics
- Workplaces: Perm University
- Patrons: M. Suslov
- Website: D. G. Krasilnikov, Rectorate of PSU(in russian)

Dmitriy Georgievich Krasilnikov (Russian: Дми́трий Гео́ргиевич Краси́льников; born 5 May 1971, in Kungur, USSR) is a Russian politologist, a public character, Doctor of Political Science, a professor, and a rector of the Perm University (since 2020). A chairman of the Perm Civic Chamber.

A vice-rector for Strategic Development, Economics and Legal Affairs (from 2011 to 2018), a vice-rector for common questions (from 2018 to 2020), a Head of Chair of State and municipal management (from 2011 to 2018) of the Perm University. A researcher of the administrative reform in contemporary Russia and transitional political developments.

== Biography ==
In 1993, he graduated from the Department of History of the Perm University.

From 1993 to 1994, he was a research assistant. From 1994 to 1997, he was a post-graduate student at the Department of Russian History. In addition, he is a student of Mikhail Suslov. In 1997, he defended a dissertation for the Candidate of Historical Sciences. The name of dissertation is “The authority in the Transitional Periods of Russian History (1917–1918, 1985–1993): comparative analysis”. In 2002, he defended his doctoral thesis “Intersystem political situations in Russia in the XX century” and was awarded the rank of associate professor.

From 1997 to 2003, he worked as an assistant, Senior Lecturer, Senior Researcher, Associate Professor and professor of Political Sciences of the Perm University. From 2004 to 2013, he was the Head of the Regional Institute of Continuing Education.

From the end of 2013 to 2020, he acted as the Head of the Department of State and Municipal Management. Since 2011, he has been working as the Deputy Editor-in-Chief of the academic journal «Ars administrandi».

On 2 November 2011 Krasilnikov had become a Prorector for Strategic Development, Economics and Legal Issues of the Perm University. From 2012 to 2013, he studied at Moscow School of Management SKOLKOVO. Moreover, he was on probation in the UK, Spain and the United States.

A chairman of the Perm Civic Chamber (since 2014). In 2015 he was a candidate for Chief of Staff of Governor of Perm Krai instead of Viktor Basargin.

From July 2020, he is a rector of the Perm University.

== Public work ==
- Since 2014 he has been a chairperson of the Civic Chamber of Perm Krai.
- Since 2017 he has been a member of the Scientific and Expert Council of the Chairman of the Federation Council of the Federal Assembly.
- He is a member of the Public Council of the Volga Federal District for the Development of Civil Society institutions under the Representative of the President of the Russian Federation in the Volga Federal District.
- He is a member of the Academic Councils of Perm State University and the Faculty of History and Political Science.
- Since 2001 he has been a member of the Russian Association of Political Science.
- He is a member of the Public Council under the Ministry of the Perm Krai.
- He is a member of the Advisory Council under the Ministry of Economic Development of the Perm Krai.
- Since 2013 he has been a member of the council of Education under the Governor of the Perm Krai.

== Scientific activities ==
The range of scientific interests is wide. It is connected with the study of transitional political processes, political institutions of modern Russia, the analysis of Russian public administration. He studied the directions of administrative reform, researched the forms of the regional governance and socio-economic development of territories in Russia.

Dmitriy Krasilnikov is the author of many researches that are used at the universities and the Head of a number of major scientific projects.

== Bibliography ==
=== Books ===
- Krasilnikov D. G. Power and political parties in the transitional periods of National History (1917-1918, 1985-1993): the experience of comparative analysis. Perm: the Perm University Press, 1998. 306 p.
- Krasilnikov D. G. Intersystem political situations in Russia in the XX century: questions of theory and history. Perm: the Perm University Press, 2001. 251 p.
- Krasilnikov D. G., Chirkunov O. A., Sukhoi V. A., Blus P. I., etc. The program of socio-economic development of the Perm Krai (workbook) 2008 Perm: Agency "Stil-MG", 2008.
- Krasilnikov D. G., Borisov A. A., Troitskaya E. A., Sukhoi V. A., etc. Report on the development of human potential in the Perm Krai / Edited by S. N. Bobylev (chapter) // Perm, 2010. 126 p.
- Krasilnikov D. G., Sivintseva O. V., Troitskaya E. A., Titova S. R., Urasova A. A. Effective state: Modern management models in the institutional environment of Russia and China. Perm State University Press. Perm, 2016. 308 p.
- Krasilnikov D. G., Blus P. I., Ganin O. B., etc. Strategizing the development of the municipality in the socio-economic space of the region: analysis, dynamics, mechanisms. Perm: Perm State University Press, 2016. 292 p.
- Kaye R., Krasilnikov D. G. Constitutional foundations of Russia and the United Kingdom // Russia and Britain in search of decent governance: a teaching aid. Perm, 2000. P. 95-115.
- Borisov A. A., Borisova N. V., Danilova G. A., Krasilnikov D. G. Transformation of the Political institutions: the twentieth Century. The political process and the evolution of political institutions in the XX century: a teaching aid. Perm, 2005. P. 115-170.
- Krasilnikov D. G. Theory of systems as a methodology for the study of the Russian political process: a teaching aid. Perm State University Press. Perm, 2015. 172 p.

=== Articles ===
- Krasilnikov D. G., Bulakhtin M. A. About the role of the historical component in the preparing of political scientists // Teaching Political Science in Russian universities. All-Russian Scientific and Practical Conference. 26–27 May 2000. Krasnodar: The Kuban State University.
- Krasilnikow D. Przejściowe procesy polityczne w Rosji w wymiarze systemowym // Europa w XX wieku. Glówne kierunki rozwoju (ekologia, gospodarka, kultura, polityka) Lodz, 2001. S. 239—247.
- Krasilnikov D. G. Political source studies: a new sector of humanitarian knowledge? (To the formulation of the problem) // Political Almanac of the Kama Region. Perm, 2004. Issue 4. P. 73-82.
- Krasilnikov D. G. Typological classification of political parties // Citizen, soldier, scientist: memoirs and research. In memory of Alexander Israelevich Zevelev. Moscow: Sobranie, 2007. P. 405-420.
- Krasilnikov D. G., Troitskaya E. A. New state management and administrative reform in Perm Krai // Ars Administrandi: Yearbook-2009 Perm State University Press. Perm, 2009. P. 74-84.
- Krasilnikov D. G. Factors of development of civic education in modern Russia: opportunities and limitations // Bulletin of Perm University. History and Political Science. 2009. Issue 4. P. 91-94.
- Krasilnikov D. G., Krasnykh M. A. "The Party of power" and the ruling party: on the question of the correlation of concepts // Bulletin of Perm University. Political Science. 2009. Issue 1.
- Krasilnikov D. G. MAGU of the Volga Federal District: a new mechanism for the formation of the personnel reserve of authorities // Small Academies of Public Administration (2007-2009): collection of materials. Samara: LLC "Etching", 2009. P. 21-25.
- Krasilnikov D. G. Models of university districts in modern Russia // Herald of Perm University. Ser. "University education". 2009. Issue 6 (32). P. 58-61.
- Krasilnikov D. G., Borisov A. A., Troitskaya E. A. Reforming the human potential management system in the context of administrative reform in Perm Krai // Herald of Perm University. Political Science. 2010. Issue 2. P. 43-58.
- Krasilnikov D. G., Sheshukova T. G. History and prospects of development of management accounting at the enterprise // Herald of Perm University. Economics. 2010. Issue 4(7). P. 20-26.
- Krasilnikov D. G., Troitskaya E. A. The practice of using basic NPM tools in the Perm Region // Issues of state and municipal management. 2011. No. 1. P. 157-166.
- Krasilnikov D. G., Prudsky V. G. Transition to post-industrial economy and development of the West Ural scientific school of Management // Ars administrandi. 2011. No. 2. P. 13-29.
- Krasilnikov D. G., Troitskaya E. A. The concept of "New Public Management": opportunities and limitations // Bulletin of Perm University. Political Science. 2011. No. 1. P.81-91.
- Krasilnikov D. G., Yakimova M. N.PMBOK standard and project management in public authorities of Perm Krai: approximation to the ideal // Ars Administrandi. 2011. No. 3. P. 44-54.
- Krasilnikov D. G., Urasova A. A. About the measuring of the innovative development of the region as a socio-economic system // Herald of Perm University. Ser. "Economics". 2012. No. 1. P. 28-33.
- Krasilnikov D. G., Mirolyubova T. V. Modern approaches to state management of the regional economy in the context of innovative development tasks // Herald of Perm University. Economics. 2012. No. 3. P. 6-11.
- Krasilnikov D. G., Urasova A. A. The role of strategic positioning in the regional economy // Herald of Perm University. Economics. 2012. Special Issue. P. 119-124.
- Krasilnikov D. G. Project scientific activity: educational effects (experience of the Department of Political Sciences of IPF PGNIU) // Herald of Perm University. Political Science. 2013. No. 3. P. 180-189.
- Krasilnikov D. G., Antipova T. V. The Strategic Management of the University // Global Conference On Business And Finance Proceedings. Vol. 9. No. 1. 2014. P. 338-343.
- Krasilnikov D. G., Sivintseva O. V., Troitskaya E. A. Modern Western management models: Synthesis of New Public Management and Good Governance // Ars Administrandi. 2014. No. 2. P. 45-62.
- Krasilnikov D. G., Sivintseva O. V. New state management in China: a conservative version of administrative transformations // World Economy and International Relations. 2016. No. 8. Vol. 60. P. 85-95.

== Awards ==
- The winner of the contests for the best research work of the Perm University (in 1997 and in 2002).
- The prize laureate of the Perm Region in Science (in 1999).
- The Honorary Worker of Higher Professional Education of the Russian Federation (in 2011).

== Links ==
- Dmitriy Krasilnikov // Perm State University.
- Dmitriy Krasilnikov // Perm State University.
- Краевую общественную палату возглавил проректор ПГНИУ Дмитрий Красильников // FederalPress. 05.02.2014.
- Dmitriy Krasilnikov // Ars Administrandi.
- Красильников Дмитрий Георгиевич. Лидер научного направления «Управление социально-экономическим и политическим развитием» // Пермский государственный национальный исследовательский университет.
- Dmitriy Krasilnikov // Business Class.
- Dmitriy Krasilnikov // Perm Civic Chamber.
- Председателем Общественной палаты Пермского края стал проректор ПГНИУ, профессор Дмитрий Красильников // Perm City Portal.

Preceded by Igor Makarikhin	Rector of Perm University; 2020–	Succeeded by
