= Vladimir Kostitsyn =

Russian geophysicist (born 1945)

- Владимир Костицын
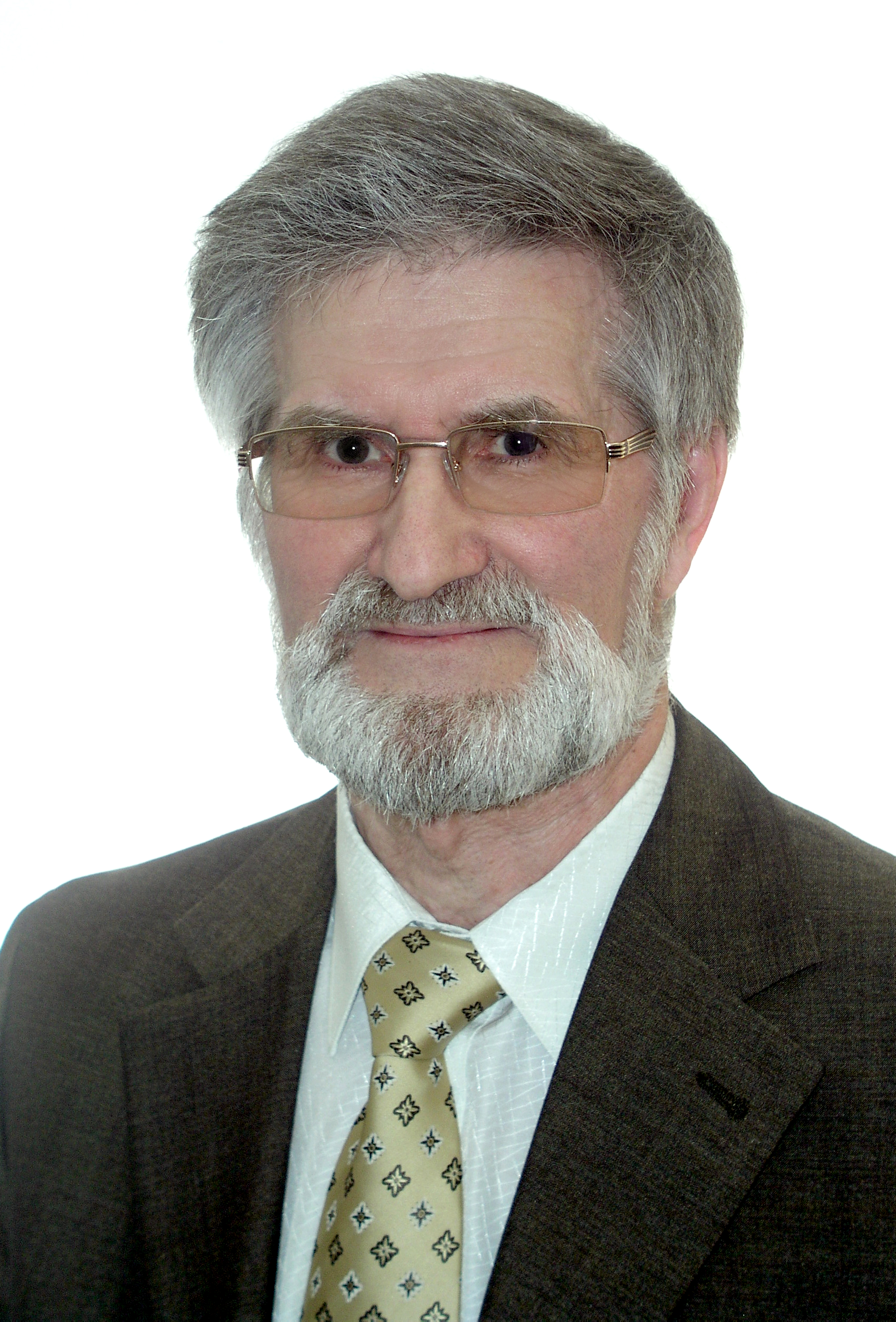
- Kostitsyn in 2014
- Born: 2 July 1945 (age 80); Falyonsky District, Kirov Oblast, Russia
- Occupation: Geophysicist

Vladimir Ilyich Kostitsyn (Russian: Владимир Ильич Костицын; born 2 July 1945) is a Russian geophysicist. He attended Perm State University. He was a full-time member of the Russian Academy of Natural Sciences since 1997. He was a recipient of the Medal of the Order "For Merit to the Fatherland".
