= Fyodor Gorovoy =

Soviet local historian and historian (1916–1973)

- Born: February 22, 1916; Ploskoe village, Ananyevsky Uyezd, Kherson Governorate, Russian Empire.
- Died: 8 June 1973 (aged 57); Perm, Russian Soviet Federative Socialist Republic, Soviet Union
- Education: K. D. Ushinsky South Ukrainian National Pedagogical University
- Scientific career
- Fields: History
- Workplaces: Perm State University

Fyodor Semyonovich Gorovoy (Russian: Фёдор Семёнович Горово́й February 9 (22), 1916, Ploskoe village, Ananyevsky county, Kherson province — June 8, 1973, Perm) was a Soviet historian, Doctor of Historical Sciences, professor, head of the Department of History of the USSR (1948-1961), Rector of Perm State University (1961–1970), Honored Scientist of the RSFSR (1966), member of the Scientific Council for the History of Cities and Villages under the Presidium of the USSR Academy of Sciences. Deputy of the Perm regional, city and Dzerzhinsk district Councils of the city of Perm.

== Biography ==
He was born on February 22 (9), 1916 in the village of Ploskoe, Ananyevsky county, Kherson province, in a working-class family.

In 1932, he graduated from a seven-year school and entered the Kherson Agricultural Institute, but did not complete his studies due to illness. From January to October 1933, he worked as an agricultural technician at the Ananiev machine tractor station (MTS). In October 1933, he entered the Kamyanets-Podolsky Institute, and after its closure in 1935, he was transferred to the third course of the Historical Faculty of the Odessa Pedagogical Institute. In June 1937, he successfully graduated from the institute and began working as a high school teacher.

In 1937-1939, Gorovoy served in the Soviet Army. After the army, he worked as a school principal and head of the local education authority and at the same time studied in postgraduate course at the Department of History of the USSR of Kharkiv Pedagogical Institute.

Since August 1941, he participated in the World War II, was a battery commander, artillery commander of a rifle regiment, division commander. During the war, he was wounded twice and concussed three times.

In 1944, Gorovoy was appointed senior lecturer of artillery at the Military Department of Perm State University. In 1945, he was invited to the position of senior lecturer at the Department of History of the USSR, Perm State University.

On June 28, 1946, he was awarded the degree of Candidate of Historical Sciences after defending his PhD thesis "Unrest of the peasants of the Perm Cis-Urals in the 60s of the XIX century".

In 1948–1961, F. S. Gorovoy was the head of the Department of History of the USSR. In the early 1950s, he worked as the secretary of the party organization of the Historical and Philological Faculty of Molotov (Perm) University.

In 1952–1954, he studied at the doctoral program of the Institute of History of the USSR Academy of Sciences, scientific consultant — V. K. Yatsunsky. On November 15, 1954, he defended his doctoral dissertation "The abolition of serfdom in the Urals" (official opponents S. M. Dubrovsky, P. A. Zayonchkovsky and M. V. Nechkina). In April 1955, he was awarded the academic title of Professor. In 1955-1956, he lectured in Prague.

In October 1961, F. S. Gorovoy was appointed rector of Perm State University, which he headed until July 1970.

After leaving the post of rector, he again became the head of the Department of the History of the USSR of the pre-Soviet period (1970-1973). He opposed the celebration of the 250th anniversary of Perm in 1973, believing that the city was founded by the decree of Catherine II in 1781.

He died in Perm on June 8, 1973. He is buried in the Southern Cemetery.

== Sources ==
- Gorovoy Fyodor Semyonovich. Ural Historical Encyclopedia. Accessed: January 2, 2013.
- Gorovoy Fyodor Semyonovich. Encyclopedia "Perm Krai". Accessed: January 2, 2013. Archived from the original on January 26, 2013.
- Gorovoy Fyodor Semyonovich. Agency for Archives of the Perm Region. Accessed: September 22, 2013.
- Mukhin V. V., Shilov A.V. Gorovoy Fyodor Semyonovich. Library of Siberian Local Lore. Accessed: September 22, 2013.
- Gorovoy Fyodor Semyonovich / / Kostitsyn V. I. Rectors of the Perm University. 1916-2006. 2nd Ed., reprint. and add. / Perm State University, Perm, 2006. 352 p. p. 215-231.
- Shilov A.V. Front-line soldier, scientist, rector / / / / Reflection of the vanished years. Calendar-directory of the city of Perm for 2016. Perm: "Pushka", 2016. 316 p.
- Foundation № p-1111. Gorovoy Fyodor Semyonovich. State Archive of the Perm Region. Accessed: January 2, 2013.
