= Maria Prokhorova =

Russian biologist (1903–1993)

- Мария Илларионовна Прохорова
- Born: Maria Illarionovna Prokhorova; 20 July 1903; Levoschkino Village, Pskov Oblast, Russian Empire
- Died: 1993 (aged 89–90)
- Awards: Order of Lenin, Order of the Badge of Honour, Medal "For the Defence of Leningrad", Medal "For Valiant Labour in the Great Patriotic War 1941-1945", Honored Scientist of RSFSR

Academic background
- Education: Leningrad State University

Academic work
- Discipline: Biology; physiology

Maria Illarionovna Prokhorova (Russian: Мария Илларионовна Прохорова, Russian pronunciation: [mɐˈrijə ɪl(ː)ərʲɪˈonəvnə ˈproxərəvə]; 20 July 1903 – 1993) was a Russian scientist and biologist

She was the Head of Molotov University, the Dean of Faculty of Biology and Soil Studies at Leningrad State University; also she was the Head of A.A. Ukhtomsky Physiology Institute, a member of International Society for Neurochemistry, Doctor of Biology, and professor.

Prokhorova took part in the Great Patriotic War (WWII's Eastern Front) as a researcher on gas gangrene and its methods of treatment.

== Early life and education ==
Prokhorova was born on 20 July 1903 in Levoschkino Village, Pskov Oblast in the Russian Empire.

In 1924, she graduated from the biological department of the Physics and Mathematics faculty of Leningrad State University. In 1934, she completed a postgraduate course at Leningrad State University.

== Career ==
In the early 30s, she worked for some time at the Devyatinskaya school of the Vytegorsky county of the Lodeynopolsky district of the Leningrad region (now the Vytegorsky district of the Vologda region), doing extracurricular work (according to the testimony of Anastasia Nikitichna Shestopalova (Vershinina), supported by a photograph of Maria with a group of students of Devyatinskaya school).

From 1935 to 1937, she worked as deputy dean of the Faculty of Biology, was a senior researcher at the Physiological Institute, and an assistant, and then an associate professor of the Department of Biochemistry at the Faculty of Biology of Leningrad University.

In 1930, she became a member of the Communist Party of the Soviet Union (CPSU).

From October 2, 1937, to June 12, 1940, she was rector of Molotov (Perm) University.

Prokhorova participated in the All-Union Congresses of Physiologists and Biochemists in 1934 and 1937. In 1935, she was a delegate and speaker at the XV International Physiological Congress (Moscow, Leningrad).

From 1940 to 1941, she worked as an associate professor at the Department of Biochemistry, Faculty of Biology, Leningrad University. The following year, she served as head of the Department of Biochemistry at Leningrad University in Saratov.

During World War II, Prokhorova headed the implementation of a special topic on the study of gas gangrene in order to develop ways of its therapy at Leningrad State University. During the siege of Leningrad, she was a member of the air defense group of Leningrad State University. She also conducted scientific and practical work at a neurosurgical hospital in Saratov.

In 1952, Prokhorova became a professor of the Department of Biochemistry. From 1955 to 1958, she was Dean of the Faculty of Biology and Soil Studies of Leningrad State University and Director of the University of Physiology named after Aleksey Alekseevich Ukhtomsky.

=== Scientific achievements ===
In 1961, Prokhorova initiated a special laboratory of biochemistry of the nervous system which was organized at Leningrad University.

She was the first scientist in Russia to use radioactive carbon in animal experiments, offering methods for determining "labeled" compounds in animal tissues. Her methodological approaches allowed us to obtain new fundamental data that changed the existing provisions on carbohydrate, lipid and energy metabolism of the brain. The methodological approaches developed by her allowed us to obtain new fundamental data that changed the existing provisions on carbohydrate, lipid and energy metabolism of the brain and subsequently resulted in the creation of the School of neurochemists of Leningrad University. These works were highly appreciated by foreign scientists, and this was confirmed by her election as a member of the International Neurochemical Society.

Prokhorova trained more than 40 candidates of Science and 6 doctors of Science in biology.

== Sources ==
- Prokhorova M. I. On the assignment of the People's Commissariat of the RSFSR // Comp. A. S. Stabrovsky. - Perm: Publishing house of the Tomsk University. Perm Branch 1991. - pp. 59–64.
- Kostitsyn V. I. Prokhorova Maria Illarionovna / / Rectors of the Perm University. 1916–2006. 2nd Ed., reprint. and add. / Perm University, Perm, 2006. - pp. 124–133
