= Nina Gorlanova =

Russian writer (born 1947)

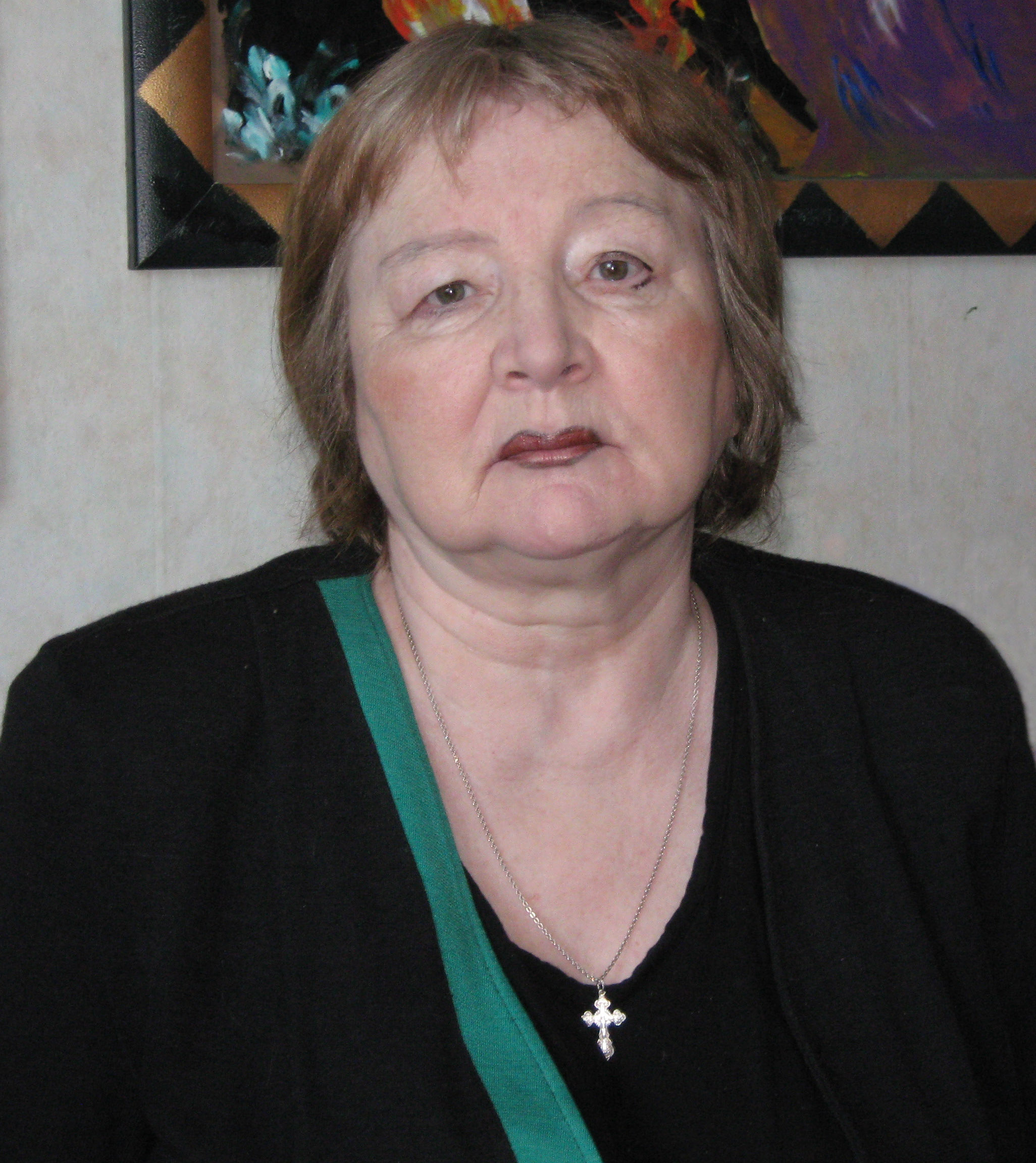
A portrait of Nina Viktorovna Gorlanova

Nina Viktorovna Gorlanova (Russian: Нина Викторовна Горланова, born 23 November 1947) is a modern short-story writer and novelist who has been living in a provincial Russian city Perm.

== Biography ==
Gorlanova was born in 1947, grew up in a village in Perm region, and studied philology at Perm University. She now lives with her husband Vyacheslav Bukur, her co-author and life companion in Perm city, where most of her stories and novels are set. In her works she creates a somewhat fantastic world populated with curious characters and possessing its own mythology. The life in her invented Perm is squalid but merry, risky but indestructible. Her main themes are maternity, hardships of everyday chores of a typical Russian woman, life of provincial intelligentsia.

== Writings and awards ==
Gorlanova's short novel "Love in Rubber Gloves" won first prize at the International Competition for Women's Prose.

Her novel "Roman vospitaniya" ("Learning a Lesson") was short-listed for the Russian Booker Prize (1996).

Her stories have been published for many years in major Russian literary magazines.

She had guest author readings in Germany, her short-stories were published in English in "NINE of Russia's Foremost Women Writers" (ISBN 5-7172-0063-3), an anthology, 288 pp. with photographs and authors' notes.
