= Vladimir Barsukov =

Vladimir Viktorovich Barsukov
- Владимир Викторович Барсуков
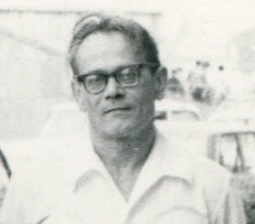
- Born: December 2, 1922; Tobolsk, Tyumen Governorate, RSFSR
- Died: September 3, 1989 (aged 66)
- Education: Perm State University
- Occupation: ichthyologist
- Known for: Systematics of Scorpaeniformes

Vladimir Viktorovich Barsukov (December 2, 1922, Tobolsk — September 3, 1989) was a Soviet ichthyologist, Doctor of Biological Sciences, and a specialist in the systematics of Scorpaeniformes.

== Biography ==
He was born into a family of teachers on December 2, 1922, in Tobolsk. In 1940, he became a student at Perm University. From 1943 to 1945, he took part in the Great Patriotic War. After the war, he resumed his studies at the university and graduated in 1949. In 1953, he completed postgraduate studies at the Zoological Institute and defended his Candidate of Sciences dissertation, titled “A Review of Fishes of the Wolffish Family (Anarhichadidae).” In 1953–1954, he worked at the Borok Biological Station, after which he joined the Zoological Institute.

For 17 years, from 1971 to 1987, he served as head of the Laboratory of Ichthyology. In 1981, he defended his Doctor of Sciences dissertation, titled “Sebastinae Rockfishes of the World Ocean: Their Morphology, Ecology, Distribution, Dispersal, and Evolution.” Under his supervision, two Candidate of Sciences dissertations were completed. He died on September 3, 1989, after a long and serious illness.

== Scientific achievements ==
He was one of the leading specialists in the systematics of Scorpaeniformes. He carried out a revision of the world fauna of rockfishes. Drawing on anatomical, physiological, and ecological data, he identified their phylogenetic relationships as well as the features of their speciation and distribution. He was the first to describe 15 new fish taxa. He also studied the hydrodynamic properties of fish scales. He served as an expert for the Scientific Council on the Biosphere of the World Ocean and was elected an honorary member of the American Society of Ichthyologists and Herpetologists.

== Selected publications ==
He was the author of more than 100 publications, including:

- Барсуков В. В. Сем. Зубаток (Anarhichadidae) // Фауна СССР. Рыбы. — М.—Л.: Издательство АН СССР, 1959. — Т. 5, вып. 5. — 174 с. — (Новая серия № 73).
- Барсуков В. В. О возрасте обского муксуна и о некоторых теоретических вопросах // Зоологический журнал. — 1960. — Т. 39, № 10. — С. 1525—1530.
- Барсуков В. В. О сроках смены зубов у атлантических зубаток (Anarhichadidae) // Зоологический журнал. — 1961. — Т. 40, № 3. — С. 462—461.
- Barsukov V. V., Zhiteneva T. S. The changes in body proportions of pacific ocean perch (Sebastes alutus Gilbert) at different periods of its ontogeny in Alaska bay (англ.) // Hydrobiological Journal. — 2003. — Vol. 39, no. 4. — P. 54—64. — doi:10.1615/HydrobJ.v39.i4.50.
