= Irina Ivshina =

Russian microbiologist

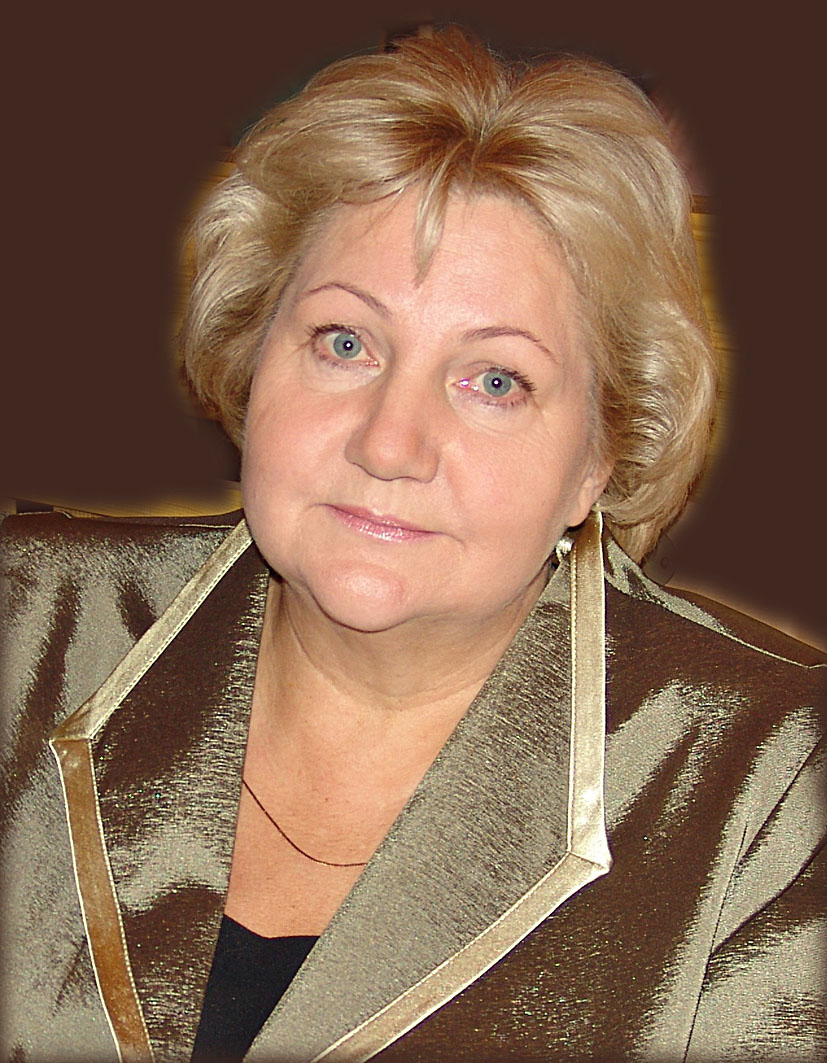
Irina Ivshina

Irina Borysivna Ivshina (born 12 June 12, 1950, Perm, Russia) is a Russian microbiologist. She is head of the Laboratory of Alcanotrophic Microorganisms of the Institute of Ecology and Genetics of Microorganisms (IEGM).

She is a professor at the Perm State University. She is vice-president of the Russian Microbiological Society. She was an editor for Molecules.

== Works ==
- Ivshina, Irina; Tyumina, Elena; Vikhareva, Elena (2018-09-13). "Biodegradation of emerging pollutants: focus on pharmaceuticals". Microbiology Australia. 39 (3): 117–122. doi:10.1071/MA18037 (inactive 29 September 2025). ISSN 2201-9189.
- Ivshina, Irina; Kostina, Ludmila; Krivoruchko, Anastasiya; Kuyukina, Maria; Peshkur, Tatyana; Anderson, Peter; Cunningham, Colin (15 July 2016). "Removal of polycyclic aromatic hydrocarbons in soil spiked with model mixtures of petroleum hydrocarbons and heterocycles using biosurfactants from Rhodococcus ruber IEGM 231". Journal of Hazardous Materials. 312: 8–17. Bibcode:2016JHzM..312....8I. doi:10.1016/j.jhazmat.2016.03.007. ISSN 1873-3336. PMID 27015374.
- Kuyukina, Maria; Krivoruchko, Anastasiya; Ivshina, Irina (2018-09-13). "Hydrocarbon- and metal-polluted soil bioremediation: progress and challenges". Microbiology Australia. 39 (3): 133–136. doi:10.1071/MA18041 (inactive 29 September 2025). ISSN 2201-9189.
- Luchnikova, Natalia A.; Grishko, Victoria V.; Ivshina, Irina B. (2020-11-25). "Biotransformation of Oleanane and Ursane Triterpenic Acids". Molecules. 25 (23): 5526. doi:10.3390/molecules25235526. PMC 7728323. PMID 33255782.
