= Vladimir Malanin =

Russian mathematician

Vladimir Vladimirovich Malanin
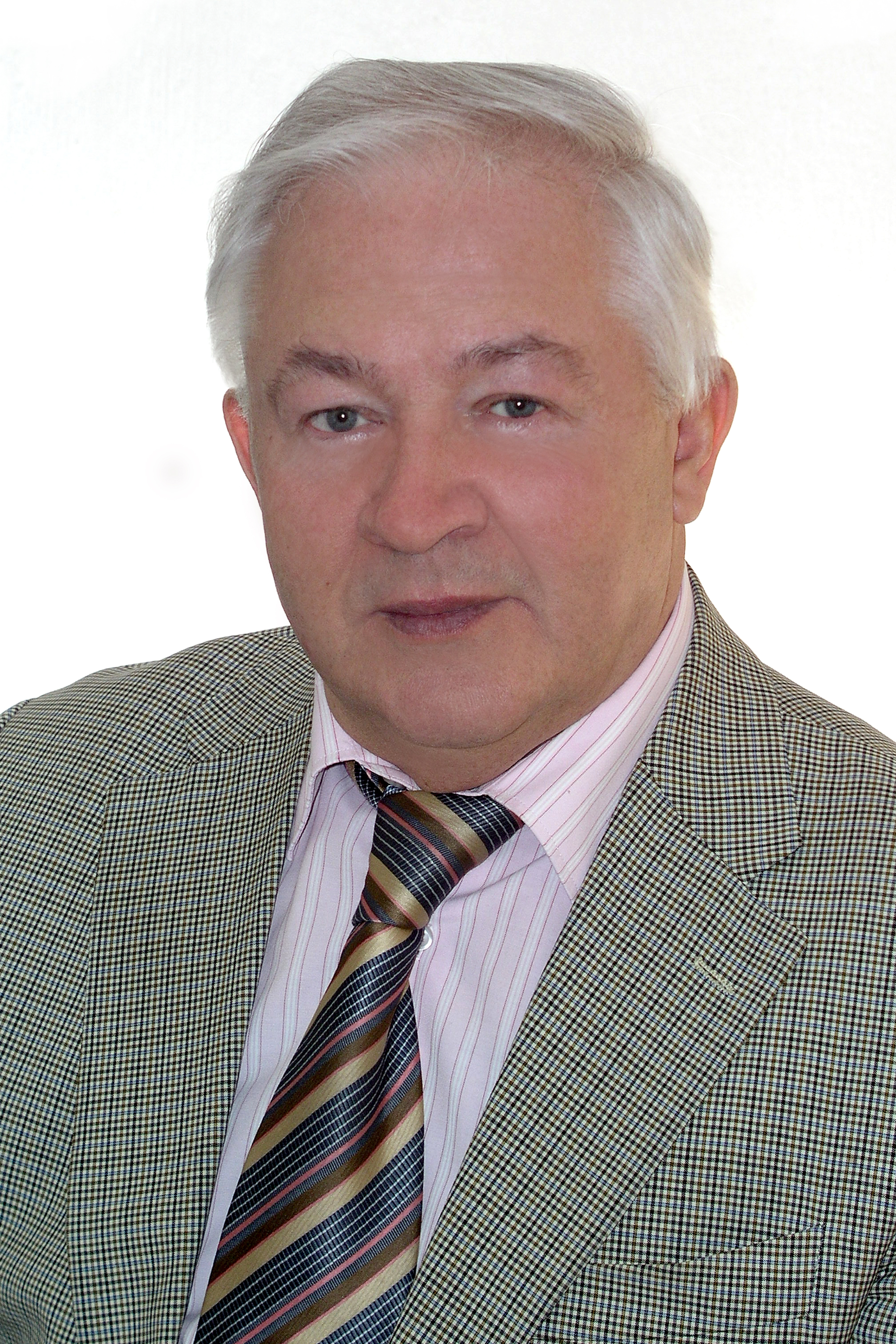
- Born: August 30, 1942 (age 84); Sylvensk, Kungursky District, USSR
- Education: Perm University
- Scientific career
- Fields: Mathematics, Mechanics, Mathematical model, Mathematical optimization
- Workplaces: Perm University
- Patrons: I. Vereschagin
- Doctoral students: O. Pensky
- Website: Vladimir Malanin (in Russian)

Vladimir Vladimirovich Malanin (born August 30, 1942, Sylvensk, Kungursky District, USSR) is a Russian mathematician.

Rector, vice-rector and president of Perm University. Head of the Department of Control Processes and Information Security of the Faculty of Mechanics and Mathematics of Perm University. Confidant of Russian President Vladimir Putin in the presidential elections (2000, 2004, 2012).

== Biography ==
From 1960 to 1965, he was studying at the Faculty of Mechanics and Mathematics of Perm University. As one of the best students of Perm University, in the fifth year he had an opportunity to study and internship at the Faculty of Mechanics and Mathematics of the Moscow State University.

His dissertation was titled "Some questions of the study of the process of launching an aircraft to a given program". His scientific supervisor was I. F. Vereshchagin. Candidate of Physical and Mathematical Sciences (1970, professor (1991), Doctor of Technical Sciences (2001).

From November 1975 to the end of 2011, he was the Head of the Department of Mechanics and Control Processes (since 2006 — the Department of Control Processes and Information Security) of the Faculty of Mechanics and Mathematics of Perm University.

From 1983 to 1987, he was a vice-rector for scientific work at Perm University. In March 1987, Malanin was appointed the rector by the decision of the University staff. It was one of the first times in the USSR and the first in the RSFSR when the head of the university in this way. Then he was re-elected to this position four times (in 1992, 1997, 2002, 2007). On January 15, 2010, he was dismissed from the post of rector at his own will. He was elected a President of Perm University. From 2010, he was a member of many scientific and educational Councils, Centers and Associations.

Confidant of Russian President Vladimir Putin in the presidential elections (2000, 2004, 2012). Chairman of the Public Council of Perm Krai Police Department (2010–2013), member of Perm Krai Public Chamber (2010–2015).

He can speak fluently English and French.

== Scientific activities ==
His research interests are also related to such topics as Computer algebra, Mathematical Modeling in natural sciences, General and Applied Mechanics, methods of Optimization and History of Physical and Mathematical sciences.

The longest term direction of scientific research is the solution of problems of optimal flight control of aircraft. He has been developing methods of solid mechanics that use the Rodrigue–Hamilton and Cayley–Klein parameters to describe motion.

Since 1975, under the leadership of V. V. Malanin, there have been scientific seminars on dynamical systems at the Department of Mechanics of Perm University. He had scientific internships in 1976 and 1977 at the Sorbonne (France) and in 1999 at Oxford (Great Britain).

Under the leadership of V. V. Malanin, there were international and regional conferences, symposiums and seminars in Perm University and other educational and scientific institutions of the Perm Krai. He is the head of research works on grants from CDRF (American Foundation for Civil Research and Development, 2002–2008) and the Russian Foundation for Basic Research (since 2002).

He was a scientific consultant of two doctoral dissertations (I. Poloskov, 2004; O. Pensky, 2007). Since 2010, he has been the Chairman of the Doctoral Dissertation Council of Perm University for Physical and Mathematical Sciences and of Perm Regional Branch of the Russian Foundation for Basic Research.

He is the author and co-author of more than 440 publications in various fields of science. 139 of them were published in the closed press, 5 scientific manuals for universities, 10 monographs, 5 certificates of official registration of computer programs, 4 certificates of official registration of Database Management Systems, 16 patents and certificates of state registration.

Since 2010, he is a member of the National Committee for Theoretical and Applied Mechanics of the Russian Academy of Sciences (2002), the Deputy Chairman of the Scientific and Methodological Council for Theoretical Mechanics of the Ministry of Education and Science of the Russian Federation.

== Bibliography ==
- Bugaenko G. A., Malanin V. V., Yakovlev V. I. Fundamentals of classical mechanics: Textbook for universities. Moscow: Higher School, 1999. 367 p.
- Malanin V. V., Poloskov I. E. Random processes in nonlinear dynamical systems. Analytical and numerical methods of research. Moscow; Izhevsk: Scientific Publishing Centre "Regular and chaotic dynamics", 2001. 160 p.
- Malanin V. V., Strelkova N. A. The Vietoris method and its application to problems of statistical dynamics and optimal control. Moscow; Izhevsk: Scientific Publishing Centre "Regular and chaotic dynamics", 2002—140 p.
- Malanin V. V., Strelkova N. A. Optimal control of orientation and helical motion of a rigid body. Moscow; Izhevsk: Scientific Publishing Centre "Regular and chaotic dynamics", 2004. 204 p.
- Malanin V. V., Poloskov I. E. Methods and practice of analysis of random processes in dynamic systems: textbook. manual. Moscow; Izhevsk: Scientific Publishing Centre "Regular and chaotic dynamics", 2005. 296 p.

== Awards and Titles ==
- Award pin "For excellent achievements in work in the field of higher education" (1987).
- Medal "Veteran of Labour" (1990).
- Diploma of the Presidium of the Supreme Soviet of the Russian Federation — for the great contribution into the development of Science, Education and Public Education (September 7, 1992).
- Honored Worker of Science of the Russian Federation (1995).
- Honorary Worker of Higher Professional Education of the Russian Federation (1996).
- Order "For Merit to the Fatherland" Fourth Class — for services to the State, many years of conscientious work and a great contribution to strengthening friendship and cooperation between people (2000).
- Diploma of the laureate in the nomination "Science and education" in the contest "Person of the Year" of Perm European Club (2007).
- Order "For Merit to the Fatherland" — for merits in the field of education, science and a great contribution to the training of qualified specialists (2008).
- Certificate of Merit of the Eurasian Association of Universities (2011).
- Honorary Citizen of Perm (May 22, 2012).
- Honored Professor of Perm University (2015).
- Letters of Gratitude from the President of the Russian Federation (March 2000, May 2000, May 2012, December 2012).

== Links ==
- Vladimir Malanin // Perm University.
- Vladimir Vladimirovich Malanin // Kostitsyn V. Rectors of Perm University. 1916—2016. Perm, 2016. 352 P. pp. 241–295.
- Poloskov I. Great jubilee of a great scientist (to the 70th anniversary of V. V. Malanin) // Perm Scientific Center Herald. № 3—4. pp. 129–145. 2019.
- Ostapenko E., Yakovlev V. Vladimir Vladimirovich Malanin (to the 75th birthday) // Bulletin of the Perm University. Maths. Mechanics. Informatics. № 3(38) 2017. С. 98–108.
- Sofin D. M. Vladimir Vladimirovich Malanin. To the 75th Anniversary of the First President of Perm University // Perm City Archive. 2017.
- UNIVERSUM of Vladimir Malanin

Preceded by Viktor Zhivopistsev	Rector of Perm University; 1987–2010	Succeeded by Igor Makarikhin
