= Lina Fazylovna Rakhmatullina =

Russian mathematician

Lina Fazylovna Rakhmatullina (1932-2024) was a Russian mathematician and Honored Worker of the Higher School of the Russian Federation who specialized in functional differential equations. Rakhmatullina was born in Tatarstan and defended her doctoral dissertation at the National Academy of Sciences of Ukraine. She led a research center on functional differential equations at Perm State University.

Rakhmatullina's doctoral students included Vladimir Maksimov.
