= Roman Mertslin =

Russian chemist (1903–1971)

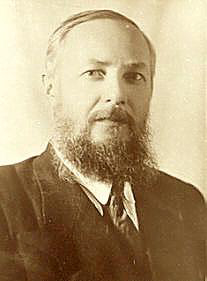
- Born: Roman Viktorovich Mertslin; October 17, 1903; Saratov, Russian Empire
- Died: February 11, 1971 (aged 67); Saratov, RSFSR, Soviet Union
- Education: Doctor of Chemical Sciences
- Alma mater: Saratov Chernyshevsky State University
- Scientific career
- Fields: Chemistry
- Workplaces: Perm State University, Saratov Chernyshevsky State University
- Notable students: A. A. Volkov

Roman Viktorovich Mertslin (Russian: Роман Викторович Мерцлин; 17 October 1903 – 11 February 1971) was a Soviet chemist, a Doctor of Chemical Sciences, a vice-rector for scientific studies (1940–1941, 1946–1950), a rector (1941–1945) of Molotov (Perm) University, a rector (1950–1965) of Saratov Chernyshevsky State University. He founded the scientific school of physical and chemical analysis, heterogeneous equilibria and developed the method of isothermal cross sections.

== Biography ==
In 1924, Mertslin graduated from the Department of Physics and Mathematics of Saratov Chernyshevsky State University. He taught chemistry at the Timiryazev Agricultural College in Saratov Oblast.

In 1928, he got the position of Senior Analytical Chemist at the Rubezhansky Chemical Plant in Donbass. Since 1929, he was an Assistant of the Head of the Laboratory of the Alapaevsk Metallurgical Plant in Sverdlovsk Region.

From 1929 to 1932, Mertslin worked as a lecturer of the Perm Institute of Chemical Technology and at the Department of Physical Chemistry of Perm University.

From 1932 to 1935, he was away on assignment at the NBC Protection Military Academy.

In 1935, he became a professor and the Head of the Department of Inorganic Chemistry at Perm University. He was the Head of the Department til 1950 (before returning to Saratov).

From 1937 to 1938, he was the Dean of the Chemical Department at Perm University.

In 1939, he defended his Doctor's Thesis "Foliation as a method of Physical and Chemical Analysis of multicomponent systems" at Moscow University.

From September 1940 to January 1944, Mertslin acted as a Vice-rector for Scientific and Educational Work at Molotov (Perm) University.

Since 25 August 1941, he was officially a vice-rector. A. I. Bukirev, who was the rector, went to the Great Patriotic War, that's why Mertslin began to perform the duties of the rector. At that time D. E. Kharitonov performed as a vice-rector for scientific and educational work instead of Mertslin.

Since 3 January 1944, Mertslin officially got the position of a rector of Molotov University. Mertslin was a rector until 1946 when A. I. Bukirev returned from the front of the Great Patriotic War.

From May 1946 to December 1950, Mertslin was a Vice-rector for Scientific work.

In 1950, he returned to Saratov. After that, V. F. Ust-Kachkintsev became a vice-rector.

From 1950 to 1965, he was a rector of Saratov Chernyshevsky State University and the Head of the Department of Physical and Chemical Analysis. Since 1965, he was the Head of the Department of Inorganic Chemistry.

Roman Viktorovich Mertslin died on February 11, 1971, at the age of 67. He was buried at the Saratov's Voskresnoe Cemetery.

== Scientific achievements ==
During his work at Perm University, Mertslin undertook fundamental researches in the field of Physical and Chemical Analysis and developed an isothermal cross-section method for studying multi-component systems. Mertslin was well known in the scientific world not only in Russia but also abroad. He is the co-author of the books "The Method of Sections. Its application to the study of the multiphase state of multicomponent systems" (1969), "Heterogeneous equilibria" (1971), and the author of more than 120 scientific articles.

Mertslin made a lot of important achievements when he was the Head of the Department of Inorganic Chemistry at Saratov State University. Other founders and he studied molecular, supramolecular systems and the creation of novel materials with specified properties. Together with his colleagues — Y. Y. Dodonov and N. I. Nikurashina, Mertslin led the foundations of the methodology for the study of various Physical and Chemical properties of individual, mixed solvents and salt systems based on them.

== Social activities ==
In Perm, starting from 1936, Mertslin was a deputy of the district Council of Workers' Deputies and a member of other committeesof higher education and scientific institutions. In Saratov, in 1956, Mertslin became a member of the Regional committee CPSU.

He was a delegate of the famous 20th Congress of the Communist Party of the Soviet Union. He had many orders and medals, also for his public activities.

As part of various Soviet delegations, Meritslin visited GDR, Finland, Romania and was the Head of the delegation of rectors of five Soviet Universities in United States.

== Awards ==
In 1948, Mertslin got the title of Honored Scientist of the RSFSR.

Mertslin received several honors in recognition of his contributions to scientific research, education, and public service. These included the Order of Lenin, the Order of the Red Banner of Labour, and several other medals..

== Students and followers ==
- Professor N. I. Nikurashina – the Head of the Department of Inorganic Chemistry at Saratov Chernyshevsky State University;
- Professor E. F. Zhuravlev – the Head of the Department of Inorganic Chemistry at Bashkir University;
- Professor I. L. Krupatkin – the Founder of the Department of Inorganic and Analytical Chemistry at Tver University;
- Professor V. F. Ust-Kachkintsev, associate professors K. I. Mochalov; A. A. Volkov, A.D. Sheveleva, S. F. Kudryashov, Doctor of Chemical Sciences F. R. Verzhbitsky, O. S. Kudryashova, S. A. Mazunin (Perm University);
- Professors K. K. Ilyin, A. G. Demakhin at Saratov Chernyshevsky State University;
- D. A. Khisaeva (Ufa) at Bashkir Scientific Research Design Institute of Oil products.

== Literature ==
- April 4, 2013. The museum hosted a meeting dedicated to the memory of the Rector of SSU R. V. Mertslin // Saratov Chernyshevsky State University.
- Berezniki electoral district No. 407. The staff of the Bereznikovsky nitrogen fertilization Plant nominated Joseph Vissarionovich Stalin, Kliment Efremovich Voroshilov, Roman Viktorovich Mertslin as candidates for deputies of the Supreme Soviet of the RSFSR // Zvezda publication (newspaper, Perm). Molotov, 1947. January 5.
- Bibliography of the scientific school of the Honored Scientist of the RSFSR, Doctor of Chemical Sciences, Professor Roman Viktorovich Mertslin. Perm: Perm University, 2002. 41 p.
- "Bugayenko P." Our rector is 60 years old // Leninsky Way. Saratov, 1963. November 16, p. 1.
- "Verzhbitsky F. R., Kudryashov S. F." Dedicated to R. V. Mertslin // Perm State University (newspaper). 1984. January 24.
- "Gomon N., Yazykova N., Mikryukova A." and others. Favorite mentor // Star. Molotov, 1947. February 7.
- "Ilyin K. K." "And the bright memory is alive ...". To the 110th anniversary of the birth of R. V. Mertslin // Publishing house of "PND", vol. 21, No. 6, 2013. p. 108-121.
- "Ilyin K. K., Trubetskov D. I." Mertslin Roman Viktorovich. 1903-1971: To the 100th anniversary of his birth // Publishing house of Saratov university Nov. ser. 2003. Vol. 3, issue 1. p. 14.
- "Ilyin K. K. " Scientific heritage of R. V. Mertslin and the development of Physico-chemical analysis at Saratov University // Physico-chemical analysis of liquid-phase systems: Thesis report to the International conf. Saratov: Saratov Publishing House. un., 2003. p. 11.
- Mertslin Roman Viktorovich // "Kostitsyn V. I." Rectors of Perm University. 1916-2006. 2nd edition, reprint. and add. / Perm. un. Perm, 2006. 352 p. 172-184.
- "Ilyin K. K., Sinegubova S. I." A brief sketch of the life and work of N. I. Nikurashina // Natalia Ivanovna Nikurashina (1916-1985). Biobibliogr. decree. / comp. L. P. Poymanova; ed. by A.V. Zyuzin. Saratov: ZNB SSU, 2006. 52 p. (Scientists of Saratov University. Bio-bibliographic materials).
- Mertslin R. V. // Saratov Regional Universal Scientific Library
- "Nikurashina N. I., Ilyin K. K." Scientist, teacher, public figure. To the 80th anniversary of the birth of R. V. Mertslin // Physico-chemical analysis of monogenic and heterogeneous multicomponent systems. Saratov: Publishing House of SSU, 1983. Part 1. p. 3-10.
- "Rogozhnikov C. I., Ilyin K. K." Roman Viktorovich Mertslin. Touches to the portrait of a scientist, teacher, public figure // Bulletin of Perm University. Chemistry series. 2016. Issue 2(22). p. 6-16.
- Roman Viktorovich Mertslin // "Semenov V. N." Rectors of Saratov University: facts of life and activity. Saratov: Sarat Publishing House. un., 1999. p. 232-247.
- Chemical Faculty of Saratov State University. Saratov: Scientific Book, 2004. p. 71.
- "Chernyshevsky D. V." Rector Mertslin // New Times in Saratov, No. 24(39), July 4–10, 2003.
- "Shulgina N. P., Mochalova N. K., Kotomtseva M. G." Department of Inorganic Chemistry and its scientific directions from 1916 to 2011 // Bulletin of Perm University. Chemistry series. 2011. Issue 2(2). p. 4-18.

| Preceded by Bukirev, Alexander Ilyich | Rector Perm University; 1941–1945 | Succeeded by Bukirev, Alexander Ilyich |
| Preceded by Ponomarev, Alexander Alexandrovich | Rector Saratov Chernyshevsky State University; 1950–1965 | Succeeded by Lebedev, Valentin Grigorievich |
