= Russian Foundation for Basic Research =

Russian government agency in charge of science funding

- Российский фонд фундаментальных исследований
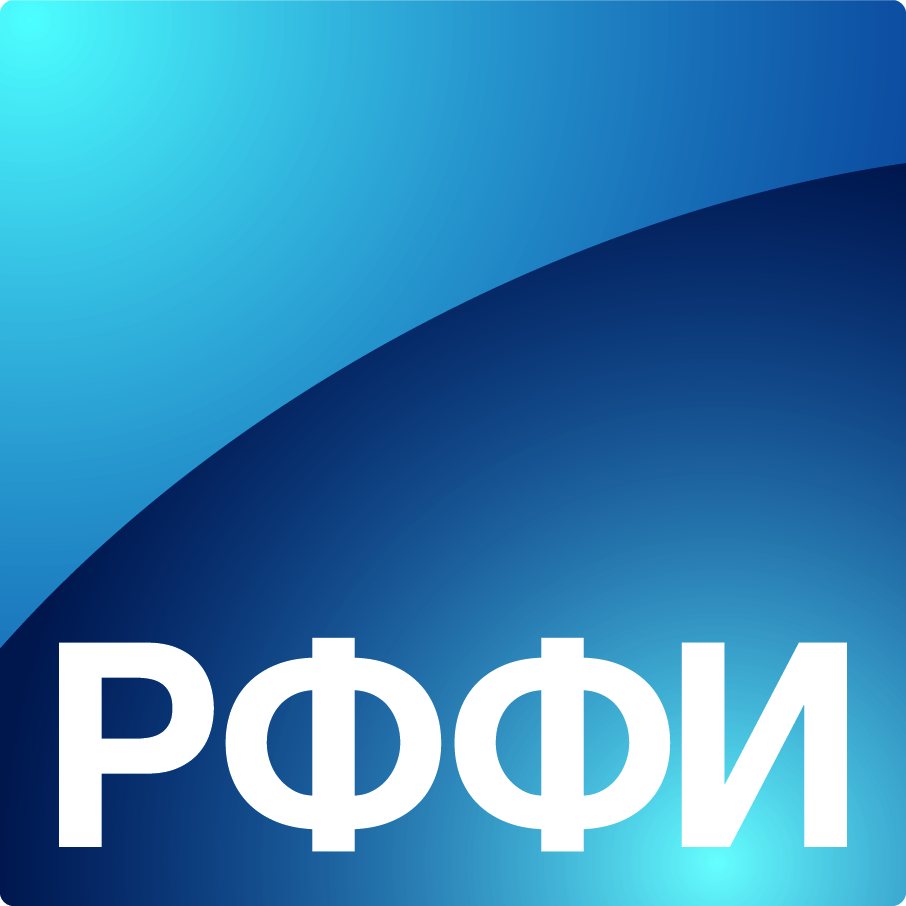
- Abbreviation: RFFI
- Formation: April 27, 1992; 34 years ago
- Location: Moscow, Russia
- Website: rfbr.ru

Russian Foundation for Basic Research (RFBR) is a national science funding body of the Russian government created on 27 April 1992 by a decree of the President of Russia.

== Activities ==
"The RFBR provides on a competitive basis financial support to individual scientists and research teams, enabling them to select research topics independently, to set up academic teams, and to concentrate resources on the most promising research projects."

The Russian Foundation for Basic Research financially sponsors conferences and research, provides collective bargaining in negotiating access to research databases for Russian research institutions, and co-hosts the Scopus Awards with Elsevier for Russian scientists who score high in Elsevier's academic productivity and citation metrics and are strongly involved in RFBR's programs and grants.

RFBR research grants are usually only available to Russian researchers and their international collaborators.

== International collaboration ==
RFBR collaborates with other research foundations around the world, including CRDF Global, the National Science Foundation and National Institutes of Health in the United States, the French National Center for Scientific Research, the German Research Foundation (Note: The Russian Science Foundation has also formed partnerships with the German Research Foundation.) the Royal Society of the United Kingdom, the Iran National Science Foundation, the Indian Ministry of Science and Technology, the Ministry of Science, Technology and Environment of the Republic of Cuba, the Academy of Finland, the Research Council of Norway, and the King Abdulaziz City for Science and Technology in Saudi Arabia.

=== International joint projects ===
BRICS STI Framework Programme
BRICS is an association of the governments of Brazil, Russia, India, China and South Africa which have met annually since 2009. In 2015, BRICS members completed a memorandum of understanding on collaboration in science, technology, and innovation. The Russian Foundation for Basic Research is one of several Russian state agencies which are implementing these collaborations.

Lake Elgygytgyn
While no Russian agency is a member of the International Continental Scientific Drilling Program, RFBR financially sponsors the International Drilling Program's work at Lake Elgygytgyn.
e-ASIA Joint Research Program
The Russian Foundation for Basic Research is a member of the e-ASIA Joint Research Program, an effort to promote innovation in science and technology in the East Asian region as a means of spurring economic development.
Global Research Council
The RFBR be co-hosted the 2018 annual meeting of the Global Research Council with the National Research Foundation of Korea.

== Presidents ==
- Vladislav Panchenko, 2008-

== Related Russian government organizations ==
For a chart of Russian government organizations on science and technology, see Perret, J.K. (2013). Knowledge as a driver of regional growth in the Russian Federation. Springer. p. 73. ISBN 978-3-642-40279-1.

- Presidential Council for Science and Education
- Ministry of Education and Science of the Russian Federation
- Federal Agency for Scientific Organizations - Created in 2013 and controls Russian Academy of Sciences property
- Russian Science Foundation - Established by Vladimir Putin in 2013 to support basic research and the development of science research teams
- Russian Academy of Sciences - "Russia’s primary basic-research organization"
- Skolkovo Foundation - "Russia's flagship science foundation and a pet project of... Dmitry Medvedev" which primarily has been developing a technology-focused district outside Moscow,
- Rosatom - Involved in nuclear energy research
- Rusnano - a nanotechnology investment company created by the Russian government
- Russian Foundation for Humanities
- Foundation for Assistance to Small Innovative Enterprises - founded in 1994
- Russian Fund for Technological Development
- State Committee on Science and Technology - Active until at least 1998 See State Committee of the Soviet Union.
