= Perm State University =

Public university in Perm, Perm Krai, Russia

- Motto: Vivat, Crescat, Floreat
- Type: Public
- Established: 14 October 1916
- President: Dr. Vladimir Malanin
- Rector: Dr. Dmitriy Krasilnikov (interim)
- Faculty: 1,800
- Undergraduates: 18,000
- Location: Perm, Perm Krai, Russia; 58.0075°N 56.1867°E Building details
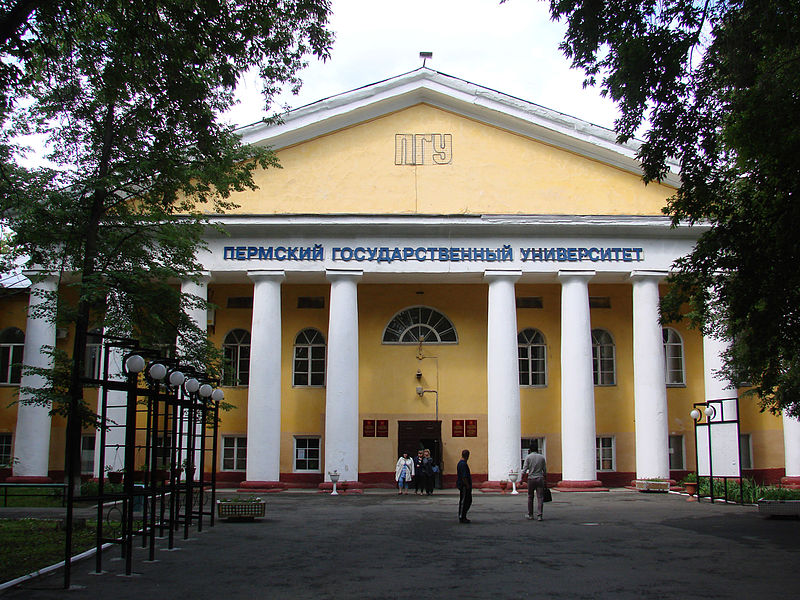
- Campus: Urban
- Website: www.psu.ru

University rankings

Regional – Overall
- QS Emerging Europe and Central Asia: 231-240 (2022)

Perm State University (now Perm State National Research University; Russian: Пермский университет, Пермский государственный университет, Пермский государственный национальный исследовательский университет, romanised: Permskiy gosudarstvennyy universitet, Permskiy gosudarstvennyy natsionalynyy issledovatelskyy universitet) or PSU, PSNRU (Russian: ПГУ, ПГНИУ, romanised: PGU, PGNIU), is located in the city of Perm, Perm Krai, Russia. Founded in 1916, it claims to be one of the oldest universities in the Ural and eastern territories of Russia. Its current rector is Dmitriy Krasilnikov.

== History ==
Perm State University was founded on 14 October 1916. Its origins lie in the opening of a branch of St. Petersburg University in the city of Perm. This decision of the Russian government was in tune with the strategy of the cultural and geopolitical development of the Urals economic region. The idea of a center of higher education in the Urals was supported by D.I. Mendeleev, A.S.Popov, D.N.Mamin-Sibiryak, A.G.Denisov-Uralsky and other public figures.

A mass shooting occurred at the university on 20 September 2021, by a law student at the university, resulting in six deaths and 23 injuries.

After the 2022 Russian invasion of Ukraine, European and UK partners of the university took a break from student internships and programmes with them. The University of Oxford in the UK announced the suspension of preparations for the summer school.

== Academics ==
Today, the university includes 12 faculties, 77 departments and 2 branches. The total number of students was 11,432 in the 2010/2011 academic year, including 7,607 full-time students. The university provides training of scientific specialists in 56 postgraduate specializations (there are about 250 postgraduate students) and 6 doctoral specializations. There are 14 dissertation councils, including 11 councils for the defence of doctoral theses.

Academic activities were conducted by 1229 researchers in 2009, including 164 doctors of sciences, professors and 480 candidates of sciences, associate professors. The academic staff includes 4 academicians and 3 corresponding members of the Russian Academy of Sciences, 1 corresponding member of the Russian Academy of Education, 15 honoured science figures of the Russian Federation and 10 honoured workers of higher education of the Russian Federation. 10 academics hold the status of Distinguished Professor at Perm State University.

Perm State University cooperated with foreign partners and international organisations, within the framework of which professors and students of PSU are sent abroad on long-term, mutually agreed with programmes with universities in other countries and international organisations, Perm is visited by professors and students from other universities. Partners of the university are Oxford University (until 2022), many French university centres (University of Aix-Marseilles, Grenoble-Alpes, Nancy I, Paris III), universities in the USA (Louisville), Central European countries and Australia. The university cooperates with the European Commission, the World Bank, the Ministry of Science and Culture of Lower Saxony and several other organisations.

== University rankings ==
At the end of August 2018, PSU entered the ranking of the best universities in the Eurasian region, compiled by the British publication Times Higher Education, ranking 61–70.

According to the QS University Rankings: BRICS (Best BRICS Universities) study published on 8 July 2015, PSU was ranked 24th in the Russian list of leading higher education institutions, ahead of several universities with national research and federal research status.

== Faculties ==
As of 2008, the university had 12 faculties:

- Faculty of Mechanics and Mathematics
- Faculty of Physics
- Faculty of Chemistry
- Faculty of Biology
- Faculty of Geology
- Faculty of Geography
- Faculty of History and Politology
- Faculty of Philology
- Faculty of Philosophy and Sociology
- Faculty of Economics
- Faculty of Law
- Faculty of Modern Foreign Languages and Literatures

== Notable alumni and faculty ==
- Vladimir Barsukov, Soviet ichthyologist and a specialist in the systematics of Scorpaeniformes
- Vladimir Nikolayevich Beklemishev, Soviet zoologist and entomologist
- Nikita Belykh, Russian politician, former leader of the Union of Right Forces, currently governor of Kirov Oblast
- Abram Samoilovitch Besicovitch (Besikovitch) (1891–1970) was a Russian-Jewish mathematician, who worked mainly in England. He was appointed professor at the University of Perm in 1917.
- Elena Braverman, Russian, Israeli, and Canadian mathematician
- Leonid Brekhovskikh, Soviet-Russian oceanographist
- Georgi Burkov, Soviet film actor
- Sergei Chernikov, Russian mathematician
- Georgii Frederiks, Russian geologist
- Alexander Friedmann, Russian mathematician and cosmologist
- Vladimir Gelfand, Soviet soldier and diarist
- Nina Gorlanova, Russian novelist
- Boris Grekov, Soviet historian
- Alexander-Paul Henckel, Russian biologist. Founder of Perm State University Botanical gardens. Author of Brockhaus and Efron Encyclopedic Dictionary.
- Zulya Kamalova, Tatar singer currently residing in Australia
- Vladimir Kostitsyn, Russian geophysicist
- Yuri Alexandrovich Orlov, Russian and Soviet zoologist, paleontologist
- Vladimir Porfiriev, Soviet geologist
- Victor Pavlovich Protopopov, Ukrainian-Soviet psychiatrist
- Maxim Reshetnikov, Russian politician, Minister of Economic Development, former Governor of Perm Krai
- Boris Schwanwitsch, Russian-Soviet entomologist
- Grigory Abramovich Shajn, Russian-Soviet astronomer
- Nikolay Shaklein, Russian politician, former governor of Kirov Oblast
- Valentin Stepankov, the first prosecutor general of the Russian Federation
- Jacob Tamarkin, Russian-American mathematician
- Lina Fazylovna Rakhmatullina, Russian mathematician
- Dmitry Rybolovlev, Russian cardiologist and oligarch
- George Vernadsky, Russian-American historian
- Ivan Matveyevich Vinogradov, Russian-Soviet mathematician
- Augustinas Voldemaras, first Prime Minister of Lithuania in 1918
- Leonid Yuzefovich, Russian writer
- Mark Zakharov, Soviet-Russian theatrical and film director
- Timur Bekmansurov, perpetrator of the 2021 shooting.

== See also ==
- List of modern universities in Europe (1801–1945)
- List of universities in Russia
- Academic staff of Perm State University
- Perm State University alumni
