= Administrative divisions of Perm Oblast =

Administrative districts of former Russian federal subject

Perm Oblast Russia

Administrative structure (as of November 30, 2005)
- Districts: 27
- Cities/towns: 24
- Urban-type settlements: 38
- Selsovets: 446

Municipal structure (as of 2002)
- Rural settlements: 3,253 (inhabited); 322 (uninhabited)

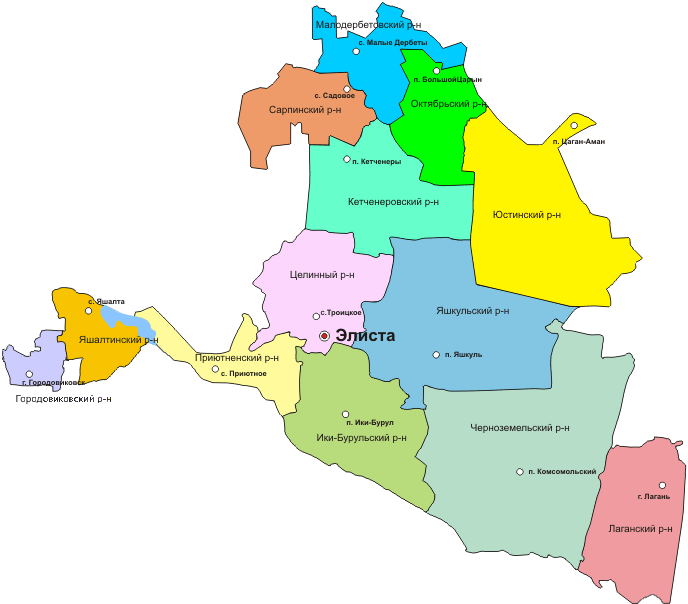
Map of the Republic of Kalmykia

Perm Oblast was a federal subject of Russia until November 30, 2005. On December 1, 2005 it was merged with Komi-Permyak Autonomous Okrug to form Perm Krai.

== Administrative and municipal divisions ==
- Urban-type settlements under the federal government management:
  - Zvyozdny (Звёздный)
- Cities and towns under the oblast's jurisdiction:
  - Perm (Пермь) (administrative center)
    - city districts:
      - Dzerzhinsky (Дзержинский)
      - Industrialny (Индустриальный)
      - Kirovsky (Кировский)
      - Leninsky (Ленинский)
      - Motovilikhinsky (Мотовилихинский)
      - Ordzhonikidzevsky (Орджоникидзевский)
      - Sverdlovsky (Свердловский)
  - Alexandrovsk (Александровск)
    - Urban-type settlements under the town's jurisdiction:
      - Vsevolodo-Vilva (Всеволодо-Вильва)
      - Yayva (Яйва)
    - with 5 selsovets under the town's jurisdiction.
  - Berezniki (Березники)
    - with 1 selsovet under the city's jurisdiction.
  - Chaykovsky (Чайковский)
    - with 10 selsovets under the town's jurisdiction.
  - Chusovoy (Чусовой)
    - Urban-type settlements under the town's jurisdiction:
      - Kalino (Калино)
      - Komarikhinsky (Комарихинский)
      - Lyamino (Лямино)
      - Skalny (Скальный)
      - Verkhnechusovskiye Gorodki (Верхнечусовские Городки)
    - with 6 selsovets under the town's jurisdiction.
  - Dobryanka (Добрянка)
    - Urban-type settlements under the town's jurisdiction:
      - Polazna (Полазна)
    - with 18 selsovets under the town's jurisdiction.
  - Gremyachinsk (Гремячинск)
    - Urban-type settlements under the town's jurisdiction:
      - Shumikhinsky (Шумихинский)
      - Usva (Усьва)
      - Yubileyny (Юбилейный)
  - Gubakha (Губаха)
    - Urban-type settlements under the town's jurisdiction:
      - Shirokovsky (Широковский)
      - Ugleuralsky (Углеуральский)
  - Kizel (Кизел)
    - Urban-type settlements under the town's jurisdiction:
      - Severny-Kospashsky (Северный-Коспашский)
      - Shakhta (Шахта)
      - Tsentralny-Kospashsky (Центральный-Коспашский)
      - Yuzhny-Kospashsky (Южный-Коспашский)
  - Krasnokamsk (Краснокамск)
    - Urban-type settlements under the town's jurisdiction:
      - Overyata (Оверята)
    - with 6 selsovets under the town's jurisdiction.
  - Kungur (Кунгур)
  - Lysva (Лысьва)
    - with 13 selsovets under the town's jurisdiction.
  - Solikamsk (Соликамск)
- Districts:
  - Bardymsky (Бардымский)
    - with 17 selsovets under the district's jurisdiction.
  - Beryozovsky (Берёзовский)
    - with 12 selsovets under the district's jurisdiction.
  - Bolshesosnovsky (Большесосновский)
    - with 14 selsovets under the district's jurisdiction.
  - Chastinsky (Частинский)
    - with 11 selsovets under the district's jurisdiction.
  - Cherdynsky (Чердынский)
    - Towns under the district's jurisdiction:
      - Cherdyn (Чердынь)
    - Urban-type settlements under the district's jurisdiction:
      - Nyrob (Ныроб)
    - with 17 selsovets under the district's jurisdiction.
  - Chernushinsky (Чернушинский)
    - Towns under the district's jurisdiction:
      - Chernushka (Чернушка)
    - with 18 selsovets under the district's jurisdiction.
  - Gornozavodsky (Горнозаводский)
    - Towns under the district's jurisdiction:
      - Gornozavodsk (Горнозаводск)
    - Urban-type settlements under the district's jurisdiction:
      - Biser (Бисер)
      - Kusye-Alexandrovsky (Кусье-Александровский)
      - Medvedka (Медведка)
      - Novovilvensky (Нововильвенский)
      - Pashiya (Пашия)
      - Promysla (Промысла)
      - Sarany (Сараны)
      - Stary Biser (Старый Бисер)
      - Tyoplaya Gora (Тёплая Гора)
    - with 1 selsovet under the district's jurisdiction.
  - Ilyinsky (Ильинский)
    - Towns under the district's jurisdiction:
      - Chyormoz (Чёрмоз)
    - Urban-type settlements under the district's jurisdiction:
      - Ilyinsky (Ильинский)
    - with 16 selsovets under the district's jurisdiction.
  - Karagaysky (Карагайский)
    - with 16 selsovets under the district's jurisdiction.
  - Kishertsky (Кишертский)
    - with 14 selsovets under the district's jurisdiction.
  - Krasnovishersky (Красновишерский)
    - Towns under the district's jurisdiction:
      - Krasnovishersk (Красновишерск)
    - with 11 selsovets under the district's jurisdiction.
  - Kungursky (Кунгурский)
    - with 26 selsovets under the district's jurisdiction.
  - Kuyedinsky (Куединский)
    - with 22 selsovets under the district's jurisdiction.
  - Nytvensky (Нытвенский)
    - Towns under the district's jurisdiction:
      - Nytva (Нытва)
    - Urban-type settlements under the district's jurisdiction:
      - Novoilyinsky (Новоильинский)
      - Uralsky (Уральский)
    - with 11 selsovets under the district's jurisdiction.
  - Ochyorsky (Очёрский)
    - Towns under the district's jurisdiction:
      - Ochyor (Очёр)
    - Urban-type settlements under the district's jurisdiction:
      - Pavlovsky (Павловский)
    - with 10 selsovets under the district's jurisdiction.
  - Okhansky (Оханский)
    - Towns under the district's jurisdiction:
      - Okhansk (Оханск)
    - with 8 selsovets under the district's jurisdiction.
  - Oktyabrsky (Октябрьский)
    - Urban-type settlements under the district's jurisdiction:
      - Oktyabrsky (Октябрьский)
      - Sars (Сарс)
    - with 22 selsovets under the district's jurisdiction.
  - Ordinsky (Ординский)
    - with 14 selsovets under the district's jurisdiction.
  - Osinsky (Осинский)
    - Towns under the district's jurisdiction:
      - Osa (Оса)
    - with 13 selsovets under the district's jurisdiction.
  - Permsky (Пермский)
    - Urban-type settlements under the district's jurisdiction:
      - Yugo-Kamsky (Юго-Камский)
    - with 29 selsovets under the district's jurisdiction.
  - Sivinsky (Сивинский)
    - with 11 selsovets under the district's jurisdiction.
  - Solikamsky (Соликамский)
    - with 14 selsovets under the district's jurisdiction.
  - Suksunsky (Суксунский)
    - Urban-type settlements under the district's jurisdiction:
      - Suksun (Суксун)
    - with 14 selsovets under the district's jurisdiction.
  - Uinsky (Уинский)
    - with 13 selsovets under the district's jurisdiction.
  - Usolsky (Усольский)
    - Towns under the district's jurisdiction:
      - Usolye (Усолье)
    - Urban-type settlements under the district's jurisdiction:
      - Oryol (Орёл)
    - with 10 selsovets under the district's jurisdiction.
  - Vereshchaginsky (Верещагинский)
    - Towns under the district's jurisdiction:
      - Vereshchagino (Верещагино)
    - with 13 selsovets under the district's jurisdiction.
  - Yelovsky (Еловский)
    - with 10 selsovets under the district's jurisdiction.

== See also ==
- Administrative divisions of Komi-Permyak Autonomous Okrug
- Administrative divisions of Perm Krai
