= Administrative divisions of Perm Krai =

Administrative districts of Russian federal subject

Perm Krai Russia
- Administrative center: Perm

Administrative structure (as of 2013)
- Districts: 33
- Cities/towns: 25
- Urban-type settlements: 27
- Selsovets: 0

Municipal structure (as of 2002)
- Rural settlements: 3,961 (inhabited); 342 (uninhabited)

Map of the Perm Krai (with numbered)

This is a list of administrative divisions of Perm Krai, a krai (federal subject) of Russia. Overall, the krai has 33 districts, 25 cities or towns, 27 "urban-type settlements", 3,961 rural localities, and 342 "uninhabited rural localities".

== Administrative and municipal divisions ==
Map

- ✪ - part of Komi-Permyak Okrug (Ко́ми-Пермя́цкий о́круг)

Division		Structure		OKATO	OKTMO	Urban-type settlement/ district-level town*
Division		Administrative	Municipal	OKATO	OKTMO	Urban-type settlement/ district-level town*
Zvyozdny (Звёздный)		urban-type settlement (ZATO)	urban okrug	57 563	57 763	
Perm (Пермь)		city	urban okrug	57 401	57 701	
↳	Dzerzhinsky (Дзержинский)	(under Perm)	—N/a	57 401	—N/a	
↳	Industrialny (Индустриальный)	(under Perm)	—N/a	57 401	—N/a	
↳	Kirovsky (Кировский)	(under Perm)	—N/a	57 401	—N/a	
↳	Leninsky (Ленинский)	(under Perm)	—N/a	57 401	—N/a	
↳	Motovilikhinsky (Мотовилихинский)	(under Perm)	—N/a	57 401	—N/a	
↳	Ordzhonikidzevsky (Орджоникидзевский)	(under Perm)	—N/a	57 401	—N/a	
↳	Sverdlovsky (Свердловский)	(under Perm)	—N/a	57 401	—N/a	
Alexandrovsk (Александровск)		city	okrug	57 405	57 605	Vsevolodo-Vilva (Всеволодо-Вильва); Yayva (Яйва)
Berezniki (Березники)		city	urban okrug	57 408	57 708	
Gremyachinsk (Гремячинск)		city	urban okrug	57 412	57 615	Usva (Усьва)
Gubakha (Губаха)		city	urban okrug	57 415	57 717	Shirokovsky (Широковский); Ugleuralsky (Углеуральский)
Dobryanka (Добрянка)		city	urban okrug	57 416	57 615	Polazna (Полазна)
Kizel (Кизел)		city	urban okrug	57 418	57 623	
Krasnokamsk (Краснокамск)		city	urban okrug	57 420	57 627	Overyata (Оверята)
Kungur (Кунгур)		city	urban okrug	57 422	57 722	
Lysva (Лысьва)		city	urban okrug	57 427	57 726	
Solikamsk (Соликамск)		city	urban okrug	57 430	57 730	
Chaykovsky (Чайковский)		city	urban okrug	57 435	57 654	
Chusovoy (Чусовой)		city	urban okrug	57 440	57 658	Kalino (Калино); Lyamino (Лямино); Skalny (Скальный)
✪	Kudymkar (Кудымкар)	special city	urban okrug	57 141	57 851	
Bardymsky (Бардымский)		district		57 204	57 604	
Beryozovsky (Берёзовский)		district	orkug	57 206	57 606	
Bolshesosnovsky (Большесосновский)		district		57 208	57 608	
Vereshchaginsky (Верещагинский)		district	urban okrug	57 212	57 612	Vereshchagino (Верещагино) town*
✪	Gaynsky (Гайнский)	special district	orkug	57 114	57 814	
Gornozavodsky (Горнозаводский)		district	urban okrug	57 214	57 614	Gornozavodsk (Горнозаводск) town*; Biser (Бисер); Kusye-Alexandrovsky (Кусье-Александровский); Medvedka (Медведка); Novovilvensky (Нововильвенский); Pashiya (Пашия); Promysla (Промысла); Sarany (Сараны); Stary Biser (Старый Бисер); Tyoplaya Gora (Тёплая Гора)
✪	Kosinsky (Косинский)	special district	orkug	57 117	57 817	
Yelovsky (Еловский)		district		57 218	57 618	
✪	Kochyovsky (Кочёвский)	special district	orkug	57 119	57 819	
Ilyinsky (Ильинский)		district	urban okrug	57 220	57 620	Chyormoz (Чёрмоз) town*
✪	Kudymkarsky (Кудымкарский)	special district	orkug	57 121	57 821	
Karagaysky (Карагайский)		district		57 222	57 622	
Kishertsky (Кишертский)		district		57 224	57 624	
✪	Yurlinsky (Юрлинский)	special district	okrug	57 125	57 825	
Krasnovishersky (Красновишерский)		district	urban okrug	57 226	57 626	Krasnovishersk (Красновишерск) town*
✪	Yusvinsky (Юсьвинский)	special district	okrug	57 127	57 827	
Kuyedinsky (Куединский)		district		57 228	57 628	
Kungursky (Кунгурский)		district		57 230	57 630	
Nytvensky (Нытвенский)		district	urban okrug	57 234	57 634	Nytva (Нытва) town*; Novoilyinsky (Новоильинский); Uralsky (Уральский)
Oktyabrsky (Октябрьский)		district	urban okrug	57 236	57 636	Oktyabrsky (Октябрьский); Sars (Сарс)
Ordinsky (Ординский)		district	okrug	57 238	57 638	
Osinsky (Осинский)		district	urban orkug	57 240	57 640	Osa (Оса) town*
Okhansky (Оханский)		district	urban okrug	57 242	57 642	Okhansk (Оханск) town*
Ochyorsky (Очёрский)		district	urban okrug	57 244	57 644	Ochyor (Очёр) town*; Pavlovsky (Павловский)
Permsky (Пермский)		district		57 246	57 646	
Sivinsky (Сивинский)		district		57 248	57 648	
Solikamsky (Соликамский)		district	urban okrug	57 250	57 650	
Suksunsky (Суксунский)		district	urban okrug	57 251	57 651	Suksun (Суксун)
Uinsky (Уинский)		district	okrug	57 252	57 652	
Usolsky (Усольский)		district	(under Berezniki)	57 253	57 708	Usolye (Усолье) town*
Chastinsky (Частинский)		district		57 255	57 655	
Cherdynsky (Чердынский)		district	urban okrug	57 256	57 656	Cherdyn (Чердынь) town*; Nyrob (Ныроб)
Chernushinsky (Чернушинский)		district	urban okrug	57 257	57 657	Chernushka (Чернушка) town*

== See also ==
- Administrative divisions of Perm Oblast
- Administrative divisions of Komi-Permyak Autonomous Okrug
