= Dmitry Tambasov =

Russian serial killer (born 1983)

- Born: Dmitry Aleksandrovich Tambasov; 2 February 1983 (age 43); Perm, Perm Oblast, RSFSR (present-day Perm Krai, Russia)
- Other name: "The Perm Chikatilo"
- Conviction: Murder
- Penalty: 7.5 years imprisonment (2003); Life imprisonment; commuted to 25 years imprisonment (2009)

Details
- Victims: 3 (confirmed); 4 (confessed); 9–11 (suspected)
- Span of crimes: 2001–2002
- Country: Russia
- State: Perm
- Date apprehended: 3 May 2003
- Imprisoned at: IK-12 Penal Colony, Shirokovsky, Perm Krai

Dmitry Aleksandrovich Tambasov (Russian: Дмитрий Александрович Тамбасов), known as The Perm Chikatilo (Russian: Пермский Чикатило), is a Russian serial killer and rapist who committed at least three rape-murders in Perm from 2001 to 2002. After his arrest, he confessed to committing one additional murder, but investigators suspect that he is responsible for a total of nine to eleven.

Convicted for his known murders, Tambasov was initially sentenced to life imprisonment, but this was later commuted to 25 years imprisonment.

== Early life ==
Dmitry Tambasov was born on 2 February 1983, in Perm, the middle child in a family with two female siblings. From an early age, he began to show signs of mental illness as, according to his mother, he suffered from panic attacks at night. Despite this, he was never properly treated, as the doctor advised his mother to treat Dmitry with valerian.

His younger sister was born with a disability, due to which Tambasov's parents and grandmother spent most of the time tending to her and ignoring him. His mother would later claim that he suffered from some sort of debilitating abnormality, as he would start banging his head against the wall or an iron bunk if reproached in any way; he repeatedly tried to commit suicide and self-harmed via cutting his skin with a knife and other sharp objects.

Tambasov studied at a specialized school for troubled teenagers to become a baker. According to investigator Dmitry Baichurin, Tambasov would claim that at age 16, he had a sexual relationship with one of the teachers, who was a sadomasochist and liked anal sex, which greatly affected his psycho-emotional state. A year prior to this, Tambasov also had sex with a female relative of the same age as him.

=== First imprisonment and adult life ===
The pedagogical staff at the school characterized Tambasov negatively, while teachers noted that he had no interest in the educational process and barely studied. Due to the fact that he was tall, Tambasov bullied other students and was aggressive, leading to him eventually being arrested on charges of robbery and assault.

After spending several months behind bars, Tambasov changed several jobs within a few months, mostly consisting of low-skilled labour, but did not stay anywhere for a long time due to his dream of having a prestigious occupation. During this period, he worked as a watchman at a factory, a loader and a security guard at local discos and Palaces of Culture. In his spare time, Tambasov often visited computer clubs and collected erotic content in both photo and video form. He was also known for being sexually attracted to older women.

Tambasov's friends and acquaintances described him ambiguously. One of these friends, Andrei, claimed that the pair had a strange hobby—they sometimes strangled each other for sexual pleasure. Another friend claimed that he had sadomasochist tendencies, with her claiming that Tambasov carved her name onto his body with glass—while doing this, he seemed to experience sexual pleasure.

His former lover, who was several years older than him, claimed that Tambasov wanted to marry her and adopt her children, but she broke off the relationship with him because Tambasov's mother disapproved of it. She later said that he attempted another suicide attempt soon afterwards.

=== Military draft and dismissal ===
In the spring of 2001, Tambasov was drafted into the Russian Armed Forces. During a medical check-up, a psychiatrist expressed doubts about his sanity due to the presence of multiple cuts on his hands, but nevertheless, Tambasov was found fit to serve and transferred to a Naval base in Severomorsk. During his service, Tambasov was bullied by older servicemen and was even beaten up several times, as a result of which he was sent to the infirmary. He later claimed that the chief medical officer was often drunk and sexually harassed him on an almost nightly basis.

After being discharged from the infirmary, Tambasov was taken to the psychiatric ward of the Severomorsk Hospital, where he made another suicide attempt. Eventually, as a result of repeated investigations by the medical commission, he was declared unfit to serve and was discharged on medical grounds. He was escorted back to Perm by fellow servicemen, with a military certificate noting that he suffered from very volatile emotional disorders, was unable to adapt to military life and suffered from BPD.

Following the discharge, Tambasov's mental state deteriorated dramatically. In December 2001, he was severely beaten on two occasions. On the second occasion, he went to a disco where he befriended some men who offered him vodka. Tambasov was unable to remember what happened next, but he was beaten up by the men and then left barefoot on the street, where he was found by a random passer-by. The man then contacted Tambasov's mother, who immediately came to pick up her son.

== Arrest for rape ==
On the evening of 3 May 2003, Tambasov came across a young woman standing at the "Avtovozkal" trolleybus station while she was en route to her home. He approached the woman and started chatting with her, learning that she planned to go visit a friend at a disco near the Telta Palace of Culture. Upon hearing this, Tambasov offered that they go there together, claiming that a friend of his was there already. The woman agreed, after which Tambasov hailed a cab and first went to his house with his new acquaintance to get some money, after which they both went to the Palace of Culture.

Upon arriving there, Tambasov immediately started attempting to get her drunk, but the woman refused and tried to leave. He then started groping and harassing her, but eventually relented and offered to call a cab. When they left the club, he unsuccessfully attempted to persuade her to go someplace else, kissing her and peeking under her skirt. When she continued resisting, he grabbed her by the neck and dragged her behind the Palace of Culture and into a ravine. There, Tambasov raped her several times using various objects before forcing her down a sewer manhole, where he continued his abuse. The woman said that he threatened to kill her and that she was not his first victim.

In the midst of their struggle, Tambasov put his hand in the victim's mouth, whereupon she bit him and managed to push him off. She then clawed at his face and immediately ran up the ravine, all the while he shouted at her to come back and that he wouldn't kill her. After running away, the woman went back to the Palace of Culture and asked the guards for help, who then called the police.

Law enforcement arrived quickly and interviewed the victim, who provided them with a description of her assailant, noting the injury on his finger. For reasons unknown, Tambasov did not leave the scene and instead returned to the disco, where he was promptly arrested. At the subsequent interrogation, he denied responsibility and accused the woman of giving false testimony, claiming that the sexual act was consensual. According to him, he accidentally grabbed her neck and scratched it during an orgasm, causing her to jump up and run away.

=== Trial and conviction ===
When he was eventually put on trial, Tambasov continued to deny responsibility and demanded that he be acquitted of all charges. The rape victim said at the trial that Tambasov's parents went to her house on several occasions, threatening her to change her testimony and even marry their son. Ultimately, in August, he was found guilty of rape and infecting the victim with a venereal disease, for which he was given a sentence of 7 years and 5 months.

Following his conviction, Tambasov was transferred to serve his sentence at Penal Colony No. 22 in Kushmangort.

== Exposure as a serial killer ==
In the summer of 2008, Tambasov was visited by investigators who claimed that they had evidence tying him to the murder of 39-year-old Tatyana Nikitenko, who had been killed in the fall of 2002. After being presented with a condom found near the crime scene that had his fingerprints on it, Tambasov agreed to cooperate with investigators and was soon transferred out of the colony to a detention centre. In September 2008, he wrote four separate confessions in which he confessed to four murders and three rapes.

=== Yulia Shulenina ===
Tambasov claimed that his first victim was 19-year-old Yulia Shulenina, a native of Gremyachinsk who was studying at the Slavyanov College. She previously studied at the Perm State University, but had to transfer due to her family's worsening financial situation due to the death of her father in February 2000. While at the university, Shulenina developed a reputation for sleeping around with men. On March 14, 2001, Tambasov went to her room, where, according to Shulenina's roommate, they sat in the dormitory's kitchen smoking, eating ice cream and consuming alcoholic beverages. At some point, the roommate had an argument with Shulenina over her alcoholism and promiscuous sex life before eventually leaving. Tambasov claimed that he and Shulenina had consensual sex shortly afterwards, but he began hurting her. She then tried to resist, upon which Tambasov began strangling her, at one point inserting a carrot into her anus. After killing her, he put a blanket over her body and left.

Shulenina's corpse was discovered by her roommate in the afternoon of the next day when he returned from classes. During the examination of the crime scene, the investigators found a smudged palm print and also made a fairly detailed sketch using the roommate's testimony, but this did not help them identify the perpetrator at the time. At the end of 2001, the case was suspended.

=== Tatyana Mekhonoshina ===
Tambasov's second victim was 36-year-old saleswoman Tatyana Mekhonoshina, who worked at a clothing pavilion in Perm's central market but lived in the village of Overyata with her mother. She had no children and was divorced. On 5 August 2002, Mekhonoshina told her mother and friends that she would go to a disco in the evening to celebrate Railwayman's Day and would return in the early morning by train. Tambasov met Mekhonoshina at the disco, after which they went for a walk along the embankment towards the bridge. Once down on the shore, they decided to go for a swim, after which they had consensual sex. Tambasov claimed that at some point he suggested to Mekhonoshina that they have anal sex, but once she rejected the offer, he strangled her. He then got dressed, threw a jacket over her body, stole all valuables from her handbag and left.

After her body was found, the Department of Internal Affairs initially refused to classify the cause of death as homicide, but after an autopsy revealed that she was strangled, it was reclassified and investigated as such.

=== Tatyana Nikitenko ===
Tambasov's third victim was 39-year-old Tatyana Nikitenko, whose murder would eventually lead to his implication in the killings. In her youth, Nikitenko studied to be a director at the Palace of Culture, and since 1983, she had been the director of the Gagarin Cultural Center's theatre. In 1989, due to internal disagreements, she was forced to resign from her position. Throughout the 1990s, she changed a number of professions, including a janitor; a pool cleaner for the Spartak arena and director for the Arnold Rainik children's dance ensemble. While attending the theatre, Nikitenko liked to watch performances orchestrated by Yevgeny Panfilov.

By the late 1990s, Nikitenko began to show signs of mental illness, hiding some sort of documents in her apartment and talking to invisible people. Due to her deteriorating mental health, she cut off contact with her acquaintances, quit her job and began living as a vagrant, spending almost all of her free time at a public garden near the Opera and Ballet Theater.

On November 22, 2002, around approximately midnight, Tambasov was passing by the Opera and Ballet Theater when he noticed Nikitenko standing near a monument of Vladimir Lenin. Deciding that he wanted to have sex with her, he sat on a bench next to her and, after making sure that the place was deserted, proceeded to put her in a chokehold and drag her behind the building. Nikitenko fiercely resisted during the subsequent sexual assault, which caused Tambasov to strangle her to death and steal her purse. In his confession, he claimed that the death was unintentional and that he only wanted to render her unconscious, claiming to have only realized that she was dead when he saw a news report about the case.

=== "Veselova" ===
In his confessions, Tambasov claimed to have murdered a fourth woman surnamed "Veselova". He claimed to have met her at a mini-market on Druzhby Square, after which they went down to a ravine near the "Zvezda" publishing house. After making sure they were alone, Tambasov attacked the woman, but as she resisted him fiercely, he strangled her and threw the body down a slope.

He initially claimed that this killing was accidental, but soon after confessing, Tambasov stopped cooperating with authorities about this case. As a result, they were unable to collect enough evidence about his involvement in this case.

=== Rapes ===
In addition to these murders, Tambasov admitted responsibility for at least three rapes.

The first of these took place in either 2002 or 2003, with the victim being a prostitute he had lured to an abandoned house near Lenin Street. There, they came across a garbage chute—upon seeing this, the woman said that she wanted to leave. Tambasov then grabbed her by the neck and said that he would strangle her—the victim stopped resisting but somehow fell down the chute. Tambasov claimed that she was still alive, but only heard the rattling of some garbage cans before leaving.

In the summer of 2002, Tambasov was walking near a kindergarten in the Leninsky City District when he noticed a woman drinking alcohol by herself. He attacked and strangled her into unconsciousness, and after finishing the assault, he left the scene.

A few days after this incident, he came across a young woman sitting at a café tent near the Kama embankment. When he asked her what was wrong, the woman told Tambasov that she was lost and looking for someone, whereupon he told her that he could help her search for this person. After searching around for some time, they started walking down a slope that Tambasov said was a "shortcut", only for him to grab her by the neck, drag her to a nearby isolated corner and raped her. Unlike the other victims, Tambasov claimed that he did not attempt to strangle this woman—he instead ordered her to count to 100 after the sexual assault was over, after which he quickly ran up the embankment and fled the area.

=== Possible other crimes ===
After undergoing a polygraph test, investigators started suspecting that Tambasov might be responsible for other murders, possibly between nine and eleven in total. An expert in the field, Askold Petrov, said that Tambasov was unique in the sense that his cruelty in carrying out the crimes drastically escalated with each new attack.

== Trial ==
In late 2008 and early 2009, Tambasov took part in investigative experiments under escort to recreate the murders of Shulenina, Mekhonoshina and Nikitenko. Shortly before the trial began, he retracted his testimony and claimed that he was tortured into confessing by the officers. In the following days, he invoked Article 51 of the Russian Constitution and refused to testify against himself. While awaiting trial, his cellmates complained that he constantly asked them for erotic magazines and masturbated often. Prisoners also claimed that Tambasov changed his original confession after his parents' reaction to it, as they were against him testifying.

In early 2009, Tambasov's lawyers filed a petition for a forensic psychiatric examination, which was granted. This examination concluded with the findings that even though Tambasov indeed suffered from mental abnormalities, he was considered legally sane at the time of carrying out the crimes. The report stated that Tambasov had an inflated ego and justified his crimes due to his "unfavourable circumstances"; cut himself to suppress nervous excitement; complained that Andrei Chikatilo and other serial killers were "unfairly recognized as sane" and that he supposedly suffered from amnesia and had memory blocks. Psychiatrists were convinced that Tambasov suffered from a mixed personality disorder and numerous sexual deviations, as well as deluding himself that everything around him was a dream.

Ultimately, Tambasov was found guilty on all counts on 30 July 2009, via jury verdict. He was subsequently sentenced to life imprisonment, and during sentencing, he asked the court for leniency and refused to have the last word.

=== Appeals and commutation ===
In 2010, Tambasov filed an appeal to the Supreme Court in which he argued that the jury was prejudiced against him due to the prosecutor revealing to them his past criminal record, as well as the court refusing to allow him to question the defence's witnesses and to take into account several mitigating circumstances such as his confessions and young age. At the end of the appeal, he cited his positive characterization from prison and that he had "taken the path of correction".

After reviewing the appeal, the Supreme Court accepted it and commuted his life sentence to 25 years imprisonment.

During the re-investigation into his crimes, questions were raised about why Tambasov's fingerprints were not found on the condom used in the Nikitenko murder, even though his fingerprints were in a database due to his 2003 rape conviction. The trial prosecutor was initially unable to explain this, but in 2022, investigator Gulnara Abibulaeva gave an interview to the media in which she clarified that the reason for this was the due to the lack of advanced technology such as DNA in the early 2000s.

== Current status ==
After his resentencing, Tambasov was transferred to the IK-12 Penal Colony in Shirokovsky. He applied for parole in August 2022 and requested that his remaining sentence be commuted to forced labour, but this was denied by the Perm Krai Court.

While in prison, Tambasov married, but constantly got in trouble with prison administration. A report from the staff indicated that since 2020, he has worked as a bread cutter, day watchman and woodworker, but also had a total of 26 disciplinary incidents and 13 commendations during his detainment. It was also reported that he was noted as being prone to attempt escapes, self-harm, attempting suicide and doing sexual acts and gestures near female prison staff.

In April 2024, it was reported that a number of convicts at IK-12 had signed contracts with the Ministry of Defence to be sent to fight in the war in Ukraine—with allegations that Tambasov was among them. However, prison administration issued a statement clarifying that this was not the case and that Tambasov continues to be incarcerated. His projected release date is approximated to be sometime in the summer of 2028.

== See also ==
- List of Russian serial killers
