= Chusovskoy =

Chusovskoy (masculine), Chusovskaya (feminine), or Chusovskoye (neuter) may refer to:

- Chusovskoy Municipal District, a municipal formation which the town of krai significance of Chusovoy in Perm Krai, Russia is incorporated as
- Chusovskoye Urban Settlement, a municipal formation in Chusovskoy Municipal District of Perm Krai, Russia, which the town of Chusovoy, one work settlement, and two rural localities are incorporated as
- Chusovskoy (rural locality) (Chusovskaya, Chusovskoye), several rural localities in Russia
- Lake Chusovskoye, a lake in Perm Krai, Russia
