= Chusovoy =

Town in Perm Krai, Russia

Chusovoy Чусовой
- Town
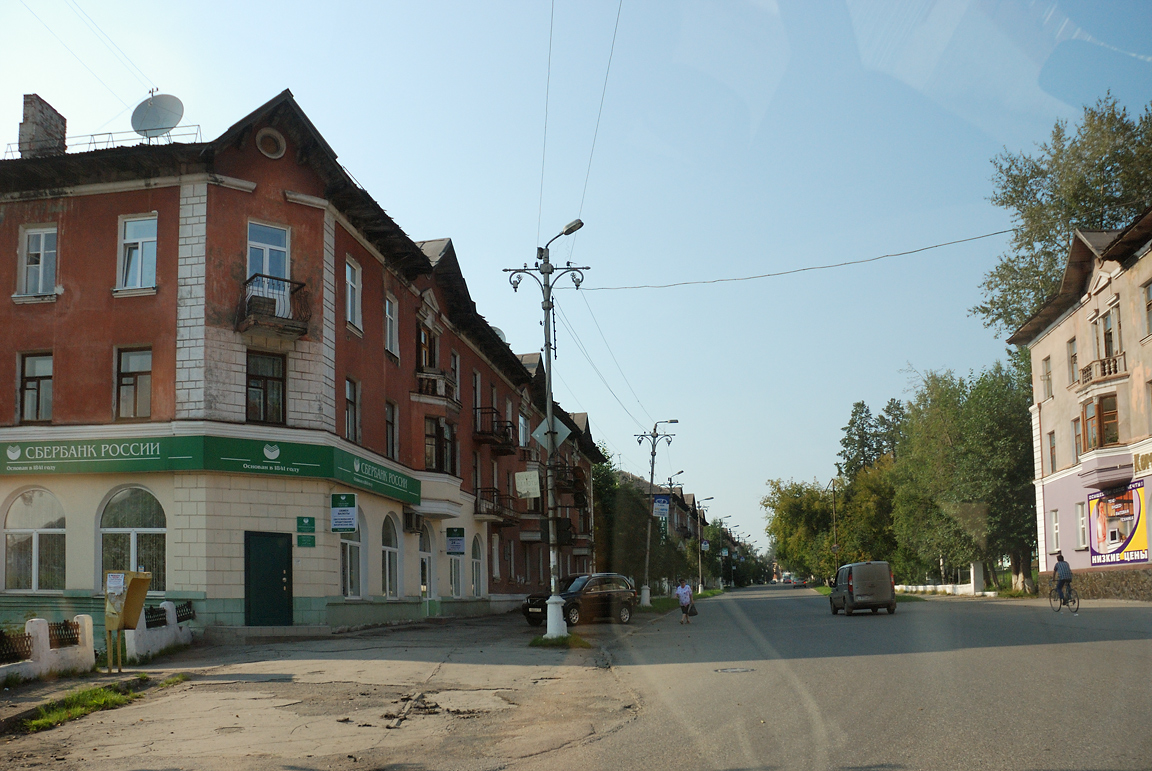
- In Chusovoy

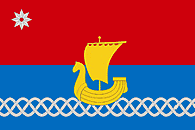
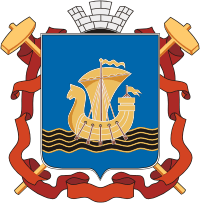
- Flag Coat of arms
- Interactive map of Chusovoy
- Location of Chusovoy Chusovoy (Perm Krai)
- Coordinates: 58°19′N 57°49′E
- Country: Russia
- Federal subject: Perm Krai
- Founded: 1878
- Town status since: 1933
- Elevation: 170 m (560 ft)

Population (2010 Census)
  - Total: 46,735
  - Estimate (2025): 44,047 (−5.8%)

Administrative status
  - Subordinated to: town of krai significance of Chusovoy (Chusovoy Urban Okrug)
  - Capital of: town of krai significance of Chusovoy

Municipal status
  - Municipal district: Chusovskoy Municipal District
  - Urban settlement: Chusovskoye Urban Settlement
  - Capital of: Chusovskoy Municipal District, Chusovskoye Urban Settlement
- Time zone: UTC+5 (MSK+2)
- Postal codes: 618200–618206, 618249
- OKTMO ID: 57658101001

Chusovoy (Russian: Чусово́й; Komi Permyak: Чусва, Čusva) is a town in Perm Krai, Russia, located at the confluence of the Usva and Vilva Rivers with the Chusovaya River, 140 kilometers (87 mi) east of Perm, the administrative center of the krai. Population: 46,735 (2010 census); 51,615 (2002 census); 57,874 (1989 Soviet census).

== History ==
It was founded in 1878 during the construction of the Gornozavodsk railway and with the building of the metallurgical plant. In 1933, it was granted town status. After the construction of the bridge over the Chusovaya River in 1964, the town started to develop on the river's left bank.

== Administrative and municipal status ==
Within the framework of administrative divisions, it is, together with three work settlements (Kalino, Lyamino, and Skalny) and seventy rural localities, incorporated as the town of krai significance of Chusovoy (Chusovoy Urban Okrug) —an administrative unit with the status equal to that of the districts. As a municipal division, the town of Chusovoy, together with the work settlement of Lyamino and two rural localities, is incorporated as Chusovskoye Urban Settlement within Chusovskoy Municipal District and serves as the municipal district's administrative center. The remaining two work settlements and sixty-eight rural localities are grouped into seven rural settlements within Chusovskoy Municipal District.

== Economy ==
The main industry of the town is ferrous metallurgy. There are also engineering, metalworking, production of building materials and others. Metallurgical Plant of Chusovoy makes it a company town.

=== Transportation ===
Chusovoy is a major transportation hub. Gornozavodsk railway and the railway that runs to Solikamsk connect the town with Perm and other towns in the eastern part of the krai. Kungur–Solikamsk highway runs through Chusovoy. In recent years, it was connected with Perm by a new road through Polazna.
