= Gremyachinsky =

Gremyachinsky (masculine), Gremyachinskaya (feminine), or Gremyachinskoye (neuter) may refer to:

- Gremyachinsky Municipal District, a municipal formation which the town of krai significance of Gremyachinsk in Perm Krai, Russia is incorporated as
- Gremyachinskoye Urban Settlement, a municipal formation in Gremyachinsky Municipal District of Perm Krai, Russia, which the town of Gremyachinsk and two rural localities are incorporated as
- Gremyachinsky (rural locality), a rural locality (a settlement) in Toguchinsky District of Novosibirsk Oblast, Russia
