= Ust-Koyva =

Ust-Koyva Усть-Койва
- Settlement
- Location within Perm Krai Location within Russia
- Coordinates: 58°13′N 58°12′E
- Country: Russia
- Region: Perm Krai
- District: Gornozavodsky District
- Time zone: UTC+5:00

Ust-Koyva (Russian: Усть-Койва) is a rural locality (a settlement) in Gornozavodsky District, Perm Krai, Russia. The population was 18 as of 2010. There are 9 streets.

== Geography ==
Ust-Koyva is located 28 km southwest of Gornozavodsk (the district's administrative centre) by road. Kusye-Alexandrovsky is the nearest rural locality.

== See also ==
- Koyva
