= Srednyaya Usva =

Srednyaya Usva Средняя Усьва
- Settlement
- Location within Perm Krai Location within Russia
- Coordinates: 58°59′N 58°55′E
- Country: Russia
- Region: Perm Krai
- District: Gornozavodsky District
- Time zone: UTC+5:00

Srednyaya Usva (Russian: Средняя Усьва) is a rural locality (a settlement) in Gornozavodsky District, Perm Krai, Russia. The population was 499 as of 2010. There are 14 streets.

== Geography ==
Srednyaya Usva is located 117 km northeast of Gornozavodsk (the district's administrative centre) by road. Medvedka is the nearest rural locality.
