= Gornozavodsky =

Gornozavodsky (masculine), Gornozavodskaya (feminine), or Gordozavodskoye (neuter) may refer to:

- Gornozavodsky District, a district of Perm Krai, Russia
- Gornozavodskoye Urban Settlement, a municipal formation which the town of Gornozavodsk and two rural localities in Gornozavodsky District of Perm Krai, Russia are incorporated as
- Gornozavodskoye (rural locality), a rural locality (a selo) in Kirovsky District of Stavropol Krai, Russia
