= Ancestral Land =

- Genre: Drama
- Written by: Milena Fadeyeva
- Directed by: Milena Fadeyeva
- Starring: Yura Borisov; Arina Zharkova; Maksim Kerin; Alina Lanina; Aleksei Kravchenko; Svetlana Kolpakova
- Composer: Ivan Uryupin

Production
- Producers: Vladyslav Riashyn; Tatyana Statsman
- Cinematography: Radik Askarov

Ancestral Land (Отчий берег) is a 2017 Russian drama television series directed by Milena Fadeyeva. It stars Yura Borisov.

== Plot ==
The series tells the story of the Morozov family, which is divided into two distinct parts as a result of the Great Patriotic War. They find themselves in different corners of the Soviet Union and are forced to take unexpected actions.

== Cast ==
- Yura Borisov as Stepan Morozov
- Arina Zharkova as Varvara Morozova
- Maksim Kerin as Aleksei Morozov
- Alina Lanina as Alyona Morozova
- Aleksei Kravchenko as Makar Morozov
- Svetlana Kolpakova as Darya Morozova

== Production ==
Filming took place in Kusye-Alexandrovsky, Pashiya, Perm, Kungur, and Alabino.
