= Skalny =

Skalny (Russian: Скальный; masculine), Skalnaya (Скальная; feminine), or Skalnoye (Скальное; neuter) is the name of several inhabited localities in Russia.

Urban localities

- Skalny, Perm Krai, a work settlement under the administrative jurisdiction of the town of krai significance of Chusovoy in Perm Krai

Rural localities

- Skalny, Rostov Oblast, a settlement in Bogurayevskoye Rural Settlement of Belokalitvinsky District in Rostov Oblast
