= Koyva (settlement) =

Koyva Койва
- Settlement
- Location within Perm Krai Location within Russia
- Coordinates: 58°25′N 58°29′E
- Country: Russia
- Region: Perm Krai
- District: Gornozavodsky District
- Time zone: UTC+5:00

Koyva (Russian: Койва) is a rural locality (a settlement) in Gornozavodsky District, Perm Krai, Russia. The population was 302 as of 2010. There are 21 streets.

== See also ==
- Ust-Koyva
