= Panfilov =

Panfilov (Russian: Панфилов) may refer to:

== People ==
- Alexei Panfilov, Soviet lieutenant general
- Gleb Panfilov, Russian film director
- Ivan Panfilov, Soviet World War II general
- Vyacheslav Panfilov, Ukrainian footballer
- Yevgeni Panfilov, Russian choreographer

== Places ==
- Panfilov, former name of Zharkent, a town in Kazakhstan
- Panfilov, Pavlodar Region, Kazakhstan
- Panfilov, Kyrgyzstan, a village in Chuy Region, Kyrgyzstan
- Panfilov District (disambiguation)
- Panfilov Peak in the Tian Shan
