= Ust-Tyrym =

Ust-Tyrym Усть-Тырым
- Settlement
- Location within Perm Krai Location within Russia
- Coordinates: 58°16′N 58°30′E
- Country: Russia
- Region: Perm Krai
- District: Gornozavodsky District
- Time zone: UTC+5:00

Ust-Tyrym (Russian: Усть-Тырым) is a rural locality (a settlement) in Gornozavodsky District, Perm Krai, Russia. The population was 61 as of 2010. There are 11 streets.

== Geography ==
Ust-Tyrym is located 23 km southeast of Gornozavodsk (the district's administrative centre) by road. Kusye-Alexandrovsky is the nearest rural locality.
