= Ust-Tiskos =

Ust-Tiskos Усть-Тискос
- Settlement
- Location within Perm Krai Location within Russia
- Coordinates: 58°26′N 59°08′E
- Country: Russia
- Region: Perm Krai
- District: Gornozavodsky District
- Time zone: UTC+5:00

Ust-Tiskos (Russian: Усть-Тискос) is a rural locality (a settlement) located in Gornozavodsky District of Perm Krai, Russia. The population was 13 as of 2010.
