= Shumikhinsky =

Shumikhinsky (masculine), Shumikhinskaya (feminine), or Shumikhinskoye (neuter) may refer to:

- Shumikhinsky District, a district of Kurgan Oblast, Russia
- Shumikhinsky (rural locality), a rural locality (a settlement) in Perm Krai, Russia
