= Novoilyinsky (inhabited locality) =

Novoilyinsky (Russian: Новоильи́нский; masculine), Novoilyinskaya (Новоильи́нская; feminine), or Novoilyinskoye (Новоильи́нское; neuter) is the name of several inhabited localities in Russia.

Urban localities

- Novoilyinsky, Perm Krai, a work settlement in Nytvensky District of Perm Krai

Rural localities

- Novoilyinsky, Kemerovo Oblast, a settlement in Gornyatskaya Rural Territory of Leninsk-Kuznetsky District of Kemerovo Oblast
- Novoilyinskoye, Nizhny Novgorod Oblast, a village in Chashchikhinsky Selsoviet of Krasnobakovsky District of Nizhny Novgorod Oblast
- Novoilyinskoye, Perm Krai, a selo in Permsky District of Perm Krai
- Novoilyinskaya, a village in Syrtinsky Selsoviet of Kizilsky District of Chelyabinsk Oblast
