= Klestovo =

Klestovo Клестово
- Village
- Location within Perm Krai Location within Russia
- Coordinates: 59°20′N 57°14′E
- Country: Russia
- Region: Perm Krai
- District: Alexandrovsky District
- Time zone: UTC+5:00

Klestovo (Russian: Клестово) is a rural locality (a village) in Yayvinskoye Urban Settlement, Alexandrovsky District, Perm Krai, Russia. The population was 20 as of 2010.

== Geography ==
Klestovo is located 35 km northwest of Alexandrovsk (the district's administrative centre) by road. Yayva is the nearest rural locality.
