= Krasnokamsky =

Krasnokamsky (masculine), Krasnokamskaya (feminine), or Krasnokamskoye (neuter) may refer to:

- Krasnokamsky District, an administrative and municipal district of the Republic of Bashkortostan, Russia
- Krasnokamsky Municipal District, a municipal formation which the town of krai significance of Krasnokamsk in Perm Krai, Russia is incorporated as
- Krasnokamskoye Urban Settlement, a municipal formation in Krasnokamsky Municipal District of Perm Krai, Russia, which the town of Krasnokamsk is incorporated as
