= Yevropeyskaya =

Yevropeyskaya Европейская
- Settlement
- Location within Perm Krai Location within Russia
- Coordinates: 58°27′N 59°16′E
- Country: Russia
- Region: Perm Krai
- District: Gornozavodsky District
- Time zone: UTC+5:00

Yevropeyskaya (Russian: Европейская) is a rural locality (a settlement) in Gornozavodsky District, Perm Krai, Russia. The population was 25 as of 2010. There are 3 streets.
