= Novoilyinsky =

Novoilyinsky (masculine), Novoilyinskaya (feminine), or Novoilyinskoye (neuter) may refer to:

- Novoilyinsky City District, a city district of Novokuznetsk, Kemerovo Oblast, Russia
- Novoilyinsky (inhabited locality) (Novoilyinskaya, Novoilyinskoye), name of several inhabited localities in Russia
