= USVA =

USVA may refer to:

== Geography ==
- Usva, an urban locality in Perm Krai, Russia
- Usva (river), a river in Perm Krai, Russia
- Virginia, a state in the United States (US) with the initials VA

== Other uses ==
- United States Department of Veterans Affairs
- United States Department of Veterans Affairs emblems for headstones and markers
- USVA, initials of the former name of Valenciennes FC, a French association football club
