= Skopkortnaya =

Skopkortnaya Скопкортная
- Settlement
- Location within Perm Krai Location within Russia
- Coordinates: 59°23′N 57°49′E
- Country: Russia
- Region: Perm Krai
- District: Alexandrovsky District
- Time zone: UTC+5:00

Skopkortnaya (Russian: Скопкортная) is a rural locality (a settlement) and the administrative center of Skopkortnenskoye Rural Settlement, Alexandrovsky District, Perm Krai, Russia. The population was 335 as of 2010. There are 13 streets.

== Geography ==
Skopkortnaya is located 48 km northeast of Alexandrovsk (the district's administrative centre) by road. Chanvinsky karyer is the nearest rural locality.
