= Medvedka =

Urban settlement in Perm Krai, Russia

Medvedka Медведка
- Urban-type settlement
- Interactive map of Medvedka
- Location of Medvedka Medvedka (Perm Krai)
- Coordinates: 58.7415°N 59.1012°E
- Country: Russia
- Federal subject: Perm Krai
- Administrative district: Gornozavodsky District

Population (2010 Census)
  - Total: 370
  - Estimate (2023): 272 (−26.5%)
- Time zone: UTC+5 (MSK+2)
- Postal code: 618872
- OKTMO ID: 57614403051

Medvedka (Russian: Медве́дка) is an urban locality (an urban-type settlement) in Gornozavodsky District of Perm Krai, Russia. Population: 370 (2010 census); 816 (2002 census); 1,008 (1989 Soviet census).

It is situated by the Koyva river 37km north of Tyoplaya Gora.

The settlement originated at the site of diamond mining, which began here in 1946. It is mentioned in written sources since 1950. After the exhaustion of diamond deposits, the primary economic activity became logging.
