= Administrative divisions of Komi-Permyak Autonomous Okrug =

Administrative districts of former Russian federal subject

Komi-Permyak Autonomous Okrug Russia

Administrative structure (as of November 30, 2005)
- Districts: 6
- Cities/towns: 1
- Urban-type settlements: 0
- Selsovets: 76

Municipal structure (as of 2002)
- Rural settlements: 708 (inhabited); 20 (uninhabited)

Komi-Permyak Autonomous Okrug was a federal subject of Russia until November 30, 2005. On December 1, 2005, it was merged with Perm Oblast to form Perm Krai. During the transitional period of 2006–2008, it retains a special status within Perm Krai.

== Administrative and municipal divisions ==
- Cities and towns under the autonomous okrug's jurisdiction:
  - Kudymkar (Кудымкар) (administrative center)
- Districts:
  - Gaynsky (Гайнский)
    - with 12 selsovets under the district's jurisdiction.
  - Kochyovsky (Кочёвский)
    - with 7 selsovets under the district's jurisdiction.
  - Kosinsky (Косинский)
    - with 9 selsovets under the district's jurisdiction.
  - Kudymkarsky (Кудымкарский)
    - with 20 selsovets under the district's jurisdiction.
  - Yurlinsky (Юрлинский)
    - with 12 selsovets under the district's jurisdiction.
  - Yusvinsky (Юсьвинский)
    - with 16 selsovets under the district's jurisdiction.

== See also ==
- Administrative divisions of Perm Oblast
- Administrative divisions of Perm Krai
