= Tyoplaya Gora =

Tyoplaya Gora Тёплая Гора
- Urban-type settlement
- Location of Tyoplaya Gora
- Location of Tyoplaya Gora Tyoplaya Gora (Perm Krai)
- Coordinates: 58°31′N 59°04′E
- Country: Russia
- Federal subject: Perm Krai
- Administrative district: Gornozavodsky District
- Founded: 1880
- Urban-type settlement status since: 1928

Population (2010 Census)
  - Total: 3,306
- Time zone: UTC+5 (MSK+2)
- Postal code(s): 618870
- OKTMO ID: 57614406051

Tyoplaya Gora (Russian: Тёплая Гора́) is an urban locality (an urban-type settlement) in Gornozavodsky District of Perm Krai, Russia, located on the western slopes of the Ural Mountains, on the Koyva River, 14 kilometers (8.7 mi) from the border with Sverdlovsk Oblast. Population: 3,306 (2010 Census); 3,860 (2002 Census); 4,558 (1989 Soviet census).

== History ==
In 1884, Count Shuvalov built the Teplogorský Ironworks. The first factory settlement appeared somewhat earlier. The settlement got its name from the Teplyaya mountain. The first settlers so-called the new "warm" place.

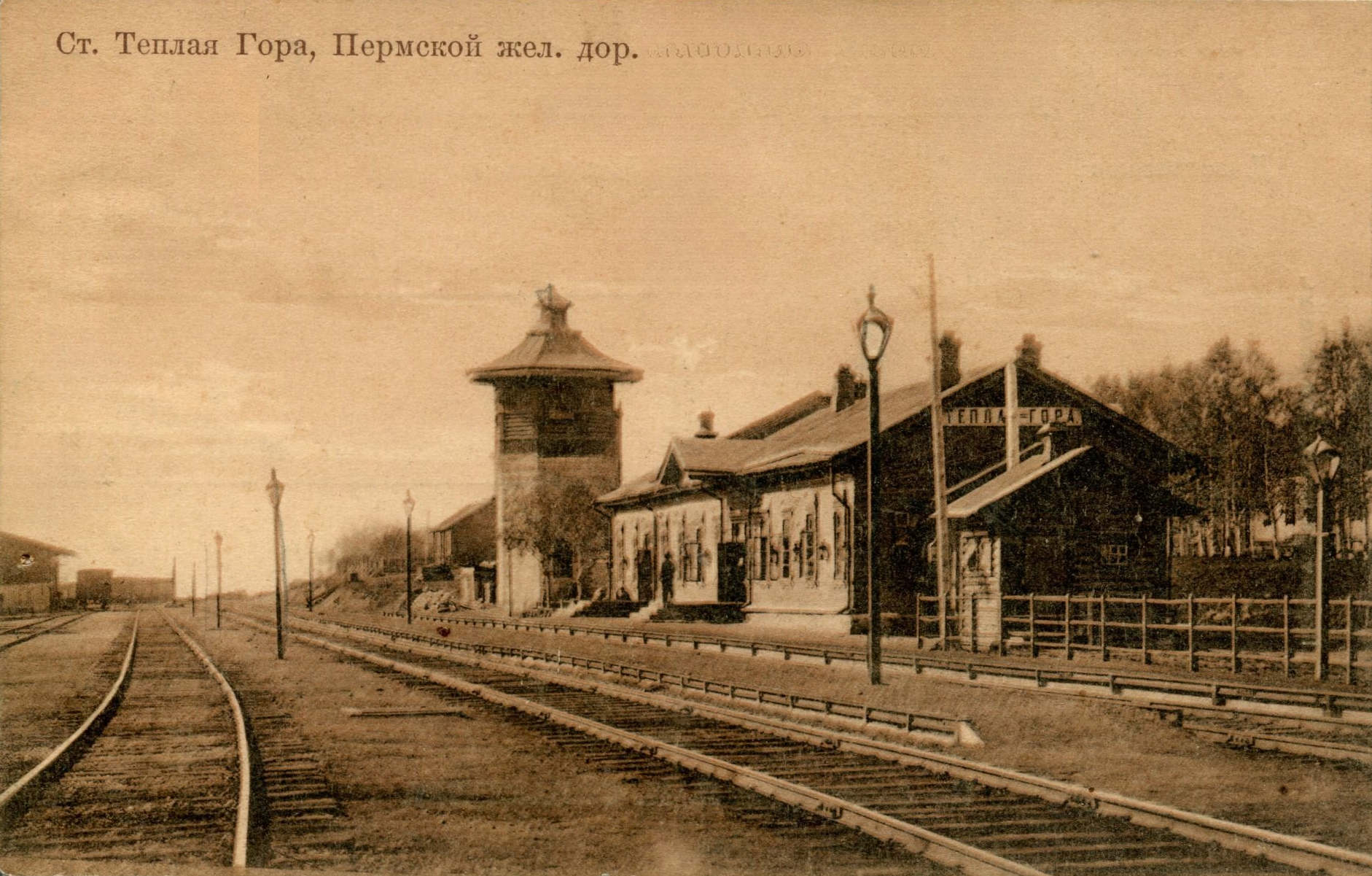
Tyoplaya Gora station in the early 20th century

In 1912 the first and the only Russian blast furnace with an elliptical profile of that time was built here. At the mines of Krestovozdvizhensky fields, near to settlement, in 1829 the first diamond in Russia has been found, gold and platinum were extracted industrial way.

Before the construction, Gornozavodskoy Uralian line in 1879 all finished goods of plants Biser, Teplyaya Gora and Kusye-Alexandrovsk were fused by barges to Koyva and Chusovaya to the Kama.

Settlement status – from August 27, 1928.

In 1956 plant was transformed to casting-mechanical.

Since December 1987, the crushed stone plant began to work.

== Transportation ==
A paved road connects Tyoplaya Gora with Gornozavodsk and Kachkanar.In addition to standard roads for motor vehicles, this region is also well connected by railway.
