= Alexandrovskoye Urban Settlement =

Urban settlement in Alexandrovsky District, Perm Krai, Russia

Coordinates: 59.3923°N 57.8078°E

Alexandrovskoye Urban Settlement (Russian: Алекса́ндровское городско́е поселе́ние) is a municipal formation within Alexandrovsky Municipal District of Perm Krai, Russia, which a part of the territory of the town of krai significance of Alexandrovsk is incorporated as. It is one of the three urban settlements in the municipal district.
