= Zagotovka =

Zagotovka Заготовка
- Settlement
- Location within Perm Krai Location within Russia
- Coordinates: 58°30′N 57°44′E
- Country: Russia
- Region: Perm Krai
- District: Gremyachinsky Urban okrug
- Time zone: UTC+5:00

Zagotovka (Russian: Заготовка) is a rural locality (a settlement) in Gremyachinsky Urban okrug, Perm Krai, Russia. The population was 2 as of 2010.

== Geography ==
Zagotovka is located 16 km southwest of Gremyachinsk (the district's administrative centre) by road. Yugo-Zapadny is the nearest rural locality.
