= Promysla =

Promysla Промысла
- Urban-type settlement
- Interactive map of Promysla
- Location of Promysla Promysla (Perm Krai)
- Coordinates: 58.5643°N 59.1564°E
- Country: Russia
- Federal subject: Perm Krai
- Administrative district: Gornozavodsky District

Population (2010 Census)
  - Total: 558
  - Estimate (2023): 383 (−31.4%)
- Time zone: UTC+5 (MSK+2)
- Postal code: 618871
- OKTMO ID: 57614406056

Promysla (Russian: Промысла) is an urban locality (an urban-type settlement) in Gornozavodsky District of Perm Krai, Russia. Population: 558 (2010 census); 747 (2002 census); 1,129 (1989 Soviet census).

== History ==
The settlement has been known since 1825, when gold placers were discovered on the Poludenka River. The original name of the settlement was "Krestovozdvizhenskie Zolotvennye Furs", Krestovozdvizhenskoe village. The head office of Krestovozdvizhenskie gold placers was situated in the settlement.

In 1829 the goldsmith Paul Popov discovered in the vicinity of the village the first diamond in Russia weighing 0.5 carats, for which he received a free hand.

Administrative status of township was received on July 30, 1943.
