= Gremyachinskoye Urban Settlement =

Gremyachinskoye Urban Settlement (Russian: Гремя́чинское городско́е поселе́ние) is a municipal formation (an urban settlement) within Gremyachinsky Municipal District of Perm Krai, Russia, which a part of the territory of the town of krai significance of Gremyachinsk is incorporated as. It is the only urban settlement in the municipal district.
