= Stary Biser =

Stary Biser Старый Бисер
- Urban-type settlement
- Interactive map of Stary Biser
- Location of Stary Biser Stary Biser (Perm Krai)
- Coordinates: 58.4129°N 58.8836°E
- Country: Russia
- Federal subject: Perm Krai
- Administrative district: Gornozavodsky District
- Founded: 1787

Population (2010 Census)
  - Total: 523
  - Estimate (2023): 328 (−37.3%)
- Time zone: UTC+5 (MSK+2)
- Postal code: 618861
- OKTMO ID: 57614401056

Stary Biser (Russian: Старый Бисер) is an urban locality (an urban-type settlement) in Gornozavodsky District of Perm Krai, Russia. Population: 523 (2010 census); 708 (2002 census);

== History ==
Stary Biser was founded in 1787 during the construction of an iron foundry that existed to the beginning of the 20th century. In the 1920s it was used as a basis for a shop of the shaped iron casting of the Teplogorsk Casting and Mechanical Plant.

In the settlement, there are two sites of the Biser Teplogorskiy factory (17th–19th century) and a house where the prominent activist of the RSDLP(b) Sergeyev lived.

In 1926, owing to the full exhaustion of local mines, the melting of pig-iron at Biserka metallurgical plant was stopped, and the plant itself was closed.

An urban-type settlement from 27 August 1928.
