= Novovilvensky =

Novovilvensky Нововильвенский
- Urban-type settlement
- Interactive map of Novovilvensky
- Location of Novovilvensky Novovilvensky (Perm Krai)
- Coordinates: 58.7149°N 58.7145°E
- Country: Russia
- Federal subject: Perm Krai
- Administrative district: Gornozavodsky District

Population (2010 Census)
  - Total: 177
  - Estimate (2023): 30 (−83.1%)
- Time zone: UTC+5 (MSK+2)
- Postal code: 618841
- OKTMO ID: 57614403056

Novovilvensky (Russian: Нововильвенский) is an urban locality (an urban-type settlement) in Gornozavodsky District of Perm Krai, Russia. Population: 177 (2010 census); 421 (2002 census); 1,066 (1989 Soviet census).
