= Panfilov District =

Panfilov District may refer to:

- Panfilov District, Kazakhstan
- Panfilov District, Kyrgyzstan
