= Kushmangort =

Kushmangort Кушмангорт
- Settlement
- Location within Perm Krai Location within Russia
- Coordinates: 60°25′N 56°05′E
- Country: Russia
- Region: Perm Krai
- District: Cherdynsky District
- Time zone: UTC+5:00

Kushmangort (Russian: Кушмангорт) is a rural locality (a settlement) in Cherdynsky District, Perm Krai, Russia. The population was 1,069 as of 2010. There are 6 streets.

== Geography ==
Kushmangort is located 24 km west of Cherdyn (the district's administrative centre) by road. Kolchug is the nearest rural locality.
