= Shumikhinsky (rural locality) =

Shumikhinsky Шумихинский
- Settlement
- Location within Perm Krai Location within Russia
- Coordinates: 58°44′N 57°41′E
- Country: Russia
- Region: Perm Krai
- District: Gremyachinsky Urban okrug
- Time zone: UTC+5:00

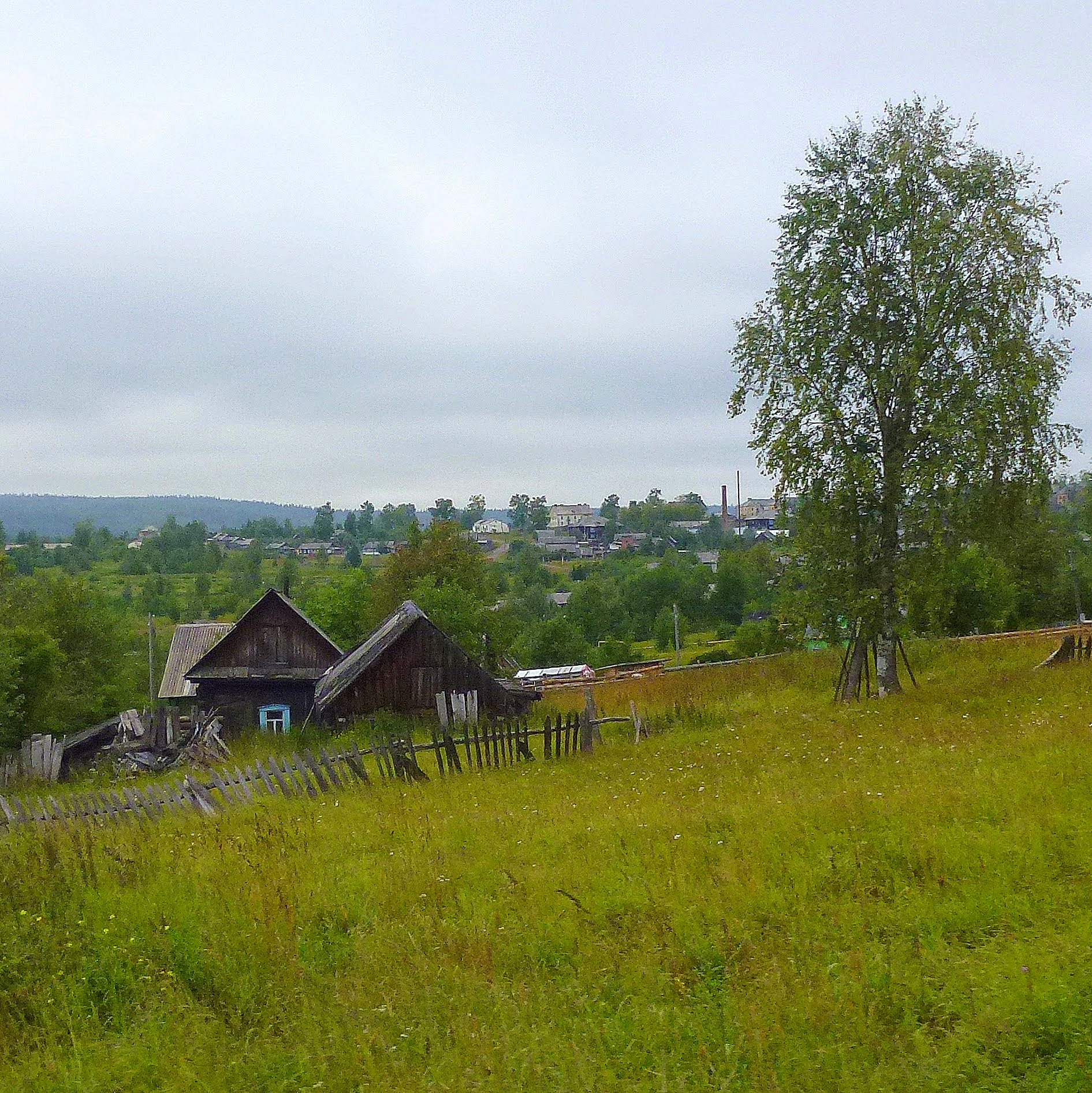
Shumikhinksy

Shumikhinsky (Russian: Шумихинский) is a rural locality (a settlement) in Gremyachinsky Urban okrug, Perm Krai, Russia. The population was 1,645 as of 2010. There are 31 streets.

== Geography ==
Shumikhinsky is located 32 km north of Gremyachinsk (the district's administrative centre) by road. Yubileyny is the nearest rural locality.
