= Sarany =

Sarany Сараны
- Urban-type settlement
- Interactive map of Sarany
- Location of Sarany Sarany (Perm Krai)
- Coordinates: 58.5467°N 58.7614°E
- Country: Russia
- Federal subject: Perm Krai
- Administrative district: Gornozavodsky District
- Founded: 1889

Population (2010 Census)
  - Total: 1,097
  - Estimate (2023): 868 (−20.9%)
- Time zone: UTC+5 (MSK+2)
- Postal code: 618850
- OKTMO ID: 57614405051

Sarany (Russian: Сараны) is an urban locality (an urban-type settlement) in Gornozavodsky District of Perm Krai, Russia. Population: 1,097 (2010 census); 1,255 (2002 census); 1,351 (1989 Soviet census).

Geologists are aware that Uvarovite was found there in the 20th century.

== History ==
The settlement arose in 1889 due to the discovery of a chromite deposit used in the chemical and ceramic industries. The extraction of chromites started in 1889. Over a century of mining, more than 10 million tonnes of chromite ore were produced.

The settlement has been an urban settlement since June 26, 1940.

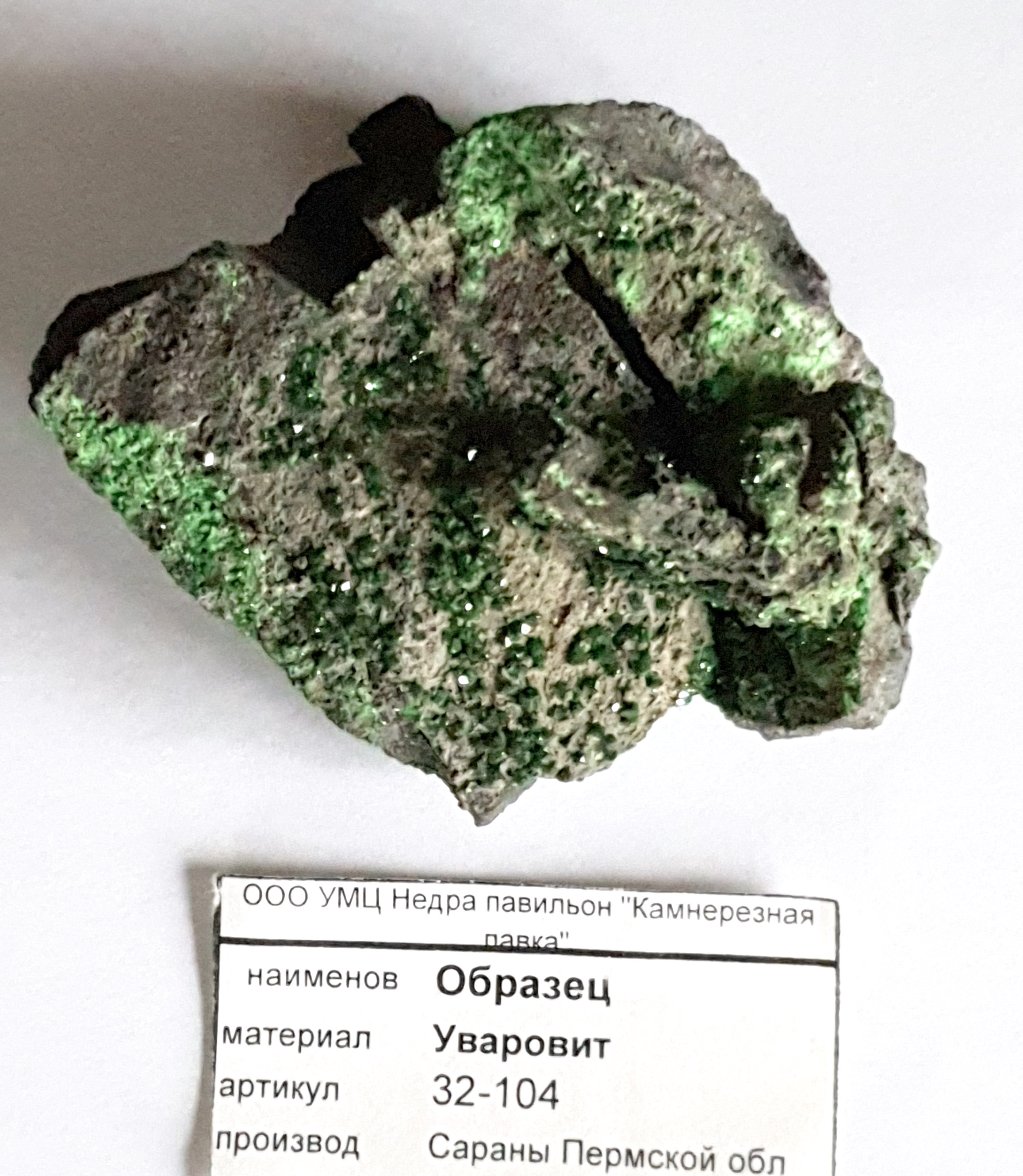
Uvarovite from Sarany, Perm, Russia
