= Chusovskoy (rural locality) =

Chusovskoy (Russian: Чусовской; masculine), Chusovskaya (Чусовская; feminine), or Chusovskoye (Чусовское; neuter) is the name of several rural localities in Russia.

== Modern localities ==
- Chusovskoy, Chelyabinsk Oblast, a settlement under the administrative jurisdiction of the Town of Verkhny Ufaley in Chelyabinsk Oblast
- Chusovskoy, Perm Krai, a settlement in Cherdynsky District of Perm Krai

== Alternative names ==
- Chusovskaya, alternative name of Chusovaya, a village in Verkhnepeskovsky Selsoviet of Kataysky District in Kurgan Oblast; 56°11′N 62°33′E
