= Yevgeni Panfilov =

Eugene (Yevgeni) Panfilov (Russian: Евгений Панфилов; 10 August 1955 – 13 July 2002) was a Russian choreographer.

== Biography ==
Panfilov was born on 10 August 1955 in the small village of Pyatkovo, which was then part of Arkhangelsk Oblast in the Russian SFSR of the Soviet Union. He was one of five sons of a rural schoolteacher. After being expelled from school for behavior issues, he worked in a kolkhoz and later became the director of a rural house of Culture. He then served in the Soviet Group of Forces in Germany, where he saw a showing at the Friedrichstadt-Palast that inspired him to pursue dance. He then briefly studied at the Hetman Petro Sahaidachnyi National Ground Forces Academy after his military service, but returned to the Russian SFSR soon after.

Panfilov was a graduate of the Institute of Culture in Perm and of GITIS, the state theatrical and dance institute in Moscow. His work was a combination of classical ballet and modern dance. He formed his first company, Impulse, in 1981 to explore modern dance. This was followed in 1987 by Experiment, and then in 1994 by the Yevgeny Panfilov Ballet.

His choreography is a mixture of many dance styles performed to music ranging from classical ballet's great composers to modern rock music. His works were often given eclectic titles, "Waltzes for the Dim-witted", for example.

Panfilov visited America in the early '90s where he premiered his work, Lolita.

Panfilov was stabbed to death by a burglar at his home in Perm on 13 July 2002. Soon after, a 23-year-old man from Krasnokamsk was convicted for his murder.

== Big Ballet ==
Panfilov is best known (outside of Russia) as the creator of the Big Ballet, a convention-busting dance company whose female members each have a minimum weight of 17 stones. The troupe's male members are all conventionally slender and athletic dancers.

The troupe was formed in 1994 to prove Panfilov's belief that dancers can be of any size, and not just of the slenderness favoured by professional companies. Being so large also meant that the dancers had little, if any, previous experience of public performance, a further consideration of Panfilov's.

The initial invitation to audition was aimed at teenagers weighing more than twelve stones. Demand for places has forced this hurdle up to seventeen stones. Any dancer falling below this minimum weight has to regain the loss with the help of a nutritionist or be replaced.

The troupe's act consists of parody of ballet along with modern and ethnic dances.
