= Severny-Kospashsky =

Severny-Kospashsky Северный-Коспашский
- Settlement
- Location within Perm Krai Location within Russia
- Coordinates: 59°05′N 57°48′E
- Country: Russia
- Region: Perm Krai
- District: Kizel Urban okrug
- Time zone: UTC+5:00

Severny-Kospashsky (Russian: Северный-Коспашский) is a rural locality (a settlement) in Kizel Urban okrug, Perm Krai, Russia. The population was 1,400 as of 2010. There are 40 streets.

== Geography ==
Severny-Kospashsky is located 14 km northeast of Kizel (the district's administrative centre) by road. Tsentralny Kospashsky is the nearest rural locality.
