= Shakhta =

Shakhta Шахта
- Settlement
- Location within Perm Krai Location within Russia
- Coordinates: 59°05′N 57°39′E
- Country: Russia
- Region: Perm Krai
- District: Kizel Urban okrug
- Time zone: UTC+5:00

Shakhta (Russian: Шахта) is a rural locality (a settlement) in Kizel Urban okrug, Perm Krai, Russia. The population was 1,109 as of 2010. There are 49 streets.

== Geography ==
Shakhta is located 6 km north of Kizel (the district's administrative centre) by road. Kizel is the nearest rural locality.
