= Yugo-Kamsky =

Yugo-Kamsky Юго-Камский
- Settlement
- Location within Perm Krai Location within Russia
- Coordinates: 57°55′N 56°13′E
- Country: Russia
- Region: Perm Krai
- District: Permsky District
- Time zone: UTC+5:00

Yugo-Kamsky (Russian: Юго-Камский) is a rural locality (a settlement) and the administrative center of Yugo-Kamskoye Rural Settlement, Permsky District, Perm Krai, Russia. The population was 8,019 as of 2010. There are 125 streets.

== Geography ==
Yugo-Kamsky is located 55 km southwest of Perm (the district's administrative centre) by road. Poludennaya is the nearest rural locality.
