= Novoilyinskoye, Perm Krai =

Novoilyinskoye Новоильинское
- Selo
- Location within Perm Krai Location within Russia
- Coordinates: 57°52′N 55°30′E
- Country: Russia
- Region: Perm Krai
- District: Permsky District
- Time zone: UTC+5:00

Novoilyinskoye (Russian: Новоильинское) is a rural locality (a selo) and the administrative center of Palnikovskoye Rural Settlement, Permsky District, Perm Krai, Russia. The population was 108 as of 2010. There are 10 streets.

== Geography ==
Novoilyinskoye is located 60 km southwest of Perm (the district's administrative centre) by road. Verkh-Rechka is the nearest rural locality.
