= Alexandrovsk, Perm Krai =

Town in Perm Krai, Russia

Alexandrovsk Александровск
- Town
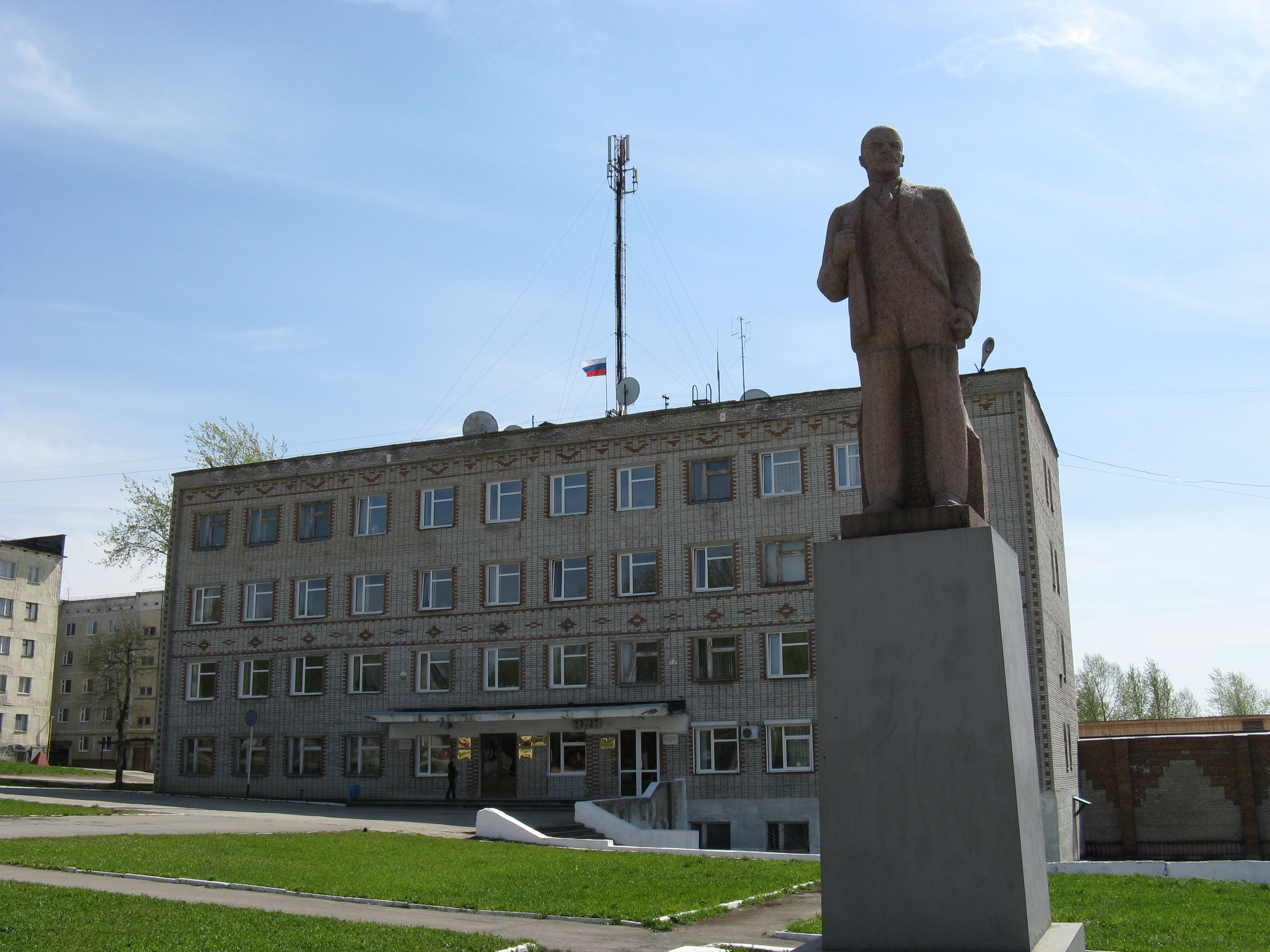
- Alexandrovsk Town Administration building

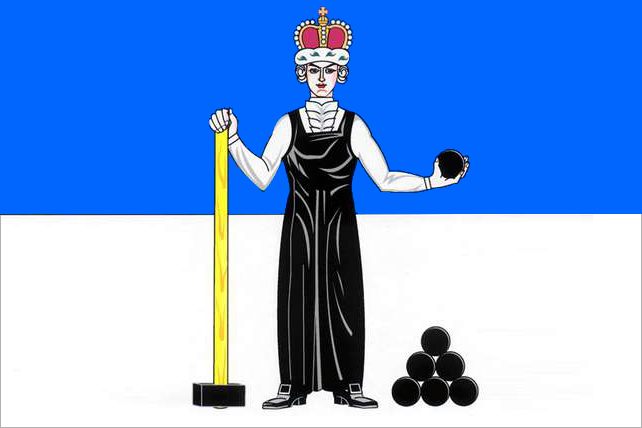
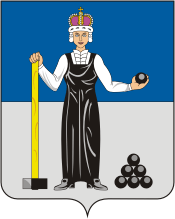
- Flag Coat of arms
- Interactive map of Alexandrovsk
- Location of Alexandrovsk Alexandrovsk (Perm Krai)
- Coordinates: 59°10′N 57°36′E
- Country: Russia
- Federal subject: Perm Krai
- Founded: 1805
- Town status since: 1951
- Elevation: 180 m (590 ft)

Population (2010 Census)
  - Total: 14,495
  - Estimate (2023): 10,502 (−27.5%)

Administrative status
  - Subordinated to: town of krai significance of Alexandrovsk
  - Capital of: town of krai significance of Alexandrovsk

Municipal status
  - Municipal district: Alexandrovsky Municipal District
  - Urban settlement: Alexandrovskoye Urban Settlement
  - Capital of: Alexandrovsky Municipal District, Alexandrovskoye Urban Settlement
- Time zone: UTC+5 (MSK+2)
- Postal codes: 618320, 618323
- OKTMO ID: 57502000001
- Website: aleksadm.ru

Alexandrovsk (Russian: Алекса́ндровск; Komi-Permyak: Лытва, Lytva; alternatively Öльöксандровскöй, Öľöksandrovsköj) is a town in Perm Krai, Russia, located on the Lytva River (Kama's tributary), 185 kilometers (115 mi) northeast of Perm, the administrative center of the krai. Population: 14,495 (2010 census); 16,231 (2002 census); 20,073 (1989 Soviet census).

== History ==
It was founded in 1805. It was granted urban-type settlement status in 1929 and town status in 1951.

== Administrative and municipal status ==
Within the framework of administrative divisions, it is, together with two work settlements (Vsevolodo-Vilva and Yayva) and thirty-five rural localities, incorporated as the town of krai significance of Alexandrovsk—an administrative unit with the status equal to that of the districts. As a municipal division, the town of Alexandrovsk, together with six rural localities, is incorporated as Alexandrovskoye Urban Settlement within Alexandrovsky Municipal District and serves as the municipal district's administrative center, while the two work settlements and twenty-nine rural localities are grouped into two urban settlements and one rural settlement within Alexandrovsky Municipal District.

== Notable residents ==
- Alexander Beloborodov (1891–1938), Bolshevik revolutionary, Soviet politician
- Konstantin Mekhonoshin (1889–1938), Bolshevik revolutionary, Soviet military figure and politician
