= Biser, Russia =

Biser Бисер
- Urban-type settlement
- Interactive map of Biser
- Location of Biser Biser (Perm Krai)
- Coordinates: 58°31′N 58°51′E
- Country: Russia
- Federal subject: Perm Krai
- Administrative district: Gornozavodsky District

Population (2010 Census)
  - Total: 1,323
  - Estimate (2023): 608 (−54%)
- Time zone: UTC+5 (MSK+2)
- Postal code: 618860
- OKTMO ID: 57614401051

Biser (Russian: Би́сер), is an urban locality (an urban-type settlement) in Gornozavodsky District, Perm Krai, Russia. Population: 1,323 (2010 census);

== History ==
The settlement was formed at Bisersky Zavod station (now Biser station) of Gornozavodskaya railway opened in 1878. The station was built 12 km to the north of Biser ironworks.

Settlement of town type since December 20, 1991. Biser was the centre of Biser town council (from 1991 until January 2006).

== Transportation ==
Biser lies on the railway from Solikamsk to Yekaterinburg. On 11 February 1924 the station was renamed Yemshanovo in honor of Alexander Ivanovich Yemshanov, the manager of the Perm Railway and a former (1920-21) People's Commissar of Communications (i.e. Transport) of the RSFSR. The name reverted to Biser after Yemshanov was shot in the Great Purge on 26 November 1937.

== Climate ==
Biser has a subarctic climate (Köppen climate classification Dfc), with very cold winters and mild summers. Precipitation is quite high, and is heavier in summer and autumn than at other times of the year.

Climate data for Biser
| Month | Jan | Feb | Mar | Apr | May | Jun | Jul | Aug | Sep | Oct | Nov | Dec | Year |
|---|---|---|---|---|---|---|---|---|---|---|---|---|---|
| Record high °C (°F) | 1.5 (34.7) | 5.6 (42.1) | 15.0 (59.0) | 24.1 (75.4) | 32.0 (89.6) | 34.5 (94.1) | 32.9 (91.2) | 33.4 (92.1) | 27.2 (81.0) | 20.2 (68.4) | 7.2 (45.0) | 2.5 (36.5) | 34.5 (94.1) |
| Mean daily maximum °C (°F) | −13.1 (8.4) | −10.8 (12.6) | −3.3 (26.1) | 5.7 (42.3) | 13.3 (55.9) | 19.3 (66.7) | 21.2 (70.2) | 18.0 (64.4) | 11.2 (52.2) | 2.1 (35.8) | −6.1 (21.0) | −11.1 (12.0) | 3.9 (39.0) |
| Daily mean °C (°F) | −16.9 (1.6) | −14.8 (5.4) | −8.3 (17.1) | 0.7 (33.3) | 7.5 (45.5) | 13.6 (56.5) | 15.9 (60.6) | 13.0 (55.4) | 7.0 (44.6) | −0.9 (30.4) | −9.1 (15.6) | −14.8 (5.4) | −0.6 (31.0) |
| Mean daily minimum °C (°F) | −20.4 (−4.7) | −18.7 (−1.7) | −12.7 (9.1) | −4.2 (24.4) | 2.0 (35.6) | 7.8 (46.0) | 10.4 (50.7) | 8.3 (46.9) | 3.4 (38.1) | −3.6 (25.5) | −11.9 (10.6) | −17.9 (−0.2) | −4.8 (23.4) |
| Record low °C (°F) | −49.8 (−57.6) | −43.3 (−45.9) | −36.9 (−34.4) | −26.0 (−14.8) | −15.9 (3.4) | −4.8 (23.4) | −0.9 (30.4) | −2.8 (27.0) | −11.2 (11.8) | −31.6 (−24.9) | −38.4 (−37.1) | −52.5 (−62.5) | −52.5 (−62.5) |
| Average precipitation mm (inches) | 53.2 (2.09) | 37.4 (1.47) | 44.0 (1.73) | 46.1 (1.81) | 64.9 (2.56) | 85.3 (3.36) | 101.2 (3.98) | 94.2 (3.71) | 88.5 (3.48) | 81.1 (3.19) | 68.3 (2.69) | 62.1 (2.44) | 826.3 (32.51) |
| Average precipitation days (≥ 0.1 mm) | 16.7 | 12.5 | 18.6 | 16.3 | 7.6 | 11.3 | 10.0 | 9.4 | 14.7 | 21.0 | 23.3 | 19.3 | 180.7 |
| Average relative humidity (%) | 80.8 | 78.1 | 74.3 | 66.5 | 55.2 | 67.4 | 68.3 | 73.8 | 81.0 | 85.0 | 85.8 | 83.3 | 75.0 |
| Mean monthly sunshine hours | 46 | 88 | 160 | 198 | 268 | 287 | 291 | 217 | 137 | 66 | 44 | 26 | 1,828 |
Source 1: climatebase.ru
Source 2: NOAA (sun only, 1961-1990)
