= Sars (urban-type settlement) =

Sars Сарс
- Urban-type settlement
- Interactive map of Sars
- Location of Sars Sars (Perm Krai)
- Coordinates: 56.5502°N 57.1284°E
- Country: Russia
- Federal subject: Perm Krai
- Administrative district: Oktyabrsky District

Population (2010 Census)
  - Total: 5,043
  - Estimate (2023): 4,541 (−10%)
- Time zone: UTC+5 (MSK+2)
- Postal code: 617870
- OKTMO ID: 57636156051

Sars (Russian: Сарс) is an urban locality (an urban-type settlement) in Oktyabrsky District of Perm Krai, Russia. Population: 5,043 (2010 census); 5,542 (2002 census); 5,817 (1989 Soviet census).

== Geography ==
Located in the upper reaches of the Sars River (Kama basin), 7 km from the Chad railway station on the Kazan-Yekaterinburg line.

The villages of Malyi Sars, Bolshoi Sars and the village of Russkii Sars are also nearby.

There are several caves and springs in the vicinity of Sars.

== History ==
The village of Sars was founded in 1859. The status of the township since 1939.
