= Pashiya =

Pashiya Пашия
- Urban-type settlement
- Interactive map of Pashiya
- Location of Pashiya Pashiya (Perm Krai)
- Coordinates: 58.4324°N 58.2555°E
- Country: Russia
- Federal subject: Perm Krai
- Administrative district: Gornozavodsky District
- Founded: 1785

Population (2010 Census)
  - Total: 5,352
  - Estimate (2023): 3,400 (−36.5%)
- Time zone: UTC+5 (MSK+2)
- Postal code: 618824
- OKTMO ID: 57714000076

Pashiya (Russian: Пашия) is an urban locality (an urban-type settlement) in Gornozavodsky District of Perm Krai, Russia. Population: 3,898 (2010 census); 4,245 (2002 census); 5,317 (1989 Soviet census).
