= Nyrob =

Urban locality in Cherdynsky District, Perm Krai, Russia

Nyrob Ныроб
- Urban-type settlement
- Interactive map of Nyrob
- Coordinates: 60°44′22″N 56°43′25″E
- Country: Russia
- Federal subject: Perm Krai
- Administrative district: Cherdynsky District

Population (2010 Census)
  - Total: 5,523
- Time zone: UTC+5 (YEKT)

Nyrob (Russian: Ныроб) is an urban locality, classified formally as a work settlement, situated within the Cherdynsky District of Perm Krai, Russia. Located in the northern reaches of the krai along the expansive geography approaching the Ural Mountains, the settlement stands as one of the oldest inhabited northern outposts in the region.

== Etymology ==
The name of the settlement derives directly from a combination of ancestral Komi-Permyak words. It is a linguistic concatenation of the terms nyr (ныр), which translates to "nose," and yb (ыб), which translates to "field." According to regional historical folklore, one of the primary foundational residents of the original camp bore the nickname or descriptor "Nose." Consequently, the combined meaning of the geographic name translates literally to "a field belonging to Nose."

== History and administration ==
The locality was first documented in surviving written administrative sources in 1579, during the period of Russian eastward frontier expansion. Because of its strategic position, Nyrob rose to temporary administrative prominence during the mid-twentieth century. It functioned twice as the designated administrative capital of the former Nyrobsky District, first from 27 February 1924 until 10 June 1931, and later during a secondary reorganization between 20 October 1931 and 4 November 1959. Recognizing its transitioning economy and population density, regional authorities formally granted Nyrob urban-type settlement status in 1963.

Demographically, the settlement has experienced a notable population decline over recent decades, dropping from a population of 5,523 residents recorded during the 2010 All-Russian Population Census to an estimated 3,220 inhabitants by 2023.

== Architecture and transportation ==
Despite its remote geographic positioning, Nyrob preserves notable examples of early imperial Russian ecclesiastical architecture. The most prominent cultural sight is the Nikolskaya Church, a stone structure that was completed in 1704. Situated immediately to the west of this complex stands the Bogoyavlenskaya Church, another significant monument erected in 1736.

Logistically, the settlement is connected to the historical town of Cherdyn, the administrative center of the district, via a 41-kilometer (25 mi) long paved highway, which serves as the primary artery for regional freight, transit, and communication.
