= Ugleuralsky =

Ugleuralsky Углеуральский
- Urban-type settlement
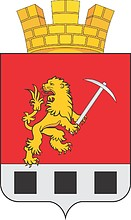
- Coat of arms
- Interactive map of Ugleuralsky
- Location of Ugleuralsky Ugleuralsky (Perm Krai)
- Coordinates: 58.9413°N 57.5886°E
- Country: Russia
- Federal subject: Perm Krai
- Founded: 1879

Population (2010 Census)
  - Total: 5,352
  - Estimate (2023): 8,481 (+58.5%)
- Time zone: UTC+5 (MSK+2)
- Postal code: 618262
- OKTMO ID: 57717000056

Ugleuralsky (Russian: Углеура́льский) is an urban locality (an urban-type settlement) in Perm Krai, Russia. Population: 5,352 (2010 census); 10,428 (2002 census); 11,108 (1989 Soviet census).
