= Chusovskoye Urban Settlement =

Municipal formation in Perm Krai, Russia

Chusovskoye Urban Settlement (Russian: Чусовское городско́е поселе́ние) is a municipal formation (an urban settlement) within Chusovskoy Municipal District of Perm Krai, Russia. It is part of Chusovoy Urban Okrug, a town of federal subject significance. It is incorporated. It is the only urban settlement in the municipal district.
