= Uralsky, Perm Krai =

Uralsky Уральский
- Work settlement
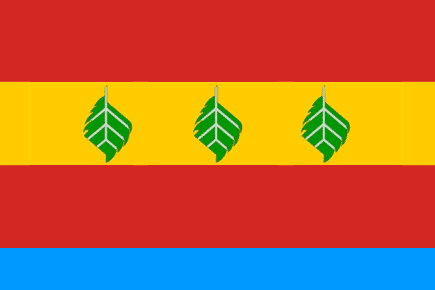
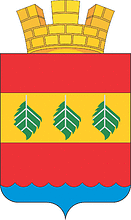
- Flag Coat of arms
- Location of Uralsky
- Location of Uralsky Uralsky (Perm Krai)
- Coordinates: 57°56′36″N 55°33′23″E
- Country: Russia
- Federal subject: Perm Krai
- Administrative district: Nytvensky District
- Founded: 1948

Population (2010 Census)
  - Total: 8,014
- Time zone: UTC+5 (MSK+2)
- Postal code(s): 617005
- OKTMO ID: 57727000061

Uralsky (Russian: Ура́льский) is an urban locality (a work settlement) in Nytvensky District of Perm Krai, Russia, located on the right bank of the Kama River. Population: 8,014 (2010 Census); 8,929 (2002 Census); 9,017 (1989 Soviet census).

== Economy ==
There is a plywood mill in Uralsky.
