= Pavlovsky, Perm Krai =

Pavlovsky Павловский
- Urban-type settlement
- Interactive map of Pavlovsky
- Location of Pavlovsky Pavlovsky (Perm Krai)
- Coordinates: 57°50′28″N 54°50′26″E
- Country: Russia
- Federal subject: Perm Krai
- Administrative district: Ochyorsky District
- Founded: 1816

Population (2010 Census)
  - Total: 3,191
  - Estimate (2023): 3,142 (−1.5%)
- Time zone: UTC+5 (MSK+2)
- Postal code: 617161
- OKTMO ID: 57644154051

Pavlovsky (Russian: Па́вловский) is an urban locality (a work settlement) in Ochyorsky District of Perm Krai, Russia. Population: 3,191 (2010 census); 3,408 (2002 census); 3,834 (1989 Soviet census).

== Name ==
The settlement is commonly called simply Pavlovsk (even on the traffic signs ).

== History ==
The factory that later became Pavlovsky Machinery Factory was founded in 1816 by Alexander Sergeyevich Stroganov. The settlement was named after his heir Pavel Alexandrovich. Since 1942, the factory's main products are turbodrills for oil extraction. The factory uses energy from a dam on Ochyor River, creating a picturesque reservoir called Pavlovsky Pond.
