= Lyamino, Perm Krai =

Lyamino Лямино
- Urban-type settlement
- Interactive map of Lyamino
- Location of Lyamino Lyamino (Perm Krai)
- Coordinates: 58.2837°N 57.7298°E
- Country: Russia
- Federal subject: Perm Krai

Population
  - Estimate (2024): 4,362 )
- Time zone: UTC+5 (MSK+2)
- Postal code: 618235
- OKTMO ID: 57658101056

Lyamino (Russian: Лямино) is an urban locality (an urban-type settlement) in Perm Krai, Russia. Its population as of 2024 is 4,362.

Previous censuses' of the settlement placed the population as: 4,475 (2021 census); 4,598 (2010 census); 5,127 (2002 census); 5,577 (1989 Soviet census).

== Shooting ==
On 11 February 1958, a school shooting occurred at School of Construction N°6 in the settlement. 24-year-old Mikhail Tselousov (Целоусов, Михаил) fatally shot seven people and wounded a further six over perceived injustice and unfair treatment at the school, which he worked at. He was arrested and executed a year later.
