= Shirokovsky =

Shirokovsky Широковский
- Urban-type settlement
- Location of Shirokovsky
- Location of Shirokovsky Shirokovsky (Perm Krai)
- Coordinates: 58.8404°N 57.7811°E
- Country: Russia
- Federal subject: Perm Krai
- Founded: 1942

Population (2010 Census)
  - Total: 3,322
- Time zone: UTC+5 (MSK+2)
- Postal code(s): 618266
- OKTMO ID: 57717000061

Shirokovsky (Russian: Широ́ковский) is an urban locality (an urban-type settlement) in Gubakha Urban Okrug, Perm Krai, Russia. Population: 3,322 (2010 Census); 1,869 (2002 Census); 1,610 (1989 Soviet census).
