= Kalino, Chusovoy, Perm Krai =

Kalino Калино
- Urban-type settlement
- Location of Kalino
- Location of Kalino Kalino (Perm Krai)
- Coordinates: 58.2509°N 57.6086°E
- Country: Russia
- Federal subject: Perm Krai
- Founded: 1878

Population (2010 Census)
  - Total: 2,136
- Time zone: UTC+5 (MSK+2)
- Postal code(s): 618245
- OKTMO ID: 57658456051

Kalino (Russian: Ка́лино) is an urban locality (an urban-type settlement) in Chusovoy Urban Okrug, Perm Krai, Russia. Population: 2,136 (2010 Census); 2,536 (2002 Census); 3,304 (1989 Soviet census).
