= Vsevolodo-Vilva =

Vsevolodo-Vilva Всеволодо-Вильва
- Urban-type settlement
- Interactive map of Vsevolodo-Vilva
- Location of Vsevolodo-Vilva Vsevolodo-Vilva (Perm Krai)
- Coordinates: 59.2167°N 57.4406°E
- Country: Russia
- Federal subject: Perm Krai
- Founded: 1811

Population (2010 Census)
  - Total: 2,827
  - Estimate (2023): 2,009 (−28.9%)
- Time zone: UTC+5 (MSK+2)
- Postal code: 618334
- OKTMO ID: 57605154051

Vsevolodo-Vilva (Russian: Все́володо-Ви́льва) is an urban locality (an urban-type settlement) in Perm Krai, Russia. Population: 2,827 (2010 census); 3,629 (2002 census); 4,448 (1989 Soviet census).
