= Overyata =

Overyata Оверята
- Urban-type settlement
- Interactive map of Overyata
- Location of Overyata Overyata (Perm Krai)
- Coordinates: 58°05′17″N 55°51′56″E
- Country: Russia
- Federal subject: Perm Krai
- Founded: 1899
- Urban-type settlement status since: 1962

Population (2010 Census)
  - Total: 4,634
  - Estimate (2023): 4,555 (−1.7%)

Municipal status
  - Municipal district: Krasnokamsky Municipal District
- Time zone: UTC+5 (MSK+2)
- Postal code: 617050
- OKTMO ID: 57627154051

Overyata (Russian: Оверята) is an urban locality (an urban-type settlement) under the administrative jurisdiction of the Town of Krasnokamsk in Perm Krai, Russia, located 26 kilometers (16 mi) west of Perm. Population: 4,634 (2010 census); 4,622 (2002 census); 4,955 (1989 Soviet census).

== History ==
It was founded as a railway platform. In 1953, a reinforced concrete structures factory (known as JSC "Permtranszhelezobeton" since 1993) was built. Also in 1953, a brickyard was built. Urban-type settlement status was granted to Overyata in 1962.
