= Kusye-Alexandrovsky =

Kusye-Alexandrovsky Кусье-Александровский
- Urban-type settlement
- Interactive map of Kusye-Alexandrovsky
- Location of Kusye-Alexandrovsky Kusye-Alexandrovsky (Perm Krai)
- Coordinates: 58.2838°N 58.3745°E
- Country: Russia
- Federal subject: Perm Krai
- Administrative district: Gornozavodsky District

Population (2010 Census)
  - Total: 1,788
  - Estimate (2023): 1,510 (−15.5%)
- Time zone: UTC+5 (MSK+2)
- Postal code: 618831
- OKTMO ID: 57614402051

Kusye-Alexandrovsky (Russian: Ку́сье-Алекса́ндровский) is an urban locality (an urban-type settlement) in Gornozavodsky District of Perm Krai, Russia. Population: 1,788 (2010 census); 1,943 (2002 census); 2,656 (1989 Soviet census).
