= Yayva =

Yayva Яйва
- Urban-type settlement
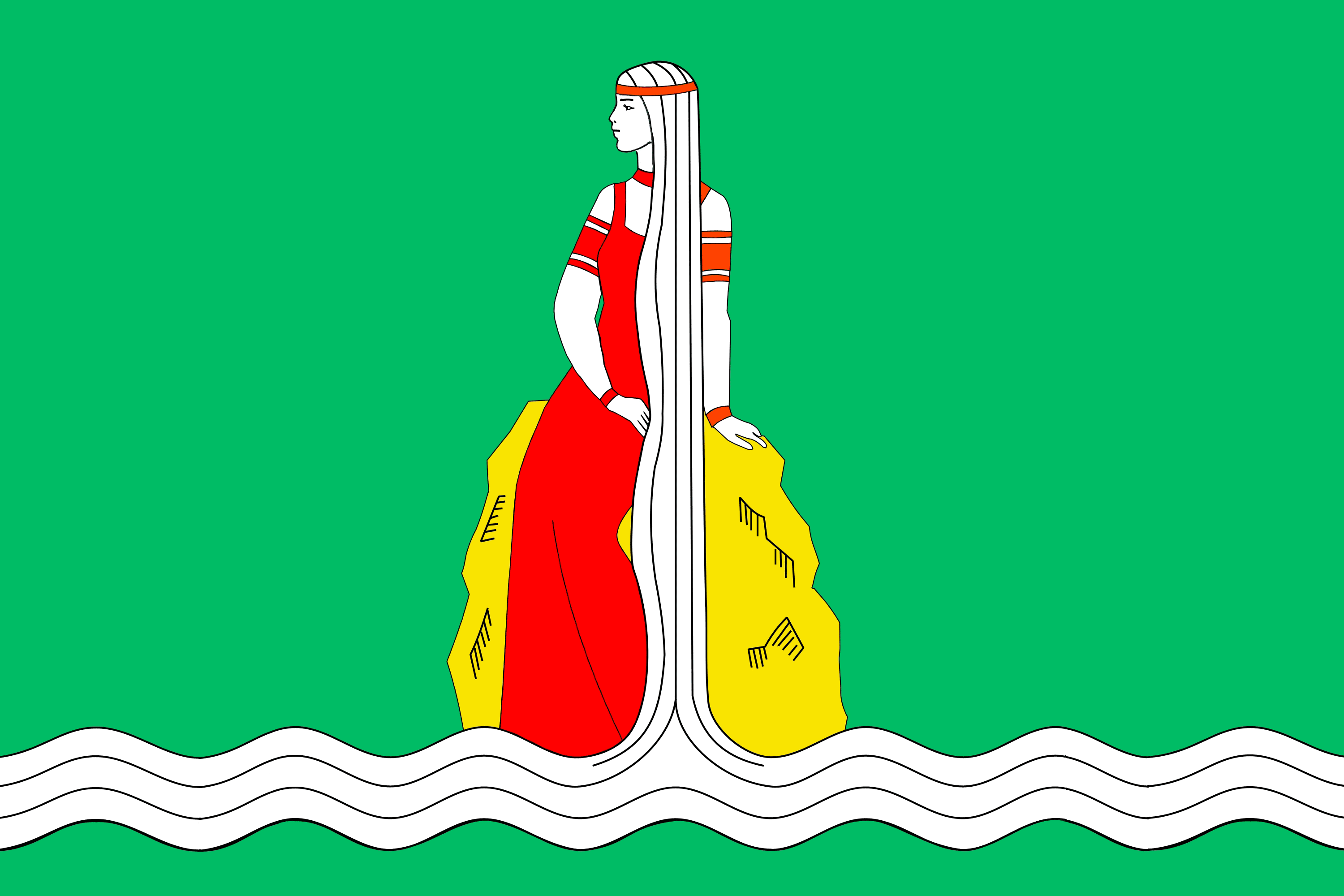
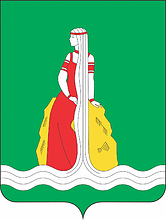
- Flag Coat of arms
- Interactive map of Yayva
- Location of Yayva Yayva (Perm Krai)
- Coordinates: 59.3321°N 57.2717°E
- Country: Russia
- Federal subject: Perm Krai
- Founded: 1930

Population (2010 Census)
  - Total: 10,325
  - Estimate (2023): 8,260 (−20%)
- Time zone: UTC+5 (MSK+2)
- Postal code: 618340
- OKTMO ID: 57605158051

Yayva (Russian: Я́йва) is an urban locality (an urban-type settlement) in Perm Krai, Russia. Population: 10,325 (2010 census); 10,885 (2002 census); 11,877 (1989 Soviet census).
