= Koyva =

River in Perm Krai, Russia

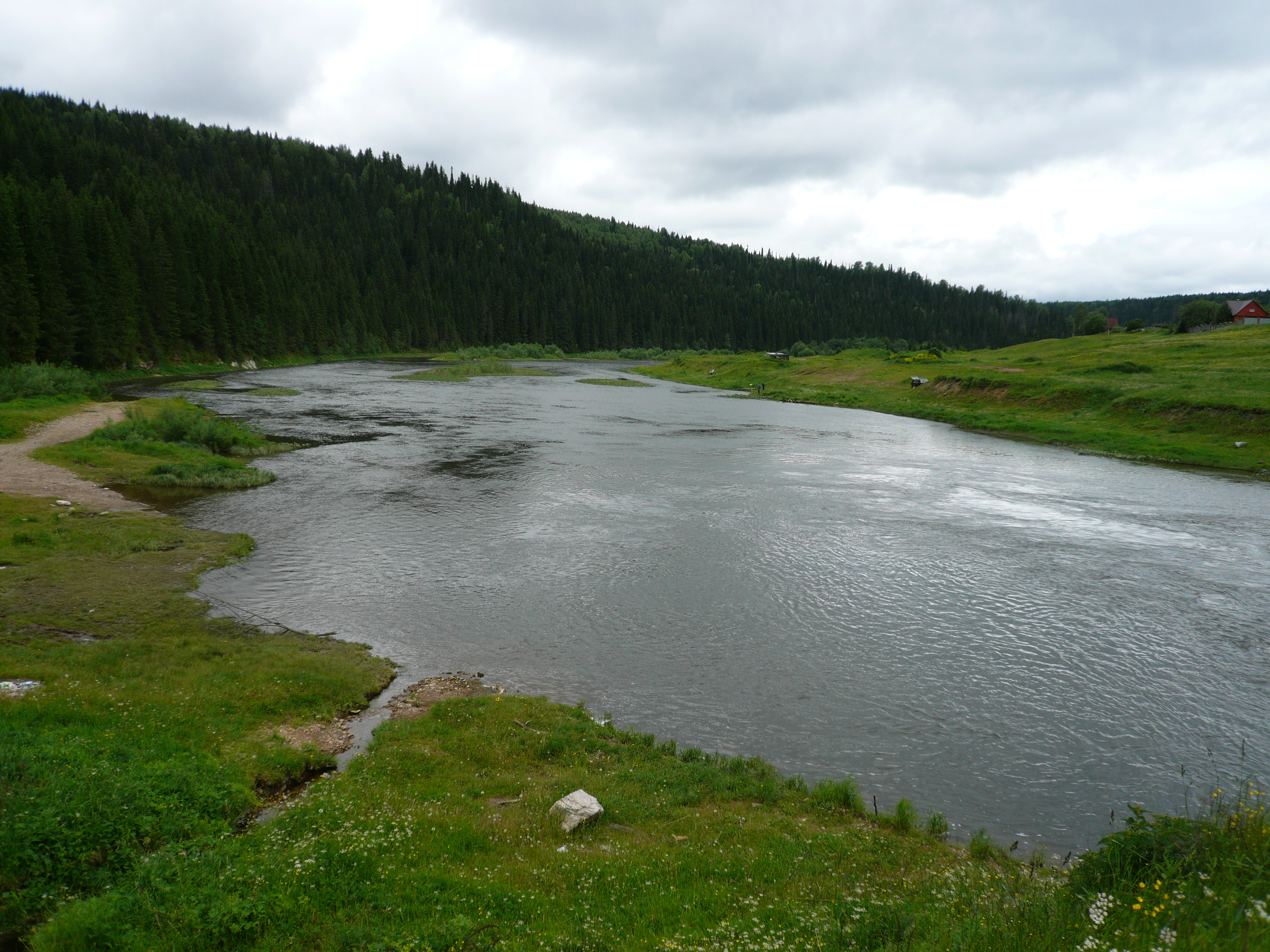

Physical characteristics
- Source
  - location: Ural Mountains
- Mouth: Chusovaya
  - coordinates: 58.2331°N 58.2039°E
- Length: 180 km (110 mi)
- Basin size: 2,250 km^{2} (870 sq mi)

Basin features
- Progression: Chusovaya→ Kama→ Volga→ Caspian Sea

The Koyva (Russian: Койва) is a river in Perm Krai in Russia, a right tributary of the Chusovaya (Kama's basin). The river is 180 kilometres (110 mi) long, and its drainage basin covers 2,250 square kilometres (870 sq mi). It starts on the western slope of the Ural Mountains, on the slopes of Mount Bolshaya Khmelikha. Its mouth is near the settlement Ust-Koyva, 66 kilometres (41 mi) from the mouth of the Chusovaya River. It is a mountain river with many rapids and shoals.

It was along the Koyva that the first ever diamonds were found in 1829 in Russia. There are urban-type settlement Tyoplaya Gora situated by the river.

Main tributaries:

- Left: Tiskos, Tyrym, Olkhovka;
- Right: Biser, Kusya.

== Etymology ==
Name of river is a composition of Komi-Permyak words ‘koy’ (splash) and ‘va’ (water).
