= Gremyachinsk =

Town in Perm Krai, Russia

Gremyachinsk Гремячинск
- Town
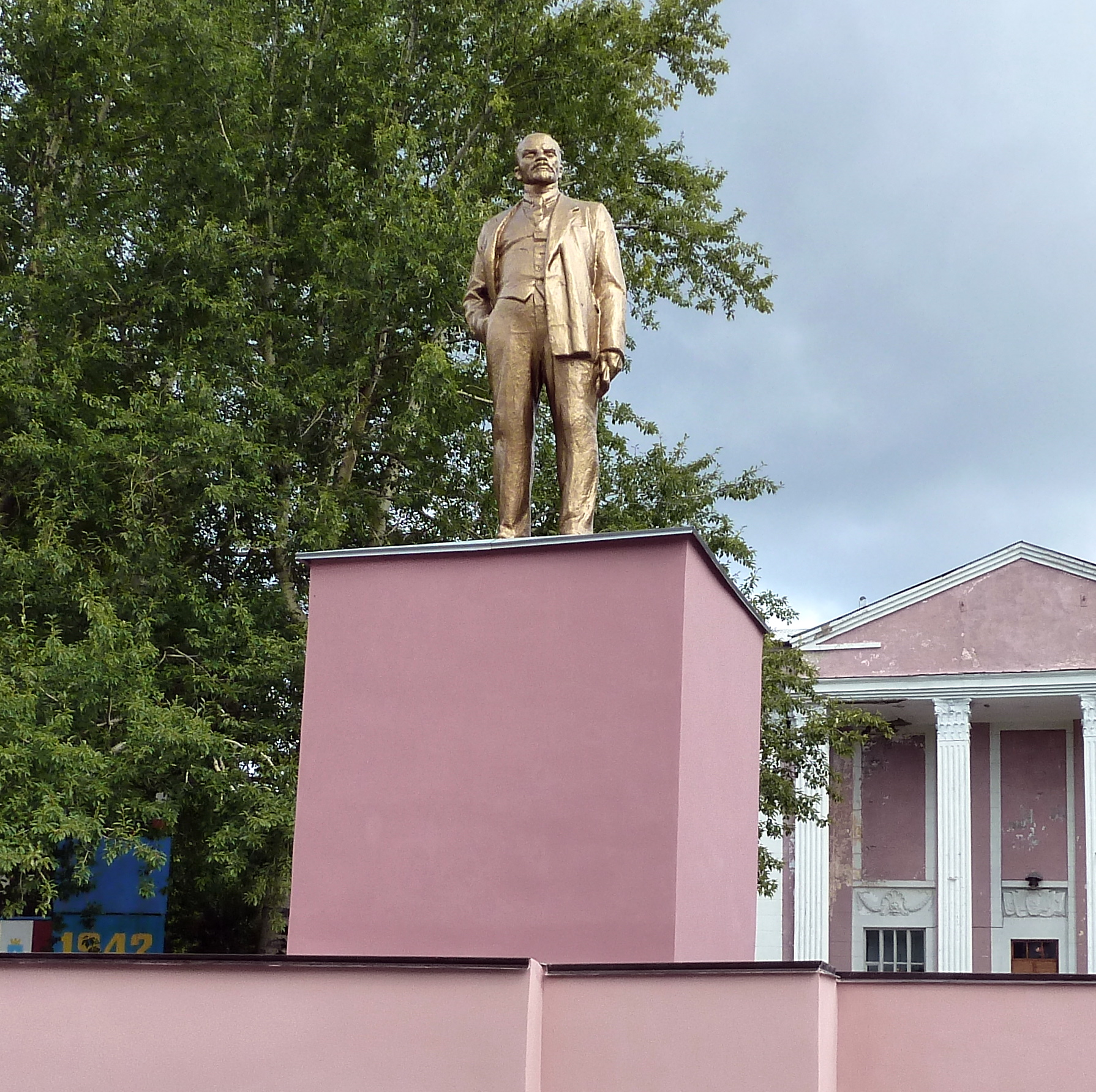
- The statue of Vladimir Lenin in Gremyachinsk

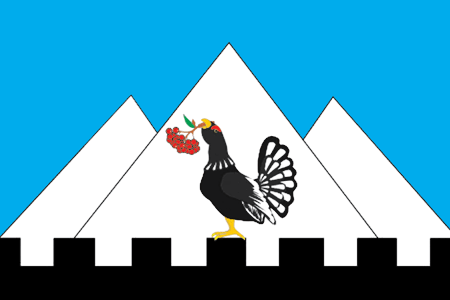
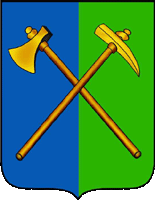
- Flag Coat of arms
- Interactive map of Gremyachinsk
- Location of Gremyachinsk Gremyachinsk (Perm Krai)
- Coordinates: 58°34′N 57°51′E
- Country: Russia
- Federal subject: Perm Krai
- Founded: 1942
- Town status since: 1949
- Elevation: 340 m (1,120 ft)

Population (2010 Census)
  - Total: 10,752
  - Estimate (2023): 8,100 (−24.7%)

Administrative status
  - Subordinated to: town of krai significance of Gremyachinsk
  - Capital of: town of krai significance of Gremyachinsk

Municipal status
  - Municipal district: Gremyachinsky Municipal District
  - Urban settlement: Gremyachinskoye Urban Settlement
  - Capital of: Gremyachinsky Municipal District, Gremyachinskoye Urban Settlement
- Time zone: UTC+5 (MSK+2)
- Postal codes: 618270, 618273, 618275–618277
- OKTMO ID: 57516000006

Gremyachinsk (Russian: Гремя́чинск) is a town in Perm Krai, Russia, located 174 kilometers (108 mi) northeast of Perm, the administrative center of the krai. Population: 10,752 (2010 census); 13,237 (2002 census); 20,977 (1989 Soviet census).

== History ==
The emergence of the town in 1841 is connected with the mastering of the Gremyachinsky coal deposit. In 1942 when coal mining started the mining settlements on the territory of the deposit and station settlement Baskaya were united to form the settlement of urban-type Gremyachinsky and in 1949 the settlement was transformed to town. In those years a significant part of the town and its surroundings was made up of the recently released GULAG prisoners and "special settlers" (mostly German prisoners of war).

The further life of the town was connected with coal mining, Gremyachinsk shared the fate of other towns of decaying Kizelovsky coalfield. During the war years, the acute need for coal and the use of cheap labour made the development of the Gremyachinsky deposit profitable. Since the 1960s, coal production in the Kizelovsky basin became unprofitable and started to decrease. In the 1970s, the automobile parts plant and several other enterprises were built to keep the town busy which slowed the flow of population out of the town. With the closure of the last mines in the 1990s, Gremyachinsk became a village near a gas compressor station.

== Administrative and municipal status ==
Within the framework of administrative divisions, it is, together with the work settlement of Usva and five rural localities, incorporated as the town of krai significance of Gremyachinsk—an administrative unit with the status equal to that of the districts. As a municipal division, the town of Gremyachinsk, together with two rural localities, is incorporated as Gremyachinskoye Urban Settlement within Gremyachinsky Municipal District and serves as the municipal district's administrative center, while the work settlement of Usva and the remaining three rural localities are grouped into three rural settlements within Gremyachinsky Municipal District.

== See also ==
- Zagotovka
