= Krasnokamsk =

Town in Perm Krai, Russia

Krasnokamsk Краснокамск
- Town
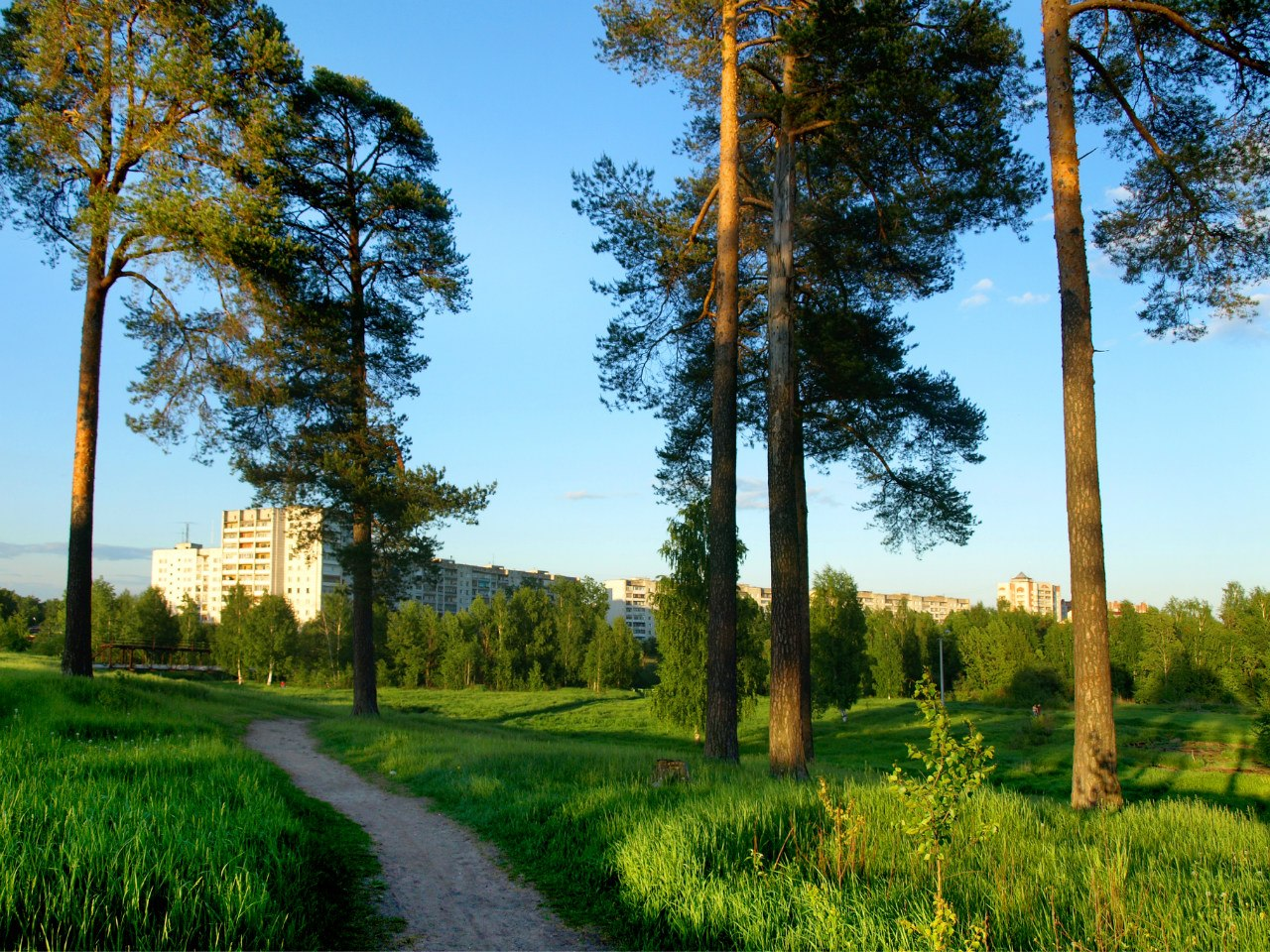

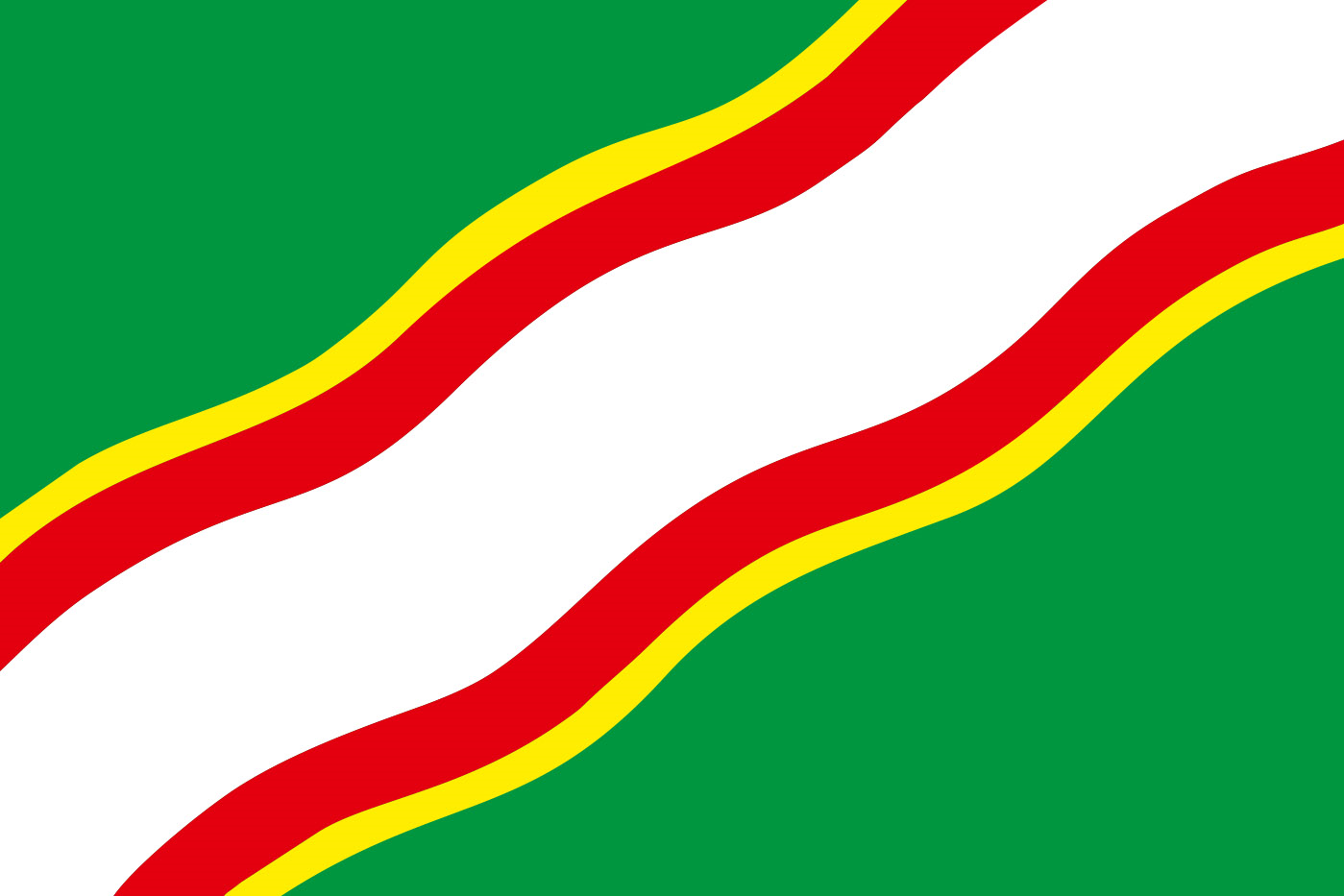
- Flag Coat of arms
- Interactive map of Krasnokamsk
- Location of Krasnokamsk Krasnokamsk (Perm Krai)
- Coordinates: 58°05′N 55°41′E
- Country: Russia
- Federal subject: Perm Krai
- Founded: 1930
- Town status since: 1938

Government
  - Head: Yury Chechyotkin
- Elevation: 100 m (330 ft)

Population (2010 Census)
  - Total: 51,916
  - Estimate (2025): 47,051 (−9.4%)
  - Rank: 313th in 2010

Administrative status
  - Subordinated to: town of krai significance of Krasnokamsk
  - Capital of: town of krai significance of Krasnokamsk

Municipal status
  - Municipal district: Krasnokamsky Municipal District
  - Urban settlement: Krasnokamskoye Urban Settlement
  - Capital of: Krasnokamsky Municipal District, Krasnokamskoye Urban Settlement
- Time zone: UTC+5 (MSK+2)
- Postal codes: 617060, 617062, 617064–617067, 617079
- Dialing code: +7 34273
- OKTMO ID: 57627101001
- Website: krasnokamsk.ru

Krasnokamsk (Russian: Краснокамск) is a town in Perm Krai, Russia, located on the north bank of the Kama River, 35 kilometers (22 mi) west of Perm, the administrative center of the krai. Population: 51,916 (2010 census); 53,724 (2002 census); 57,681 (1989 Soviet census).

== History ==
Foundation of the town is associated with the construction of the Kama paper mill. 1930 is considered to be the date of the foundation. The settlement was originally called Bumstroy (Бумстрой), but in 1933 it was renamed Krasnokamsk and was granted urban-type settlement status. In 1938, it was granted town status.

The construction of the paper mill lead to the emergence of the Zakamsk CHP and Goznak paper and printing factory. In 1942, on the basis of evacuees from Moscow Oblast enterprise was created metal grid factory.

In 1934, oil was found on the factory's territory and in 1936 the extraction of petroleum began. In 1943, an oil refinery was built. Light and food industry factories were built later.

== Administrative and municipal status ==
Within the framework of administrative divisions, it is, together with the work settlement of Overyata and seventy-two rural localities, incorporated as the town of krai significance of Krasnokamsk—an administrative unit with the status equal to that of the districts. As a municipal division, the town of Krasnokamsk is incorporated as Krasnokamskoye Urban Settlement within Krasnokamsky Municipal District and serves as the municipal district's administrative center. The work settlement of Overyata and the seventy-two rural localities are grouped into one urban settlement and one rural settlement within Krasnokamsky Municipal District.

== Transportation ==
Krasnokamsk has advantageous transport position. A 9-kilometer (5.6 mi) branch line connects it with the main Perm–Moscow railway. An important highway runs through Krasnokamsk and connects Perm, Ochyor, and Igra (in the Udmurt Republic). The town is connected by bus with other destinations. During Soviet times, river transport also functioned, allowing to reach the left bank of the Kama faster.
