= Novoilyinsky, Perm Krai =

Novoilyinsky Новоильинский
- Urban-type settlement
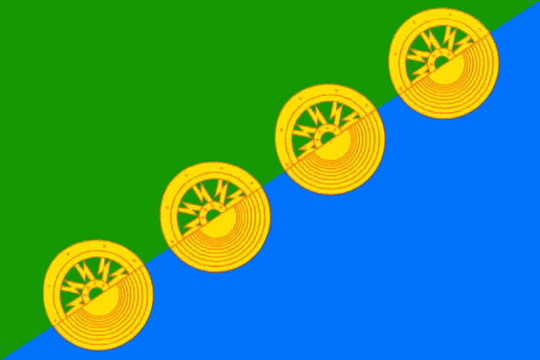
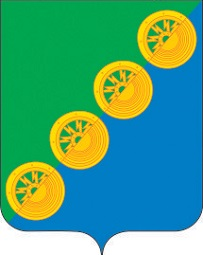
- Flag Coat of arms
- Interactive map of Novoilyinsky
- Location of Novoilyinsky Novoilyinsky (Perm Krai)
- Coordinates: 57.8967°N 55.4778°E
- Country: Russia
- Federal subject: Perm Krai
- Administrative district: Nytvensky District

Population (2010 Census)
  - Total: 3,638
  - Estimate (2023): 2,927 (−19.5%)
- Time zone: UTC+5 (MSK+2)
- Postal code: 617016
- OKTMO ID: 57634153051

Novoilyinsky (Russian: Новоильи́нский) is an urban locality (an urban-type settlement) in Nytvensky District of Perm Krai, Russia. Population: 3,638 (2010 census); 3,753 (2002 census); 4,944 (1989 Soviet census).
