= Polazna =

Polazna Полазна
- Urban-type settlement
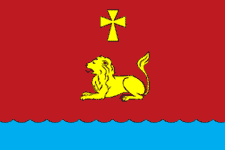
- Flag Coat of arms
- Interactive map of Polazna
- Location of Polazna Polazna (Perm Krai)
- Coordinates: 58°17′17″N 56°24′24″E
- Country: Russia
- Federal subject: Perm Krai

Population (2010 Census)
  - Total: 12,753
  - Estimate (2023): 11,332 (−11.1%)
- Time zone: UTC+5 (MSK+2)
- Postal code: 618703
- OKTMO ID: 57616157051

Polazna (Russian: Пола́зна) is an urban locality (an urban-type settlement) under the administrative jurisdiction of the Town of Dobryanka in Perm Krai, Russia, located on the east bank of Kama Reservoir, 45 kilometers (28 mi) north of Perm and 25 kilometers (16 mi) south of Dobryanka. Population: 12,753 (2010 census); 13,303 (2002 census); 12,113 (1989 Soviet census).

== History ==
Polazna was first mentioned in the Census of Great Perm in 1623–1624 as a settlement at the confluence of the Polazna River with four households and fourteen inhabitants. In 1797, an ironwork factory was built there, and Polazna became a factory settlement. In 1927, the factory was closed and its territory was flooded due to the construction of Kama Reservoir. In 1949, commercial development of oil started in Polazna. In 1956, Polazna was granted urban-type settlement status. In 1996, a bridge over the Kama River, which connected Polazna with Perm, was built.
