= Usva =

Usva Усьва
- Urban-type settlement
- Location of Usva
- Location of Usva Usva (Perm Krai)
- Coordinates: 58.6834°N 57.6377°E
- Country: Russia
- Federal subject: Perm Krai

Population (2010 Census)
  - Total: 535
- Time zone: UTC+5 (MSK+2)
- Postal code(s): 618282
- OKTMO ID: 57615454051

Usva (Russian: У́сьва) is an urban locality (an urban-type settlement) in Gubakha Urban Okrug, Perm Krai, Russia. Population: 535 (2010 Census); 758 (2002 Census); 1,353 (1989 Soviet census).
