= Skalny, Perm Krai =

Skalny Скальный
- Urban-type settlement
- Location of Skalny
- Location of Skalny Skalny (Perm Krai)
- Coordinates: 58.3654°N 57.9661°E
- Country: Russia
- Federal subject: Perm Krai

Population (2010 Census)
  - Total: 1,853
- Time zone: UTC+5 (MSK+2)
- Postal code(s): 618230
- OKTMO ID: 57658462051

Skalny (Russian: Ска́льный) is an urban locality (an urban-type settlement) in Chusovoy Urban Okrug, Perm Krai, Russia. Population: 1,853 (2010 Census); 2,122 (2002 Census); 5,951 (1989 Soviet census).
