= Gornozavodsk, Perm Krai =

Town in Perm Krai, Russia

Gornozavodsk Горнозаводск
- Town
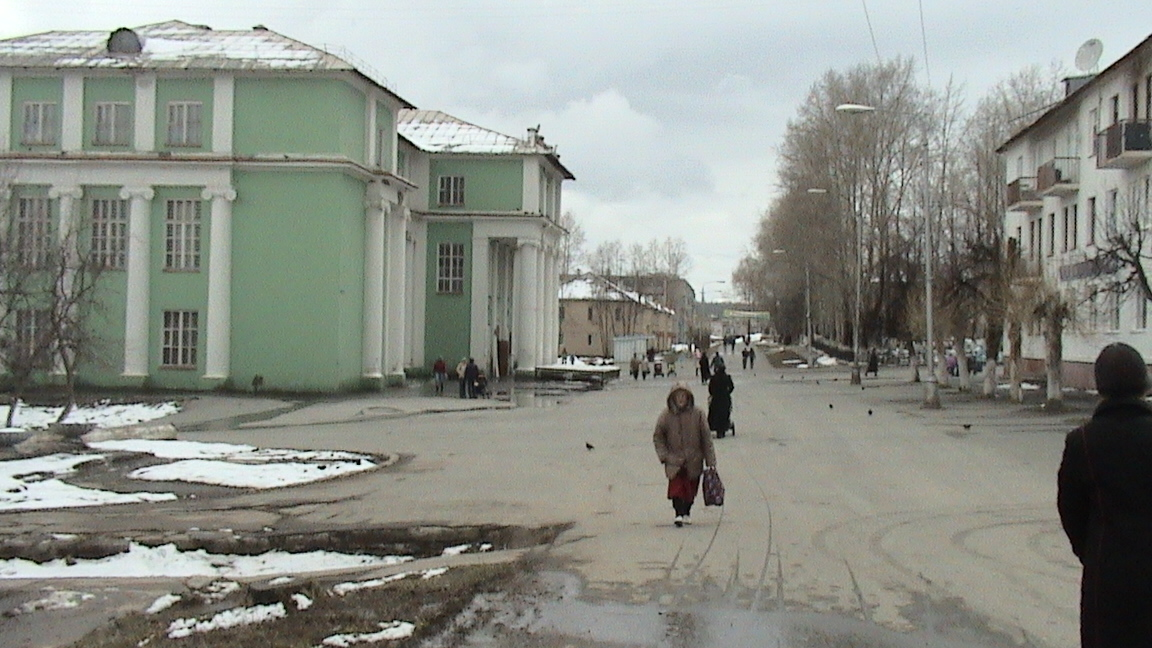
- House of Culture in Gornozavodsk

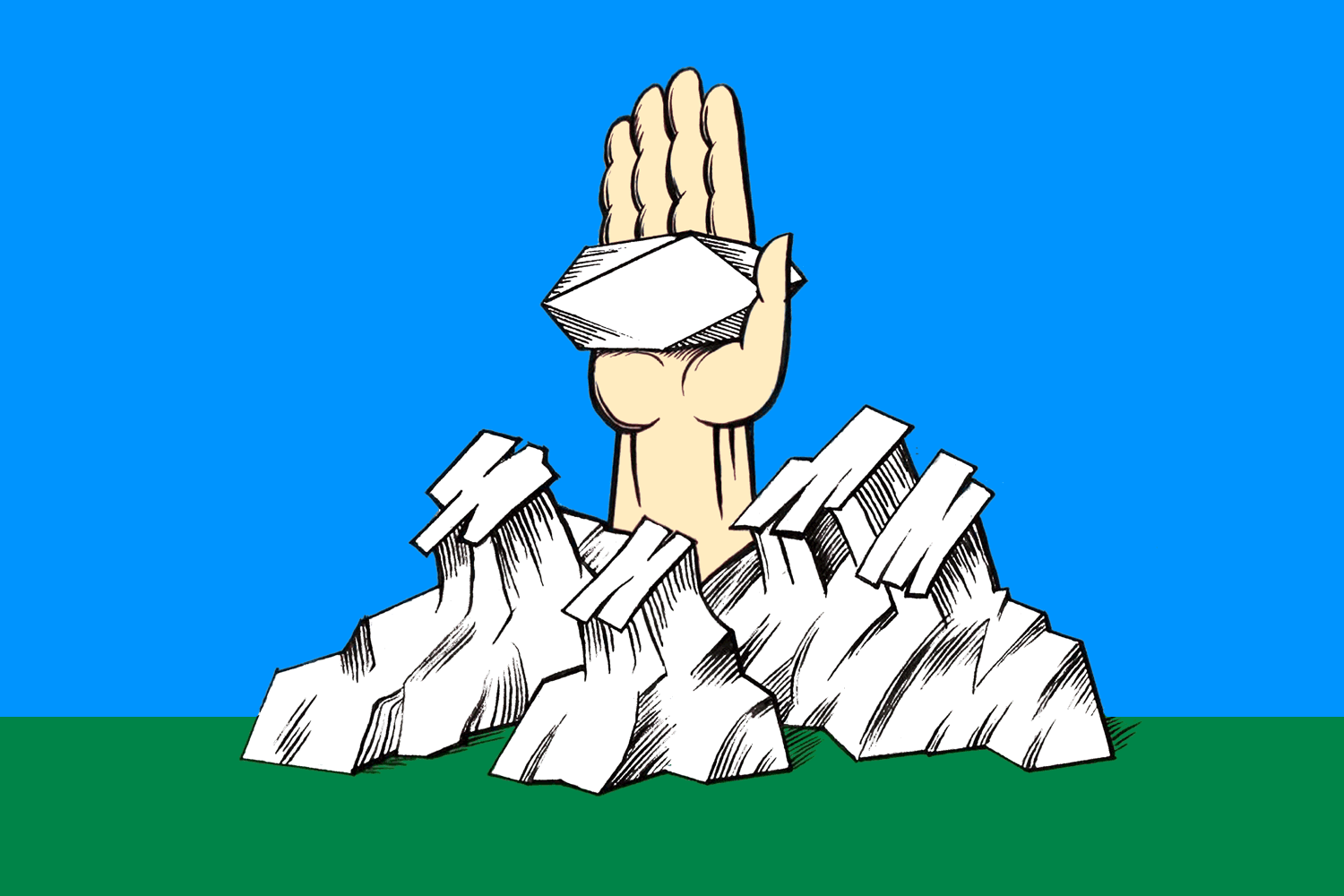
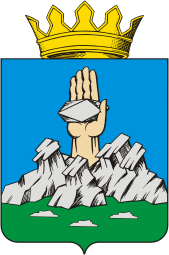
- Flag Coat of arms
- Interactive map of Gornozavodsk
- Location of Gornozavodsk Gornozavodsk (Perm Krai)
- Coordinates: 58°22′N 58°20′E
- Country: Russia
- Federal subject: Perm Krai
- Administrative district: Gornozavodsky District
- Founded: 1947
- Town status since: 1965
- Elevation: 280 m (920 ft)

Population (2010 Census)
  - Total: 12,057
  - Estimate (2023): 10,890 (−9.7%)

Administrative status
  - Capital of: Gornozavodsky District

Municipal status
  - Municipal district: Gornozavodsky Municipal District
  - Urban settlement: Gornozavodskoye Urban Settlement
  - Capital of: Gornozavodsky Municipal District, Gornozavodskoye Urban Settlement
- Time zone: UTC+5 (MSK+2)
- Postal code: 618820
- Dialing code: +7 34269
- OKTMO ID: 57614101001

Gornozavodsk (Russian: Горнозаво́дск; Komi Permyak: Вильпашия, Viľpašija) is a town and the administrative center of Gornozavodsky District in Perm Krai, Russia, located 192 kilometers (119 mi) northeast of Perm, the administrative center of the krai. Population: 12,057 (2010 census); 13,061 (2002 census); 14,858 (1989 Soviet census). It was previously known as Novopashiysky (until 1965).

== History ==
Until the mid-1940s, there was a small railway station on the site of today's town, and the station buildings were closely adjoined by a forest. In 1947, construction of a cement plant began, the first phase of which has been in operation since 1955. As the plant developed, the settlement, which was called Novo-Pashisky, grew too. In 1950 it was given an urban-type settlement status.

On the 4th of November 1965 under the decree of the Presidium of the Supreme Soviet of RSFSR Novopashiskiy settlement had been transformed to a town of regional subordination and was renamed as Gornozavodsk. The same decree established the Gornozavodsky District with its centre in the town of Gornozavodsk.

== Administrative and municipal status ==
Within the framework of administrative divisions, Gornozavodsk serves as the administrative center of Gornozavodsky District, to which it is directly subordinated. As a municipal division, the town of Gornozavodsk, together with two rural localities, is incorporated within Gornozavodsky Municipal District as Gornozavodskoye Urban Settlement.
