= Gornozavodsky District =

Gornozavodsky District Горнозаводский район (Russian)
- District
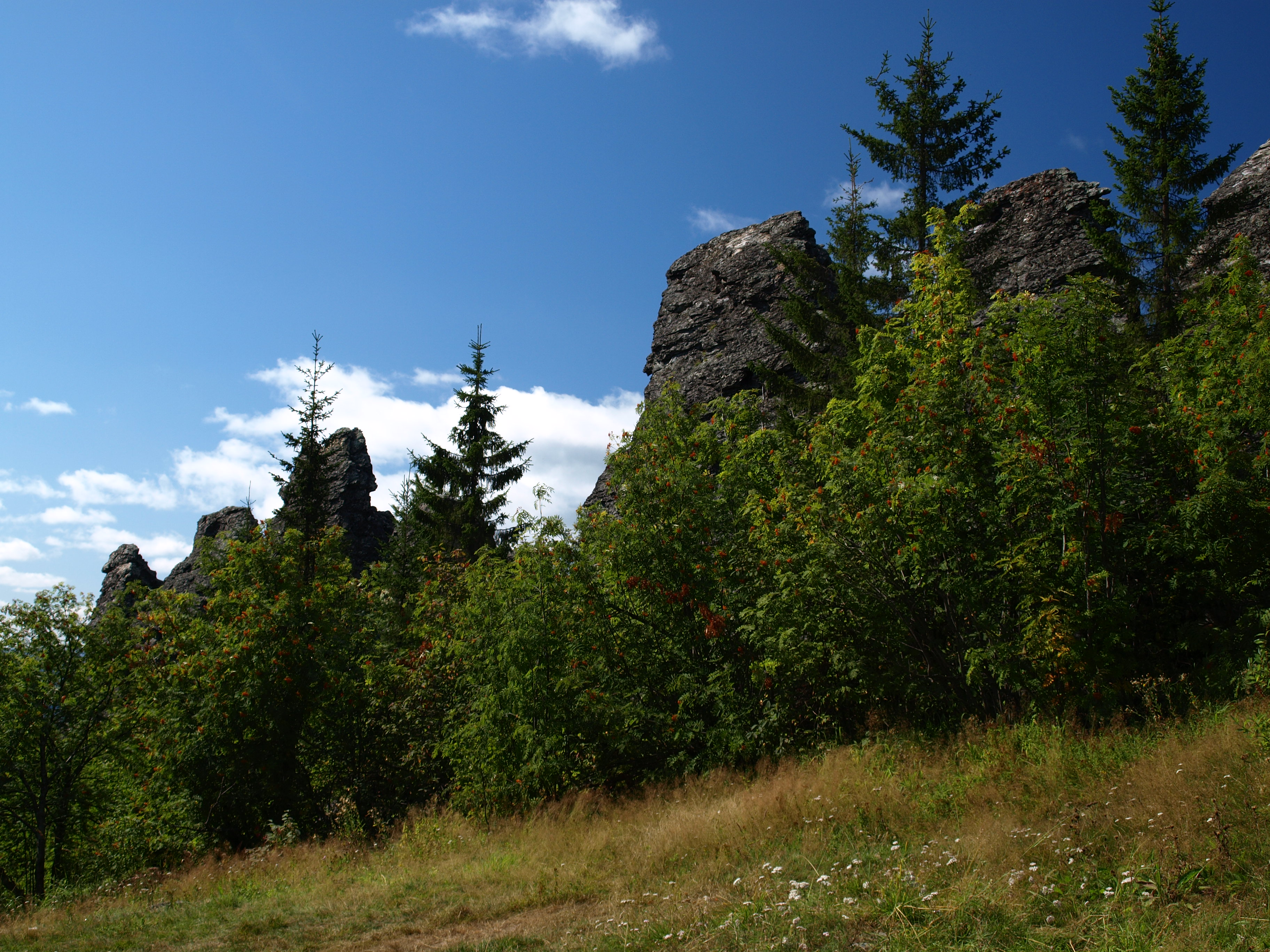
- Rock formations, Kolpaki, Gornozavodsky District

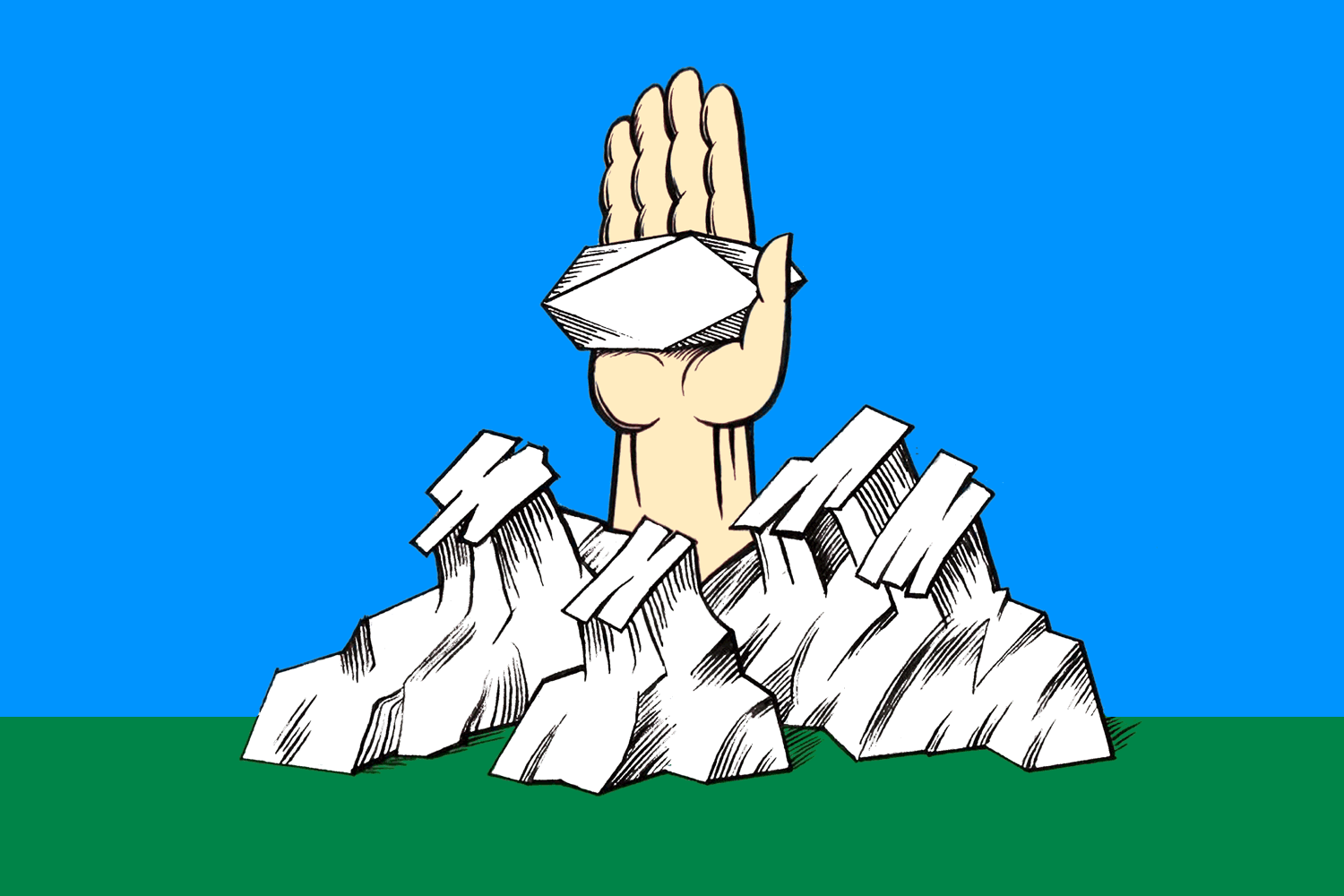
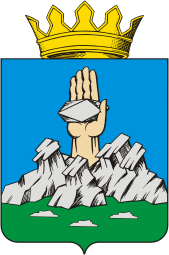
- Flag Coat of arms
- Location of Gornozavodsky District in Perm Krai
- Coordinates: 58.584°N 57.545°E
- Country: Russia
- Federal subject: Perm Krai
- Established: November 4, 1965
- Administrative center: Gornozavodsk

Area
  - Total: 7,057 km^{2} (2,725 sq mi)

Population (2010 Census)
  - Total: 26,044
  - Density: 3.691/km^{2} (9.558/sq mi)
  - Urban: 94.4%
  - Rural: 5.6%

Administrative structure
  - Inhabited localities: 1 cities/towns, 1 urban-type settlements, 9 rural localities

Municipal structure
  - Municipally incorporated as: Gornozavodsky Municipal District
  - Municipal divisions: 1 urban settlements, 6 rural settlements
- Time zone: UTC+5 (MSK+2)
- OKTMO ID: 57614000
- Website: http://www.gornozavodskii.ru/

Gornozavodsky District (Russian: Горнозаво́дский райо́н) is an administrative district (raion) of Perm Krai, Russia; one of the thirty-three in the krai. Municipally, it is incorporated as Gornozavodsky Municipal District. It is located on the western slopes of the Ural Mountains in the east of the krai. The area of the district is 7,057 square kilometers (2,725 sq mi). Its administrative center is the town of Gornozavodsk. Population: 26,044 (2010 census); 30,172 (2002 census); 38,004 (1989 Soviet census). The population of Gornozavodsk accounts for 46.3% of the district's total population.

== Geography ==
The landscape of the district is hilly in the west and mountainous in the east. Climate changes from southwest to northeast, where it becomes more cold and humid. Main rivers include the Vilva, the Vizhay, the Koyva, and the Usva.

A part of the Basegi Nature Reserve occupies the north of the district.

== History ==
Human settlement of this territory started in the early 17th century, when iron ore was found. Several metallurgical plants were later constructed. In the end of the 19th century, the Perm–Yekaterinburg was constructed, contributing to the development of the region. The district in its modern borders was established on November 4, 1965, when it was split from Chusovskoy District.

== Demographics ==
Most of the inhabited localities in the district are concentrated along the Perm-Nizhny Tagil railroad and along the Koyva River.

Ethnically, Russians account for 88.4% of the population, Tatars are distant second at 4.9%, followed by Ukrainians at 1.7%.

== Economy ==
Timber and metallurgical industries and manufacture of building materials form the basis of the district's economy.

== Sources ==
- Законодательное собрание Пермской области. Закон №416-67 от 28 февраля 1996 г. «Об административно-территориальном устройстве Пермского края», в ред. Закона №504-ПК от 9 июля 2015 г. «О внесении изменений в Закон Пермской области "Об административно-территориальном устройстве Пермского края"». Вступил в силу с момента опубликования. Опубликован: "Звезда", №38, 12 марта 1996 г. (Legislative Assembly of Perm Oblast. Law #416-67 of February 28, 1996 On the Administrative-Territorial Structure of Perm Krai, as amended by the Law #504-PK of July 9, 2015 On Amending the Law of Perm Oblast "On the Administrative-Territorial Structure of Perm Krai". Effective as of the moment of publication.).
- Законодательное собрание Пермской области. Закон №1733-354 от 10 ноября 2004 г. «Об утверждении границ и о наделении статусом муниципальных образований Горнозаводского района Пермского края», в ред. Закона №273-ПК от 14 декабря 2013 г. «О внесении изменений в отдельные Законы Пермской области, Коми-Пермяцкого автономного округа, Пермского края». Вступил в силу через десять дней со дня официального опубликования. Опубликован: "Бюллетень Законодательного Собрания и администрации Пермской области", №12, I часть, 9 декабря 2004 г. (Legislative Assembly of Perm Oblast. Law #1733-354 of November 10, 2004 On Establishing the Borders and on Granting the Status to the Municipal Formations of Gornozavodsky District of Perm Krai, as amended by the Law #273-PK of December 14, 2013 On Amending Various Laws of Perm Oblast, Komi-Permyak Autonomous Okrug, Perm Krai. Effective as of the day which is ten days following the day of the official publication.).
