= Upper Kama Upland =

Elevation in the headwaters of Kama and Cheptsa rivers in Russia

- Верхнекамская возвышенность
- Location within Russia

Highest point
- Coordinates: 58°30′N 54°0′E

Upper Kama Upland (Russian: Верхнекамская возвышенность) is an elevation in the headwaters of Kama and Cheptsa rivers, located on the area of Udmurt Republic, Perm Krai and Kirov Oblast, Russia.

On the east slopes start such right tributaries of Kama River as Kosa, Inva and Obva; on the other side of the watershed is the source of Kama. The height of the relief in the most elevated part of the upland reaches 300–335 m (highest point in mount Krasnoyar (Kirov Oblast'), 337 m). Average elevations are 240–280 m. The upland has a boreal climate (Köppen: Dfc, bordering on Dfb). The average temperature for January is about -15-16°C, for July is about +16+17°C, and the annual temperature is about 0+1°C. The annual precipitation is 550–650 mm. There are oil reserves in the depths of upland: the largest fields are Krasnokamsk and Mishkinskoye. Considerable reserves of peat.

Most of the upland is covered by coniferous forests.

The most important settlements are Afanasyevo, Karsovaj, Kuliga, Omutninsk, Severny Kommunar, Siva.

== See also ==
- Highest points of Russian Federal subjects
