= Ilyinsky District, Perm Krai =

Ilyinsky District Ильинский район (Russian)
- District
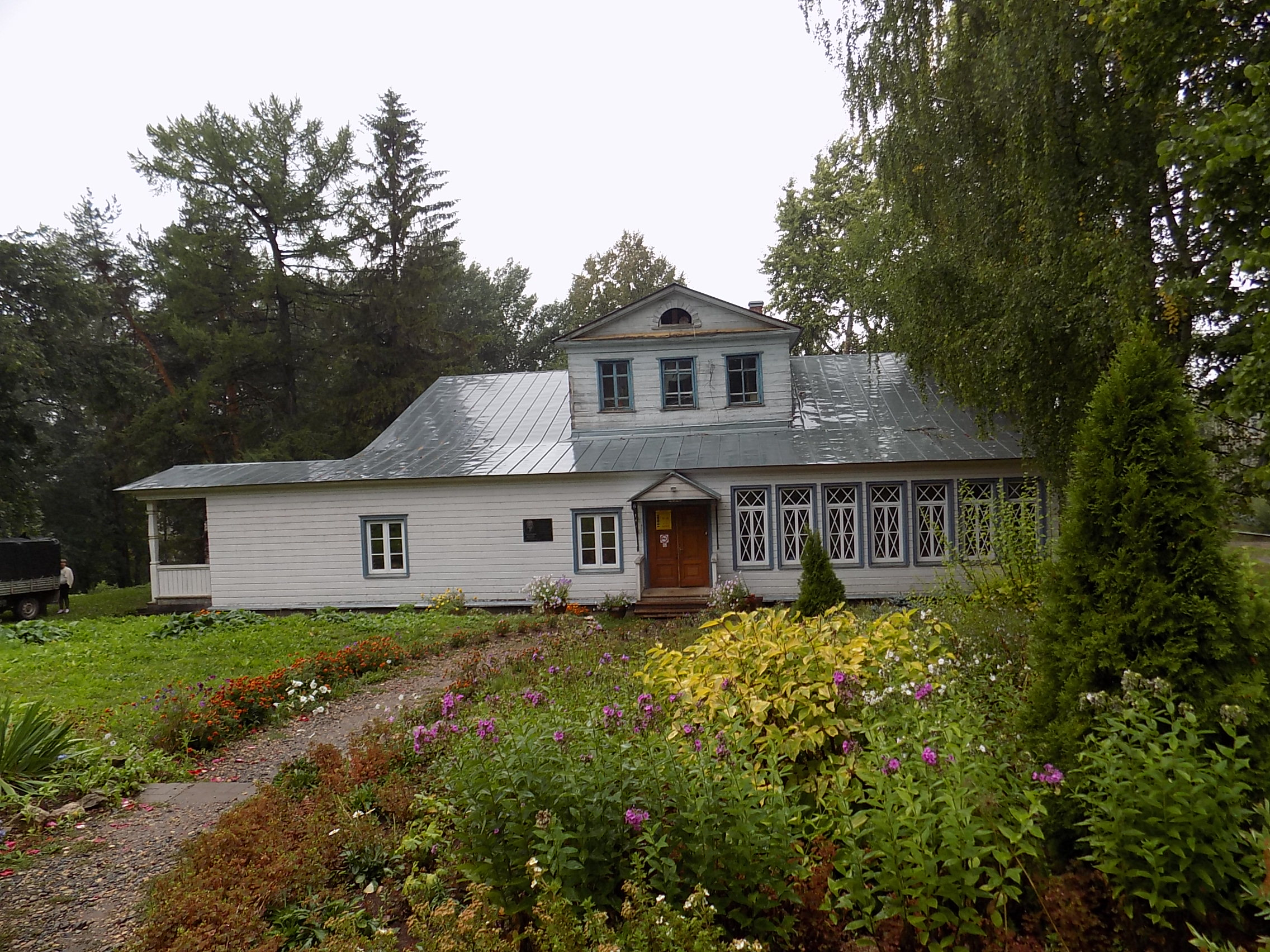
- Historic home in Ilyinsky, Ilyinsky District

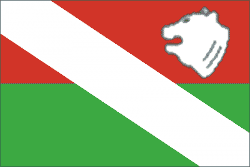
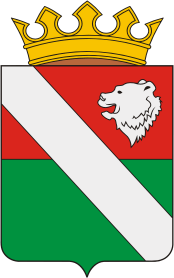
- Flag Coat of arms
- Location of Ilyinsky District in Perm Krai
- Coordinates: 58°34′10″N 55°41′39″E
- Country: Russia
- Federal subject: Perm Krai
- Established: December 1923
- Administrative center: Ilyinsky

Area
  - Total: 3,069 km^{2} (1,185 sq mi)

Population (2010 Census)
  - Total: 19,634
  - Density: 6.398/km^{2} (16.57/sq mi)
  - Urban: 51.7%
  - Rural: 48.3%

Administrative structure
  - Inhabited localities: 1 cities/towns, 173 rural localities

Municipal structure
  - Municipally incorporated as: Ilyinsky Municipal District
  - Municipal divisions: 1 urban settlements, 6 rural settlements
- Time zone: UTC+5 (MSK+2)
- OKTMO ID: 57520000
- Website: http://ilinsk.ru

Ilyinsky District (Russian: Ильи́нский райо́н) is an administrative district (raion) of Perm Krai, Russia; one of the thirty-three in the krai. Municipally, it is incorporated as Ilyinsky Municipal District. It is located in the center of the krai in the basin of the Kama River and its tributaries the Obva and the Chyormoz. The area of the district is 3,069 square kilometers (1,185 sq mi). Its administrative center is the rural locality (a settlement) of Ilyinsky. Population: 19,634 (2010 census); 21,141 (2002 census); 24,646 (1989 Soviet census). The population of the administrative center accounts for 32.0% of the district's total population.

== History ==
The district was established in December 1923.

== Economy ==
The economy of the district is based on agriculture, forestry, engineering, food, and printing industries.

== Demographics ==
Russians at 95.3% and the Komi-Permyak people at 1.7% are the predominant ethnic groups in the district.

== Notable residents ==
- Nina Averina (born 1935 in Ilyinsky), writer
- Sergei Teploukhov (1888–1934), archaeologist

== Sources ==
- Законодательное собрание Пермской области. Закон №416-67 от 28 февраля 1996 г. «Об административно-территориальном устройстве Пермского края», в ред. Закона №504-ПК от 9 июля 2015 г. «О внесении изменений в Закон Пермской области "Об административно-территориальном устройстве Пермского края"». Вступил в силу с момента опубликования. Опубликован: "Звезда", №38, 12 марта 1996 г. (Legislative Assembly of Perm Oblast. Law #416-67 of February 28, 1996 On the Administrative-Territorial Structure of Perm Krai, as amended by the Law #504-PK of July 9, 2015 On Amending the Law of Perm Oblast "On the Administrative-Territorial Structure of Perm Krai". Effective as of the moment of publication.).
- Законодательное собрание Пермской области. Закон №1731-353 от 10 ноября 2004 г. «Об утверждении границ и о наделении статусом муниципальных образований Ильинского района Пермского края», в ред. Закона №273-ПК от 14 декабря 2013 г. «О внесении изменений в отдельные Законы Пермской области, Коми-Пермяцкого автономного округа, Пермского края». Вступил в силу через десять дней со дня официального опубликования. Опубликован: "Бюллетень Законодательного Собрания и администрации Пермской области", №12, I часть, 9 декабря 2004 г. (Legislative Assembly of Perm Oblast. Law #1731-353 of November 10, 2004 On Establishing the Borders and on Granting the Status to the Municipal Formations of Ilyinsky District of Perm Krai, as amended by the Law #273-PK of December 14, 2013 On Amending Various Laws of Perm Oblast, Komi-Permyak Autonomous Okrug, Perm Krai. Effective as of the day which is ten days following the day of the official publication.).
