= Podbornaya =

Podbornaya Подборная
- Selo
- Location within Perm Krai Location within Russia
- Coordinates: 58°35′N 55°37′E
- Country: Russia
- Region: Perm Krai
- District: Ilyinsky District
- Time zone: UTC+5:00

Podbornaya (Russian: Подбо́рная) is a rural locality (a selo) and the administrative center of Ivanovskoye Rural Settlement, Ilyinsky District, Perm Krai, Russia. The population was 5 as of 2010.

== Geography ==
Podbornaya is located 18 km northwest of Ilyinsky (the district's administrative centre) by road. Tikhonovshchina is the nearest rural locality.
