= Severny Kommunar =

Severny Kommunar Северный Коммунар
- Settlement
- Location within Perm Krai Location within Russia
- Coordinates: 58°22′N 54°00′E
- Country: Russia
- Region: Perm Krai
- District: Sivinsky District
- Time zone: UTC+5:00

Severny Kommunar (Russian: Се́верный Коммуна́р) is a rural locality (a settlement) and the administrative center of Severokommunarskoye Rural Settlement, Sivinsky District, Perm Krai, Russia. The population was 1,625 as of 2010. There are 41 streets.

== Geography ==
Severny Kommunar is located on the Malaya Siva River, 24 km west of Siva (the district's administrative centre) by road. Yefimovo is the nearest rural locality.
