= Chyormoz =

Town in Perm Krai, Russia

Chyormoz Чёрмоз
- Town
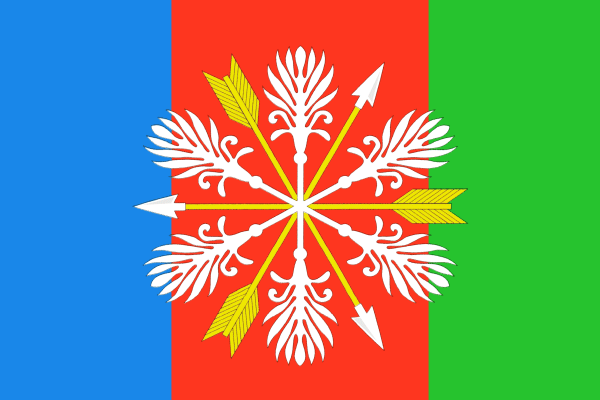
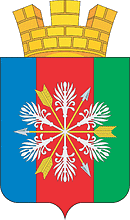
- Flag Coat of arms
- Interactive map of Chyormoz
- Location of Chyormoz Chyormoz (Perm Krai)
- Coordinates: 58°47′N 56°10′E
- Country: Russia
- Federal subject: Perm Krai
- Administrative district: Ilyinsky District
- Founded: 1701
- Town status since: 1943
- Elevation: 125 m (410 ft)

Population (2010 Census)
  - Total: 3,861
  - Estimate (2023): 2,919 (−24.4%)

Municipal status
  - Municipal district: Ilyinsky Municipal District
  - Urban settlement: Chyormozskoye Urban Settlement
  - Capital of: Chyormozskoye Urban Settlement
- Time zone: UTC+5 (MSK+2)
- Postal code: 617040
- Dialing code: +7 34276
- OKTMO ID: 57759000006

Chyormoz (Russian: Чёрмоз, Russian pronunciation: [ˈtɕɵrməs]) is a town in Ilyinsky District of Perm Krai, Russia, located on the shores of the Kama Reservoir, 102 kilometers (63 mi) north of Perm, the administrative center of the krai. Population: 3,861 (2010 census); 4,376 (2002 census); 5,907 (1989 Soviet census)..

== History ==
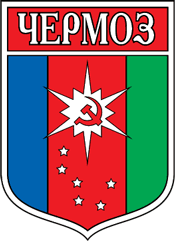
Historical coat of arms of Chyormoz

It was founded in 1701. In 1763 baron Nikolay Stroganov founded a steel mill in Chyormoz, which was later sold to Ivan Lazarev. In 1943 Chyormoz was granted town status. In 1956, the mill was closed, as it was in a flood zone of the Kama Reservoir.

== Administrative and municipal status ==
Within the framework of administrative divisions, Chyormoz is subordinated to Ilyinsky District. As a municipal division, the town of Chyormoz, together with twelve rural localities, is incorporated within Ilyinsky Municipal District as Chyormozskoye Urban Settlement.

Before 1959 the town was the seat of Chyormozsky District.
