= Petrushonki =

Petrushonki (Russian: Петрушонки) is the name of several rural localities in Russia.

== Modern localities ==
- Petrushonki, Perm Krai, a village in Sivinsky District of Perm Krai
- Petrushonki, Pskov Oblast, a village in Pytalovsky District of Pskov Oblast

== Abolished localities ==
- Petrushonki, Kostroma Oblast, a village in Semenovsky Selsoviet of Vokhomsky District of Kostroma Oblast; abolished on October 6, 2004
