= 5 km =

5 km may refer to:

- 5K run
- 5 km (village)
