= Loyno =

Loyno may refer to:

- Loyno (rural locality), name of several rural localities in Russia
- Loyola University New Orleans, a university in the United States referred to as LoyNO
