= Slavists case =

Political lawsuit against Russian philologists in the USSR

The Slavists Case (Russian: Дело славистов, Delo slavistov) or the Russian National Party Case (Russian: Дело «Российской национальной партии», Delo Rossiyskoy natsional’noy partii) was a fabricated criminal case during the Stalinist repressions in the Soviet Union. A large number of intellectuals (mainly from Moscow and Leningrad) were accused of “counterrevolutionary activities” in 1933–1934.

== Background ==
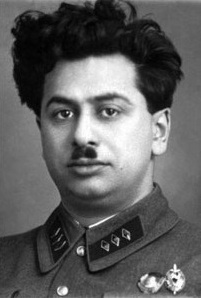
Genrikh Lyushkov

As in the earlier Academic Trial, the goals appear to have been the centralization of Soviet science and the suppression of the old academic tradition. The large number of linguists among the detainees is explained by the beginning of the incursion of the communist state in the field of linguistics, in particular, the forcible introduction of the japhetic theory. The arrests began in 1933, but the case was fabricated gradually, the "Russian National Party" began to appear in it only in February 1934. Genrikh Lyushkov played the key role in the "investigation".

== Stages and persons involved ==
The defendants can be divided into four groups.

1. The first to be arrested on charges of involvement in “the organization of Ukrainian nationalists" were Fyodor Khovaiko and V. G. Shyiko. Their case was investigated independently of the others.
2. The second group included Leningrad and Moscow art critics and ethnographers: the head of the Ukrainian department of the Russian Museum B. G. Kryzhanovsky, his colleagues Sychev and Drozdovsky, restorer and architect Baranovsky and Ukrainian ethnographer Lebedeva.
3. The third group included Moscow intellectuals from the "G. A. Tyurk circle", where Russian architecture was studied, and a group of people far from Slavic studies (geologist V. M. Chernov and others).
4. Finally the fourth and largest group were Moscow-based slavists (Corresponding Members of the USSR Academy of Sciences Nikolay Durnovo (already expelled from the Belarusian Academy), Grigory Ilyinsky, Afanasy Selishchev, Durnovo's son A. N. Durnovo and his fiancée Varvara Trubetskaya, Varvara's father writer Vladimir Trubetskoy, professors Viktor Vinogradov, K. V. Kvitka, P. A. Rastorguev, N. L. Tunitsky, I. G. Golanov, V. F. Rzhiga, etc.).

In September 1933, in parallel with the investigation in Moscow, the "Leningrad case of the Russian National Party" began, in which 37 ethnographers and art critics, as well as chemists and geologists were arrested. Among them, Slavic philologists and Russianists were only five: Academic Secretary of the Slavic studies institute Vasily Korablyov, specialist in Ukrainian literature K.A. Koperzhinsky, employees of the academy's library Shcheglova and Nikolskaya and literary critic Kulla. The "Leningrad case" involved workers from two of the country's largest museums: the Russian Museum and the Hermitage. Major art critics Neradovsky and Schmitt represented the art department of the Russian Museum. Founder of the Soviet school of copyists of ancient paintings L.A. Durnovo, a prominent specialist in Byzantine and Russian art N.V. Malitsky and Caucasian studies expert A.A. Miller also worked in this museum.

Chemists and geologists were also involved in "Leningrad RNP case" (Razuvaev, Andreevsky, Valyashko, Lichkov). Andreevsky and Valyashko were closely associated with the largest scientist in inorganic chemistry, Academician Kurnakov, while Lichkov - with Academician Vernadsky, with whom he worked in the Commission for the Study of the productive forces. Kurnakov and Vernadsky were mentioned in the case as the RNP leaders, but were not arrested. A prominent scientist G.A. Bonch-Osmolovsky also was among the arrested. In addition, complaints were received on Mykhailo Hrushevsky, Nikolay Zelinsky, Dmitry Ushakov, Dmitry Svyatopolk-Mirsky, Nikolai Gudziy, Marfa Schepkina, emigrant Vladimir Ipatieff.

== Accusations ==
Those arrested in the "Leningrad RNP case" were accused, in particular, of "leading a wide national-fascist propaganda of a pan-slavic character, widely using the legal possibilities of scientific and museum work for this purpose", created and preserved exhibitions in halls dedicated to Russian pre-revolutionary art, which "tendentiously emphasized the power and beauty of the old pre-revolutionary system and the greatest achievements of its art."

According to the investigation, the scientists belonged to the fascist party, whose actions were coordinated from abroad. Prince Trubetskoy, as well as Roman Jakobson, Pyotr Bogatyryov and Max Vasmer were named the main "foreign inspirers".

“The program guidelines of the organization were based on the ideas put forward by the leader of the fascist movement abroad — Prince N.S. Trubetskoy. Their essence is the following:

1. The primacy of the nation over the class. The overthrow of the dictatorship of the proletariat and the establishment of a national government.
2. True nationalism, and hence the struggle to preserve the original culture, customs, way of life and historical traditions of the Russian people.
3. Preservation of religion as a force contributing to the rise of the Russian national spirit.
4. The superiority of the "Slavic race", and hence the propaganda of the exclusive historical future of the Slavs as a single nation."

The indictment also includes such items as sabotage (disruption of the development of the sapropel problem, etc.) and terror (accusation of an attempt to assassinate Molotov on the basis that at the beginning of 1933 he visited the electrical plant where one of the arrested persons, Rosenmeyer, had worked). There were many "proofs": Durnovo had a talks with members of the Prague circle and was preparing to become a matchmaker to N. Trubetskoy's brother; Max Vasmer's brother Richard worked in the Hermitage Museum, etc. Some of those arrested (including Korablyov, Durnovo and Richard Vasmer) confessed, others (for example, Selishchev) refused. Friend of Vernadsky geologist Boris Lichkov informed the investigators (under pressure) about the academician's connection with the "Russian National party", but later tried to warn Vernadsky about a possible arrest.

During the investigation Sergei Teploukhov and Nikolai Tunitsky committed suicide, Theodore Fielstrup died from an accident, while Dolgolenko did not survive the torture.

== Trial ==
The trial took place in the spring of 1934; in total more than 70 people were convicted. Lichkov, Razuvaev and Richard Vasmer received 10 years in camps, Korablyov - 10 years of exile, Durnovo and Ilyinsky - 9 years in camps, Selishchev and V. Trubetskoy - five, Bonch-Osmolovsky - three.

After sentencing, on the night of 11/12 April 1934, academicians M. N. Speransky and V. N. Peretz were arrested. On June 16, they were sentenced to three years of exile by a special meeting at the OGPU Collegium. On October 17, a special meeting decided to consider the Speransky verdict conditional. It is assumed that it was done after the address of his brother, the chief Kremlin pediatrician, to Stalin.

In 1937–38 N. and A. Durnovo, as well as Sintsov, Rosenmeyer, Tyurk, Vladimir Trubetskoy, Varvara Trubetskaya, Kryzhanovsky, Ustinov, Ilyinsky, Drozdovsky, Schmitt, Kulla and Avtonomov were again brought to justice and sentenced to death. Malitsky, Neradovsky and Nikolskaya were arrested for the second time. Malitsky died in the Kargopol camp in 1938.

== Aftermath ==
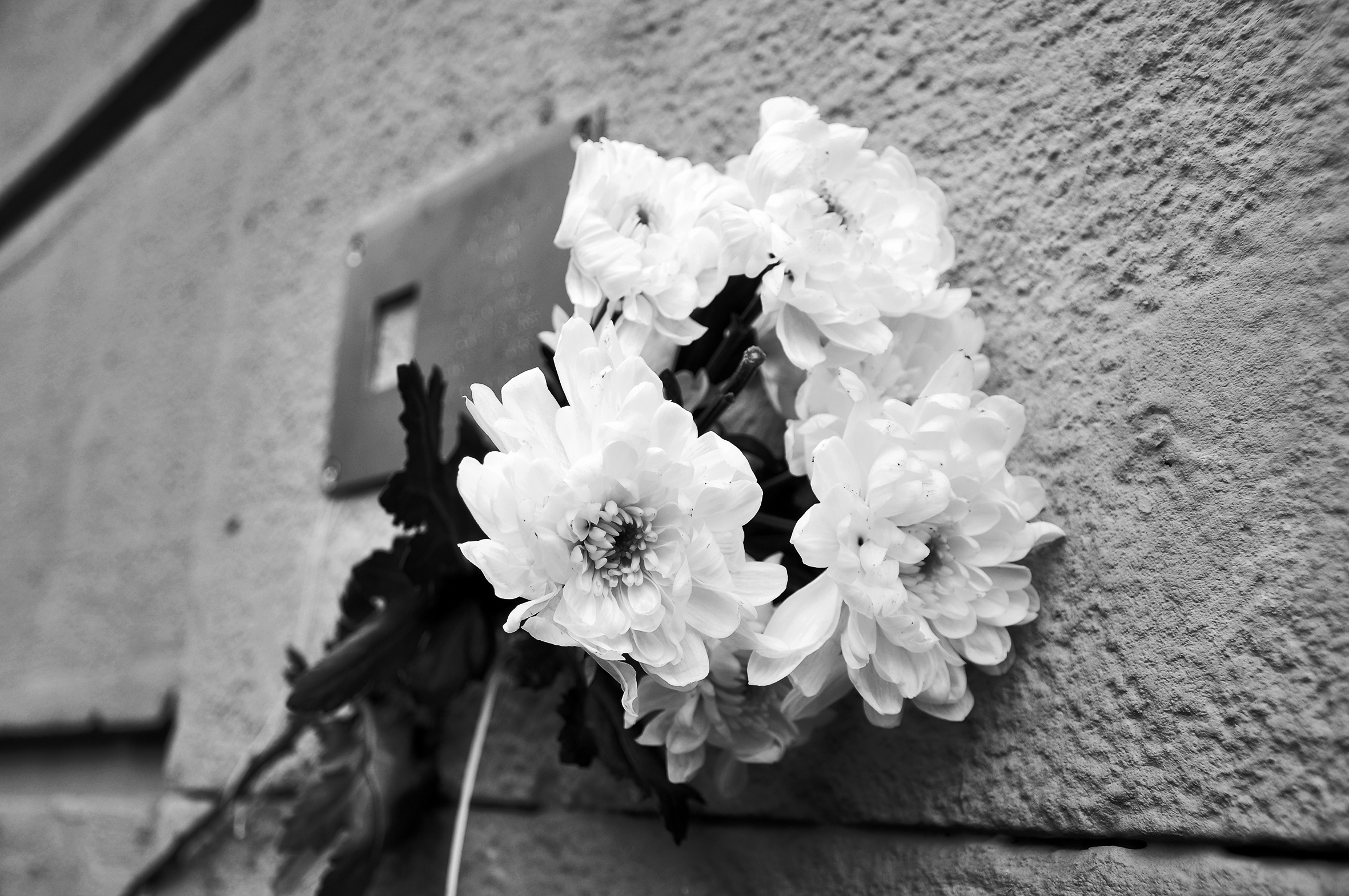
Flowers and the Last Address commemorative plaque on the wall of Nikolai Durnovo's house

The fates of the participants in the case were different. Lichkov was released early after numerous motions from Vernadsky. Vinogradov, re-exiled in 1941–43, was elected an academician and received the Stalin Prize after the war, and after the "discussion on linguistics" in 1950, he actually became the head of Soviet linguistics. Genrikh Lyushkov, who was investigating the case, fled to Japan, where he worked for Japanese intelligence.

The Institute for Slavic Studies reopened after the war.

Nevertheless, Slavic studies in the Soviet Union were not destroyed. It received special support during the Great Patriotic War in connection with Stalin's expansionist plans (since 1943, departments of Slavic philology began to open at major universities). Compliants collected on prominent scientists within the Slavists case remained largely unclaimed. The authorities began to look for new ways of interacting with the intellectual elite.

Those convicted in the Slavists case were rehabilitated: Leningrad case in 1956 and Moscow case in 1964.

== See also ==
- Japhetic theory
- Academic Trial
- Suppressed research in the Soviet Union
  - Alexander Esenin-Volpin
  - Lysenkoism
  - UPTI Affair
