= Richard Vasmer =

Russian and Soviet numismatist and Orientalist-Arabist

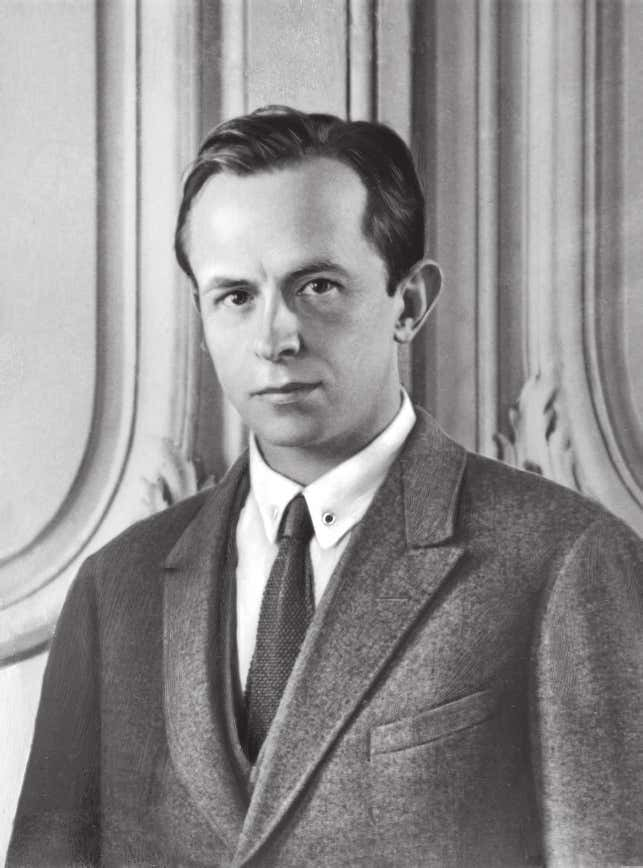
- Born: Richard Wilhelm Georg Vasmer; 9 October 1888; Saint Petersburg, Russian Empire
- Died: 22 February 1938 (aged 49); Tashkent, Soviet Union
- Education: University of Leipzig; Faculty of Oriental Studies, Saint Petersburg Imperial University (1910)
- Known for: Researcher of Islamic numismatics
- Scientific career
- Fields: Numismatics, Oriental studies, Arabist
- Workplaces: Hermitage Museum; GAIMK
- Doctoral advisor: V. V. Bartold; P. K. Kokovtsov
- Notable students: A. A. Bykov

Richard Richardovich Vasmer (German: Richard Wilhelm Georg Vasmer; Russianized forms: Roman Romanovich, Richard Richardovich, or Georgiy Richardovich; 9 October 1888 – 22 February 1938) was a Russian and Soviet numismatist and Orientalist-Arabist. According to I. Yu. Krachkovsky, Vasmer was "our foremost expert on Eastern, especially Muslim, numismatics". He was a foreign corresponding member of the Royal Swedish Academy of Letters, History and Antiquities (1929). Vasmer was the younger brother of the renowned German linguist, Slavist, and Balkanist Max Vasmer.

Vasmer was born into a family of Russian Germans. He graduated from the Karl May Gymnasium, Leipzig University, and Saint Petersburg Imperial University. He was invited to work at the Hermitage Museum, where he cataloged Arabic coins in the museum's collection. He participated in World War I. In 1918, he returned to the Hermitage, serving as secretary of the Numismatics and Glyptics Section of the State Academy of the History of Material Culture. He was the chief curator of Eastern numismatics at the Hermitage until his arrest. Until 1925, he worked on the first Soviet exhibition of Eastern coins, after which he devoted himself entirely to scholarly work.

He primarily studied the circulation of Arabic coins in medieval Eastern Europe, as well as numismatics as a source for the history of Eastern states. He pioneered research on coin hoard analysis, engaging in cartography and systematization of numismatic finds. He published over 50 works, with extensive unpublished manuscripts preserved in archives. Arrested in 1934 on fabricated charges in the "Russian National Party case", he was sentenced to ten years in a corrective labor camp. He died in a camp in Tashkent at the age of 49. He was rehabilitated in 1956.

== Biography ==
=== Childhood and education ===
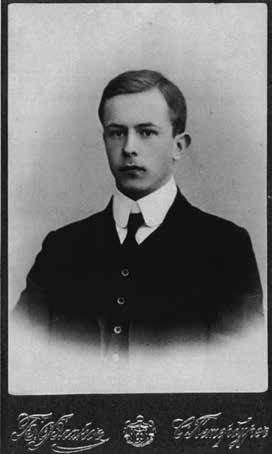
Photograph taken before 1912.

Vasmer was born on 9 October 1888 at 11 a.m. in a merchant family of Russian Germans (subjects of the German Empire) in Saint Petersburg. His father was Richard Julius Friedrich Vasmer (1853, Altona, Kingdom of Denmark – 1924, Berlin, Weimar Republic); his mother was Amalia Maria Julia, née Schaub (1862, Saint Petersburg – 1935, Berlin), daughter of academic architect K. A. E. Schaub. Max and Richard Jr. (Note: Grandson of writer N. P. Wagner, son of sailor and artist P. I. Wagner; shot in 1938.) had an older sister, Maria. Richard was baptized in the Evangelical Lutheran rite on 16 January 1889 (Old Style). His godparent was V. V. Schaub.

In 1906, Vasmer enrolled in the Faculty of Philosophy at Leipzig University, studying until 1907. He studied Turkish, Persian, Arabic languages, and Arabic literature under Professor Hans Stumme. On 16 August 1907, he applied for admission to the "Arabic-Persian-Turkish-Tatar Department" of the Faculty of Oriental Studies, Saint Petersburg Imperial University, studying until 6 October 1910. At the university, Vasmer attended lectures by P. K. Kokovtsov on Semitic epigraphy, Hebrew, and Syriac, lectures by V. V. Bartold on Islamic numismatics, and lectures by N. A. Mednikov, V. A. Zhukovsky, A. E. Schmidt, and A. N. Samoylovich. He also attended courses on Arabic language and literature, Greek, Latin, Persian language and literature, Ottoman language and literature, Turkic dialects, history of the East, ancient Eastern history, introduction to linguistics, logic, and German. He was fluent in Arabic, Persian, Turkish, Hebrew, Ancient Greek, Latin, and several modern European languages. Vasmer graduated with a first-class diploma and was invited to the Hermitage Museum to work on inventorying Eastern coins.

=== Career ===
There were many uncataloged exhibits in the Hermitage-museum, so there was established a special commission in 1908 to address this issue. The numismatics department had only two curators: head A. K. Markov and O. F. Retowski. The museum began hiring "inventory clerks" — employees for cataloging (the first, V. R. Focht, was hired in 1905, working until 1906). By 1909, under Markov and Retowski, four non-staff employees worked in the Numismatics Department: Focht again, S. A. Gamalov-Churaev, K. I. Simonalevich, and G. B. Meyer. In 1910, V. A. Shugaevsky and Vasmer were hired, followed by V. M. Alekseev and N. P. Bauer.

Vasmer received Russian citizenship on 24 September 1910 and was hired by the Hermitage on the same day. He worked as a research fellow and curator (assistant curator) of the Hermitage's Numismatics Department from 1910, officially on staff since 1 January 1911. That day, he was granted the rank of Collegiate Secretary. On 20 February 1911, by order of the Ministry of the Imperial Court, he was assigned to the Imperial Hermitage (some sources say 11 January 1911). Since 22 December 1910, he was a collaborating member of the Imperial Russian Archaeological Society. He delivered 16 papers at its meetings from 1913 to 1924.

In 1911, Vasmer petitioned the rector of Saint Petersburg University to enroll as a non-degree student in the Faculty of Oriental Languages' Jewish-Arabic-Syriac section. Around 1910–1916, he prepared an eight-volume catalog of Kufic coins in the Hermitage, including coins from nearly all pre-Mongol Muslim dynasties, Muslim exagia, (Note: Exagium — a coin weight in the form of stamped plates.) weights, and stamps (stored in the Eastern Coins Cabinet of the Hermitage's Numismatics Department).

Buildings associated with Vasmer

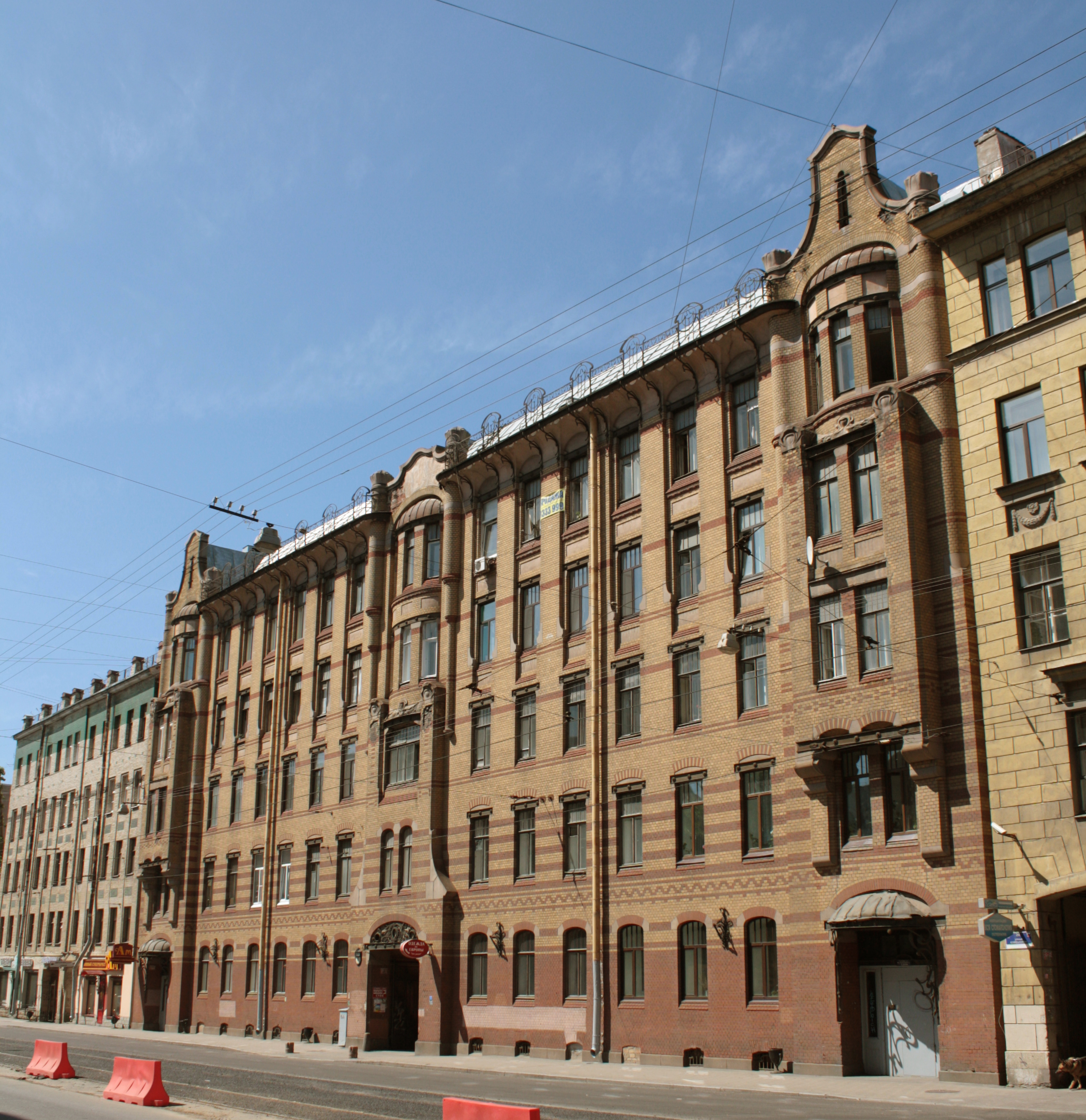
House 22 on Bolshaya Dvoryanskaya/1st Street of Derevenskaya Bednota — Schulze Apartment Building. Vasmer lived here in apartment No. 26.

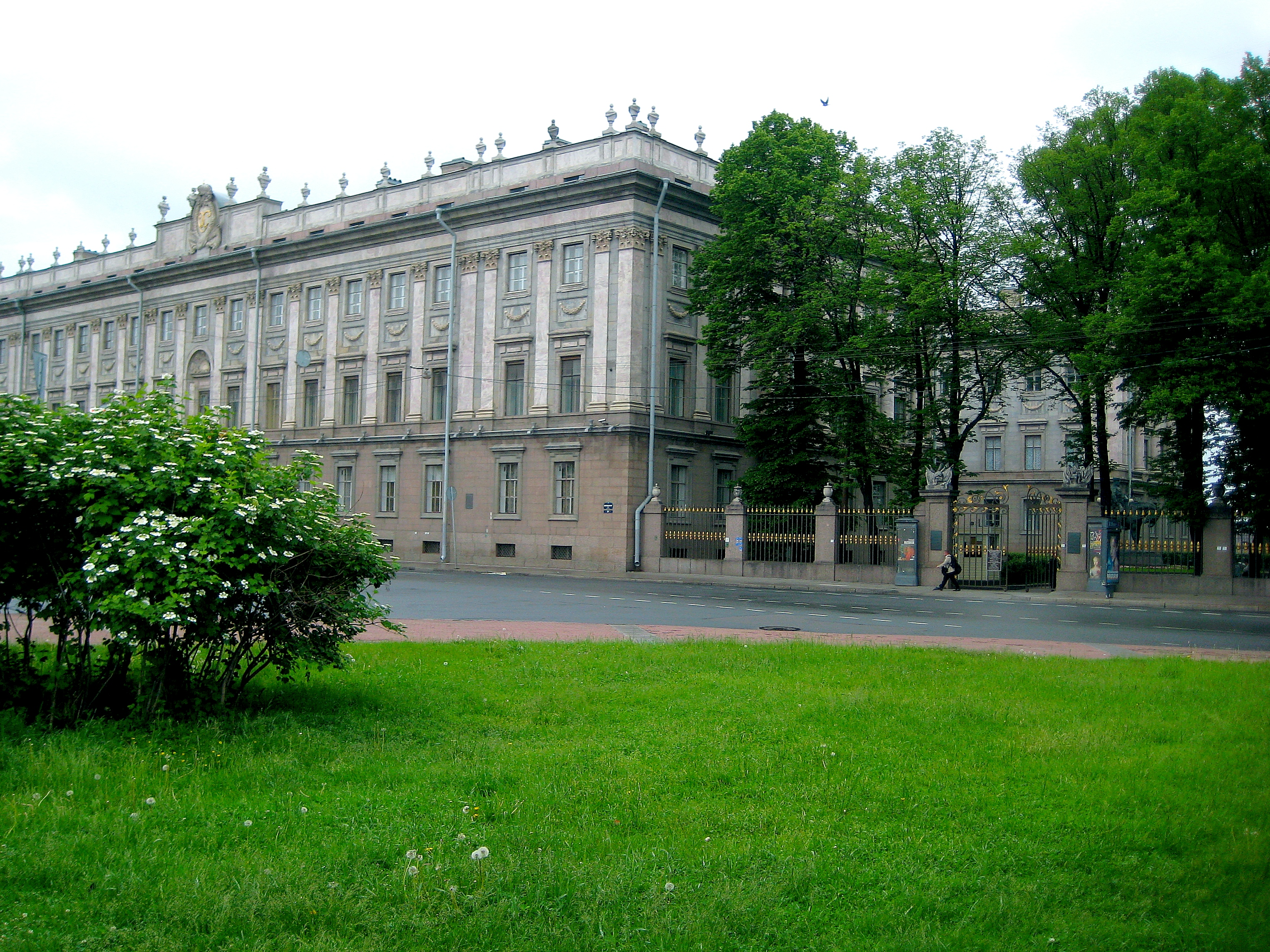
House 5A on Stepan Khalturin Street — Marble Palace. The State Academy of the History of Material Culture was located here from 1919 to 1936.

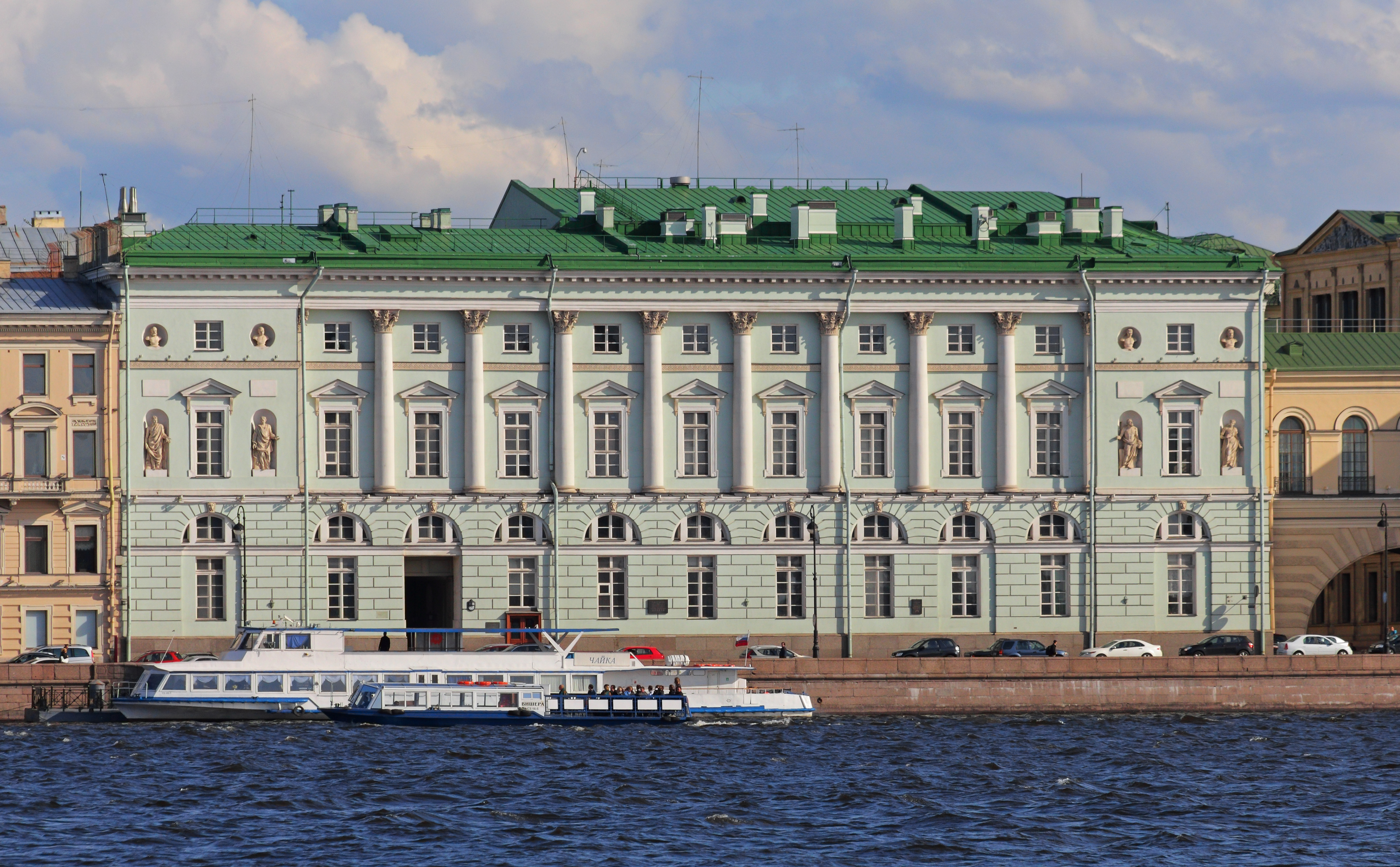
House 32 on 9th January Embankment — Hermitage Theatre building. Vasmer lived here in 1934 in apartment No. 7.

On 3 January 1914, Vasmer was granted the rank of Titular Councillor. On 26 October of the same year, he married Alida Pavlovna Nipp (1892–?), a subject of the German Empire. At the time of Vasmer's arrest, Alida worked as an assistant accountant at the Volodarsky Sewing Factory.

In 1914, Vasmer managed the Hermitage's coin department for two months. During World War I, in November 1915, he enrolled in the Nikolaev Engineering School, after which, in 1916, he was assigned to the 1st Rear Motorcycle Workshop. He was demobilized in spring 1918. In September 1918, Vasmer returned to the Hermitage as an assistant, and in the same year was appointed curator of Eastern coins. His brother Max emigrated from Russia the previous year, eventually settling in Germany.

From 1918, Richard was a member of the Hermitage Council, remaining so until its dissolution in 1926. In early December 1918, he signed a collective letter to People's Commissar of Culture Anatoly Lunacharsky and Vladimir Lenin requesting that exhibits evacuated to Moscow by the Russian Provisional Government not be displayed but returned to Petrograd for safekeeping. The letter was sent by Maxim Gorky, who added his signature. The Moscow exhibition was canceled, and by early 1920, all exhibits were returned to the Hermitage.

Since 13 December 1919, Vasmer worked as a research fellow in the Permanent Commission (later Section) of Numismatics and Glyptics of the Russian Academy of the History of Material Culture (RAIMK, later GAIMK). Later, he was appointed secretary of the section. He compiled protocols for nearly 500 meetings. From 1919 to 1929, he delivered over 100 reports and presentations to the Commission.

In autumn 1920, after A. K. Markov's death, Vasmer succeeded him as chief curator of Eastern coins at the Hermitage. In reality, the department was led by A. A. Ilyin after Markov. On 20 March 1923, he was elected secretary of the Numismatic Section of the Russian Archaeological Society, serving until its dissolution in 1924. In 1925, under Vasmer's leadership, the Hermitage hosted the first Soviet exhibition of coins from the Near, Middle, and Far East and European colonies in the East. After the exhibition, he was able to devote sufficient time to scholarly research.

In 1927, Vasmer was elected a member of the Society of Archaeology, History, and Ethnography at Kazan University. On 4 June 1929, he was elected a foreign corresponding member of the Royal Swedish Academy of Letters, History and Antiquities.Valiev 2012, p. 297 In 1929, GAIMK underwent a "purge of class-alien elements," dismissing over half its staff, and the Numismatics and Glyptics Section was disbanded. On 14 December 1930, Vasmer was dismissed by order No. 92/289 alongside prominent scholars like D. K. Zelenin and A. A. Spitsyn. or on 15 December 1931. On 11 March or 1 October 1930, Vasmer was reappointed head of the Eastern Numismatics Section of the Hermitage. In 1932, he was appointed professor.

=== Fabricated case ===
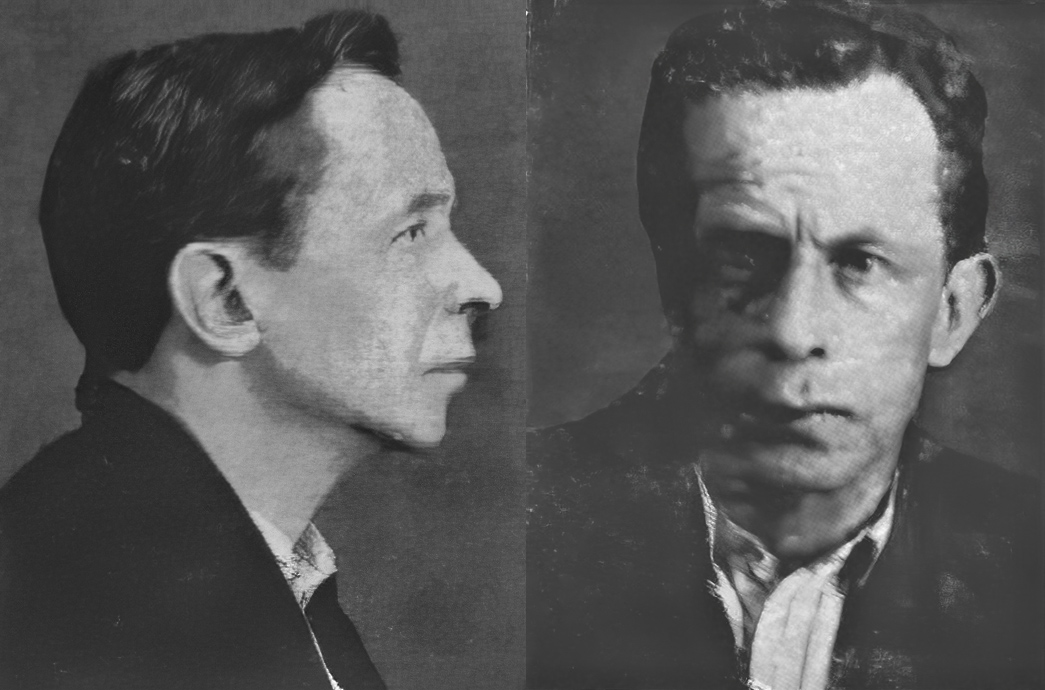
Photo from the investigative file

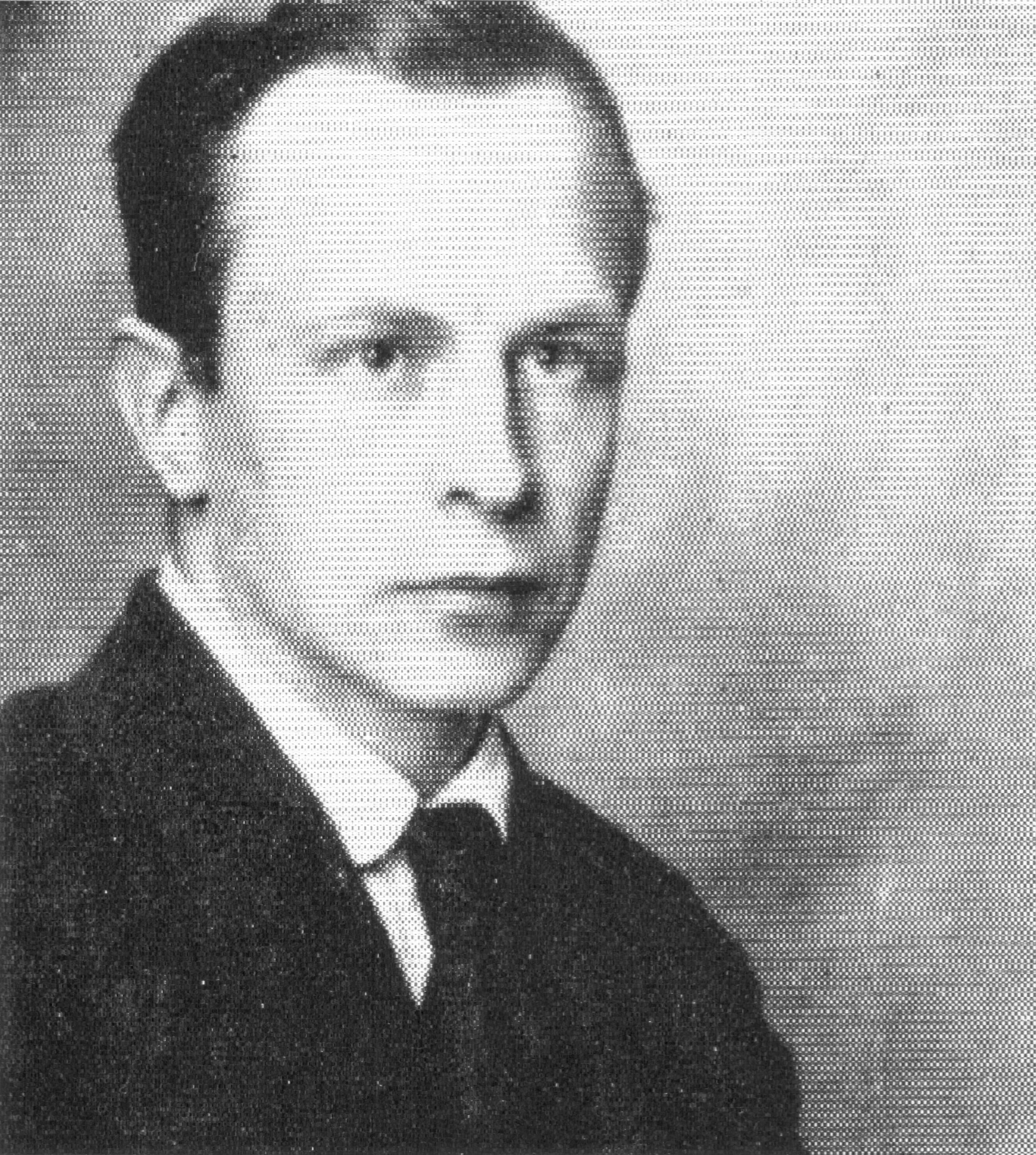
Vasmer between 1929 and 1933

On 10 January 1934, the Plenipotentiary Representation of the OGPU under the NKVD of the USSR in the Leningrad Military District arrested Richard Vasmer in the "Russian National Party case" ("Slavists case"). He was the last (or one of the last) Leningrad resident arrested in this case. He was charged under Article 58 of the Criminal Code of the RSFSR 1926, accused of "being part of a counterrevolutionary fascist organization" (referred to as Richard Richardovich in case documents). His brother Max, a foreign member of the USSR Academy of Sciences, living in Germany, was falsely labeled a national socialist, and Richard was accused of being a "link in illegal communication between the RNP center and fascist circles".

The accusation was fabricated based on three points. Vasmer corresponded with his brother and other relatives in Germany. In summer 1933, at Max's request, Richard obtained a certificate of Max's "Aryan" origin from a pastor of a still-operating church in Leningrad, sending it to Germany with a note that it was "not for use in Soviet Russia". In 1932, a female employee of the German Embassy in Russia (or her sister), who had attended Max Vasmer's university lectures, visited Richard's apartment, offering to help his family relocate to Germany; this visit was deemed "transmission of espionage information". Vasmer transferred money for his brother through academic V. I. Vernadsky, who traveled to Germany. From 1929 for two years, Vasmer regularly visited Vernadsky, receiving 100 rubles every two months: Vernadsky supported Richard's family, while Max sent money to Vernadsky's daughter in Prague. These funds were allegedly for the "organization," and conversations between Vernadsky and Richard were deemed "knowledge transfer".

Vasmer was labeled the head of "cell No. 8," allegedly including I. G. Spassky, N. P. Bauer, A. N. Zograf, G. Yu. Walter, A. A. Avtonomov, and E. I. Lindros. (Note: Also known as E. I. Lindroz (28 January 1884, Moscow – after 1956), a Hermitage researcher of weapons studies. Arrested on 1 December 1933, sentenced to ten years in camps, served in Siblag and Ust-Izhma, detained in camp due to the war until 1945. From December 1945, he was a watchman in a forestry enterprise in Pestovsky District, Novgorod Oblast, living there at the time of rehabilitation. Rehabilitated on 28 November 1956.) Spassky, Avtonomov, and Lindros were implicated to suggest preparation of terrorist acts: a Kharkov exhibition of antique weapons involving Hermitage exhibits was allegedly intended for "arming insurgent groups." In reality, Avtonomov and Lindros prepared exhibits (both were weapons collectors), while Spassky, who worked in the Kharkov museum until 1931, was uninvolved. Vasmer admitted his "guilt".

Before Vasmer, on 5 January, Maria Pavlovna Nipp (15 January 1892 – after 1956), his wife's sister, living in his apartment, was arrested in the same case. Nipp managed the office of "Zagotzerno" and had a gymnasium education. According to some testimonies, Vasmer received German journals from his brother, and Nipp shared their content (including Nazi propaganda) with colleagues. She was exiled to Bashkiria for three years. At the time of her rehabilitation in 1956, she lived in Luga, Leningrad Oblast. She was rehabilitated on 28 November 1956.

=== In the camps ===
Vasmer was dismissed from the Hermitage on 11 March 1934; at the time of his arrest, he held the position of professor. He was sentenced to ten years in a correctional labor camp on 29 March 1934 by the OGPU collegium. He served in Bamlag, then in a camp in Tashkent. (Note: Alternatively, the camp sentence was immediately replaced with exile to Tashkent. Some sources state that on 4 April 1934, Vasmer was sent to Svobodny in Bamlag, and on 25 May 1934, he was in Uzbekistan. Some sources mention his exile to Tashkent as "unconfirmed.") In both camps, he worked in the office of the Central Asian Labor Camps Administration. In 1935, his wife made apparently futile efforts to secure permission for him to work in Tashkent museums in his field. She wrote to Vernadsky, who was unaffected by the case, and he wrote to I. Yu. Krachkovsky. Alida Pavlovna's letter:

Richard Richardovich Vasmer is in a concentration camp in the city of Tashkent and works in the Administration of Central Asian Camps (Tashkent, Lenin St., 31). He works in the office on various tasks, such as filing papers, courier delivery, etc. My request is that you employ my husband (like many other scholars) in his specialty. For example:

1) In Tashkent, there is a Museum (Lenin St., corner of Karl Marx St.), where Eastern coins are stored unpacked in boxes;

2) In Samarkand, there is also a Museum, where the late archaeologist Vyatkin worked; as Richard Richardovich informed, there is still no replacement there.

R. R. Vasmer has worked at the Hermitage for 24 years. During these years, and published 54 researches; except for one, all were published after 1917. A specialist's review and request regarding R. R. Vasmer would provide grounds for changing his employment from clerical work to his specialty.

Vernadsky's letter:

15 June 1935

Dear Ignaty Yulianovich, In the rush of our meeting, I completely forgot to discuss whether anything can be done for R. R. Vasmer. He is said to be experiencing his confinement in Tashkent very heavily. They say there would be work in his specialty there — unprocessed numismatic material. His wife says that a specialist’s review and request could greatly facilitate his assignment to scholarly work. This would significantly ease his situation. I attach her letter. Perhaps someone could help better utilize his expertise.

Best regards,

Yours, V. Vernadsky

=== Death and rehabilitation ===
Vasmer died on 22 February 1938 Some sources suggest he died in 1936 from pneumonia in Separate Labor Reeducation Camp (or Separate Camp Point) No. 19 of the Ministry of Internal Affairs of the Uzbek Soviet Socialist Republic. His exact burial place is unknown. Max Vasmer learned of his brother's death only after World War II. He was rehabilitated on 28 November 1956 by the Military Tribunal of the Leningrad Military District. The rehabilitation decree stated: "…no objective evidence of the guilt of those involved in the case existed, and additional investigation materials indicate the case was fabricated through coerced confessions and false accusations of innocent individuals".

== Contributions ==
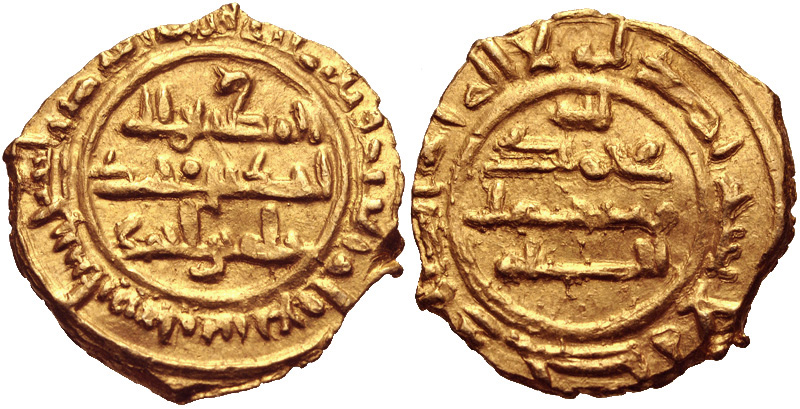
Coin of Abu Ja'far Ahmad ibn Muhammad, Saffarid emir. 958–959

From 1910, Vasmer worked on cataloging Eastern coins at the Hermitage. His primary interest was Kufic coins (coins with inscriptions in the Kufic script) and their circulation in Eastern Europe. His first article, published in 1914, addressed this topic. His work was interrupted by World War I. Upon returning, he prepared for the Hermitage exhibition, with his most productive period being 1925–1934, during which he published 47 articles (51 works in total). His works, published in Russian, German, and English, appeared in journals in Petrograd/Leningrad, Kazan, Baku, Vienna, Tallinn, Munich, Helsinki, and Bombay. Several articles were published in Berlin and Tartu after his arrest. Twenty-two unpublished manuscripts are preserved in the Hermitage archives.

Vasmer's articles were published in leading numismatic journals of his time: The Numismatic Chronicle, Zeitschrift für Numismatik, Berliner Münzblätter, Numismatische Zeitschrift, and others. He wrote for the English and German versions of the Encyclopaedia of Islam and for the international encyclopedic Dictionary of Numismatics (Wörterbuch der Münzkunde / Herausgegeber F. von Schrötter. — Berlin, Leipzig: Walter de Gruyter, 1930). He was the compiler of its entire Eastern section.

His research spanned historical (monetary circulation history) and documentary (archaeological find summaries, informational reports) directions; he did not publish purely analytical summaries separately but included their material in commentaries on individual hoard analyses. Of his published works, six focused on Sasanian coins, one on Bactrian coins. He also studied the numismatics of the Golden Horde.

Vasmer's main field was Eastern European hoards in relation to the classification of Islamic coins from the 8th to 11th centuries. M. B. Sverdlov wrote that "R. R. Vasmer's works were conducted in three main directions: studying the composition of Eastern coin hoards found in Eastern Europe and Finland; compiling a topography of Kufic coin hoards in Eastern Europe; and the numismatics of Eastern countries and the study of their political and dynastic history".

=== Study of Eastern European hoards with Arabic coins ===
Vasmer published studies on hoards containing Arab dirhams found in Russia, accompanied by detailed historical notes on complex and rare issues. His primary publications include the compositions of the Pereyaslavl hoard (1914), Novgorod (1925), Vitebsk (1925), and Stary Dedyin (1929) from Belarus, Ugodichevsky (1925) from Yaroslavl Oblast, Luurila (1927) from Finland, Zavalishensky (1931) from Belgorod Oblast Friedrichshof and othersSverdlov 1973, pp. 217. According to the assessment of Swedish numismatist Ulla Linder Welin, made in 1976, Vasmer's description of the Stary Dedyin hoard is "the most thoroughly worked out scientific publication of a Russian coin find in modern times". In 1930, Vasmer prepared a detailed manuscript describing the large Bezlyudovsky hoard of 1,200 dirhams found near Kharkiv; the coin catalog he compiled for this hoard was published only in 2014.

=== Periodization of dirham circulation in Eastern Europe ===
Based on his work with these hoards, Vasmer drew conclusions about the patterns of dirham influx into Eastern Europe, noting differences in the composition of Arab coin hoards found in the region. "The first to view Kufic hoards as systematically formed coin complexes rather than random collections was R. R. Vasmer... From a chaotic mass of coins, a hoard became a source reflecting specific patterns. This opened the possibility of scientifically studying a hoard: how it was accumulated and under what circumstances it was buried" (G. A. Fyodorov-Davydov). "R. R. Vasmer's works brought clarity to phenomena previously seen as lacking system" (V. L. Yanin).

Vasmer first expressed the idea of these patterns in a report titled "Topography of Hoards with Ispekhbed Coins," delivered at a meeting of the Numismatics and Glyptics Commission of RAIMK on 23 June 1923. He later developed and refined this idea in articles such as "Kufic Coin Hoard Found in Novgorod in 1920" (1925), "Two Kufic Coin Hoards" (1927), "Zavalishensky Kufic Coin Hoard of the 8th–9th Centuries" (1931), and finally formulated it in the article "On the Publication of a New Topography of Kufic Coin Finds in Eastern Europe" (1933) as follows:

The earliest hoards (800–825 CE) consist almost exclusively of Abbasid dirhams, with a significant proportion of African coins among them. This is followed by a period when the majority still consists of Abbasid dirhams, but these coins are minted in Asia, with a high percentage of coins minted in the domains of the Tahirids and almost no African coins (825–905 CE). The third period (905–960 CE) is characterized by the complete dominance of Samanids. Finally, in the hoards of the fourth period (960–1012 CE), alongside a mass of Samanid dirhams, there are also significant quantities of Buyids and Ziyarids.

"Vasmer, using the example of Eastern coin finds, developed a new historical approach to their systematization and study. He showed how the composition of coin finds systematically changes in certain periods and established that the composition of a find can fairly accurately determine the time of its formation". His observations marked a major breakthrough in the study of Arab numismatics in Europe. The debate between Vasmer and the historian of Rus P. G. Lyubomirov on the interpretation of numismatic data as a historical source was significant in forming the historical conclusions of this article: Lyubomirov believed that Arab dirhams penetrated Eastern Europe as early as the 7th century, while Vasmer noted that hoards with coins from this period were buried only in the 9th century. Finnish archaeologist and numismatist Tuukka Talvio highly values Vasmer's use of data on the die-axes of coins in studying dirham imports.

Vasmer placed his observations within a broad historical context: he "studied the corpus of Eastern European hoards of the 9th–10th centuries with unparalleled thoroughness and reconstructed, based on the typological study of numismatic artifacts and Arab written tradition, the key stages of the compositional dynamics of monetary circulation in the context of the political history of the Islamic civilisation and its neighbors".

Vasmer's periodization was further developed by V. L. Yanin in the monograph "Monetary-Weight Systems of Russian Middle Ages" (1956), who noted that "Vasmer established the foundation without which an in-depth study of Rus monetary circulation would be unthinkable". The accuracy of Vasmer's chronological classification of such hoards has been confirmed by numerous recent finds. The periodization of Kufic dirham circulation in Eastern Europe developed by Vasmer, with some refinements, is still accepted in scholarship today.

=== Conclusions on hoards with Arab coins found in the Baltic and Finland ===
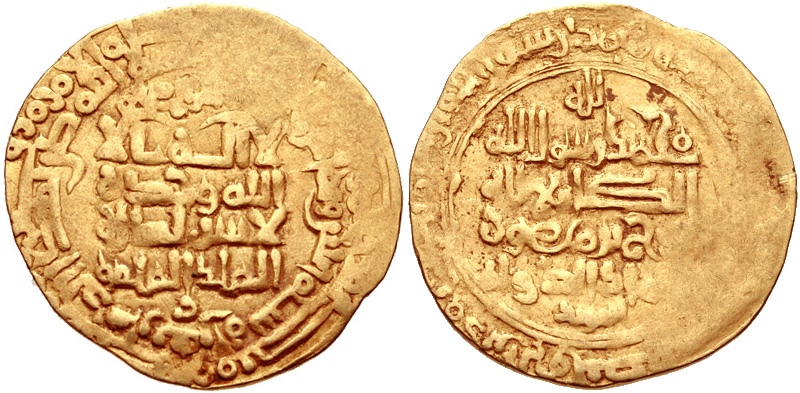
Dinar of Nuh II, Samanid emir. 992–993 CE

Noting differences in the composition of Eastern European and Finnish hoards, Vasmer suggested in the article Die kufischen Münzen des Fundes von Luurila, Kirchspliel Hattula (1927) that dirhams were imported to Finland not from Slavic regions but from the West.

In East Slavic lands, coins of the Samanid emir Nuh II are frequently found, while in Baltic countries such coins are absent, but coins minted by the Marwanids, Uqaylids, and Ilek-khans are present. Vasmer explained in the article Ein im Dorfe Staryi Dedin in Weissrussland gemachter Fund kufischer Münzen (1929) the differences in hoards from the last quarter of the 10th century by political events in Rus that hindered the export of Arab silver, namely the conflicts among the sons of Svyatoslav; this idea was later questioned.

Vasmer was the first to suggest that a coin hoard with Arab legends found in Kohtla-Järve in 1923 reflects Khazar minting — this hypothesis was questioned by V. V. Bartold, but was later confirmed by A. A. Bykov.

== Evaluations and critics ==
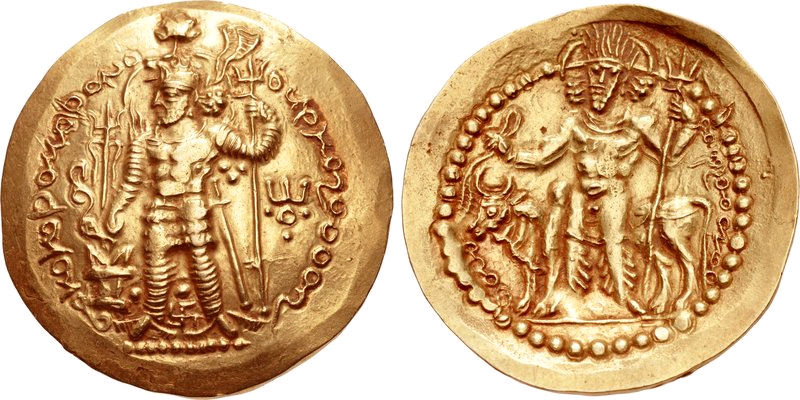
Dinar of Hormizd I Kushanshah, ruler of the Bactrian Kushano-Sasanian Kingdom. Circa 285–300 CE

American historians Professors Thomas S. Noonan and Roman Kovalev describe Fasmer as "the greatest Russian specialist in Islamic numismatics of the 20th century". According to Tuukka Talvio, Fasmer's published works are "an impressive monument to too short a life. Numismatist Eduard von Zambaur described the scholar's activities as "highly fruitful".

As early as 1938, Swedish archaeologist Ture Arne published a brief obituary based on rumors of Fasmer's death, writing:

Richard Fasmer was perhaps the foremost contemporary expert in Eastern numismatics. He worked in this complex field with remarkable speed and confidence and was able to draw interesting and important historical conclusions from the rich coin hoards discovered in the Soviet Union or neighboring countries. Like Russian scholars in general, he was extremely courteous and helpful to colleagues seeking his advice.

The renowned Russian and Soviet Arabist Academician I. Yu. Krachkovsky wrote in his work "Essays on the History of Russian Arabic Studies," first published in 1950 (before Fasmer's rehabilitation), that, thanks to his thorough familiarity with numismatic and narrative materials, Fasmer, "in his exemplary and precise works," "contributed to clarifying a number of issues related to the history of the Caliphate, particularly Central Asia and the Caucasus". The future academician and historian V. L. Yanin described Fasmer's studies as "classic" in his candidate dissertation, defended in 1954, before the numismatist's rehabilitation. Archaeologist V. V. Kropotkin similarly praised Fasmer's works (in the monograph "Economic Connections of Eastern Europe in the First Millennium CE," Moscow, 1967. Historian Professor M. B. Sverdlov highlighted the broad scope of Fasmer's work, the abundance of material, the analysis of sources, and the rigor of his conclusions. According to historian and philologist V. S. Kuleshov:

Fasmer's work style remains an unattainable pinnacle of Eastern numismatics in Russia and worldwide, and is characterized by a close integration of the tasks of documenting coin complexes and typological identification of coins with questions of source studies of the history of Islamic states, dynasties, and regions as reflected in numismatic artifacts and Arabic-language historiography. To an even greater extent than Kh. D. Fren, Fasmer masterfully utilized facts from the Arabic written tradition to clarify questions of the numismatic history of cities (mints), dynasties (issuers), and states (regions of minting) of the Abbasid and post-Abbasid periods. These facts are essential for the most precise identification of coins in Eastern European circulation during the Viking Age. <…> The most significant drawback of R. R. Fasmer's legacy in the field of numismatic source studies is his highly specialized and concentrated style, which is difficult for non-specialists to understand.

== Legacy ==
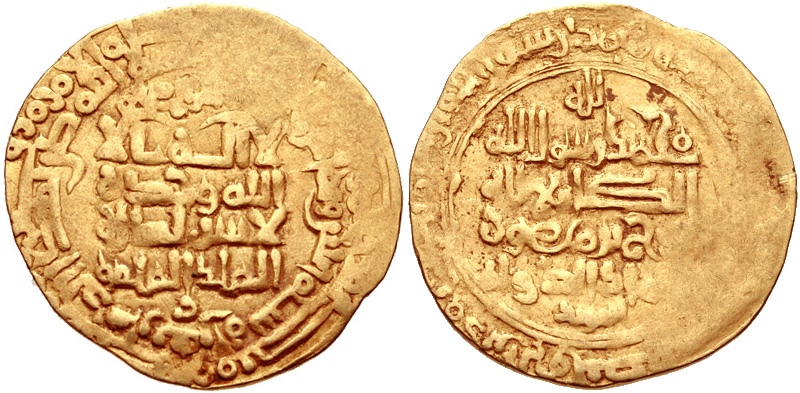
Ceremony for the unveiling of the "Last Address" plaque at the Hermitage Theatre building

To mark the 125th anniversary of Fasmer's birth, the Numismatics Department of the Hermitage held the Fasmer Numismatic Readings on 16 October 2013. To coincide with this anniversary, a collection of articles on the Bezlyudovsky hoard was published in 2014 by the Academy of Sciences of the Republic of Tatarstan.

As part of the "Last Address" project, on 26 October 2017, a commemorative plaque was installed in the courtyard of the Hermitage Theatre at 32 Palace Embankment, where Fasmer lived at the time of his arrest.

Max Fasmer dedicated his famous etymological dictionary to his father and brother, but in the Russian translation of the dictionary, the dedication was removed for political reasons, and it continues to be published without it. Oxford University historian Marek Jankowiak dedicated his article on Arab dirhams to the memory of Richard Fasmer.

== Vasmer's works ==
=== Separate editions ===
1. Vasmer, R. R. (1927). Два клада куфических монет [Two Hoards of Kufic Coins]. State Academy of History of Material Culture: Proceedings of the Numismatic Commission. Vol. VI. Leningrad: Государственная академия истории материальной культуры. pp. VIII + 57 (+ 2 incl.). [Vitebsk and Ugodichev hoards.]
  - Zambaur, Eduard von (1928). "[Rez.]" [[Review]]. Numismatische Zeitschrift (in German): 124–125.
2. Vasmer, R. (1927). Die kufischen Münzen des Fundes von Luurila, Kirchspliel Hattula [The Kufic Coins of the Find from Luurila, Hattula Parish]. Finnish Antiquarian Society Journal = Finnish Antiquarian Society's Journal. Vol. XXXVI, No. 3 (in German). Helsingfors: Finska fornminnesföreningens tidskrift. p. 35.
  - Zambaur, E. (1929). "[Rez.]" [[Review]]. Numismatische Zeitschrift (in German). 22=62 (22=62): 151.
3. Vasmer, R. (1929). Ein im Dorfe Staryĭ Dedin in Weißrußland gemachter Fund kufischer Münzen [A Find of Kufic Coins Made in the Village of Staryi Dedin in Belarus]. Royal Swedish Academy of Letters, History and Antiquities Proceedings, Part 40: 2. Stockholm: Akademiens förlag. p. 45.
  - Zambaur, E. (1929). "[Rez.]" [[Review]]. Numismatische Zeitschrift (in German). 22=62: 151–152.
4. Vasmer, R. (1931). Chronologie der arabischen Statthalters von Armenien unter den Abbasiden, von as-Saffach bis zur Krönung Aschots I., 750—887 [Chronology of the Arab Governors of Armenia under the Abbasids, from as-Saffah to the Coronation of Ashot I, 750—887]. Studies in Armenian History. Vol. V. Vienna: Mechitaristen-Buchdruckerei. pp. X, 116.
  - Translation made by Vahan Inglizyan: Vasmer, R. (1933). translated by Dr. H. Vahan V. Inglizian (ed.). Ժամանակագրութիւնն Հայաստանի ոստիկաններու առաջին Աբբասեանց օրով, Աս-Սաֆֆախէն մինչեւ Աշոտ Ա.ի թագաւորելը 750—887 [Chronology of the Governors of Armenia in the First Days of the Abbasids, from As-Saffah to the Coronation of Ashot I, 750—887]. National Library, Volume 132 (in Armenian). Vienna: Mkhitarian Press. pp. 120, 10. Originally published in parts in the journal Handes Amsorya.
5. Vasmer, R. R. (1931). Завалишенский клад куфических монет VIII—IX вв [Zavalishensky Hoard of Kufic Coins of the 8th—9th Centuries]. Proceedings of the State Academy of History of Material Culture. Vol. VII, Issue 2. Leningrad: Printing House of the USSR Academy of Sciences. p. 20.

=== Articles ===
1. Vasmer, R. R. (1914). "Куфические монеты Переяславского клада" [Kufic Coins of the Pereslavl Hoard]. Proceedings of the Imperial Archaeological Commission (51). Petrograd: 17–66.
2. Vasmer, R. R. (1924). "Новые приобретения Эрмитажа в области куфической нумизматики" [New Acquisitions of the Hermitage in the Field of Kufic Numismatics]. Proceedings of the Russian Academy of History of Material Culture. 3: 305–328.
3. Vasmer, R. R. (1925). "Васьковский клад" [Vaskovsky Hoard] (PDF). East. Journal of Literature, Science and Art (5). Moscow — Leningrad: World Literature: 273–274.
4. Vasmer, R. (1925). "Beiträge zur muhammedanischen Münzkunde. I. Die Münzen der Abū Dā'udiden. II. Über die Münzen der Wolga-Bulgaren" [Contributions to Muhammadan Numismatics. I. The Coins of the Abu Da'udids. II. On the Coins of the Volga Bulgars]. Numismatische Zeitschrift. 58 (= New Series, 18). Vienna: 49–62, 63–84.
5. Vasmer, R. (1925). "Der kufische Münzfund von Friedrichshof in Estland" [The Kufic Coin Find from Friedrichshof in Estonia] (PDF). Proceedings of the Learned Estonian Society in Dorpat. Dorpat: 26–118.
  - Zambaur, E. (1929). "[Rez.]" [[Review]]. Numismatische Zeitschrift (in German). New Series 22=62: 151.
6. Fasmer, R. R. (1925). "Клад куфических монет, найденный в Новгороде в 1920 году" [Hoard of Kufic Coins Found in Novgorod in 1920]. Proceedings of the Russian Academy of History of Material Culture. 4: 242–276, 2 ill.
  - Zambaur, E. (1928). "[Rez.]" [[Review]]. Numismatische Zeitschrift (in German). New Series 21=61: 123.
7. Fasmer, R. R. (1925). "Хронология наместников Армении при первых Аббасидах" [Chronology of the Governors of Armenia under the First Abbasids] (PDF). Notes of the College of Orientalists at the Asian Museum of the USSR Academy of Sciences. I. Leningrad: RAN, Glavnauka, Gosizdat: 381–400.
8. Vasmer, R. (1926). "Beiträge zu Der Chalifenmünzfund von Kochtel von W. Anderson" [Contributions to The Caliph Coin Find from Kochtel by W. Anderson] (PDF). Acta et commentationes Universitatis Dorpatensis: B, Humaniora. 7: 1–149, ill. [Vasmer's additions are throughout the article and marked with initials R. V.]
  - J. A. (1927). "Review of Der Chalifenmünzfund von Kochtel (Acta Universitatis Dorpatensis B. VII. 2)". The Numismatic Chronicle and Journal of the Royal Numismatic Society. 7 (27): 294–296. ISSN 0267-7504. JSTOR 42664227.
9. Fasmer, R. (1926). "О двух золотоордынских монетах" [On Two Golden Horde Coins] (PDF). Notes of the College of Orientalists at the Asian Museum of the USSR Academy of Sciences. II. Leningrad: USSR Academy of Sciences Publishing House: 109–112, ill.
10. Fasmer, R. R. (1926). "О монетах волжских болгар X века" [On the Coins of the Volga Bulgars of the 10th Century] (PDF). Proceedings of the Society of Archaeology, History and Ethnography at Kazan University Named After V. I. Lenin. XXXIII (1). Kazan: East Typography: 29–60, ill.
  - Zambaur, E. (1928). "[Rez.]" [[Review]]. Numismatische Zeitschrift (in German). New Series 21=61: 123–124.
11. Fasmer, R. R. (1926). "Персидские монеты с надчеканкой Петра I" [Persian Coins with Countermark of Peter I]. State Hermitage: Collection (3). Leningrad: 119–132, ill.
  - Zambaur, E. (1928). "[Rez.]" [[Review]]. Numismatische Zeitschrift (in German). New Series 21=61: 123.
12. Fasmer, R. R. (1926). "Список монетных находок, зарегистрированных Секцией нумизматики и глиптики АИМК в 1920—1925 годах" [List of Coin Finds Registered by the Numismatics and Glyptics Section of the AIMK in 1920—1925]. Communications of the State Academy of History of Material Culture. I: 287–308.
13. Vasmer, R. (1926). "Der Münzfund von Kloodi Manor" [The Coin Find from Kloodi Manor]. Contributions to the Knowledge of Estonia, Livonia, and Courland. XII (4–5). Reval: 65–100. [Description of Western European coins made by N. P. Bauer]
  - Zambaur, E. (1928). "[Rez.]" [[Review]]. Numismatische Zeitschrift (in German). New Series 21=61: 125–126.
14. Vasmer, R. (1927). "Chronologie der Statthalter von Armenien unter der Halifen al-Amīn und al-Ma'mūn" [Chronology of the Governors of Armenia under the Caliphs al-Amin and al-Ma'mun]. Handes Amsorya (Monthly Review) (in German). 40. Vienna: 866–880.
  - Zambaur, E. (1929). "[Rez.]" [[Review]]. Numismatische Zeitschrift (in German). New Series 22=62: 150.
15. Vasmer, R. (1927). "Die Eroberung Ṭabaristāns durch die Araber zur Zeit des Chalifen al-Manṣūr" [The Conquest of Tabaristan by the Arabs at the Time of the Caliph al-Mansur]. Islamica (in German). III, fascicle 1: 86–150.
16. Vasmer, R. (1927). "Die Sāsānidenmünzen der Gelehrten Estnischen Gesellschaft" [The Sasanian Coins of the Learned Estonian Society] (PDF). Proceedings of the Learned Estonian Society in Dorpat (in German): 276–286.
  - Zambaur, E. (1929). "[Rez.]" [[Review]]. Numismatische Zeitschrift (in German). New Series 22=62: 149.
17. Vasmer, R. (1927). "Zur Chronologie des Ǧastāniden und Sallāriden" [On the Chronology of the Justanids and Sallarids]. Islamica (in German). III, fascicle 2: 165–186.
  - Zambaur, E. (1929). "[Rez.]" [[Review]]. Numismatische Zeitschrift (in German). New Series 22=62: 150.
18. Vasmer, R. (1927). "Zur Geschichte und Münzkunde von 'Omān im X. Jahrhundert" [On the History and Numismatics of Oman in the 10th Century] (PDF). Zeitschrift für Numismatik (Journal for Numismatics) (in German). XXXVII: 274–287.
19. Fasmer, R. R. (1927). "О двух редких золотых монетах делийских султанов" [On Two Rare Gold Coins of the Delhi Sultans]. Proceedings of the Society of Archaeology, History and Ethnography at Kazan University Named After V. I. Ulyanov-Lenin. XXXIII (4): 45–5.
20. Fasmer, R. R. (1927). "О двух редких золотых монетах делийских султанов" [On Two Rare Gold Coins of the Delhi Sultans]. Proceedings of the Society of Archaeology, History and Ethnography at Kazan University Named After V. I. Ulyanov-Lenin. XXXIII (4): 45–52.
21. Vasmer, R. R. (1927). "О монетах саджидов" [On the Coins of the Sajids]. Proceedings of the Society for the Survey and Study of Azerbaijan. V. Baku: 22–51. [Summary in German]
  - Zambaur, E. (1929). "[Rez.]" [[Review]]. Numismatische Zeitschrift (in German). New Series 22=62: 150.
22. Anderson, W.; Vasmer, R. (1928). "Elf weitere Dirhems aus dem Chalifenmünzfunde von Kochtel" [Eleven More Dirhams from the Caliph Coin Find from Kochtel] (PDF). Proceedings of the Learned Estonian Society in Dorpat (in German): 89–95.
23. Vasmer, R. (1928). "Nachtrag zu Islamica III, S. 165—186" [Addendum to Islamica III, pp. 165—186]. Islamica (in German). III, fascicle 4. Leipzig: 482–485.
24. Vasmer, R. (1928). "Sasanian coins in the Ermitage". Numismatic Chronicle. Series 5. VIII (31/32): 249–334. JSTOR 42664166.
  - Zambaur, E. (1929). "[Rez.]" [[Review]]. Numismatische Zeitschrift (in German). New Series 22=62: 149–150.
25. Vasmer, R. (1928). "Über dreizehn in Privatbesitz vorbliebene Münzen des Friedrichshofer Fundes" [On Thirteen Coins from the Friedrichshof Find Remaining in Private Ownership] (PDF). Proceedings of the Learned Estonian Society in Dorpat (in German): 84–88.
26. Fasmer, R. R. (1929). "Список монетных находок, II" [List of Coin Finds, II]. Communications of the State Academy of History of Material Culture. 2. Leningrad: 281–324.
27. Articles on Oriental Numismatics (in German) in Wörterbuch der Münzkunde [Dictionary of Numismatics]. Berlin, Leipzig: Walter de Gruyter. 1930.
  - 2nd, unchanged ed. Berlin: de Gruyter, 1970.
28. Vasmer, R. (1930). "Über die Münzen der Ṣaffāriden und ihrer Gegner in Fārs und Ḫurāsān" [On the Coins of the Saffarids and Their Opponents in Fars and Khurasan]. Numismatische Zeitschrift (in German). LXIII (= New Series XXIII). Vienna: 131–162.
29. Vasmer, R. (1930). "Zur Goldmünze Sapors II. von Persien" [On the Gold Coin of Shapur II of Persia]. Berliner Münzblätter (in German). New Series X (325): 9.
30. Vasmer, R. (1930). "Zur Münzkunde der Qarāḫāniden" [On the Numismatics of the Qarakhanids]. Communications of the Seminar for Oriental Languages in Berlin. Second Department: West Asian Studies (in German). XXXIII. Berlin: 83–104, 4 plates.
31. Vasmer, R. R. (1930). "К нумизматике халифов" [On the Numismatics of the Caliphs] (PDF). Notes of the College of Orientalists at the Asian Museum of the USSR Academy of Sciences. V: 451–480.
32. Vasmer, R. (1931). "The coins of Māzandarān". The Encyclopædia of Islam. English edition. III: 429. doi:10.1163/2214-871X_ei1_COM_0157. [s. v. Māzandarān]
  - Vasmer, R. (1936). "Die Münzen von Māzandarān" [The Coins of Mazandaran]. Enzyklopaedie des Islām: Geographical, Ethnographical and Biographical Dictionary of the Muhammadan Peoples (in German). III: L—R. Leiden, Leipzig: Brill, O. Harrassowitz: 498–499.
  - Bosworth, C. E.; Vasmer, R. (1991). "The coins of Māzandarān". Encyclopaedia of Islam. Second Edition. VI: Mahk—Mid. Leiden: E. J. Brill: 939–942. doi:10.1163/1573-3912_islam_COM_0722.
33. Fasmer, R. R. (1933). "Об издании новой топографии находок куфических монет в Восточной Европе" [On the Publication of a New Topography of Kufic Coin Finds in Eastern Europe]. Proceedings of the USSR Academy of Sciences: Series VII, Department of Social Sciences (6–7). Leningrad: 473–484.
  - Bauer, N. (1935). "[Rez.]" [[Review]]. Numismatisches Literatur-Blatt. XXVI, 52nd year, no. 344/345: 2818–2819.
34. Vasmer, R. (1933). "Zur Münzkunde der Sasaniden" [On the Numismatics of the Sasanians]. Numismatik: International Monthly (in German). Munich: 109–115.
35. Vasmer, R. (1934). "Zur Münzkunde der Persischen Schahe" [On the Numismatics of the Persian Shahs]. Islamica (in German). VI, h. 2. Leipzig: 137–181.
36. Vasmer, R. R. (1935). "Zur Münzkunde von Baktrien im 3. Jahrhundert n. Chr" [On the Numismatics of Bactria in the 3rd Century AD] (PDF). Zeitschrift für Numismatik (in German). XLII. Berlin: 24–58.
37. Vasmer, R. (1936). "Ein neuer Münzfund des elften Jahrhundert in estnischem Privatbesitz" [A New Coin Find of the Eleventh Century in Estonian Private Ownership]. Proceedings of the Learned Estonian Society. 1934 (in German). Tartu: 155–233.

== Bibliography ==
- Ivanov, Anatoliy Alekseevich (1999). Yarshater, Ehsan (ed.). Fasmer (Vasmer), Richard Richardovich. Vol. IX, fascicle 4. London: Encyclopædia Iranica. pp. 392–394. ISSN 2330-4804.
- Kravtsov, Konstantin V. (2013). Arjomand, Saïd Amir (ed.). "R. R. Vasmer and His Hand-written Catalogue of Tabarestān drachms". Journal of Persianate Studies. 6 (1–2). Leiden: BRILL: 143–152. doi:10.1163/18747167-12341254.
- Ashnin, Fyodor Dmitrievich; Alpatov, Vladimir Mikhailovich (1994). Tolstoy, Nikita Ilyich (ed.). «Дело славистов». 30-е годы [The "Slavists' Case". The 1930s]. Moscow: Nasledie. pp. 41–45, 138, 204–206, 240–242, 262. ISBN 5-201-13215-4.
- Blagovo, Nikita Vladimirovich (2006). Kubitskaya, Olga Alexandrovna; Vardenburg, Natalya Arnoldovna (eds.). Фасмер (Vasmer) Георгий (Рихард) Рихардович (Ричард Ричардович, Роман Романович) [Fasmer (Vasmer) Georgiy (Richard) Richardovich (Richard Richardovich, Roman Romanovich)]. Vol. 3: П–Я. Moscow: Public Academy of Sciences of Russian Germans. pp. 629–630. ISBN 5-93227-002-0.
- Bykov, Alexey Andreevich (1968). Artsikhovsky, Artemiy Vladimirovich (ed.). Р. Р. Фасмер (1888—1938) [R. R. Fasmer (1888–1938)] (PDF). Moscow: Nauka. pp. 105–106.
- Valiev, Murat Timurovich (2012). Shrader, Tatyana Alekseevna (ed.). Макс и Рихард Фасмеры — время и судьбы [Max and Richard Fasmers — Time and Fates] (PDF). St. Petersburg: Президентская библиотека. pp. 291–303. ISBN 978-5-88431-208-1.
- Valiev, Murat Timurovich (2015). Sakharov, Igor Vasilyevich; Belova, S. S. (eds.). Братья Фасмеры [The Fasmer Brothers] (PDF). St. Petersburg: Presidential Library. pp. 113–126. ISBN 978-5-905273-44-5.
- Marishkina, Valentina Fyodorovna (2004). Kachalina, G. I.; Marishkina, V. F.; Yakovleva, E. M. (eds.). Фасмер Ричард Ричардович (Роман Романович) [Fasmer Richard Richardovich (Roman Romanovich)]. St. Petersburg: State Hermitage. pp. 155–157. ISBN 5-93572-114-7.
- Sverdlov, Mikhail Borisovich (1973). Braginsky, Iosif Samuilovich (ed.). Р. Р. Фасмер — исследователь восточной нумизматики [R. R. Fasmer — Researcher of Eastern Numismatics]. Moscow: Народы Азии и Африки. pp. 216–218.
- Vasilkov, Yaroslav Vladimirovich; Sorokina, Marina Yuryevna (2003). Фасмер Ричард Ричардович (Роман Романович) [Fasmer Richard Richardovich (Roman Romanovich)]. St. Petersburg: Petersburg Oriental Studies. pp. 386–387.
