= Loyno (rural locality) =

Loyno (Russian: Лойно) is the name of several rural localities in Russia:

- Loyno, Kirov Oblast, a selo in Loynsky Rural Okrug of Verkhnekamsky District of Kirov Oblast, 59°43′43″N 52°38′38″E
- Loyno, Pskov Oblast, a village in Sebezhsky District of Pskov Oblast, 56°17′31″N 28°58′46″E
