= Nina Averina =

Russian bibliolographer, journalist, local historian and poet

Nina Federova Averina Нина Фёдоровна Аверина
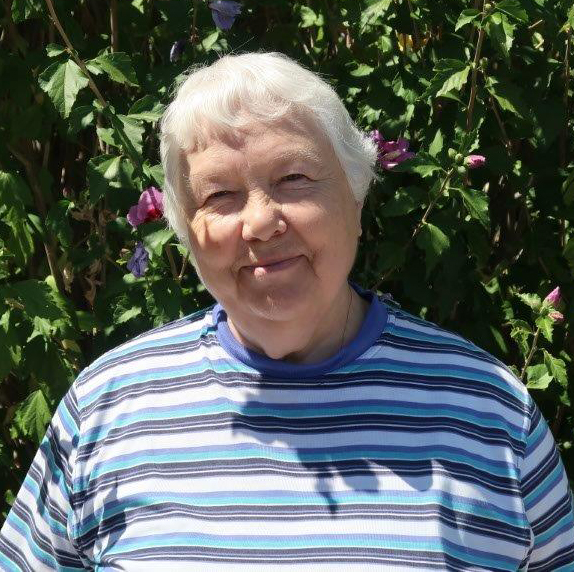
- Born: 17 June 1935 (age 90); Ilyinsky, Perm Krai, Soviet Union

Nina Federova Averina (Russian: Нина Фёдоровна Аверина) is a Soviet, Russian bibliolographer, journalist, local historian and poet. She holds Australian citizenship.

The author of more than 80 various publications on the history of publishing in Perm and the Urals and the history of Perm. She recreated the full repertoire of books published in Perm for two centuries: from 1792 to 1989 (over 16 thousand titles), which became a significant contribution to the repertoire of Russian literature. Her work "History of the Perm Book" is actively used by Russian scientists, specialists of regional libraries.

She is a Laureate of the competition of journalistic skill named after Arkady Gaidar.

== Biography ==
Averina was born in Ilyinsky, Perm (at that time – Sverdlovsk Oblast) area. She became a teacher of Russian language and literature at the full-time department of the History and Philology Faculty of Perm State University. After graduating in 1959, she worked in the Красный Север newspaper in Salekhard, and Fighting Way (Alexandrovsk city), as well as for Omsk regional radio. In 1961 she became a member of the Soviet Union of Journalists.

Returning to Perm, Averina worked as the executive secretary of the Perm University newspaper from 1964 to 1966. From 1966 to 1976 she was in charge of the reading rooms of the A. S. Puschkin Central City Library. During this period, the range of her scientific interests was made up of regional studies, the history of librarianship and the Permian period of Alexander Herzen's life.

In 1971, Averina graduated from the correspondence department in the Leningrad State Institute of Culture(LSIC), having received the qualification "Librarian-bibliographer".She was regularly published in local newspapers, in popular collections of the Perm book publishing house, such as Comrade student, Young man, Contemporarie, and Knyazhenik.

In September 1976, she moved to the Perm Institute of Culture as a senior laboratory assistant in the library science and bibliography department with the right to lecture. Soon she began to manage the student scientific circle on the history of books and led it for almost the institute. In her time at the Institute she published 53 works.

In absentia she studied at the post-graduate school of the LSIC at the department of bibliology. In 1982 she defended her thesis for the degree of candidate of philological sciences on the topic: "Democratic book business of the Perm province of the period of the raznochin movement (Problems of book publishing, distribution, reading)", in 1985 she received the title of associate professor. In 1996, due to family circumstances, she was forced to retire, and in 2003 she moved to Adelaide, Australia.

== Awards and titles ==
- Laureate of the A. Gaidar Journalism Competition.
- Laureate of the All-Russian competition for the best work on bibliology.
- Winner of the competition of the Perm publishing house "Our Author".
