= Inva =

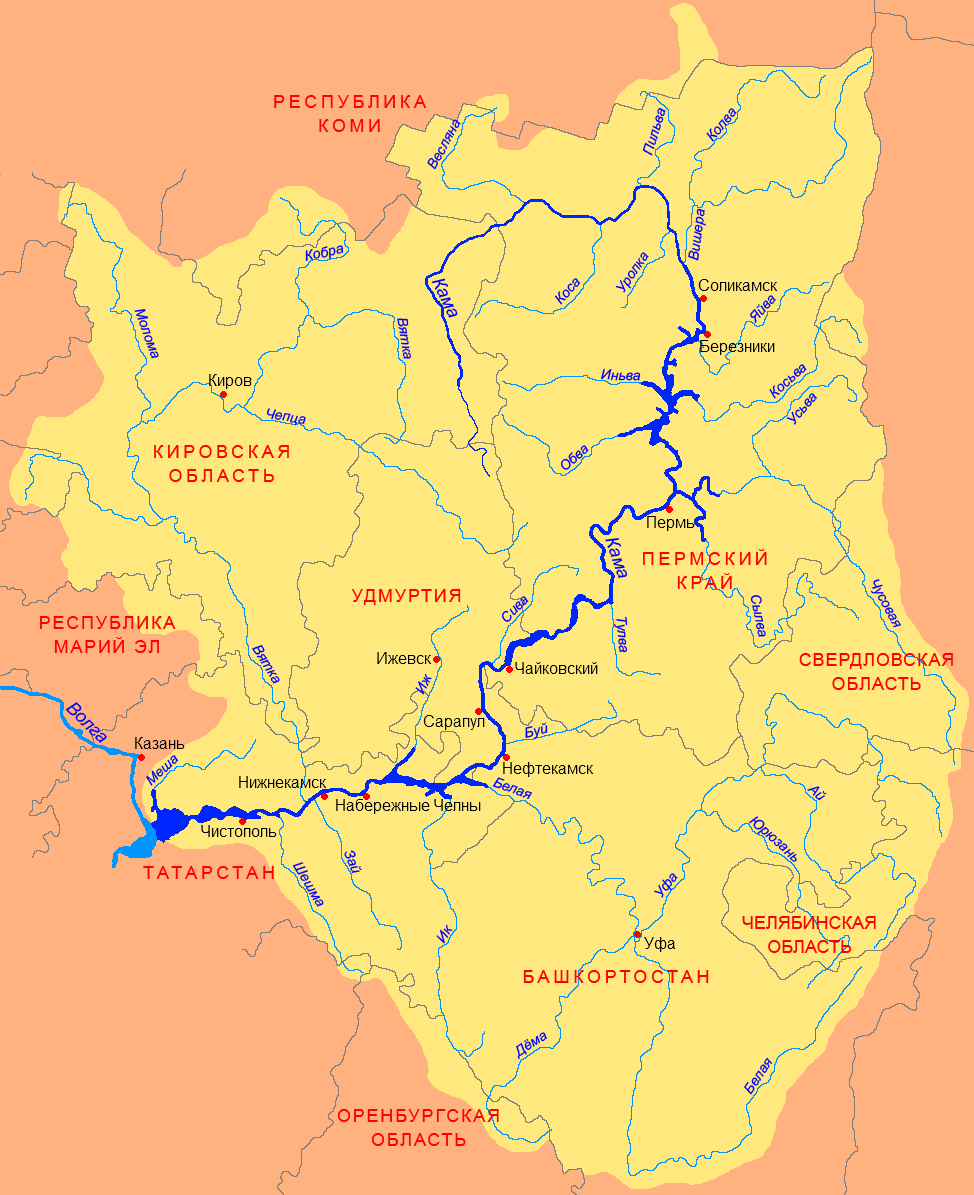
- Scheme of the Kama River Basin.

Location
- Country: Russia

Physical characteristics
- Source
  - location: Upper Kama Upland
- Mouth
  - location: Kama
  - coordinates: 58°59′54″N 55°52′13″E
- Length: 257 km (160 mi)
- Basin size: 5,920 km^{2} (2,290 sq mi)

Basin features
- Progression: Kama→ Volga→ Caspian Sea

The Inva (Russian: Иньва) is a river in Perm Krai, Russia, a right tributary of the river Kama. It begins in the Upper Kama Upland near the border of Kirov oblast then flows through Komi-Permyak Okrug and into Kama Reservoir, forming Invensky Bay. The main tributaries are Velva and Kuva (left), Yusva (right).

The river is 257 kilometres (160 mi) long with a drainage basin of 5,920 square kilometres (2,290 mi^{2}). It is frozen from early November to late April. The town of Kudymkar is along the Inva River.

== Etymology ==
The name of the river is formed from the Komi-Permyak words “инь” (woman) and “ва” (water), which can be translated as “female water”.
