= 5 km, Perm Krai =

5 kilometr 5 км
- Settlement
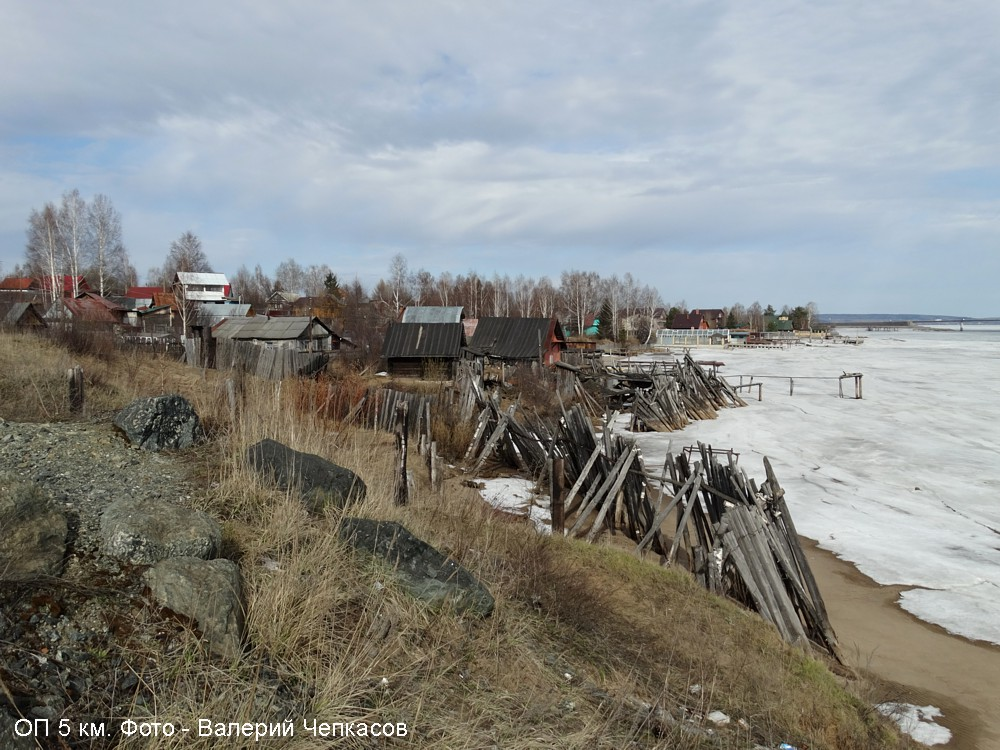

- Location within Perm Krai Location within Russia
- Coordinates: 58.170833°N 56.384722°E
- Country: Russia
- Region: Perm Krai
- District: Dobryansky District
- Time zone: [[UTC+05:00]]

5 kilometr (Russian: 5 км) is a rural locality (a settlement) in Krasnosludskoye Rural Settlement of Dobryansky District, Perm Krai, Russia.

The population was 328 as of 2010; 361 (91% of Russians) as of 2002.

== Geography ==
The settlement is located on the shore of the Chusov Bay of Kama Reservoir.

Perm — Ugleuralskaya section of the Sverdlovsk Railway passes through the settlement, on which the Posyolok Pyatyy Kilometr (until January 2022 — 5 km) train stop is located here.

To the south of the settlement there is a railway bridge over the Chusovaya River. The city Perm is located on the opposite shore of the Chusov Bay.

== Streets ==
- 2nd Rechnaya
- Bolnichnyy gorodok
- Dachnaya
- Dorozhnaya
- Zarechnaya
- Lugovaya
- Naberezhnaya
- Nagornaya
- Pesochnaya
- Pribrezhnaya
- Pribrezhnyy snt
- Rechnaya
- Solnechnaya
- Tsentralnaya
