= Sergei Teploukhov =

Russian and Soviet archaeologist (1880–1934)

- Сергей Теплоухов
- Born: 3 March 1888; Ilyinsky, Russian Empire
- Died: 10 March 1934 (aged 46); Leningrad, Soviet Union
- Citizenship: Russian, Soviet
- Education: Imperial Kazan University
- Occupation: Archeologist
- Employer(s): Tomsk State University; Saint Petersburg Imperial University
- Known for: Archaeological culture, Slavists case

Sergei Aleksandrovich Teploukhov (Russian: Серге́й Алекса́ндрович Теплоу́хов; March 3, 1888 – March 10, 1934) was an archaeologist from the Soviet Union. From 1920 to 1932, Teploukhov conducted research on the archaeological remains of various periods in Siberia and Central Asia. He was the first to devise a classification of the archaeological cultures of Southern Siberia.

== Biography ==
Sergei Teploukhov came from a family, many of whose representatives were seriously involved in science. His grandfather Aleksandr Teploukhov was a serf of the Stroganov family, but was educated in Saint Petersburg and Dresden. He served for many years in the Perm possessions of the Stroganovs, and after retiring, he took up archeology: He most fully excavated the Garevskoye and Ilyinskoye bones. He also studied the past of the Finno-Ugric population of the Urals. He was a member of many Russian and foreign scientific societies.

Teploukhov was fond of ornithology as a child and, under the guidance of his uncle, Fyodor Alexandrovich, collected unique material. In 1907, he graduated from the Perm Real School and entered Kazan University, in the natural sciences department of the Faculty of Physics and Mathematics. During his student years he studied ornithology and paleontology. At the same time he became interested in anthropology, ethnography and archaeology. He graduated in 1912. After receiving a zoological specialty, Teploukhov chose a second specialty - anthropology and worked at the Department of Geography. In order to test the hypothesis about the Sayan-Altai ancestral home of the Finns, in 1913 he was sent to the Uryankhay Krai.

In 1919-1929 Teploukhov was an associate professor and professor at Tomsk State University in the department of geography and anthropology. In 1920, he headed the archaeological detachment of the geographical expedition of Tomsk University and began many years of archaeological research, the task of which was to create a classification of archaeological monuments of the Minusinsk Basin. For this purpose, Teploukhov in 1920-1929 carried out systematic excavations of various burial grounds in the vicinity of the village Bateni (modern Bogradsky District of Khakassia).

Based on the material collected in the Minusinsk Basin, Teploukhov created a classification system of archaeological cultures of the basin, published in its final form in 1929, and basically retaining its scientific significance to this day. T. based the classification of archaeological monuments he created on changes in burial structures, funeral equipment, and funeral rites. He identified the characteristic features of each archaeological culture that existed in this microdistrict (Afanasyevskaya, Andronovo, Karasukskaya, Tagarskaya). Teploukhov discovered the Andronovo culture (in the village of Andronovka, Uzhursky District), belonging to the Bronze Age. He correctly determined that the Minusinsk region is the periphery of the Andronovo culture: in subsequent years it was discovered that the Andronovo people lived on a vast territory, including the Southern Urals, Northern Kazakhstan, and Western Siberia. Now it is more correct to talk about the Andronovo archaeological community, consisting of a number of cultures.

In the early 1930s, when archeology was declared a bourgeois science, repressions against archaeologists began. On November 26, 1933, Teploukhov was arrested in connection with the Russian National Party case (the Slavists case). In the case of this conspiration invented by the security officers, many Moscow and Leningrad scientists were repressed: philologists, archaeologists, ethnographers, art historians, chemists and geologists. During the investigation, Teploukhov was forced to plead guilty, and on March 10, 1934, he hanged himself in his cell. He was rehabilitated on May 27, 1958 for lack of evidence of a crime.
