= Kuliga =

Kuliga Кулига
- Village
- Location within Arkhangelsk Oblast Location within Russia
- Coordinates: 62°45′N 43°14′E
- Country: Russia
- Region: Arkhangelsk Oblast
- District: Vinogradovsky District
- Time zone: UTC+3:00

Kuliga (Russian: Кулига) is a rural locality (a village) in Osinovskoye Rural Settlement of Vinogradovsky District, Arkhangelsk Oblast, Russia. The population was 10 as of 2010.

== Geography ==
Kuliga is located 32 km southeast of Bereznik (the district's administrative centre) by road. Konetsgorye is the nearest rural locality.
