= Obva =

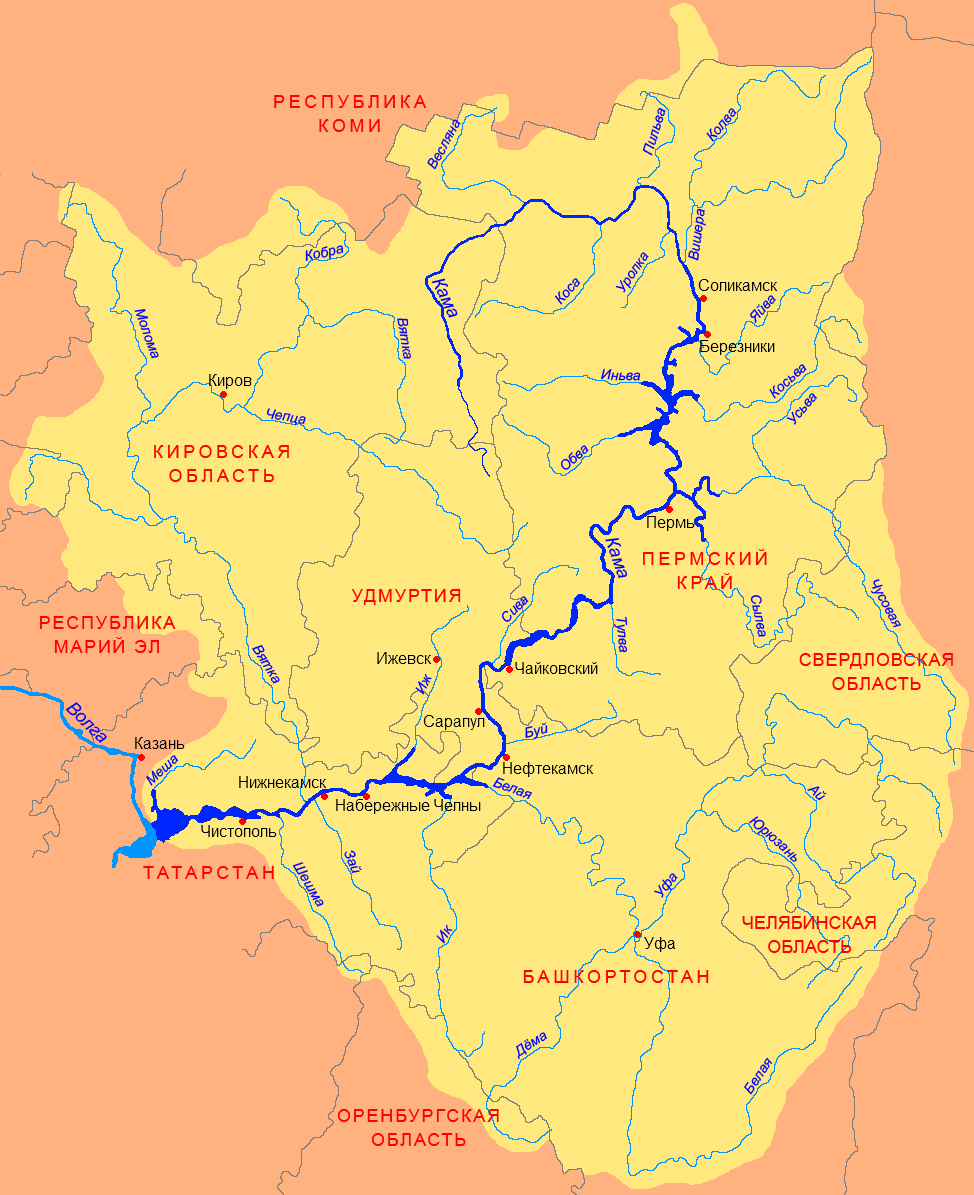
- Scheme of the Kama River Basin.

Location
- Country: Russia

Physical characteristics
- Source
  - location: Upper Kama Upland
- Mouth
  - location: Kama
  - coordinates: 58°32′20″N 55°27′06″E
- Length: 247 km (153 mi)
- Basin size: 6,720 km^{2} (2,590 sq mi)

Basin features
- Progression: Kama→ Volga→ Caspian Sea

The Obva (Russian: Обва) – is a river in Perm Krai, Russia, a right tributary of the Kama. It starts in the Upper Kama Upland, in the west part of Sivinsky District, near the border of Kirov oblast. It flows into Kama Reservoir, 780 kilometres (480 mi) from the confluence of the Kama and the Volga. It is 247 kilometres (153 mi) long, and its drainage basin covers 6,720 square kilometres (2,590 mi^{2}). The Obva is frozen from late October to late April or early May.
