= Kama (river) =

River in Russia; Volga tributary

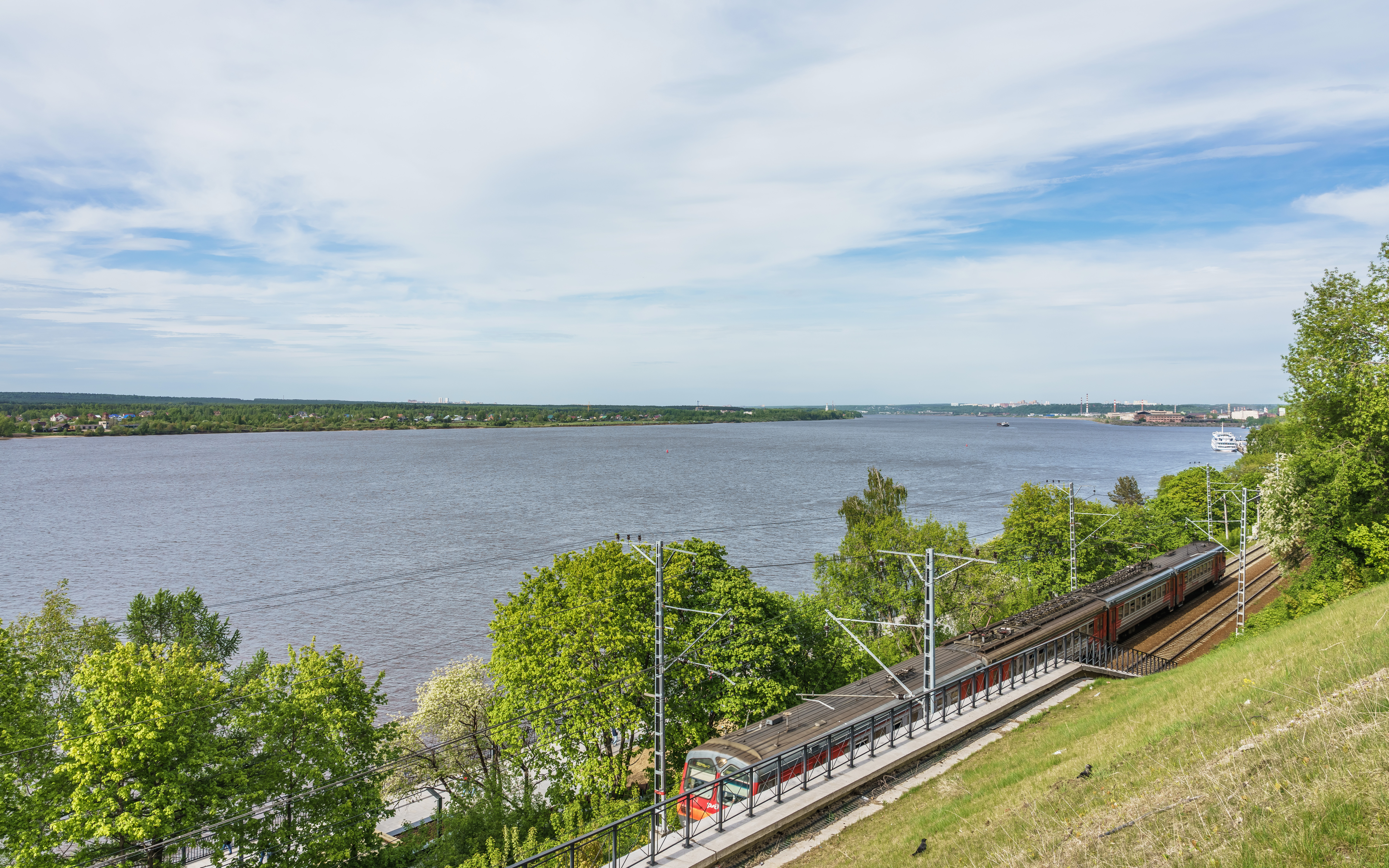
- The Kama River in the city of Perm

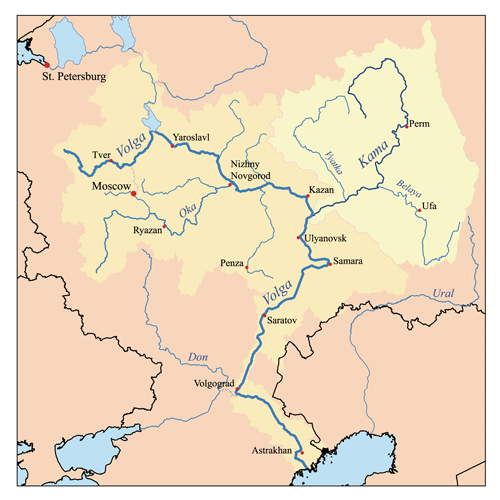
- Map of the Volga's watershed with the Kama's watershed highlighted
- Native name: Кама (Russian)

Location
- Country: Russia

Physical characteristics
- Source: Kama (river)
  - location: Kuliga, Udmurtia
  - coordinates: 58°11′20″N 53°45′00″E
  - elevation: 360 m (1,180 ft)
- Mouth: Volga River
  - location: Kuybyshev Reservoir, Tatarstan
  - coordinates: 55°21′50″N 49°59′52″E
  - elevation: 45 m (148 ft)
- Length: 1,805 km (1,122 mi)
- Basin size: 507,000 km^{2} (196,000 mi^{2})
- Discharge
  - average: 4,100 m^{3}/s (140,000 cu ft/s); 4,320 m^{3}/s (153,000 cu ft/s)

Basin features
- Progression: Volga→ Caspian Sea

The Kama (UK: /ˈkæmə/ KA-mə, US: /ˈkɑːmə/ KAH-mə; Russian: Кама [ˈkamə]; Udmurt: Кам), also known as the Chulman (/tʃuːlˈmɑːn/ chool-MAHN; Tatar: Чулман [tɕuɫˈmɑn]), is a 1,805-kilometre (1,122 mi) long river in Russia. It has a drainage basin of 507,000 square kilometres (196,000 sq mi). It is the longest left tributary of the Volga and the largest one by discharge. At their confluence, in fact, the Kama is larger in terms of discharge than the Volga.

It starts in the Udmurt Republic, near Kuliga, flowing northwest for 200 kilometres (120 mi), turning northeast near Loyno for another 200 kilometres (120 mi), then turning south and west in Perm Krai, flowing again through the Udmurt Republic and then through the Republic of Tatarstan, where it meets the Volga south of Kazan.

Before the advent of railroads, important portages connected the Kama with the basins of the Northern Dvina and the Pechora. In the early 19th century the Northern Ekaterininsky Canal connected the upper Kama with the Vychegda River (a tributary of the Northern Dvina), but was mostly abandoned after just a few years due to low use.

== Dams and reservoirs ==
The Kama is dammed at several locations:

- At Perm, by the dam of the Kama Hydroelectric Station, forming the Kama Reservoir;
- At Chaykovsky, by the dam of the Votkinsk Hydroelectric Station, forming the Votkinsk Reservoir;
- At Naberezhnye Chelny, by the dam of the Nizhnekamsk Hydroelectric Station, forming the Nizhnekamsk Reservoir.

The creation of reservoirs on the Kama River has significantly altered its native fish communities and facilitated the expansion of alien species. The proportion of invasive fish species in the Kama River reservoirs ranges from 8% in the upper reaches to 27% in the Votkinsk Reservoir. Notably, the round goby (Neogobius melanostomus) has successfully colonized the entire cascade of Volga reservoirs and has been recorded as far upstream as the upper part of the Votkinsk Reservoir on the Kama River.

== Tributaries ==
The largest tributaries of the Kama are, from source to mouth:

- Veslyana (left)
- Kosa (right)
- South Keltma (left)
- Vishera (left)
- Yayva (left)
- Inva (right)
- Kosva (left)
- Obva (right)
- Chusovaya (left)
- Tulva (left)
- Siva (right)
- Buy (left)
- Belaya (left)
- Izh (right)
- Ik (left)
- Toyma (right)
- Zay (left)
- Vyatka (right)
- Sheshma (left)
- Myosha (right)

== Gallery ==
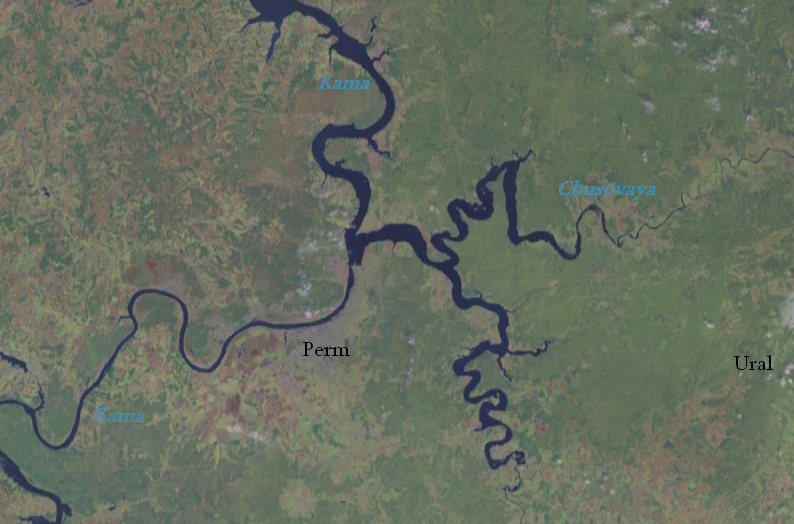
Crossing of the rivers Chusovaya (tributary) and Kama

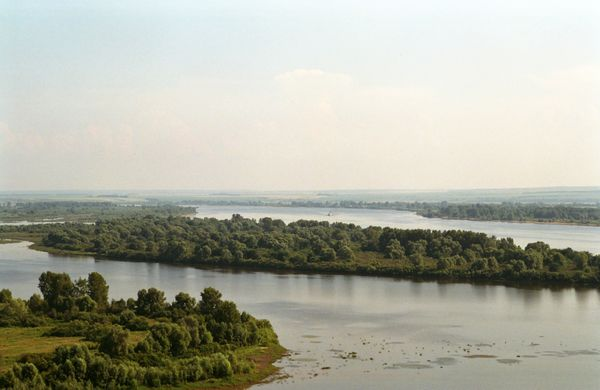
View in Yelabuga

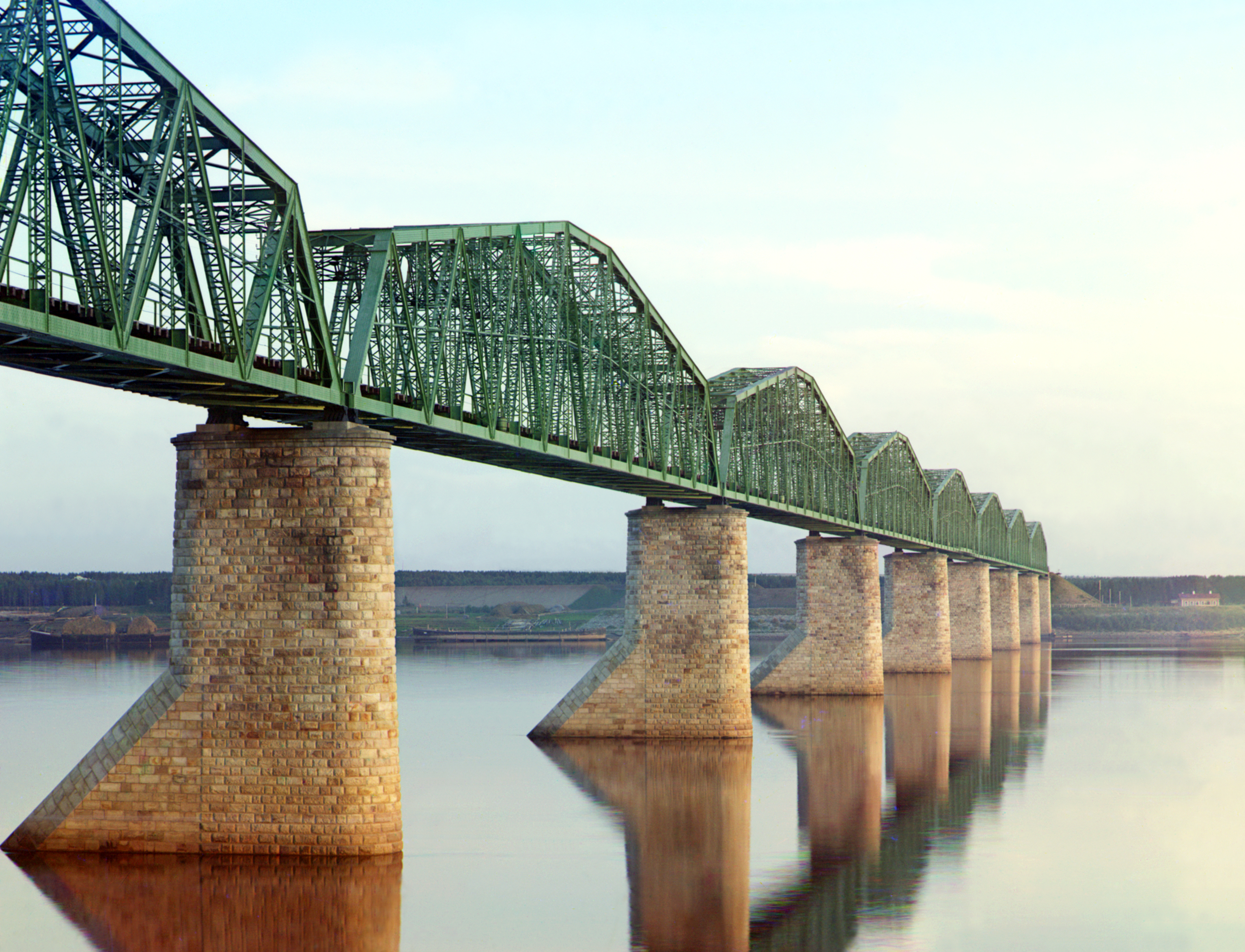
A Russian truss bridge by Lavr Proskuryakov. Early colour photograph, taken c. 1912.

== Volga or Kama ==
Even today, disputes over the primacy of the rivers continue: Volga or Kama? Scientific facts say that the Volga flows into the Kama, and not vice versa. The confluence of the Volga and the Kama has exactly the same water content (Volga: 3,500 m^{3}/s; Kama: 4,100 m^{3}/s). The source of the Volga (228 m) is below the source of the Kama (331 m), which is the main factor in determining the superiority of any river. Compared to the Kama basin (507,000 km^{2}), the Volga has a larger basin (604,000 km^{2}). More rivers flow into the Kama than the Volga. Experts have proven that the valley of the Kama River is more ancient than the Volga River valley. In other words, at the time of the existence of the ancient Kama, also known as the Paleo-Kama, there was no Volga. Later, geological changes caused the Volga to join the Kama at right angles. Also looking at the map, we can understand that the confluence of the Kama and the Volga is the continuation of the Kama canal. The bed of the Kama is lower, so the Volga clearly flows into the Kama.
