= Loyno, Kirov Oblast =

Locality in Kirov, Russia

Coordinates: 59°43′30″N 52°38′55″E

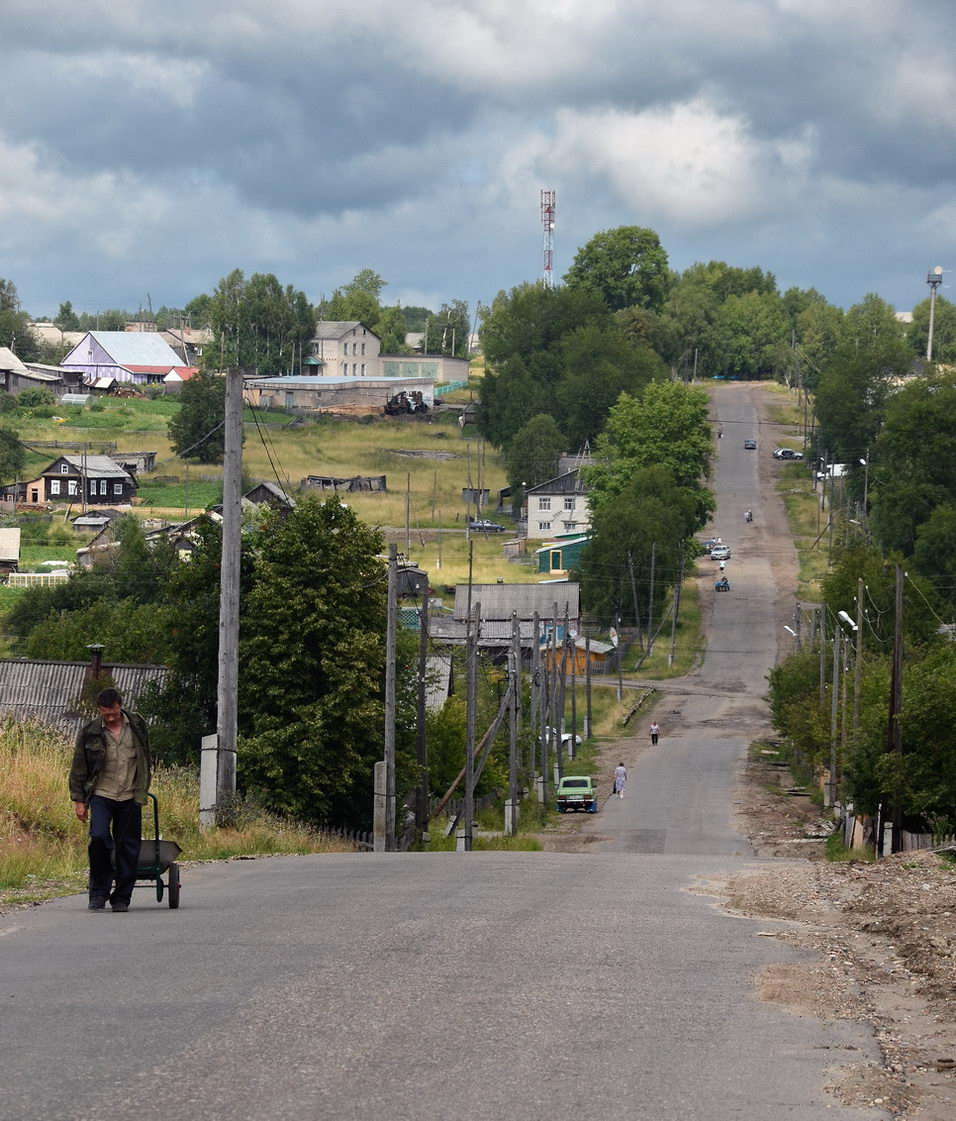
Street of Loyno, Kirov Oblast

Loyno (Russian: Ло́йно) is a rural locality (a selo) in Verkhnekamsky District of Kirov Oblast, Russia, located 240 kilometers (150 mi) northeast of Kirov along the Kama River. Postal code: 612834; dialing code: (+7) 83339.
