= Ilyinsky, Perm Krai =

Ilyinsky Ильинский
- Settlement
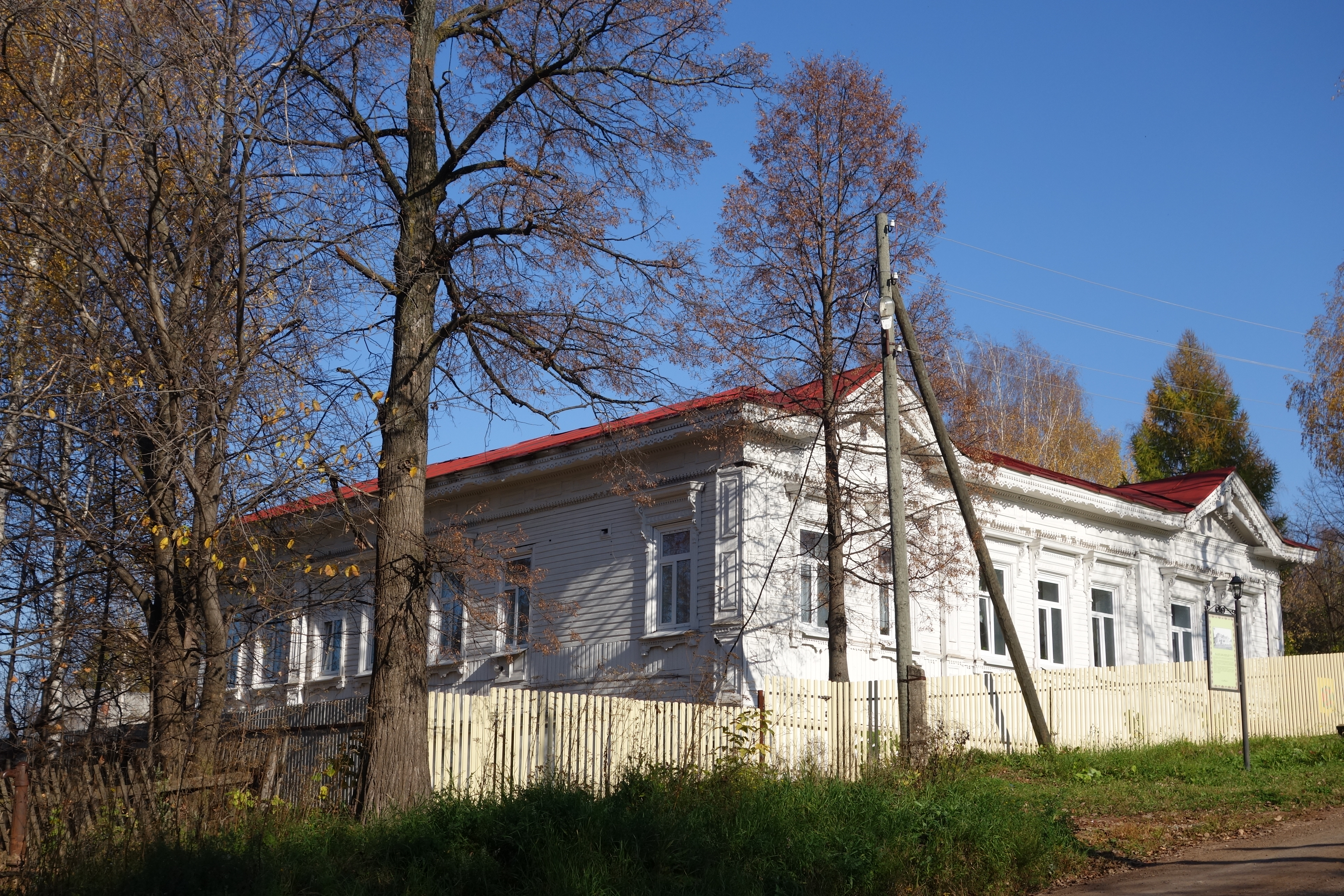

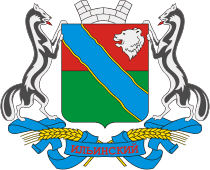
- Coat of arms
- Interactive map of Ilyinsky
- Location of Ilyinsky Ilyinsky (Perm Krai)
- Coordinates: 58°35′N 55°42′E
- Country: Russia
- Federal subject: Perm Krai
- Administrative district: Ilyinsky District
- Founded: 1579 (Julian)
- Rural locality status since: January 2012

Population (2010 Census)
  - Total: 6,288
  - Estimate (2021): 6,228 (−1%)

Administrative status
  - Capital of: Ilyinsky District
- Time zone: UTC+5 (MSK+2)
- Postal code: 617020
- OKTMO ID: 57520000101

Ilyinsky (Russian: Ильи́нский; Komi Permyak: Обва, Obva) is a rural locality (a settlement) and the administrative center of Ilyinsky District in Perm Krai, Russia, located on the banks of the Kama Reservoir. Population: 6,288 (2010 census); 6,503 (2002 census); 6,602 (1989 Soviet census).
