= Siva, Perm Krai =

Siva Сива
- Selo
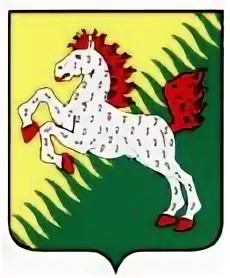
- Coat of arms
- Interactive map of Siva
- Location of Siva Siva (Perm Krai)
- Coordinates: 58°22′33″N 54°22′42″E
- Country: Russia
- Federal subject: Perm Krai
- Administrative district: Sivinsky District

Population (2010 Census)
  - Total: 4,659
  - Estimate (2021): 4,824 (+3.5%)

Administrative status
  - Capital of: Sivinsky District
- Time zone: UTC+5 (MSK+2)
- Postal code: 617240
- OKTMO ID: 57648434101

Siva (Russian: Си́ва) is a rural locality (a selo) and the administrative center of Sivinsky District of Perm Krai, Russia. Population: 4,659 (2010 census); 4,865 (2002 census); 4,888 (1989 Soviet census).
