= Sivinsky District =

Sivinsky District Сивинский район (Russian)
- District
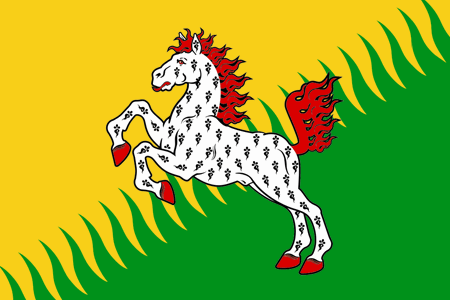
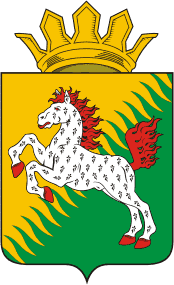
- Flag Coat of arms
- Location of Sivinsky District in Perm Krai
- Coordinates: 58.468°N 53.654°E
- Country: Russia
- Federal subject: Perm Krai
- Established: January 1924 (first), January 12, 1965 (second)
- Administrative center: Siva

Area
  - Total: 2,517 km^{2} (972 sq mi)

Population (2010 Census)
  - Total: 14,843
  - Density: 5.897/km^{2} (15.27/sq mi)
  - Urban: 0%
  - Rural: 100%

Administrative structure
  - Inhabited localities: 138 rural localities

Municipal structure
  - Municipally incorporated as: Sivinsky Municipal District
  - Municipal divisions: 0 urban settlements, 4 rural settlements
- Time zone: UTC+5 (MSK+2)
- OKTMO ID: 57548000
- Website: http://sivaperm.ru/

Sivinsky District (Russian: Си́винский райо́н) is an administrative district (raion) of Perm Krai, Russia; one of the thirty-three in the krai. Municipally, it is incorporated as Sivinsky Municipal District. It is located in the west of the krai. The area of the district is 2,517 square kilometers (972 sq mi). Its administrative center is the rural locality (a selo) of Siva. Population: 14,843 (2010 census); 17,445 (2002 census); 18,756 (1989 Soviet census). The population of Siva accounts for 31.4% of the district's total population.

== Geography ==
The highest point of the district is 303 meters (994 ft) above sea level. The Obva River flows through the district. Climate is continental with average annual temperature of +10 °C (50 °F). One-third of the territory is forested.

The district has the least favorable geographical position within the krai, because it situated far from the main economic centers.

== History ==
The district was established in January 1924. It was abolished on February 1, 1963 but restored on January 12, 1965.

== Demographics ==
Ethnic composition:

- Russians: 96.1%
- Komi-Permyak people: 1%

== Notable residents ==
- Anatoly Sidorov (born 1958), Army commander, born in Siva

== Sources ==
- Законодательное собрание Пермской области. Закон №416-67 от 28 февраля 1996 г. «Об административно-территориальном устройстве Пермского края», в ред. Закона №504-ПК от 9 июля 2015 г. «О внесении изменений в Закон Пермской области "Об административно-территориальном устройстве Пермского края"». Вступил в силу с момента опубликования. Опубликован: "Звезда", №38, 12 марта 1996 г. (Legislative Assembly of Perm Oblast. Law #416-67 of February 28, 1996 On the Administrative-Territorial Structure of Perm Krai, as amended by the Law #504-PK of July 9, 2015 On Amending the Law of Perm Oblast "On the Administrative-Territorial Structure of Perm Krai". Effective as of the moment of publication.).
- Законодательное собрание Пермской области. Закон №1740-357 от 10 ноября 2004 г. «Об утверждении границ и о наделении статусом муниципальных образований Сивинского района Пермского края», в ред. Закона №175-ПК от 7 марта 2013 г. «О внесении изменений в отдельные Законы Пермской области, Коми-Пермяцкого автономного округа об утверждении границ и о наделении статусом муниципальных образований Пермского края». Вступил в силу через десять дней со дня официального опубликования. Опубликован: "Бюллетень Законодательного Собрания и администрации Пермской области", №12, I часть, 9 декабря 2004 г. (Legislative Assembly of Perm Oblast. Law #1740-357 of November 10, 2004 On Establishing the Borders and on Granting the Status to the Municipal Formations of Sivinsky District of Perm Krai, as amended by the Law #175-PK of March 7, 2013 On Amending Various Laws of Perm Oblast, Komi-Permyak Autonomous Okrug on Establishing the Borders and on Granting the Status to the Municipal Formations of Perm Krai. Effective as of the day which is ten days following the day of the official publication.).
