= Kama Reservoir =

Russian reservoir formed by the dam of the Kama Hydroelectric Station near Perm

Kama Reservoir Perm Reservoir
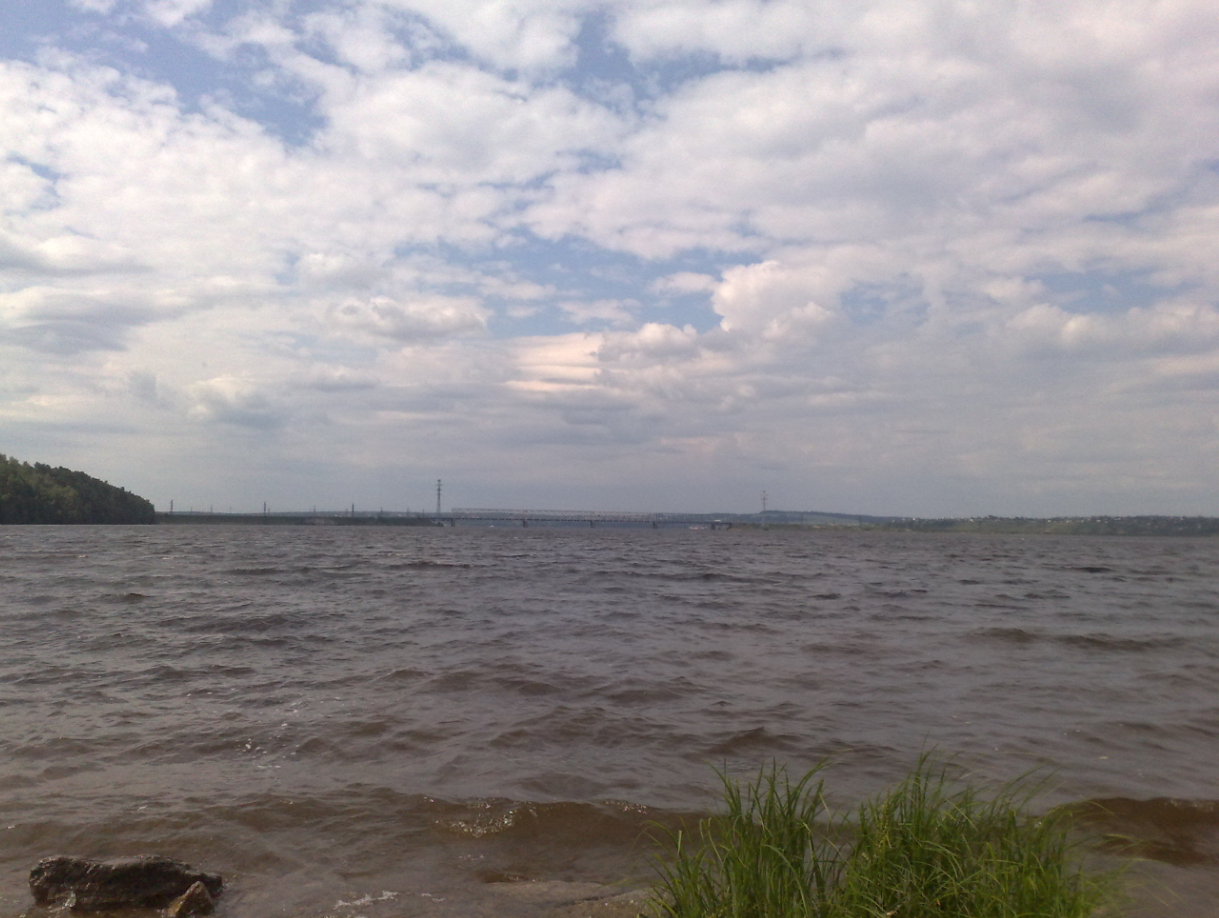
- View from the confluence area of the Chusovaya River.

- Location within Perm Krai
- Coordinates: 58°59′N 56°10′E
- Lake type: reservoir
- Primary inflows: Kama, Chusovaya, Sylva, Obva, Inva, Kosva
- Primary outflows: Kama
- Basin countries: Russia
- Max. length: 272 km (169 mi)
- Max. width: 30 km (19 mi)
- Surface area: 1,915 km^{2} (739 sq mi)
- Average depth: 6.3 m (21 ft)
- Max. depth: 30 m (98 ft)
- Water volume: 12.2 km^{3} (2.9 cu mi)
- Surface elevation: 108.5 m (356 ft)
- Settlements: Perm, Dobryanka, Chyormoz, Berezniki, Usolye, and Solikamsk

The Kama Reservoir, also known as the Perm Reservoir (Russian: Камское водохранилище, Пермское водохранилище), is a reservoir formed by the dam of the Kama Hydroelectric Station near Perm (constructed in 1954-1956). The Kama Reservoir has a surface area of 1,915 km^{2} and a water volume of 12.2 cubic km. Its length along the Kama is 272 km, major width - up to 30 km, average depth - 6.3 m (with maximum depth equaling 30 m). The Kama Reservoir was created to facilitate transportation, hydroelectric generation, and water supply. It is also used for seasonal flow regulation. The cities of Perm, Dobryanka, Chyormoz, Berezniki, Usolye, and Solikamsk are located on the shores of the Kama Reservoir.
