= Serov (town) =

Town in Sverdlovsk Oblast, Russia

Serov Серов
- Town
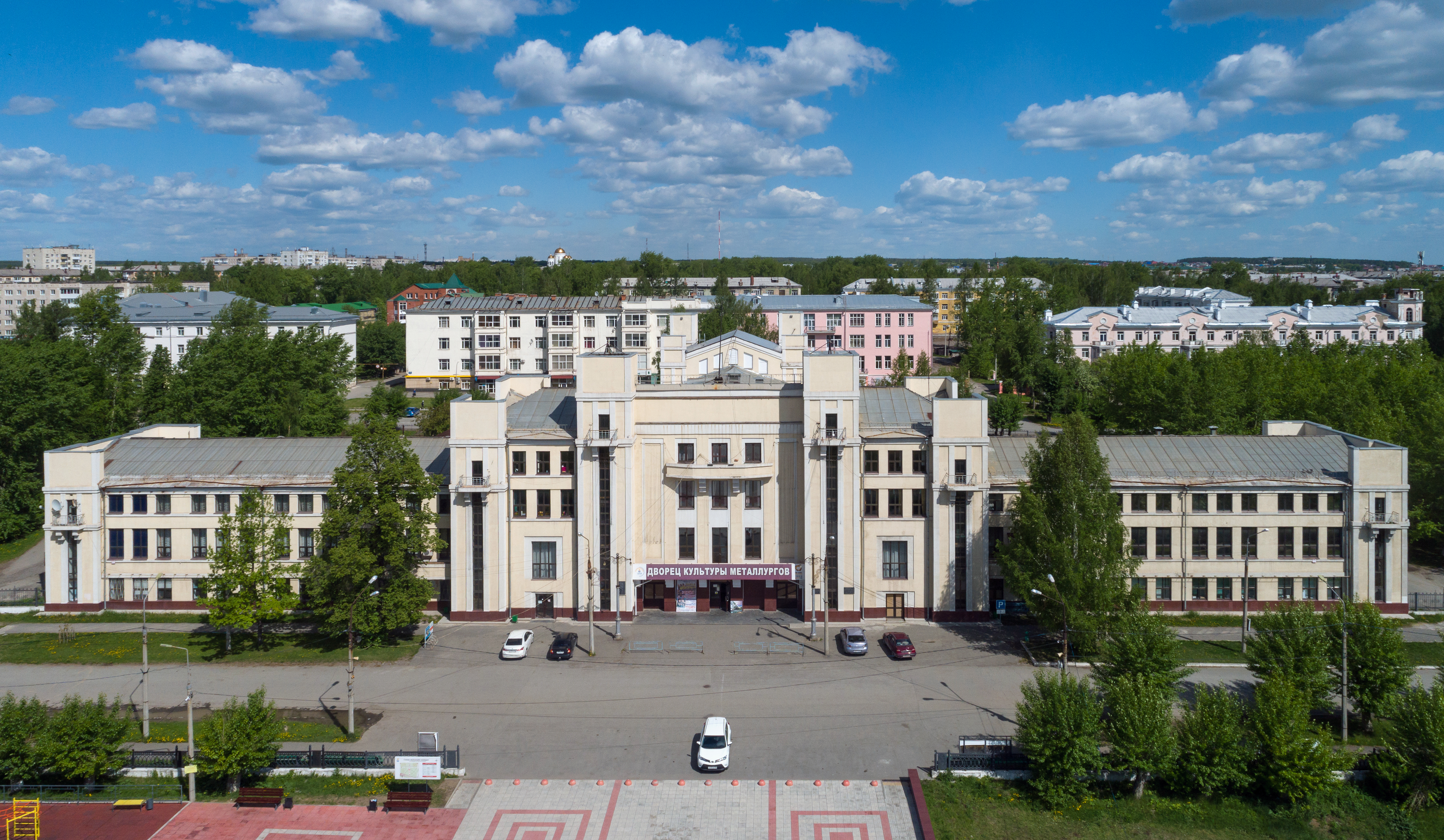
- Palace of Culture of Metallurgists

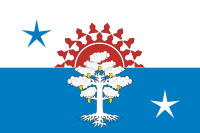
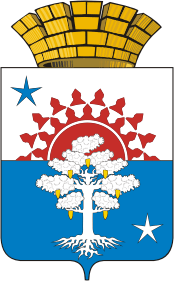
- Flag Coat of arms
- Interactive map of Serov
- Location of Serov Serov (Sverdlovsk Oblast)
- Coordinates: 59°36′N 60°34′E
- Country: Russia
- Federal subject: Sverdlovsk Oblast
- Founded: 1894
- Town status since: 1926

Government
  - Mayor: Vladimir Anisimov
- Elevation: 105 m (344 ft)

Population (2010 Census)
  - Total: 99,373
  - Estimate (2025): 91,550 (−7.9%)
  - Rank: 167th in 2010

Administrative status
  - Subordinated to: Town of Serov
  - Capital of: Serovsky District, Town of Serov

Municipal status
  - Urban okrug: Serovsky Urban Okrug
  - Capital of: Serovsky Urban Okrug
- Time zone: UTC+5 (MSK+2)
- Postal code: 624XXX
- Dialing code: +7 34385
- OKTMO ID: 65756000001
- Website: www.adm-serov.ru

Serov (Russian: Серо́в) is a mining and commercial town in Sverdlovsk Oblast, Russia, located on the eastern foothills of the Ural Mountains, on the left bank of the Kakva River (a tributary of the Sosva), about 350 kilometers (220 mi) north of Yekaterinburg. Population: 99,373 (2010 census); 99,804 (2002 census); 104,158 (1989 Soviet census).

Historical population
Year	Pop.	±%
1926	33,400	—
1939	65,000	+94.6%
1959	97,882	+50.6%
1970	100,679	+2.9%
1979	101,481	+0.8%
1989	104,158	+2.6%
2002	99,804	−4.2%
2010	99,373	−0.4%
2021	94,211	−5.2%
Source: Census data

== History ==
Archaeological evidence suggests that the Mansi or their ancestors populated the area of Serov as early as 1000 BCE. In the early days of the Russian colonization of Siberia the district had only a few minor villages. The situation changed in 1893, when the chief manager of Bogoslovsk Mining District, Alexander Auerbakh, proposed a construction of a cast iron and rail plant on the Kakva River near the end of an existing railroad. This year the construction of a workers' settlement began. It was named Nadezhdinsk after Nadezhda Polovtsova, the owner of Bogoslovsk Mining District. The first steel and rails in Nadezhdinsk were produced in 1896. Nadezhdinsk became an important supplier of rails for the Trans-Siberian Railway. Dmitry Mendeleyev, who visited Nadezhdinsk, was pleasantly surprised by the progressive technology used at the plant. The first school in Nadezhdinsk opened in December 1895, the first power plant (415 kW) in 1907.

The Revolution of 1905 affected Nadezhdinsk, with the turmoil continuing through 1908. At the beginning of World War I, Nadezhdinsk industry was reshaped to meet the demands of the military. Klein Brothers machine-building factory relocated to Nadezhdinsk from Riga in 1917. The growing demand for workforce was met by hiring workers from China and Korea, as well as prisoners of war (POWs). There were 1,266 Chinese and Koreans, and 3,329 POWs in Nadezhdinsk in 1917.

On October 27, 1917, two days after the October Revolution in Petrograd, power in the town bloodlessly transferred to the Worker's Soviet. On December 18, 1917, Bogoslovsk Mining District, including the Nadezhdinsk plants, was nationalized. In October 1918, the army of the Provisional Government of Siberia, which opposed the Soviets in the Russian Civil War, occupied Nadezhdinsk. On November 20, 1918, two days after admiral Kolchak become the head of the White government of Siberia, the "whites" in Nadezhdinsk executed twenty-three of their "red" opponents. On July 19, 1919, Red partisans, supporting the Soviets, re-took the settlement. It was devastated after the Civil War. None of the factories were working and many engineers left the area.

15 September 1919 Nadezhdinsk gained town status. The Central Executive Committee decree of 5 April 1926 Nadezhdinsk was approved within the cities of the Ural region.

The Soviet government put a lot of effort into restoring normal life and economy. By the end of 1925, Nadezhdinsk plant was running at its full capacity. Streets and house numbers were changed. A hospital, a circus, and a cabaret opened.

In the 1930s ferrous-metal production in Nadezhdinsk expanded and diversified. In 1934 the town was renamed Kabakovsk, after Ivan Dmitrievich Kabakov, the leader of the Bolshevik Party in Sverdlovsk Oblast. In 1937, Kabakov was dismissed and executed in Stalin's purges, and the town's name changed back to Nadezhdinsk. On 7 June 1939 the town was renamed Serov, after the fighter-pilot Anatoly Serov, a former Nadezhdinsk Plant worker and a hero of the Spanish Civil War, who had died on 11 May 1939.

Serov was an important center of steel production during World War II. Due to the shortage of males, who were conscripted into active service, most steel jobs were taken by women. Numerous organizations evacuated to Serov from the Soviet territories occupied by Germans: hospitals from Polotsk and Smolensk, and Lenkom Theater from Leningrad.

After the war, demand for steel increased even more due to reconstruction. Serov became a major electrified railroad center and a new power plant was built. In 1958, Serov produced its first ferrosilicon. In the 1970s a timber factory and a gas pipeline were built.

In the early 1990s the failed reforms of Mikhail Gorbachev brought the town economy to a record low level. The town saw a significant growth of unemployment and poverty, as did most other small towns in Russia. At the same time, many businesses were privatized or became municipal property.

On July 14, 1993, a dam at Kiselevskoye water reservoir broke and 1,373 families lost their houses.

Since the 2000s, the town economy has improved, the standards of living have risen, and the town appearance continues to improve. In November 2004, Serov hosted the Russian Bodybuilding and Fitness Championship.

== Administrative and municipal status ==
Within the framework of the administrative divisions, Serov serves as the administrative center of Serovsky District, even though it is not a part of it. As an administrative division, it is, together with thirty-six rural localities, incorporated separately as the Town of Serov—an administrative unit with the status equal to that of the districts. As a municipal division, the Town of Serov is incorporated as Serovsky Urban Okrug.

== Economy ==
Serov is a major center of ferrous metallurgy, which constitutes 80% of its economy. Two largest companies are A. K. Serov Metallurgical Plant and Serov Ferro-Alloys Plant. The latter produces approximately 5% of the world's ferrochromium. Other industries are machine-building, timber, food. Serov Power Plant (Serovskaya GRES) provides electricity to the area. The town is the center of a mining area, with lignite, iron, bauxite, and gold mines. Within the okrug, 10 kilometers north from Serov, the Serov nickel deposit is situated.

== Climate ==
The climate is continental, with temperate summers and cold snowy winters.

== Notable people ==
- Anton Bakov, politician and entrepreneur
- Andrey Fedyaev, Russian cosmonaut
- Gennadiy Seleznyov, politician
- Kostya Tszyu, boxer
- Nikita Grebenkin, Profesional NHL Hockey Player (Philadelphia Flyers)
