= Turya =

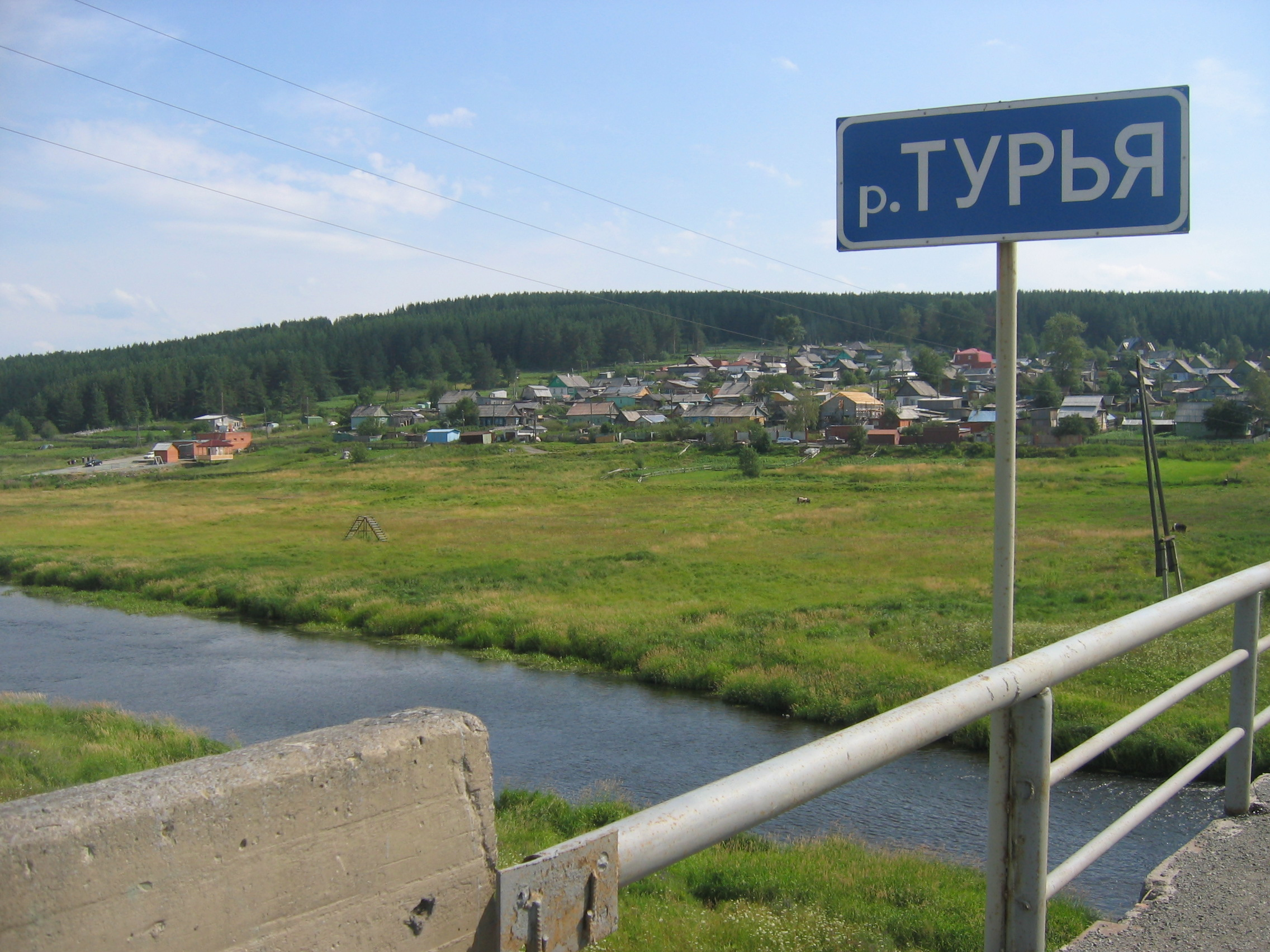
- The Turya at Krasnoturyinsk

Location
- Country: Russia
- Federal subject: Sverdlovsk Oblast

Physical characteristics
- Mouth: Sosva
  - coordinates: 59.7761°N 60.6724°E
- Length: 128 km (80 mi)
- Basin size: 1,160 km^{2} (450 sq mi)

Basin features
- Progression: Sosva→ Tavda→ Tobol→ Irtysh→ Ob→ Kara Sea

The Turya (Russian: Турья́) is a river in Sverdlovsk Oblast, Russia. It is a right tributary of the Sosva. It is 128 kilometres (80 mi) long, with a drainage basin of 1,160 square kilometres (450 mi^{2}).

The river has its sources in the boggy regions east of the central Ural Mountains. It flows eastwards through a relatively open and somewhat boggy landscape, and flows into the Sosva some 25 kilometres (16 mi) east of Krasnoturyinsk. The river is 10 to 40 metres (33 to 131 ft) wide. It freezes over in late October, and stays frozen until late April or early May. Along the Turya lie the towns of Krasnoturyinsk and Karpinsk.

In 1943 a dam was built across the river at Krasnoturyinsk. The resulting Bogoslovskoye Reservoir is 18 metres (59 ft) deep, about 0.5 kilometres (0.3 mi) wide and 8 kilometres (5 mi) long, and stretches to the neighbouring town of Karpinsk. Later, more dams were built upstream.

The river is polluted as a result of nearby industries, like the Bogoslovsky Aluminium Plant, a chicken factory, and a power plant, in addition to runoff from the towns of Krasnoturyinsk and Karpinsk.
