= Kakva =

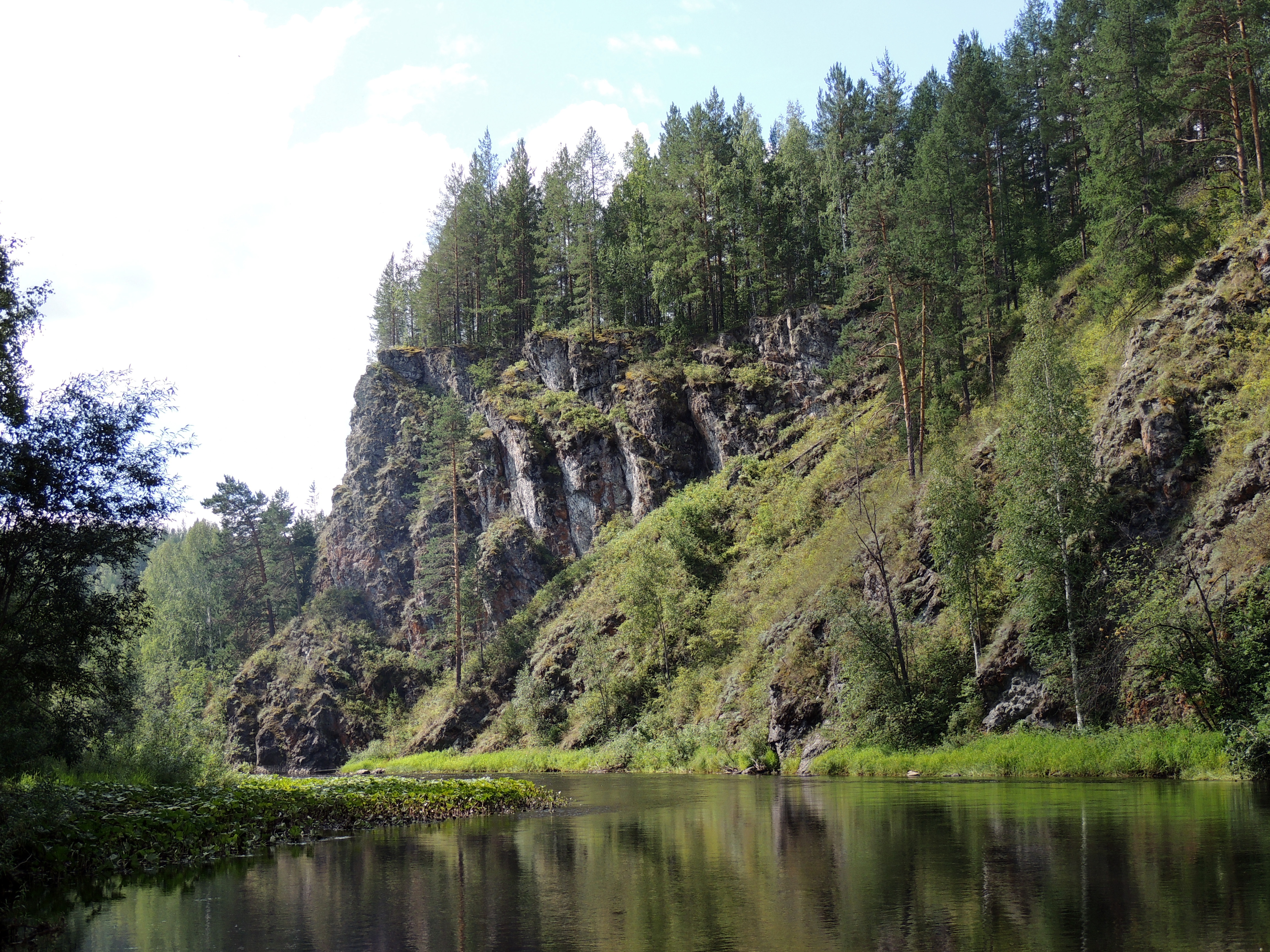

Location
- Country: Russia
- Federal subject: Sverdlovsk Oblast

Physical characteristics
- Mouth: Sosva
  - coordinates: 59.5953°N 60.7717°E
- Length: 170 km (110 mi)
- Basin size: 1,970 km^{2} (760 sq mi)

Basin features
- Progression: Sosva→ Tavda→ Tobol→ Irtysh→ Ob→ Kara Sea

The Kakva (Каква) is a river in Sverdlovsk Oblast, Russia. It is a right tributary of the Sosva (in the Ob's drainage basin). The river starts by the base of the Kavkinsky Stone on the eastern slopes of the Ural Mountains and flows eastwards to its confluence with the Sosva. It is 170 kilometres (110 mi) long, and has a drainage basin of 1,970 square kilometres (760 sq mi).

Along the river lies the town of Serov and the Kiselyovskoye Reservoir, upon which the small Kiselyovskaya Hydroelectric Plant is located. The reservoir was rebuilt after a catastrophic dam break in 1993, which caused major damage in Serov town.

== Name ==
Kakva translates as "pure water".

== See also ==
- Kakvinskie Pechi
