= Kakvinskie Pechi =

Kakvinskie Pechi Каквинские Печи
- Village
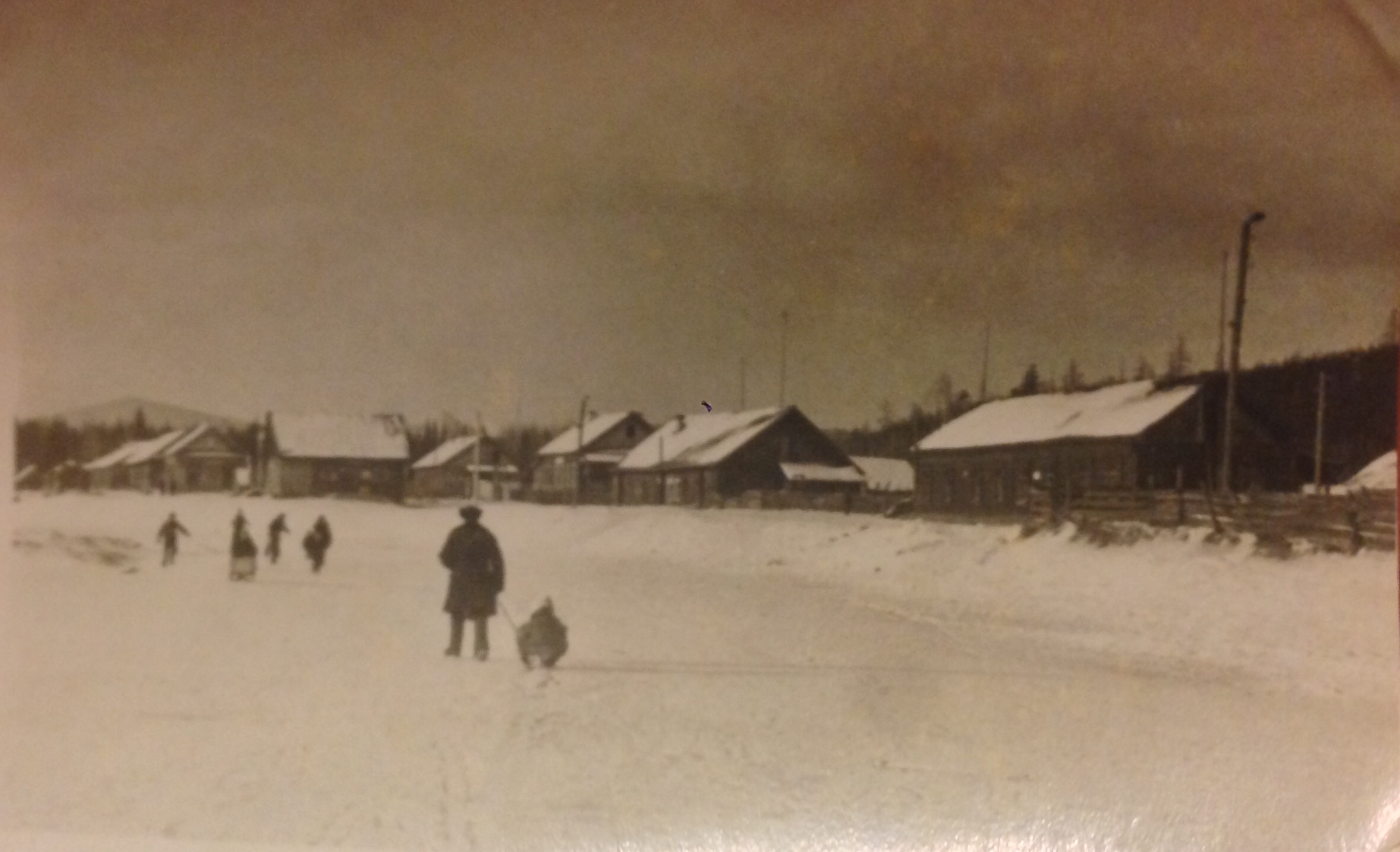

- Location within Russia
- Coordinates: 59°42′53″N 59°35′59″E
- Country: Russia
- Oblast: Sverdlovsk Oblast
- Urban okrug: Karpinsk Urban Okrug

Area
  - Total: 0.33 km^{2} (0.13 sq mi)

Population
  - Total: 69
  - Density: 210/km^{2} (540/sq mi)
- Time zone: UTC +5

Kakvinskie Pechi is a village situated on the left bank of the Kakva River, part of Sverdlovsk Oblast, Russian Federation. The name of the village means furnaces of Kakva, referencing a time when local iron factories burned coal. The village was founded by the Komi peoples, a Permian ethnic group whose homeland is in the north-east of European Russia. The village was founded by Komi people - Urals' indigenous people.

The village was liquidated in 2014.
