= Mount Narodnaya =

Mountain in Russia

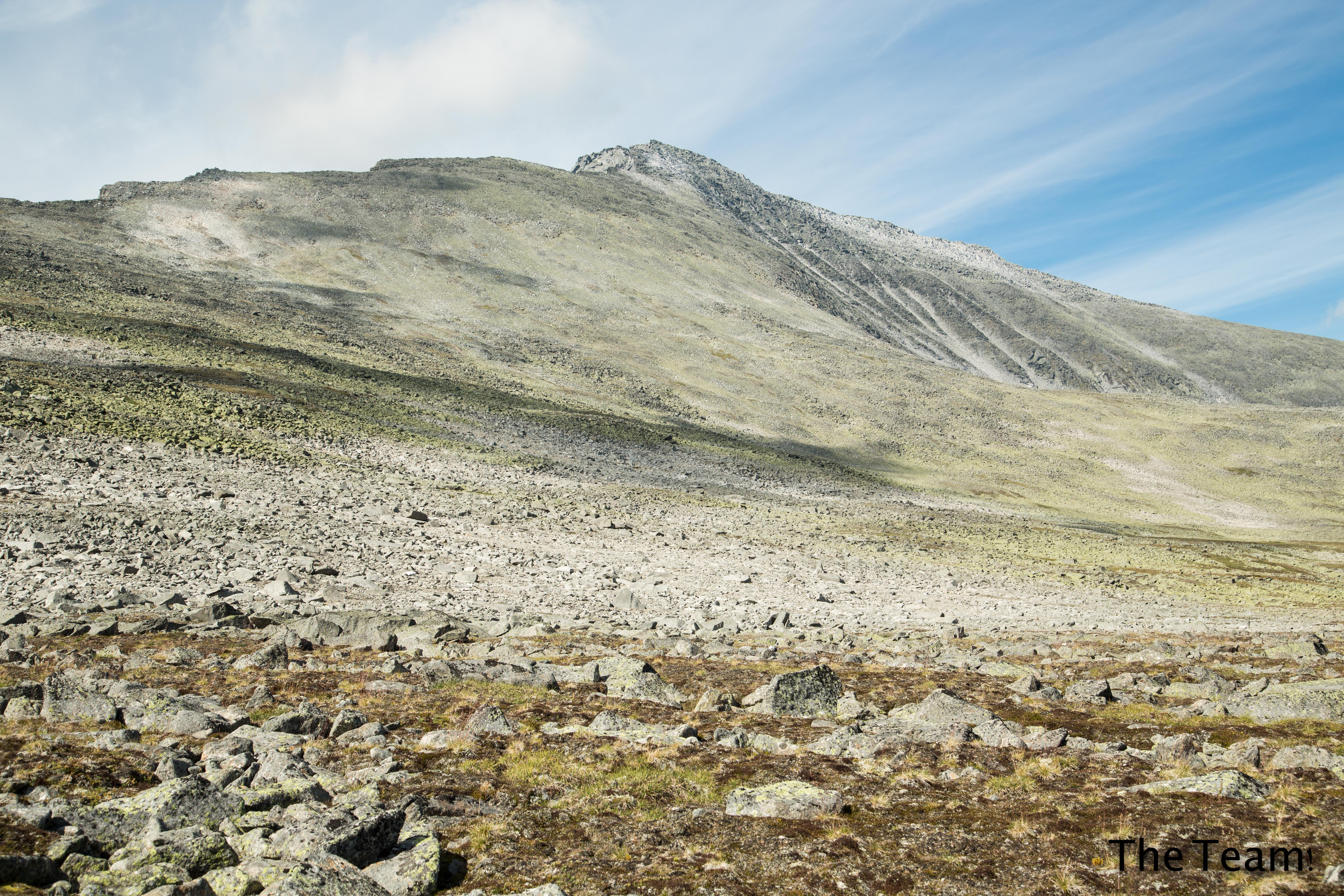
- Mount Narodnaya: View from the south.

Highest point
- Elevation: 1,894 m (6,214 ft)
- Prominence: 1,772 m (5,814 ft)
- Listing: Ultra, Ribu
- Coordinates: 65°02′N 60°07′E

Geography
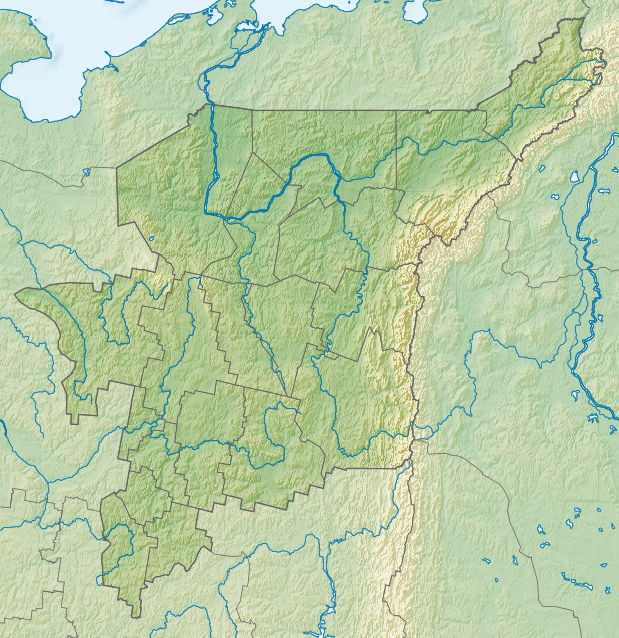
- Location within European Russia Location within Komi Republic
- Location: Komi Republic/Khanty–Mansi Autonomous Okrug in Tyumen Oblast, Russia
- Parent range: Ural Mountains

Climbing
- Easiest route: The North face

Mount Narodnaya (also known as Naroda and Poenurr; Russian: гора Народная, Komi: Народа-Из ("People's Mountain"), Mansi: Поэӈ-ур, Поэн-урр) is the highest peak of the Urals in Russia. Its elevation is 1,894 metres (6,214 ft). It is located on the border between Khanty–Mansi Autonomous Okrug in Tyumen Oblast and Komi Republic, the highest point being 0.5 km to the east from the border. The name may refer to Naroda River, which originates from the mount, located in the Research Range.

It is the highest point in European Russia outside the Caucasus. This leads to its large topographic prominence of 1,772 metres (5,814 ft). Narodnaya is located in the Ural mountains water divide, and therefore on the border between Europe and Asia: the Naroda river flows south-east from the summit into the Ob river in Siberia, and the Kos'yu river flows north-west from the summit into the Pechora river in Europe.

The mountain is formed with quartzites and metamorphosed slates of the Proterozoic Eon and Cambrian Period. There are some glaciers on the mountain. Also, there are sparse forests of larch and birch in the deep valleys at the foot of the mountain. The slopes of the mountain are covered with highland tundra.

The easiest route to the summit is a technically easy hike on the moderate north-west slope. Depending on snow and ice conditions, crampons may be required. The south wall of Narodnaya is steeper and less commonly used to reach the summit.

== See also ==
- List of highest points of Russian federal subjects
- List of European ultra prominent peaks
- Ural river
