= Sosva (river) =

River in Russia

Sosva Сосьва (Russian)
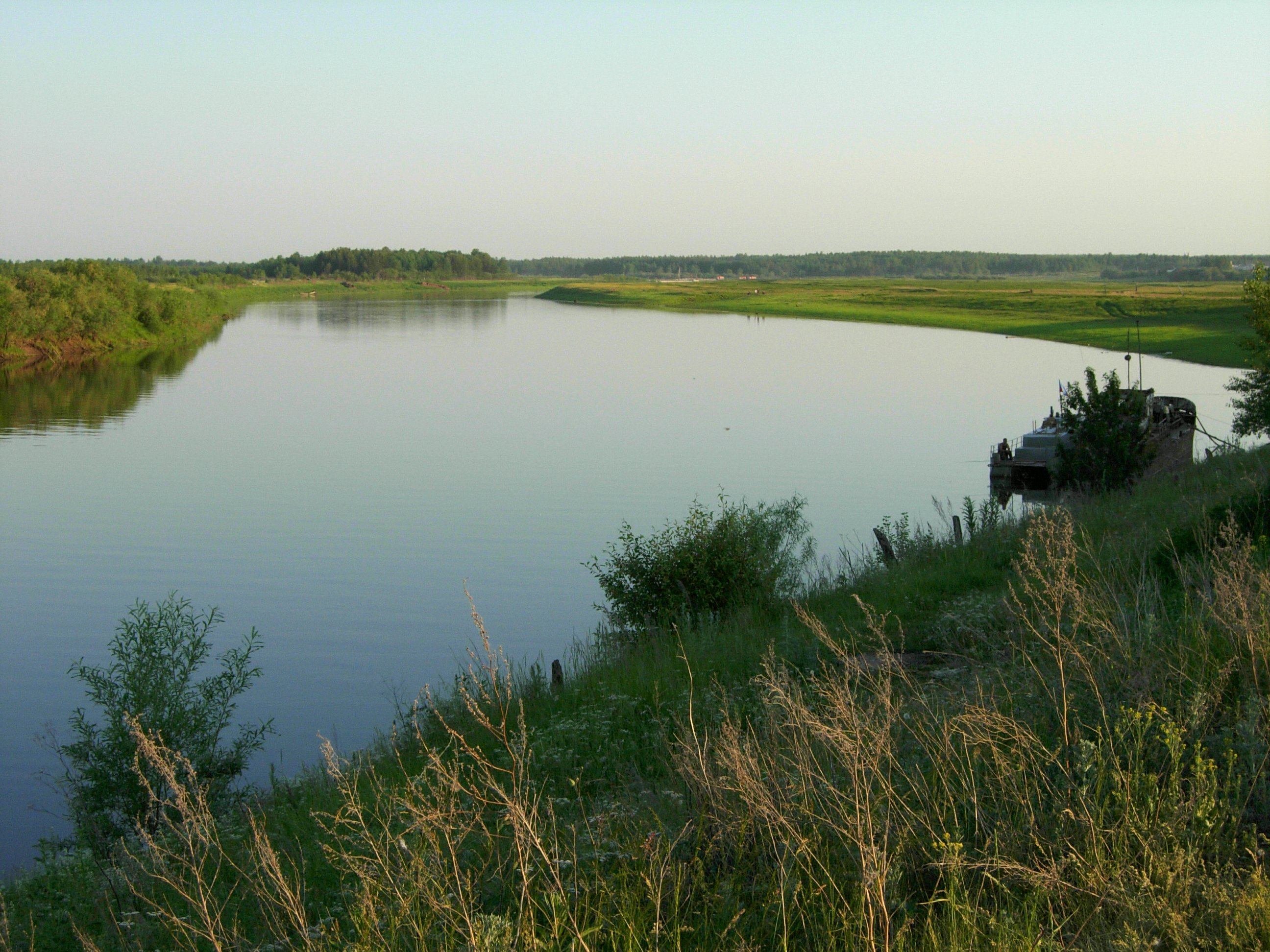

- Tobol river basin

Location
- Country: Russia
- Federal subject: Sverdlovsk Oblast

Physical characteristics
- Source
  - location: Northern Urals
  - coordinates: 60°7′43″N 59°7′36″E
- Mouth: Tavda
  - coordinates: 59°32′59″N 62°20′4″E
  - elevation: 56 m (184 ft)
- Length: 635 km (395 mi)
- Basin size: 24,700 km^{2} (9,500 sq mi)
- Discharge
  - average: 123.28 m^{3}/s (4,354 cu ft/s)

Basin features
- Progression: Tavda→ Tobol→ Irtysh→ Ob→ Kara Sea
- Tributaries
  - right: Vagran, Turya, Kakva, Lyalya

The Sosva (Russian: Сосьва) is a river in Sverdlovsk Oblast, Russia, a right tributary of the Tavda in the basin of the Ob. The length of the river is 635 kilometres (395 mi). The area of its drainage basin is 24,700 square kilometres (9,500 sq mi).

== Course ==
The Sosva is formed at the confluence of the Big and Small Sosva in the eastern slopes of the Northern Urals. It flows across the West Siberian Lowlands. Finally it meets the right bank of the Tavda River 719 km from its mouth.

The Sosva freezes up in early November and breaks up in April. It is navigable within 333 kilometres (207 mi) of its estuary.

Its main tributaries are the Vagran, the Turya, the Kakva, and the Lyalya.

== See also ==
- List of rivers of Russia
