= Research Range =

Mountain range in Russia

Research Range Ural
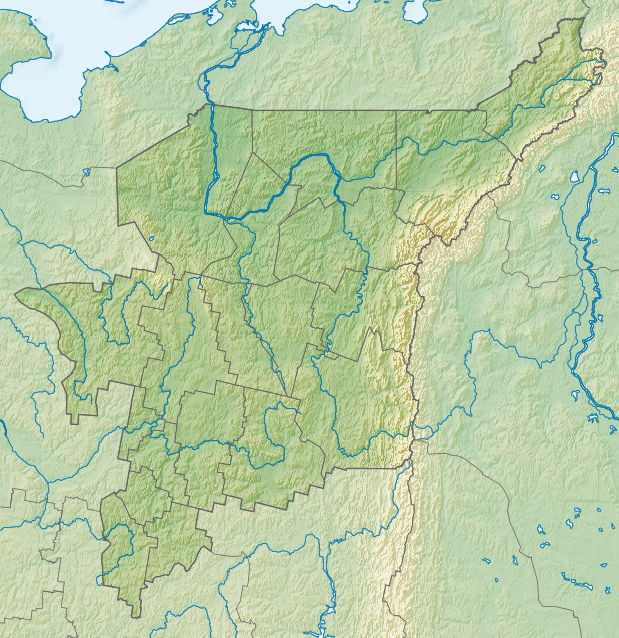
- Location within Komi Republic Location within European Russia

Highest point
- Elevation: 1,894 m (6,214 ft)
- Coordinates: 65.0333°N 60.1167°E

Geography
- Location: Komi Republic and Khanty–Mansi Autonomous Okrug, Tyumen Oblast, both in Russia
- Parent range: Ural Mountains

The Research Range (Russian: Исследовательский хребет) is a mountain range at the northern end of the Ural Mountains. It extends north of the Arctic Circle, and forms the border between the Komi Republic and the Khanty–Mansi Autonomous Okrug. The Research Range is 175 km long and the highest point is Mount Narodnaya (Гора Народная) or People's Mountain, at 1,894 m.

The Research Range starts approximately at Mount Narodnaya and runs northeastward past Vorkuta almost to the Kara Sea and the Arctic Ocean. The primary rocks are metamorphic, mostly quartzites and slate. There are numerous glaciers near the tops and on the upper slopes of the mountains, the rest is mostly arctic desert and tundra. In the foothills and steep river valleys, there is some taiga forest.

== Notable peaks ==
- Mount Narodnaya or People's Mountain, 1894 m.
- Mount Karpinsky, 1878 m.
- Mount Reguly, 1711 m. named after Hungarian explorer Antal Reguly (1819–1858)
- Mount Paier, 1472 m.
