= Telpos-Iz =

Mountain in Russia

- Телпо́с-Из; Telpoziz; Telposiz
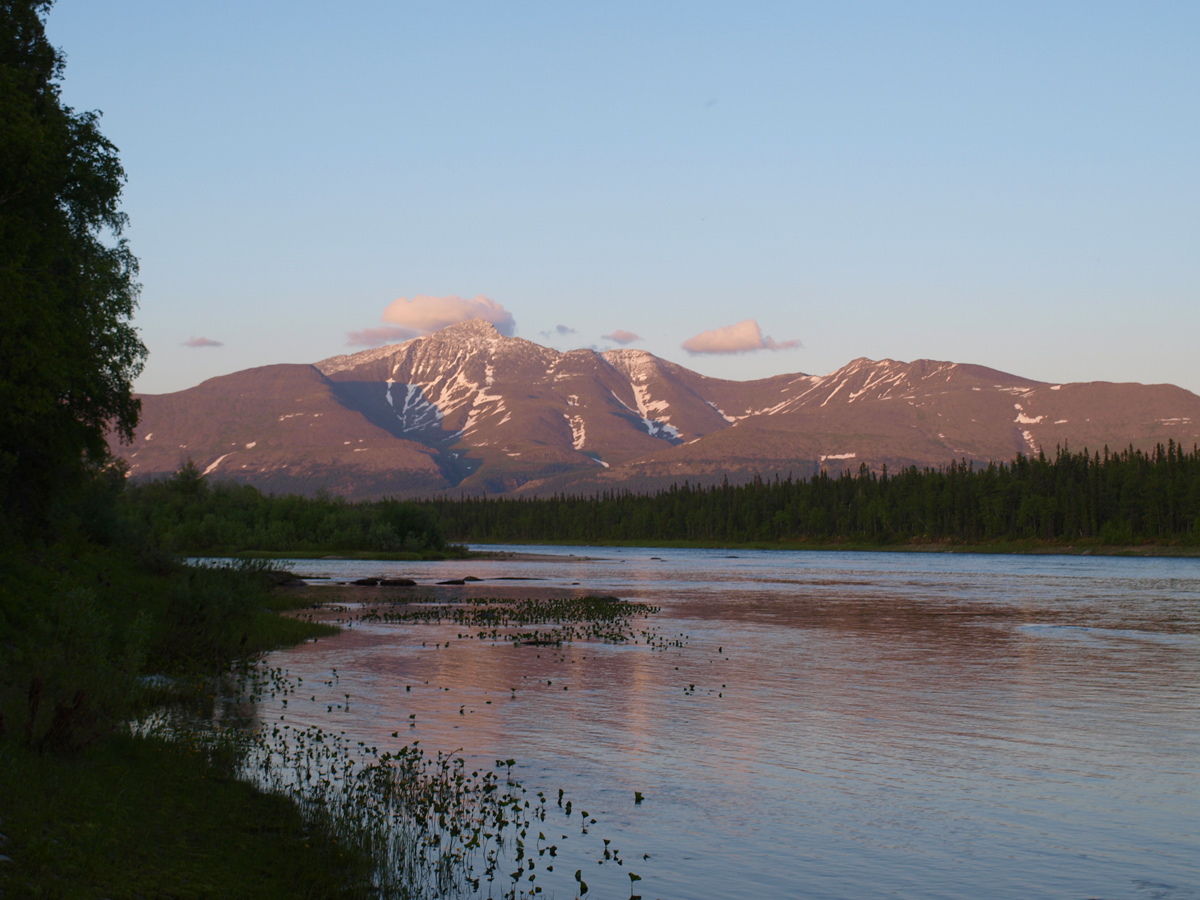
- View of Telpos-Iz from the mouth of the Telpos River

Highest point
- Elevation: 1,617 m (5,305 ft)
- Coordinates: 63°55′6.46″N 59°10′49.88″E

Naming
- Native name: Тӧльпозиз (Komi)
- English translation: Mountain of the Nest of Winds

Geography
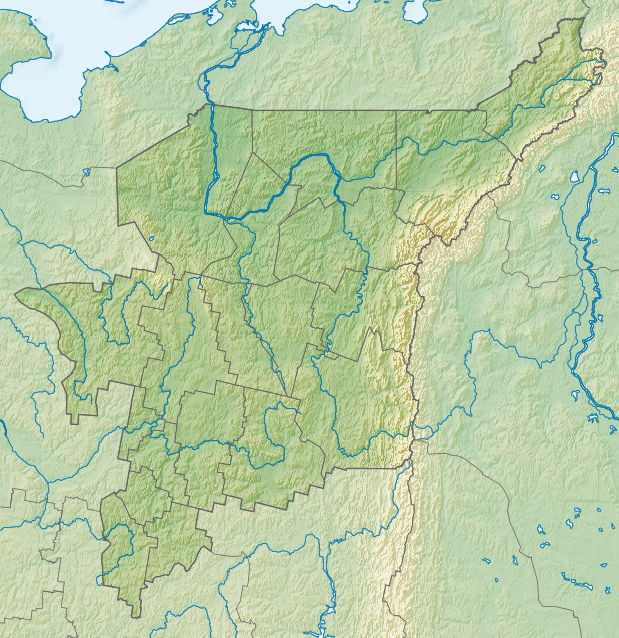
- Location within Komi Republic Location within Russia
- Country: Russia
- Federal subject: Komi Republic
- Parent range: Northern Urals

Telpos-Iz (also Telpoziz, Telposiz; Russian: Телпо́с-Из; Komi: Tölpoziz; historical transliterations Töll-Poss-Is, meaning "Mountain of the Nest of Winds") is the highest peak of the Northern Urals, in Russia. It lies on the left bank of the Shchugor River within Yugyd Va National Park in the Komi Republic, close to the conventional boundary between the Northern and Subpolar Urals.

The mountain reaches an elevation of 1,617 m (5,305 ft) above sea level and consists of a twin-peaked massif. It is composed primarily of crystalline schists, quartzitic sandstones and conglomerates. Its lower slopes are covered by taiga forest, while mountain tundra predominates above approximately 500 m.
