= Serov nickel deposit =

- Interactive map of Serov nickel deposit
- Location: Serov, Sverdlovsk oblast, Russia; 59°42′52″N 60°33′45″E
- Products: nickel-cobalt ore
- Production: 1 billion tons
- Type: depressive, lateritic, exogene/hypergene
- Discovered: 1973
- Opened: 1992

Serov nickel deposit (Elovskoe nickel deposit) is a lateritic nickel ore deposit in Russia, located in Sverdlovsk oblast, 10 kilometers north from Serov city. The balance reserves of oxidized nickel-cobalt ores are estimated at approximately 1 billion tons.

Currently, it is expected that the Serov (Serovskoye) deposit will produce about 1.7 million tons of ore per year. A quarry has been operating at the field for 30 years, during these years the necessary infrastructure has been created, including roads and railways, gas, water, energy supply, etc. The railway spur line to the quarry is stretched from the railway station Istochnik on the electrified Serov-Severouralsk line of the Sverdlovsk Railway. The name Elovskoe comes from the nearby (~2 km) village of Yelovka, standing on the Yelovka River.

Serov ore deposit group is the largest nickel object in the region. Elovskoe deposit is attached to Zamarayskaya mesozoic-cenozoic depression and is situated at areas of Kola, Usteya and Vagran serpentinite alpinotype massifs of the Ophiolite belt of the Urals. Ores of the Elovskoe deposit were formed by conversion of ultramafites of Kola dunite-harzburgite massif. Ore field is stretched meridionally as a crescent-shaped lode of 2.5 kilometers length and 100–650 meters width.

The base nickel-containing minerals of the deposit are montmorillonites, nontronites, chlorites and iron hydroxides. Elovskoe hypergene nickel deposit it the only one among all of the deposits of the Urals' weathering rind, where ferruginous chlorite chamosite is contained not in initial percentage, but act as rock-forming agent and compose specific nickel-bearing metasomatites of substantially chamosite structure, including clinochlore-brindleyite-chamositized metasomatites. Scientists from Saint Petersburg Mining University suggest that the deposit has deep hydrothermal roots, that increases possibility of discovering rich nickel ores in deeper excavations.
