= Antal Reguly =

Hungarian linguist and ethnographer

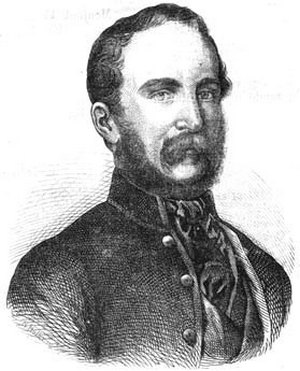
Antal Reguly

Antal (Anton) Reguly (Hungarian: Reguly Antal, 1819–1858) was a Hungarian linguist and ethnographer notable for his contribution to the study of Uralic languages. In 1843–1844 he became the first ethnographer to visit the Mansi (Vogul) people to collect data on their language and folklore. Reguly's field work among the Uralic peoples of Russia ruined his health, and he died young, leaving much of the material he had collected to be edited by his successors, including Pál Hunfalvy. Reguly also visited Finland and translated parts of The Kalevala into Hungarian.

The Reguly Antal Memorial Library and Reguly Antal Ethnographic Museum and Folk Art Workshop is in the town of Zirc, in Veszprém county, Hungary. Mount Reguly in the Research Range is also named for him.

== See also ==
- Matthias Castrén, Reguly's Finnish contemporary who conducted similar field work among the Uralic peoples of Russia

== Sources ==
- The Uralic Languages ed. Daniel Mario Abondolo (Taylor & Francis, 1998)
- Wickman, Bo (1988). "The History of Uralic Linguistics". In Sinor, Denis (ed.). The Uralic Languages: description, history and foreign influences. Leiden: Brill. pp. 792–818.
