= Basegi Nature Reserve =

Nature reserve in Perm Krai, Russia

- Russian: Басеги заповедник (Also: Bassegi)
- IUCN category Ia (strict nature reserve)
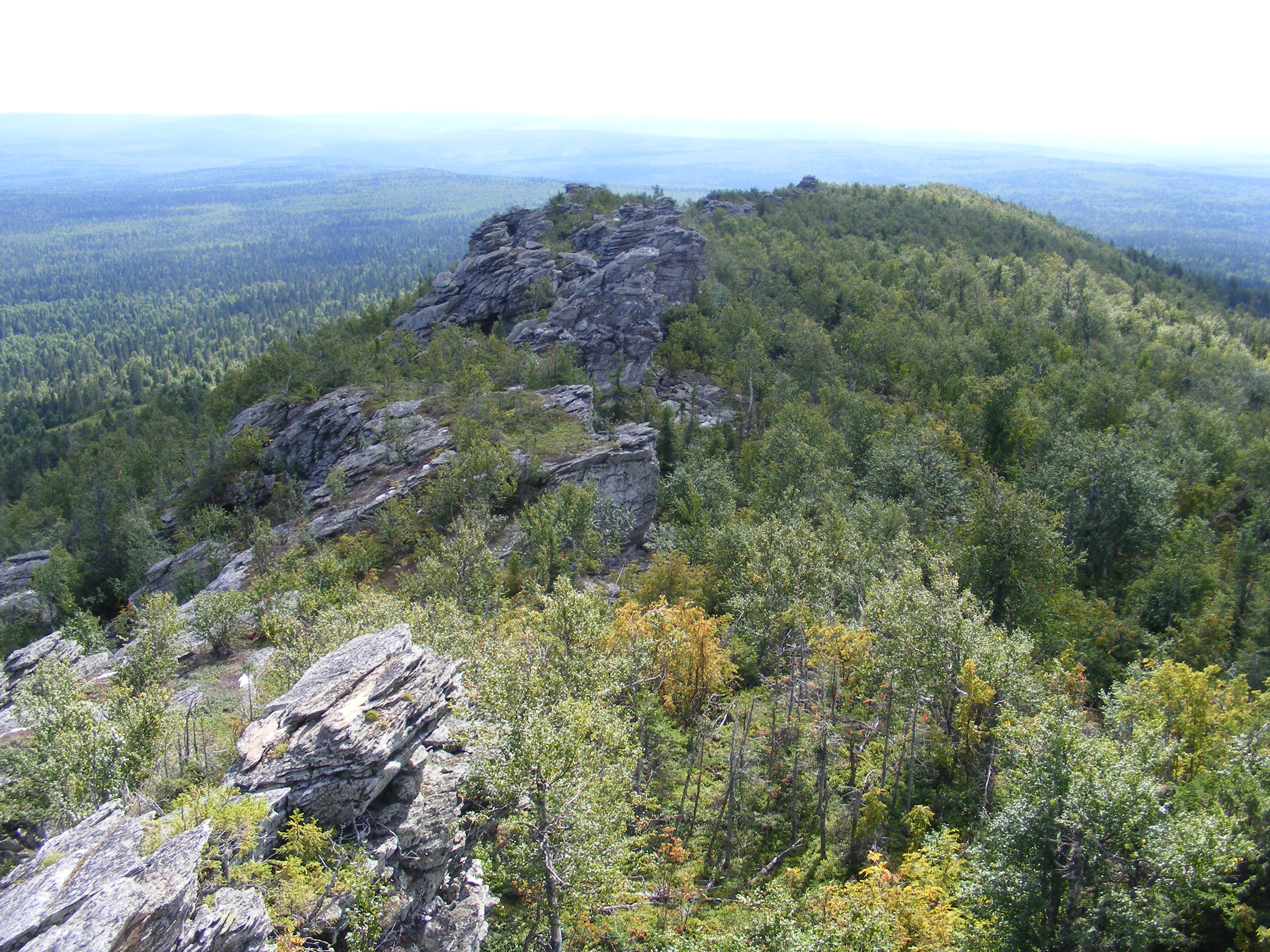
- Basegi Zapovednik

- Location within Russia
- Location: Perm Krai
- Nearest city: Gremyachinsk
- Coordinates: 58°3′0″N 58°2′0″E
- Area: 37,935 hectares (93,739 acres; 146 sq mi)
- Established: 1982
- Governing body: Ministry of Natural Resources and Environment (Russia)
- Website: http://www.basegi.ru/

Basegi Nature Reserve (Russian: Басеги заповедник, also Bassegi) is a Russian 'zapovednik' (strict nature reserve) along the Basegi Ridge in the Middle Ural Mountains. "Basegi" means "spectacular", "beautiful" in the local Urals Russian dialect. It is relatively untouched by commercial use, and thus the area has scientific value as a "reference site" for spruce-fir forests of the Urals. It also supports a spawning habitat for trout and grayling. The main rivers are the Usva (northern border of nature reserve) and the Vilva (southern border). There are also some small rivers that have rapids typical of mountain rivers. The reserve is situated in the Gremyachinsk area of Perm Krai.

== Topography ==
The reserve covers the Basegi Ridge, which runs north-south, and is divided into three sections (Southern, Middle and Northern Basegi) by steep ravines. The Basegi's geology is stable Lower Paleozoic and Proterozoic quartzite facing the surface with lesser amounts of granite and diabase. The main rivers are the Usva (northern border of the nature reserve) and the Vilva (southern border). There is also a network of smaller rivers.

== Climate and ecoregion ==
Basegi is located in the Urals montane tundra and taiga ecoregion, a region that covers the Ural Mountains in a band that is narrow from west-east, but runs up most of the divide between European and Asiatic Russia. The region is a meeting zones of taiga and tundra tree and plant species.

The climate of Basegi is Humid continental climate, cool summer (Köppen climate classification Subarctic climate(Dfc)). This climate is characterized by mild summers (only 1–3 months above 10 °C (50.0 °F)) and cold, snowy winters (coldest month below −3 °C (26.6 °F)).

== Flora and fauna ==
There are more than 250 species of plants in the nature reserve, among them more 45 are rare. Many species of mosses and lichens, 50 species of mammals, more than 180 species of birds, 1 species of reptile, 17 species of fish and 3 species of amphibians. The fauna is typical for taiga. Species, protected by Red Data Book of the Russian Federation, include:

- Lichens: Lobaria pulmonaria
- Plants: Calypso orchid
- Invertebrates: clouded Apollo butterfly and others
- Fishes: Hucho taimen and others
- Birds: golden eagle, Eurasian curlew, white-tailed eagle, peregrine falcon, black stork, Eurasian eagle-owl and others.

The reserve has a large community of shrews, of 6 species. In some years, the body mass of shrews can total over 70% of the total weight of vertebrates in the territory.

== Ecotourism ==
As a strict nature reserve, the Basegi Reserve is mostly closed to the general public, although scientists and those with "environmental education" purposes can make arrangements with park management for visits. There is an "ecotourist" hiking route to the top of North Basegi Mountain in the reserve, however, that is open to the public. Permits must be obtained in writing in advance. The main office is in the city of Gremyachinsk.

== See also ==
- List of Russian Nature Reserves (class 1a 'zapovedniks')
- Basegi (Range)
