= Basegi =

Basegi (Russian: Басеги) is a mountain range in Middle Ural. Located in the eastern portion of Perm Krai, on the border between Gremyachinsk and Gornozavodsky districts, it stretches meridionally. Its length is about 32 km, width is 5 km (in the widest central part). The highest point is the mountain "Middle Baseg" (994 m); it has a dome shape.

To the north of the range flows the Usva River and to the south is the Vilva River. The Basegi range is a source of most of the tributaries of these two main rivers. The Basegi Nature Reserve is located in the foothills of the range. To the north of the Basegi range is situated the highest point of Middle Ural, Oslyanka.

There are several stories about the origins of the name. One of them is that the name stems from the Komi-Permyak word 'basok' which means "beautiful". Another theory claims that ‘baseg’ is a composition of the words ‘bas’ (beautiful) and ‘eg’ (river).
