= Urals montane tundra and taiga =

Ecoregion which covers the main ridge of the Ural Mountains

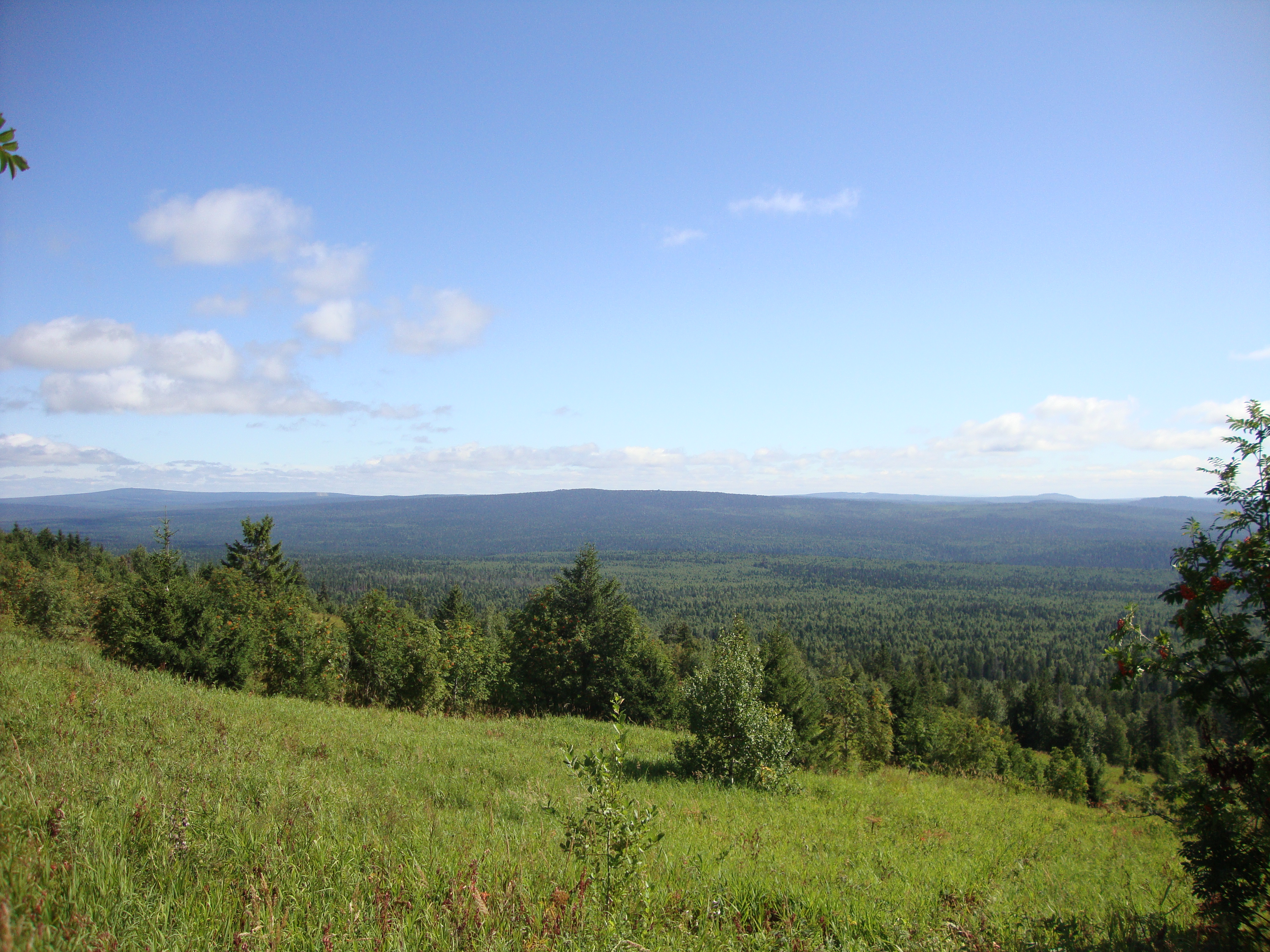
- Basegi Nature Reserve in the Urals

- Ecoregion territory (in purple)

Ecology
- Realm: Palearctic
- Biome: boreal forests/taiga

Geography
- Area: 174,565 km^{2} (67,400 sq mi)
- Climate type: Dfc

The Urals montane tundra and taiga ecoregion (WWF ID: PA0610) covers the main ridge of the Ural Mountains (both sides) - a 2,000 km (north-south) by 300 km (west-east) region. The region is on the divide between European and Asian ecoregions, and also the meeting point of tundra and taiga. It is in the Palearctic realm, and mostly in the Boreal forests/taiga ecoregion with a Humid continental climate, cool summer climate. It covers 174,565 km^{2} (67,400 sq mi).

== Location and description ==
The ecoregion is centered on the Ural mountains, a range that reaches heights of 1,895 m (6,217 ft). The western edge of the region is the Russian Plain, and the eastern edge is the beginning of the West Siberian Plain. To the north is the Northwest Russian-Novaya Zemlya tundra ecoregion, to the west are the Scandinavian and Russian taiga, Sarmatic mixed forests and East European forest steppe ecoregions, to the east the West Siberian taiga, and to the south the Kazakh steppe.

== Climate ==
The climate of the Urals is Humid continental climate, cool summer (Köppen climate classification (Dfc)). This climate is characterised by long cold winters, and short, cool summers.

Russia, Ural Mountains: 59.25 N, 58.25 E

Climate chart (precipitation, max. and min. temperature)
J	F	M	A	M	J	J	A	S	O	N	D
1.6 9 −5	1.1 13 −3	1.3 26 9	2.3 43 25	3 57 36	3.5 68 47	3.1 72 52	2.7 66 47	2.5 54 38	2.2 37 26	1.7 22 11	1 12 −1
- █ Average max. and min. temperatures in °F
- █ Precipitation totals in inches
- Source: World Weather Online
Metric conversion
J	F	M	A	M	J	J	A	S	O	N	D
41 −13 −21	28 −11 −19	33 −3 −13	58 6 −4	76 14 2	89 20 8	79 22 11	69 19 9	64 12 3	56 3 −3	43 −6 −12	25 −11 −18
- █ Average max. and min. temperatures in °C
- █ Precipitation totals in mm

== Protections ==
Large federally protected areas in the ecoregion include:

- Basegi Nature Reserve. An IUCN class Ia "strict ecological reserve" (a Zapovednik). (Area: 379 km2)
- Bashkirsky Nature Reserve. An IUCN class Ia "strict ecological reserve" (a Zapovednik). (Area: 4,961 km2)
- Pechora-Ilych Nature Reserve. An IUCN class Ia "strict ecological reserve" (a Zapovednik). (Area: 7,213 km2)
- Visim Nature Reserve. An IUCN class Ia "strict ecological reserve" (a Zapovednik). (Area: 335 km2)
- South Ural Nature Reserve. An IUCN class Ia "strict ecological reserve" (a Zapovednik). (Area: 2,528 km2)
- Zyuratkul National Park. An IUCN class II "national park". (Area: 874 km2)
- Taganay National Park. An IUCN class II national park. (Area: 568 km2)

== See also ==
- List of ecoregions in Russia
