= Visim Nature Reserve =

Strict nature reserve in Sverdlovsk Oblast, Russia

- Russian: Висимский заповедник (Also: Visimskiy)
- IUCN category Ia (strict nature reserve)
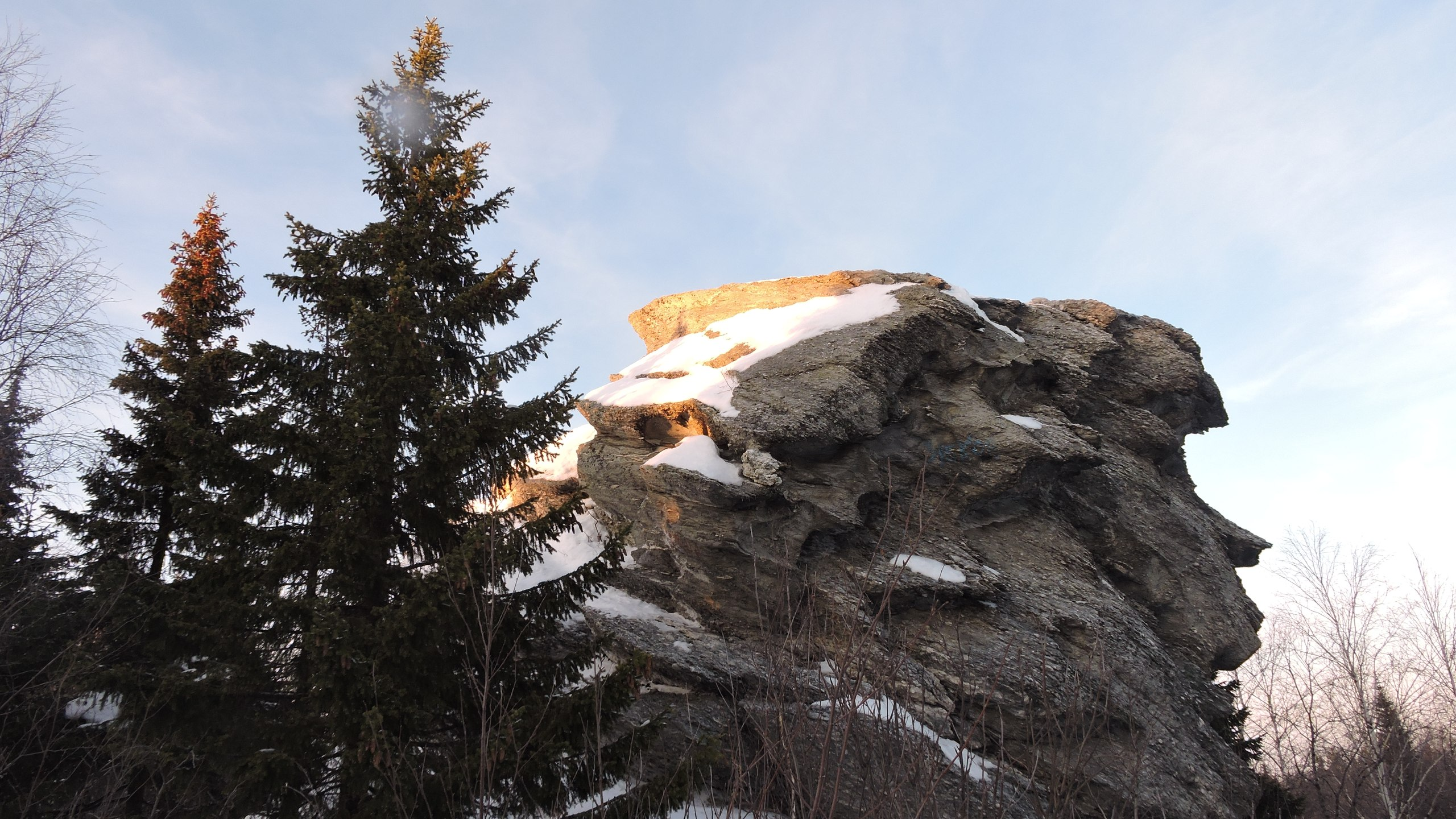
- "Old Stone Mountain", in Visim buffer zone

- Location within Russia
- Location: Sverdlovsk Oblast
- Nearest city: Kirovgrad
- Coordinates: 57°24′25″N 59°33′55″E
- Area: 33,487 hectares (82,748 acres; 129 sq mi)
- Established: 1971
- Governing body: Ministry of Natural Resources and Environment (Russia)
- Website: http://visimskiy.ru/

Visim Nature Reserve (Russian: Висимский заповедник) (also Visimskiy) is a Russian 'zapovednik' (strict nature reserve) protecting an area of southern taiga in the low Middle Ural Mountains. In 2001, it was named a UNESCO MAB Biosphere Reserve. It is named for the ancient village of Visim, which was home to the Russian writer Dmitry Mamin-Sibiryak, who wrote about rural life in the Urals. Most of the reserve is located on its western slope in the headwaters of the Sulyom River, a right tributary of the Chusovoi River, part of the vast Volga-Kama basin. Part, however is on the eastern slope in the Ob River watershed. The reserve thus straddles the Europe-Asia continental divide: water from the reserve flows into both the Caspian Sea through the Volga River, and the Kara Sea through the Ob River. The reserve is situated in the Kirovgrad District of Sverdlovsk Oblast, about 100 km northwest of Yekaterinburg.

== Topography ==
The Visim Reserve has a terrain that is mostly low mountains with conifer forests. The core reserve is roughly rectangular, 20 km across, with much larger buffer zones (where hunting and fishing are prohibited) to the north. The eastern part of the reserve is low mountains with relative heights of 250 to 300 meters, and a maximum height of 700 meters above sea level. The delineated biosphere includes the core region of Visimskiy (33,487 hectares), plus a buffer zone extending north for 46,000 hectares, and a transition zone extending for a further 100,000 hectares north.

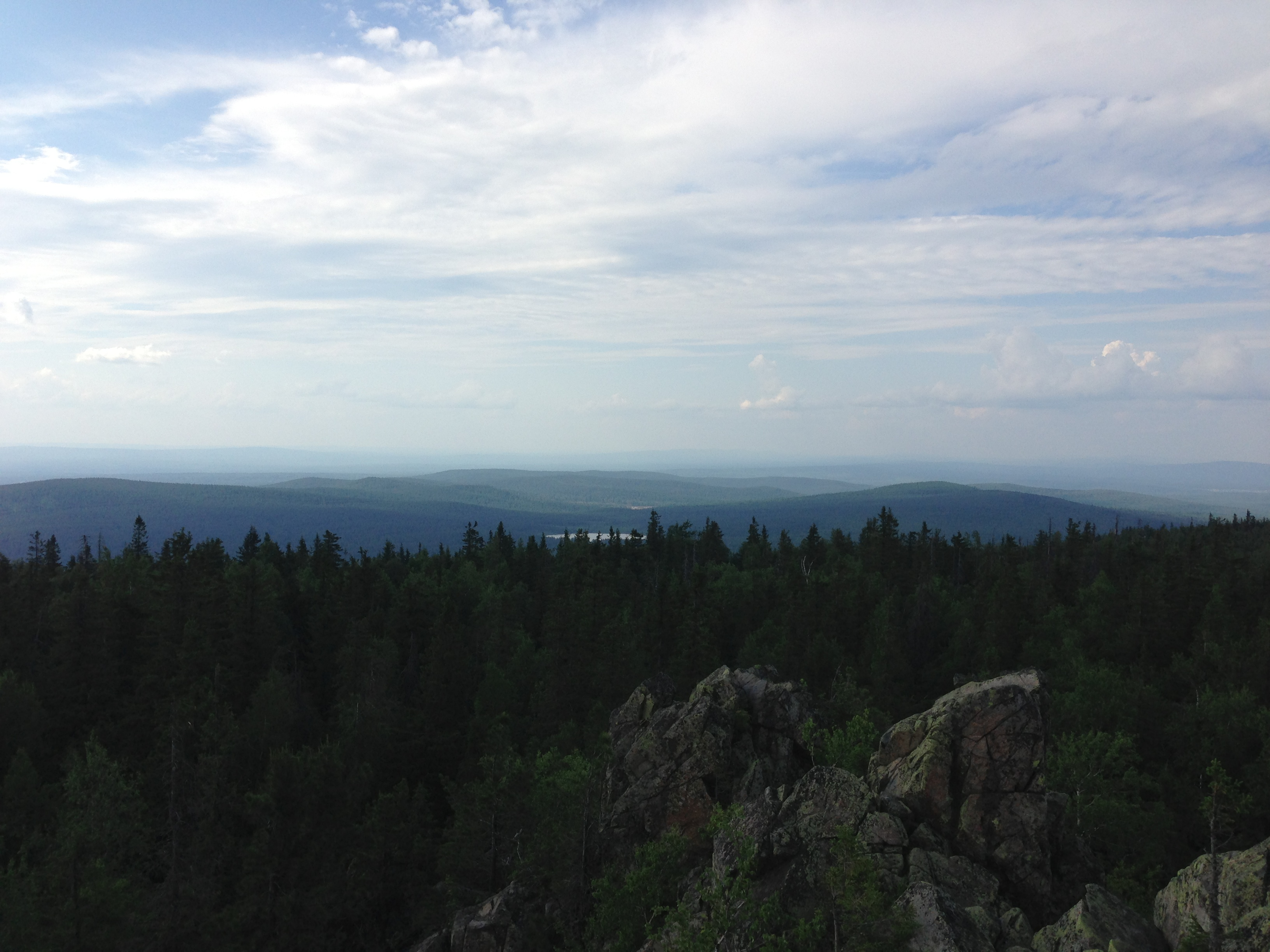
White Mountain, overlooking buffer zone in the north of the Visimskiy Biosphere

== Climate and ecoregion ==
Visim is located in the Urals montane tundra and taiga ecoregion, a region that covers the Ural Mountains in a band that is narrow from west-east, but runs up most of the divide between European and Asiatic Russia. The area is a meeting zones of taiga and tundra tree and plant species.

The climate of Visim is Humid continental climate, warm summer (Köppen climate classification (Dfb)). This climate is characterized by large swings in temperature, both diurnally and seasonally, with mild summers and cold, snowy winters. In the Visim Reserve, the growing season averages 141 days; average annual precipitation is 600 mm.

== Flora and fauna ==
The Visim Reserve serves as a reference for representative plant communities of the southern Urals mountain taiga. 56% of the plant species of the Middle Urals botanical region are found within Visimsky. Scientific study can study the relative growth patterns in old-growth forest (in the core reserve), secondary forest (particularly in the buffer zones where logging occurred in the 1950s), and transitional zone forests that have been affected by mining and other economic activity. Scientists on the reserve have recorded 435 species of vascular plants.

The reserve experienced extensive windfall damage during storms in 1995, and forest fires in 1998 and 2010, that left only 1,500 hectares in a pristine old-growth state. 86% of the territory is forested, with Siberian spruce, Siberian fir, and birch dominating the secondary forest.

The animal life of the reserve is typical of the Mid-Urals taiga: moose, wolf, bear, rabbit, beaver, marten, ermine, weasel, shrews and other rodents. Scientists on the reserve have recorded 48 species of mammals. 185 species of birds have been recorded, of which 125 are nesting.

== Ecoeducation and access ==
As a strict nature reserve, the Visim Reserve is mostly closed to the general public, although scientists and those with 'environmental education' purposes can make arrangements with park management for visits. The reserve is building three 'ecotourist' routes, however, that will be open to the public, but require permits to be obtained in advance. Public access is easier in the buffer and transition zones. The main office is in the city of Kirovgrad.

== See also ==
- List of Russian Nature Reserves (class 1a 'zapovedniks')
