= Nenets Nature Reserve =

Strict nature reserve in the Nenets Autonomous Okrug, Russia

- Russian: Ненецкий заповедник (Also: Nenetsky)
- IUCN category Ia (strict nature reserve)
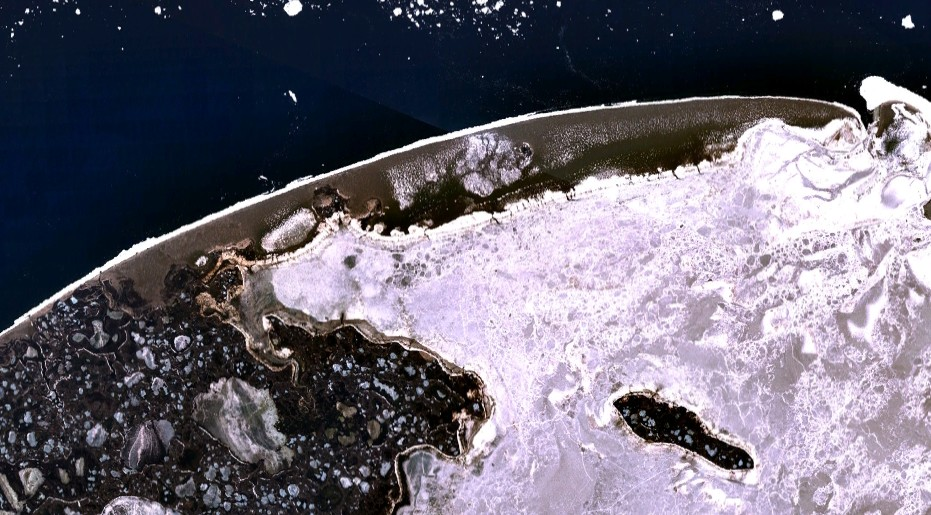
- Nenets Zapovednik

- Location within Russia
- Location: Nenets Autonomous Okrug
- Nearest city: Naryan-Mar
- Coordinates: 68°35′35″N 53°45′27″E
- Area: 313,400 hectares (774,428 acres; 1,210 sq mi)
- Established: 1997
- Governing body: Ministry of Natural Resources and Environment (Russia)
- Website: https://nenzap.ru/

Nenets Nature Reserve (Russian: Ненецкий заповедник) (also Nenetsky) is a Russian 'zapovednik' (strict nature reserve) in the northeast of European Russia on the coast of the Barents Sea and the delta of the Pechora River, about 800 km northeast of Arkhangelsk. With abundant wetlands, rivers, and sea islands, the reserve is an important point on the Atlantic migratory path for birds that winter in Western Europe and nest in the Eastern Europe and Western Siberian Tundra. Also present are large breeding grounds for the Atlantic Walrus. The reserve is situated in the Zapolyarny District of Nenets Autonomous Okrug. It was formally established in 1997, and covers and area of 313,400 ha (1,210 sq mi), of which 181,000 ha (700 sq mi) is over water.

== Topography ==
The Nenets Reserve is mostly flat lowland tundra (75%) and wetlands covered with multicolored mosses and lichens, on the river deltas of the Pechora and Neruta Rivers, the coast of the Barents Sea, and islands of the Barents Sea. The largest of the four sectors of the reserve is on the west side of the Pechora River Delta, reaching along the Zavorot Peninsula into the sea. There is a small sector on the east side of the Pechora along the Neruta River, and a sector that covers Bolvansky island to the northeast of the Pechora Delta.

== Climate and ecoregion ==
Nenets is located in the Northwest Russian-Novaya Zemlya tundra ecoregion. This ecoregion covers the northeast shore of the White Sea (the Kanin Peninsula), the coast of the Barents Sea east to the Yamal Peninsula, the southern half of Novaya Zemlya, and numerous inlets and islands. The low tundra wetlands are important breeding grounds for waterfowl.

The climate of Nenets is Humid continental climate, cool summer (Köppen climate classification Subarctic climate (Dfc)). This climate is characterized by mild summers (only 1–3 months above 10 °C (50.0 °F)) and cold, snowy winters (coldest month below −3 °C (26.6 °F)).

== Flora and fauna ==
On most of the reserve, the plant life is shrub-lichen tundra or shrub-moss-lichen tundra. Some the islands exhibit Arctic spotted tundra of which an indicator species is Arenaria pseudofrigida (a type of sandwort). A distinctive feature of Nenets is that the coastal meadows and marshes extend far inland, providing large areas for breeding birds. Scientists on the reserve have recorded 339 species of vascular plants and 474 and algae, and 176 species of lichen.

A scientific expedition to Matveyev Island in the reserve in 2015 counted over 600 walruses on the breeding grounds of the island. Common land mammals are the fox, and hare in thickets. Scientists on the reserve have recorded 26 species of mammals.

Waterfowl and coastal birds are abundant during the summer seasons; over 125 species are known to use the site. Common ones include geese, ducks, gulls, sandpipers and swans. The symbol of the reserve is the Bewick's swan (Tundra Swan), which nests in the reserve. The reserve is part of an Important Bird and Biodiversity Area (IBA), with, among other species, the vulnerable Long-tailed duck (Clangula hyemalis).

== History ==
The area is the home of the indigenous Nenets people, who historically followed a culture of reindeer herding, hunting, and fishing. Significant ecological concerns led to the creation of the Nenets Nature Reserve in 1997. The region contains widespread deposits of oil and gas, and the reserve protects a portion of the important wetlands. In 1980, a serious accident occurred at the Kumzhinskoye gas field in the Pechora River delta. Uncontrolled venting of gas occurred for seven years.

== Ecoeducation and access ==
As a strict nature reserve, the Nenets Reserve is mostly closed to the general public, although scientists and those with 'environmental education' purposes can make arrangements with park management for visits. The public is invited to join in guided tours aimed primarily at birdwatchers. There is a three-day general birdwatching tour offered by reserve scientists, and a "Artic House of Bewick's Swan" excursion. Other 'ecotourist' routes in the reserve may be open to the public, but require permits to be obtained in advance. The main office is in the city of Naryan-Mar.

== See also ==
- List of Russian Nature Reserves (class 1a 'zapovedniks')
- National Parks of Russia
