= Baltic mixed forests =

Ecoregion in Europe

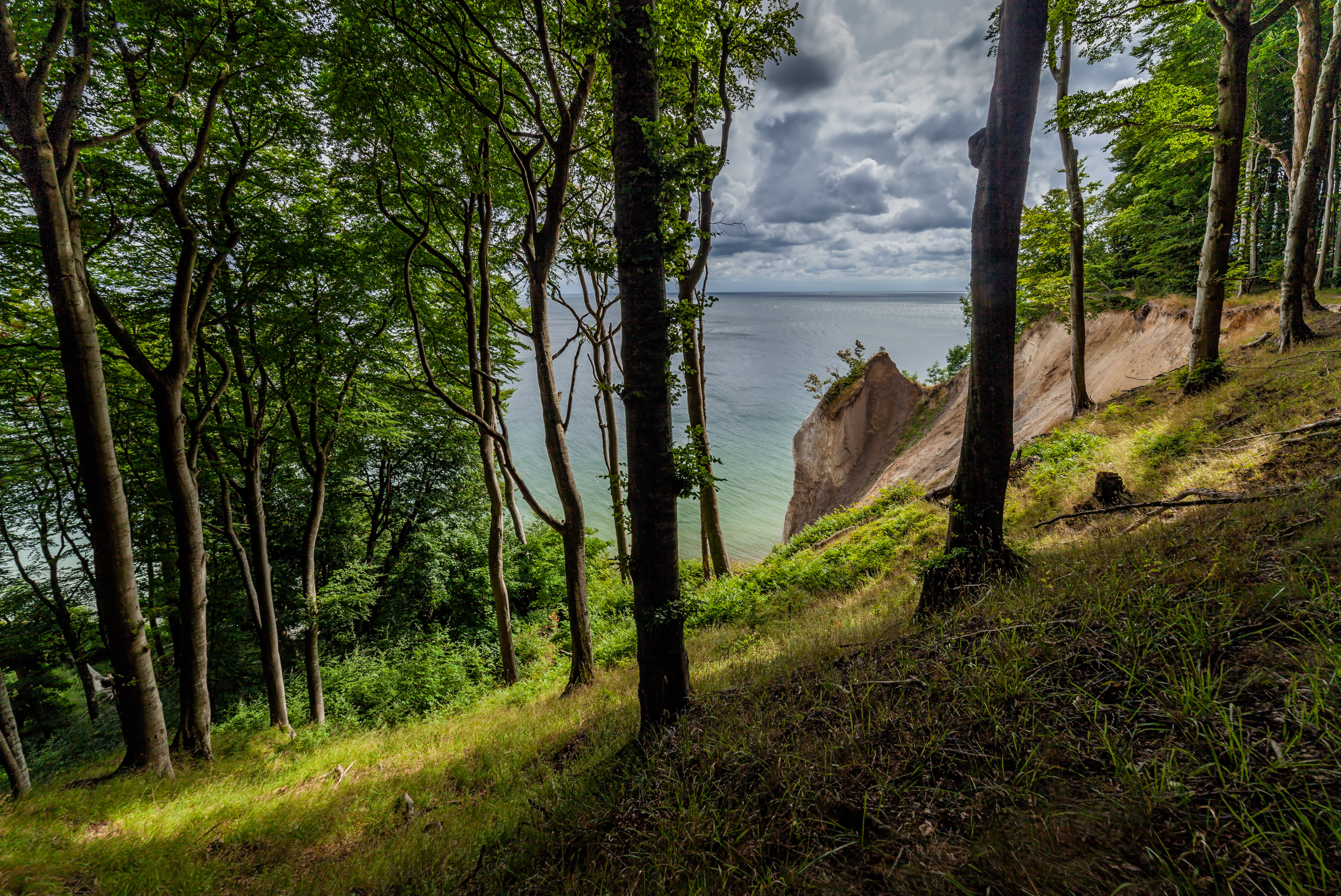
- Lowland mixed beech forest in a coastal climate (Jasmund National Park in Germany)

- Ecoregion PA0405

Ecology
- Realm: Palearctic
- Biome: Temperate broadleaf and mixed forests
- Borders: Sarmatic mixed forests; European Atlantic mixed forests; Central European mixed forests

Geography
- Area: 116,550 km^{2} (45,000 mi^{2})
- Countries: Denmark; Sweden; Germany; Poland
- Coordinates: 54°13′N 12°56′E

Conservation
- Conservation status: Critical/Endangered

The Baltic mixed forests is an ecoregion in Europe along the southwestern coasts of the Baltic Sea. The name was coined by the European Environment Agency. The same geographical area is designated as "Northern Europe: Denmark, Germany, Sweden, and Poland" ecoregion by the WWF.

== Distribution ==
Despite the name, Baltic mixed forests are not found in any of the Baltic countries. These countries are instead dominated by the Sarmatic mixed forests ecoregion, with the exception of southern Lithuania, which is within the northern reaches of the Central European mixed forests. Rather, Baltic mixed forests are found along the western and southern shores of the Baltic Sea, comprising northwestern Poland, northeastern Germany, eastern Denmark and the very southernmost tip of Sweden. More specifically, they are common in lowland areas on the eastern side of the Danish peninsula and submontane areas north of the Elbe and Oder Rivers.

== Flora ==
The ecoregion's natural habitat type is lowland to submontane beech and mixed beech forests. For the beech, European beech (Fagus sylvatica) is dominant. Other tree species that mix in, covers a broad array of mostly deciduous trees, but also conifer to a small extent. Oak, elm, ash, linden, maple, hazel, rowan and birch are common among the many deciduous trees mixed in with beech.

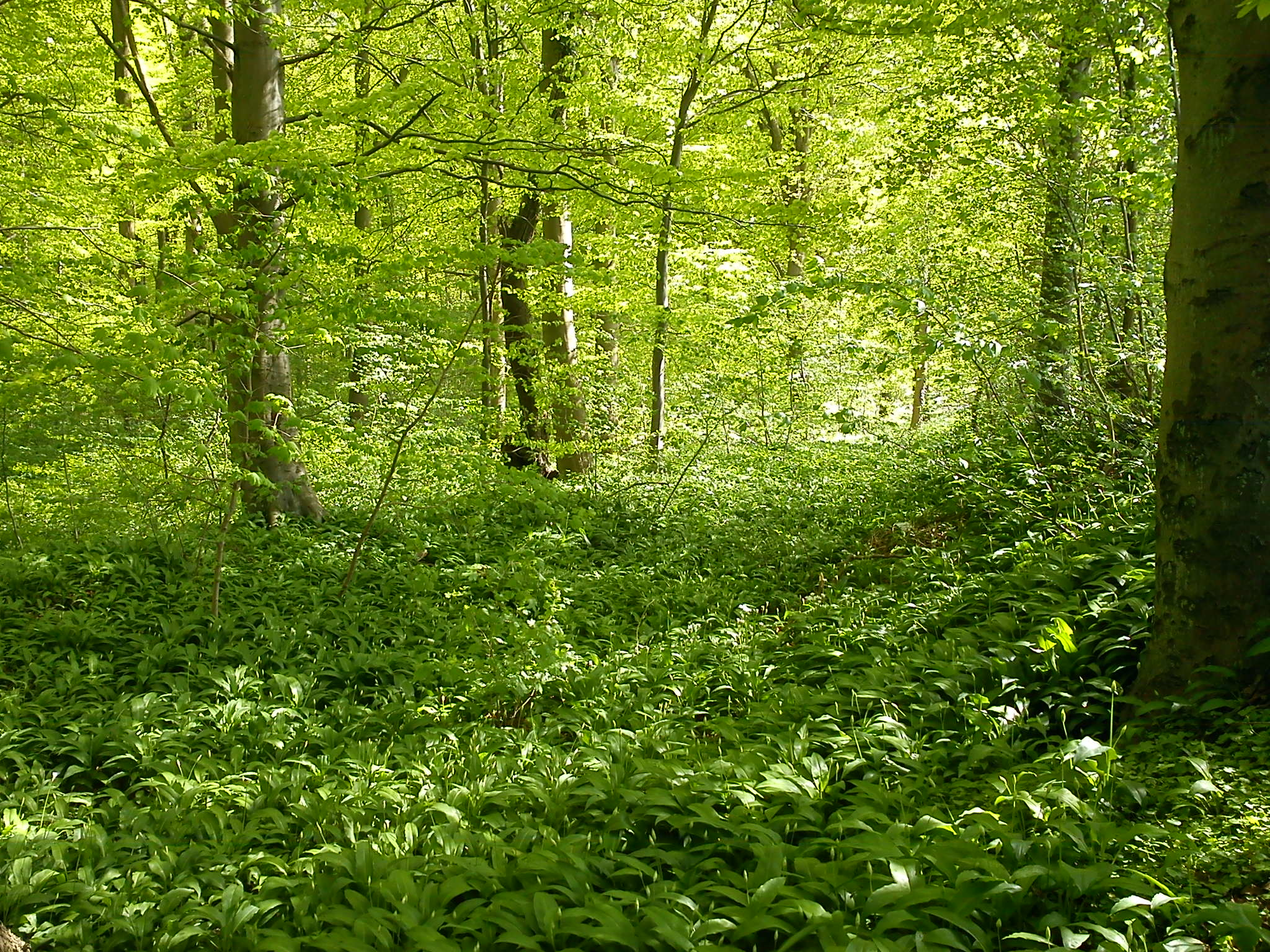
Early spring in a Baltic mixed forest

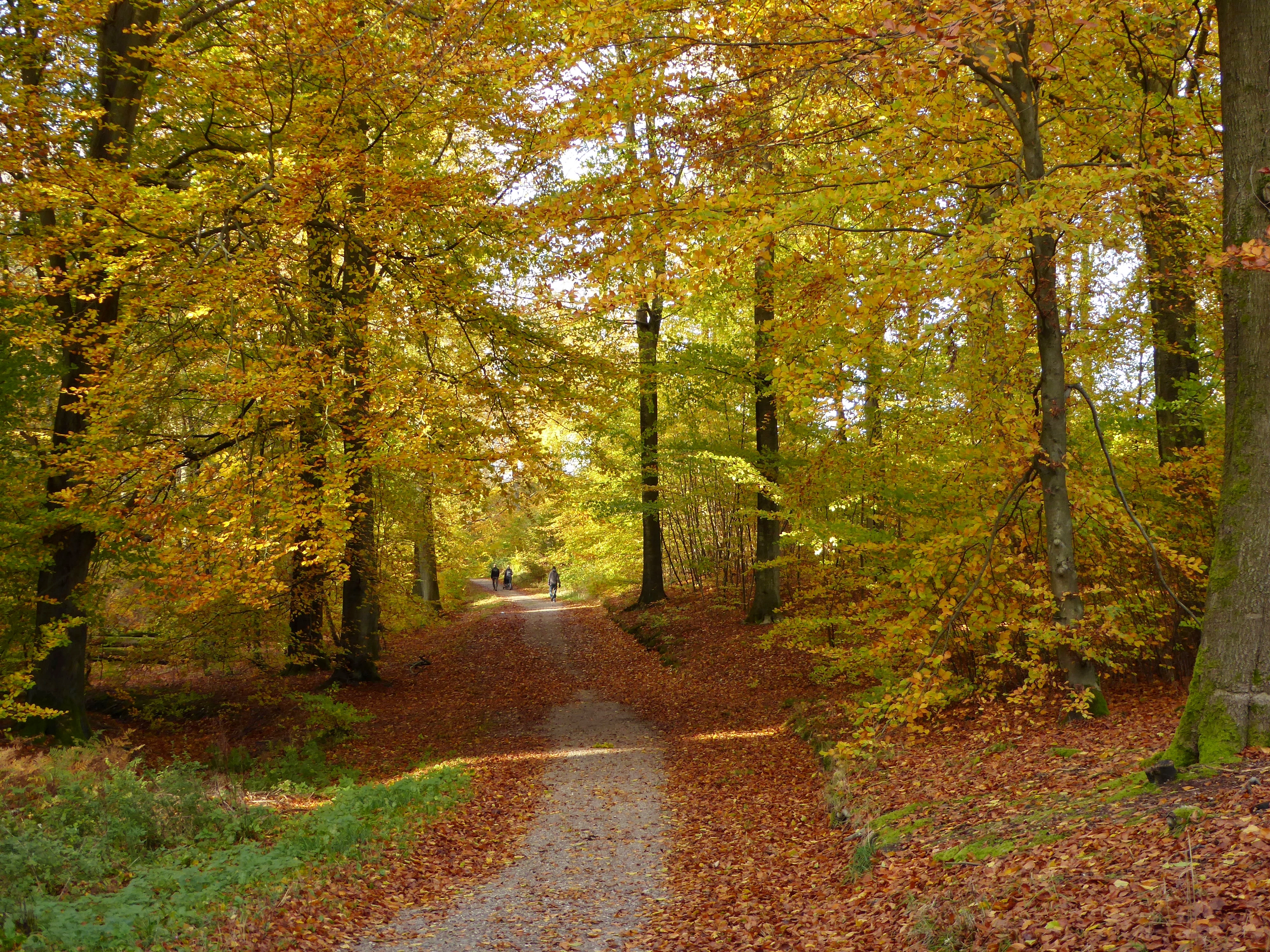
Autumn and leaf fall

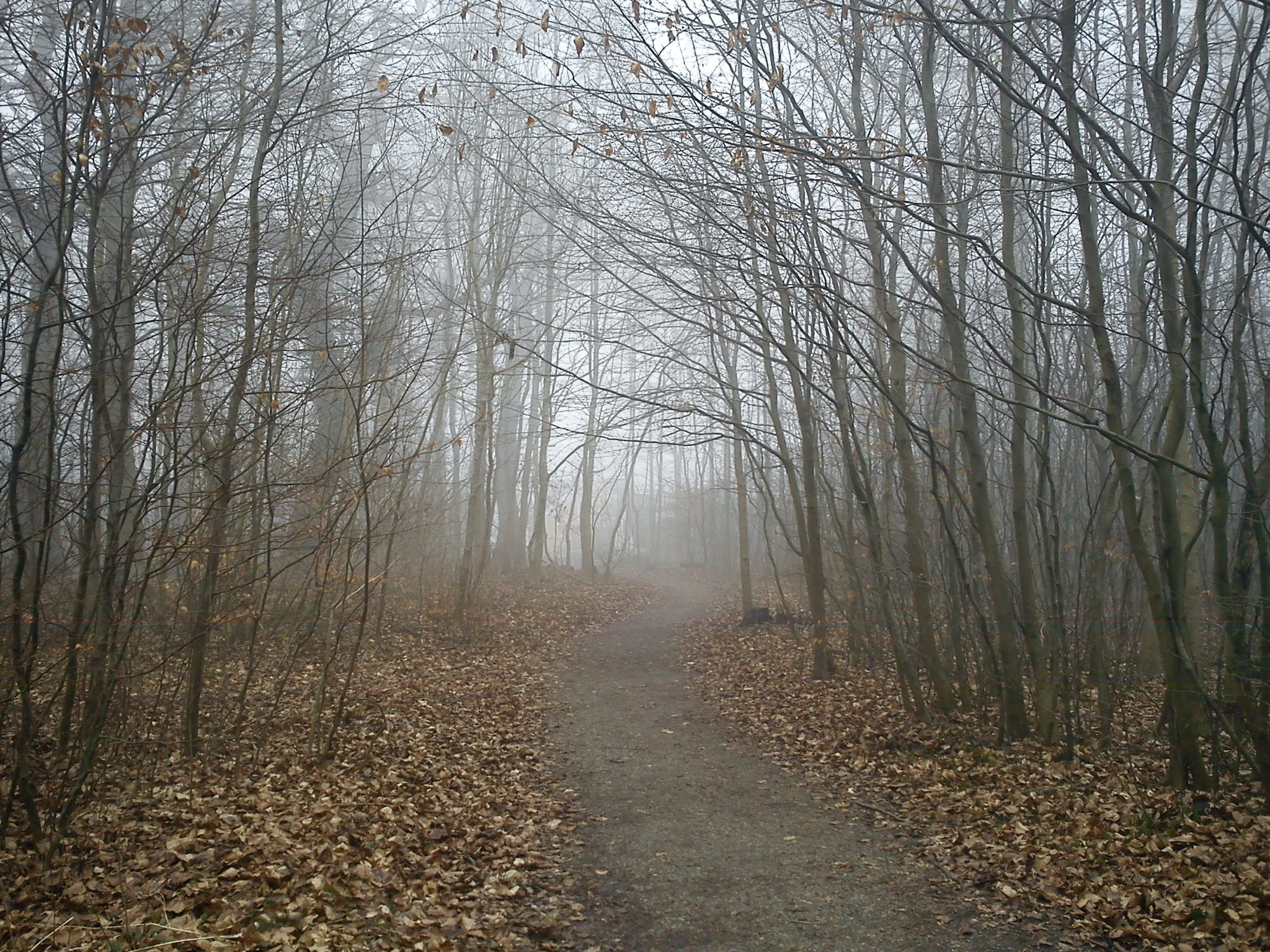
Winter

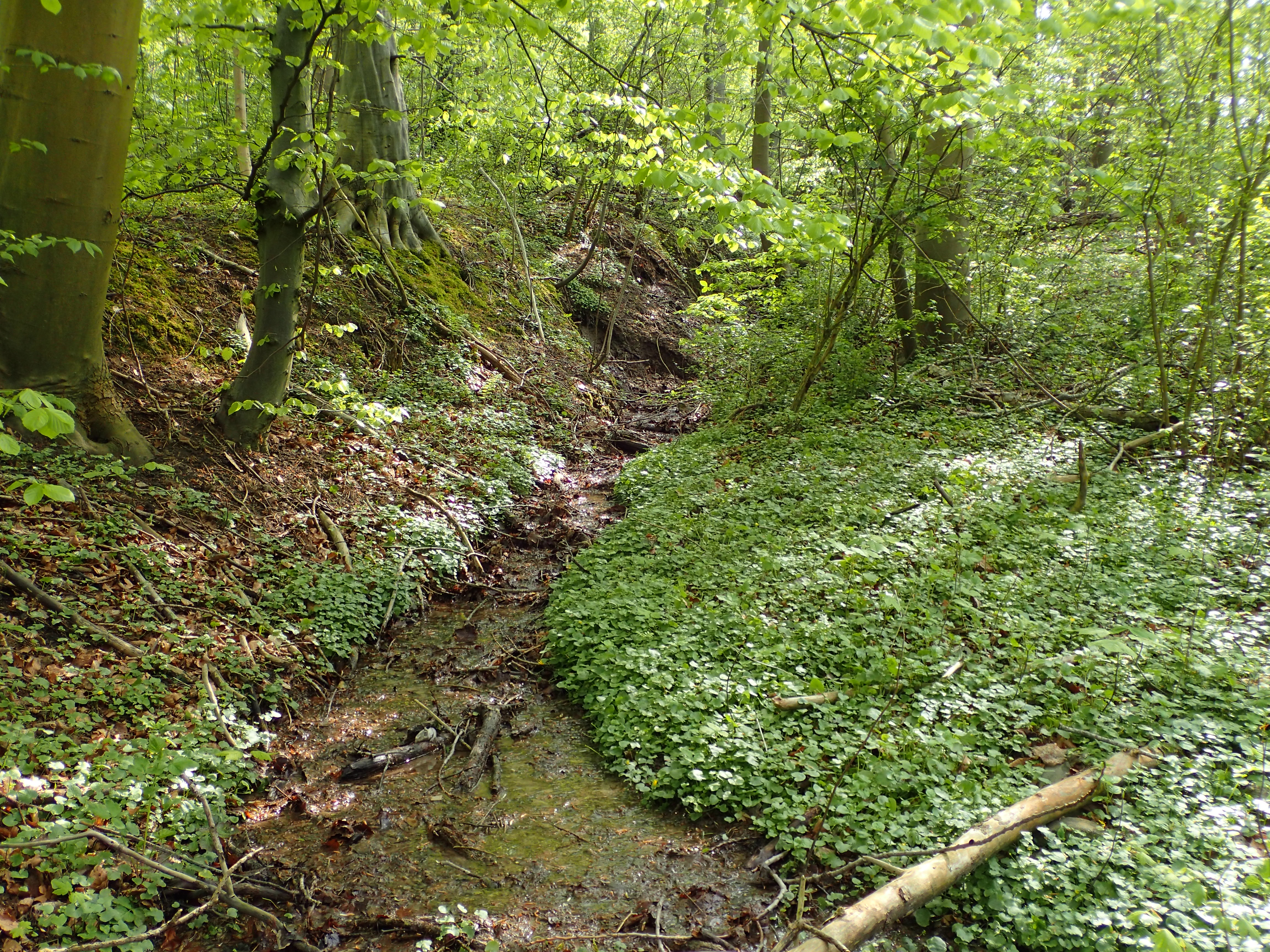
The forest floor

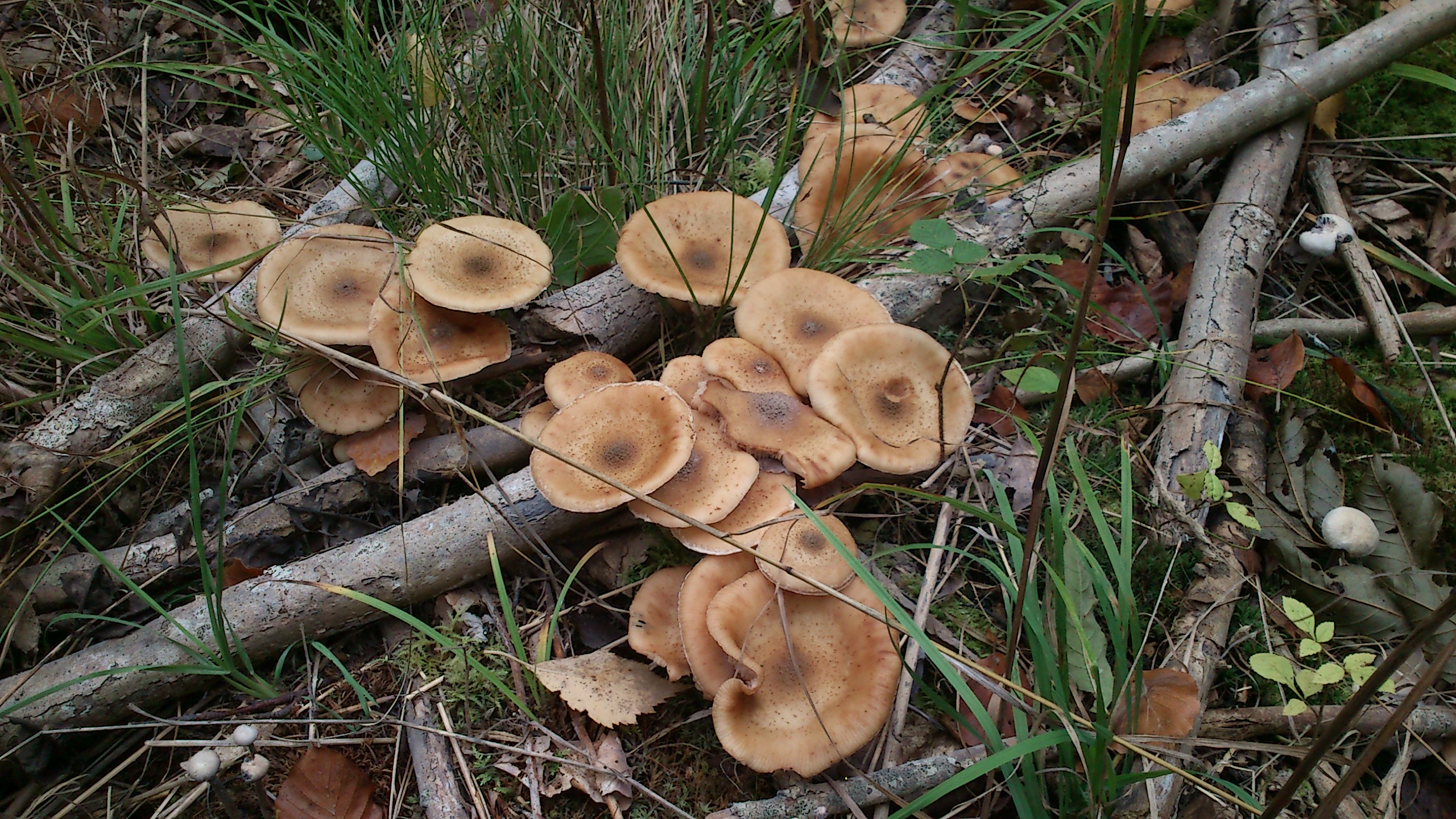
Beech forests are home to a plethora of fungi species (honey fungi)

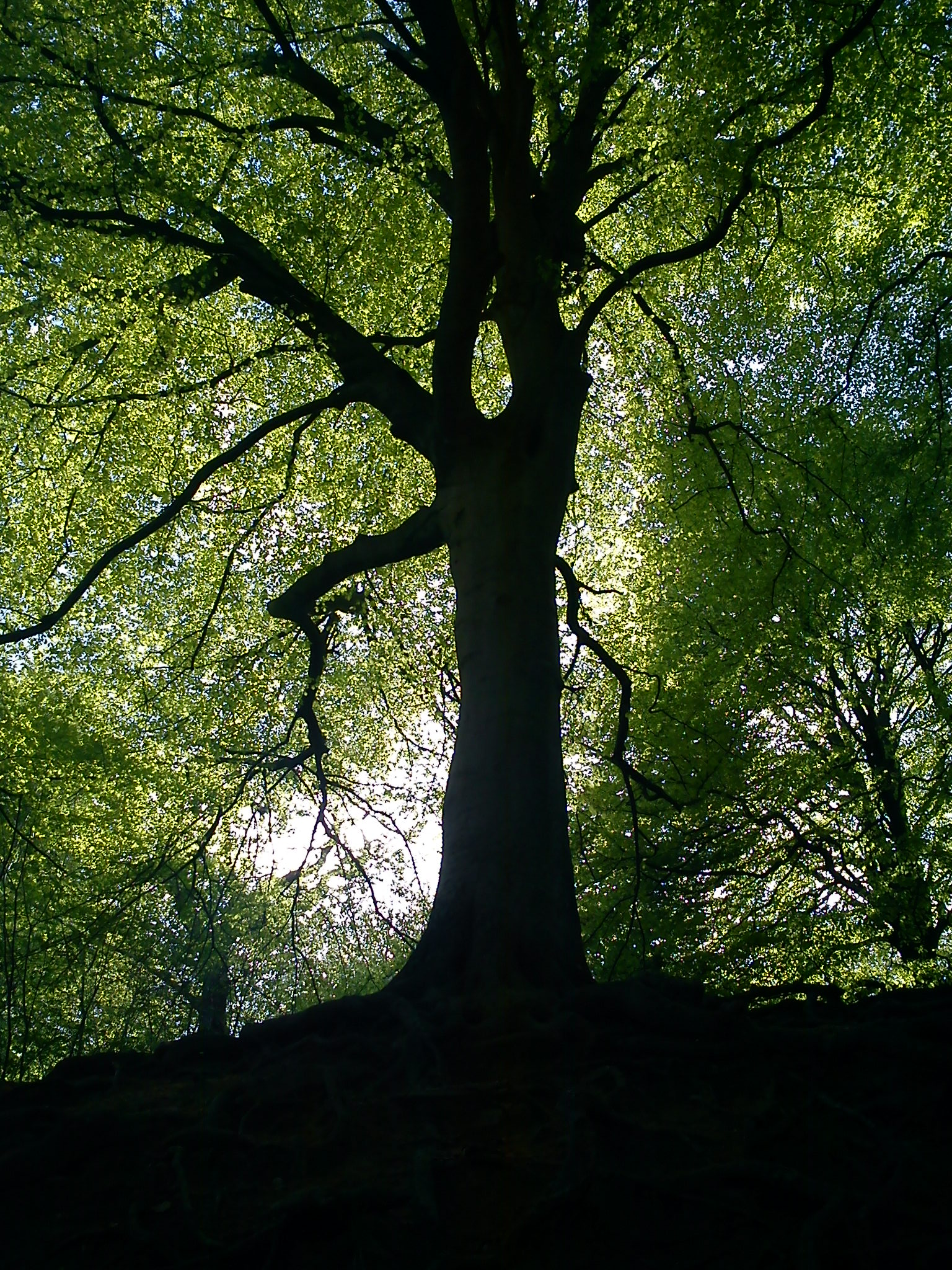
European beech is predominant for the natural state of this ecoregion

== Fauna ==
A large assortment of animals, mainly mammals, are found in this ecoregion. Among them are species such as red foxes, grey wolves, beech martens, red deer and european polecats. Hundreds of species of birds are also found in these forests, including but not limited to various species of woodpeckers, owls, tits, corvids and warblers.

== Ecological challenges ==
According to a 2015 study into the effect of climate change on the Baltic Sea Basin, the changes in temperature and precipitation patterns are likely to change the south-western Baltic forest's flora considerably, with a shift in the natural species composition towards more drought tolerant species, leading to a decrease in species diversity and a decrease in groundwater recharge. Similarly, the fauna of the region will also be adversely affected, due to the Baltic region's particularly sensitive nature to changes in salinity, which can have a cascading effect on food webs and interaction between aquatic and terrestrial ecosystems.
