= Kumzhinskoye gas field =

Gas field in Russia

- Location within Russia
- Country: Russia
- Region: Nenets Autonomous Okrug
- Offshore/onshore: onshore
- Coordinates: 68.16°N 53.835°E

Field history
- Discovery: 1974

The Kumzhinskoye gas field is a condensate gas field in the Nenets Autonomous Okrug of Russia. It lies within the Nenets Nature Reserve, in the Pechora River delta. A fire in an exploratory well, in November 1980, led to the use of a peaceful nuclear explosion in 1981 as an attempt to control the fire. Despite this, hydrocarbon escape occurred after the 37kt explosion, needing further relief well drilling.

As of the mid-2010s, the licence to the gas field is held by CH Invest Company. The size of the field is 225km^{2}, and is estimated to annually produce 3.2 billion cubic metres of natural gas and 170,000 tonnes a year of gas condensate.

== See also ==
- Nuclear Explosions for the National Economy
