= Oslyanka =

Mountain in Perm Krai, Russia

- Ослянка
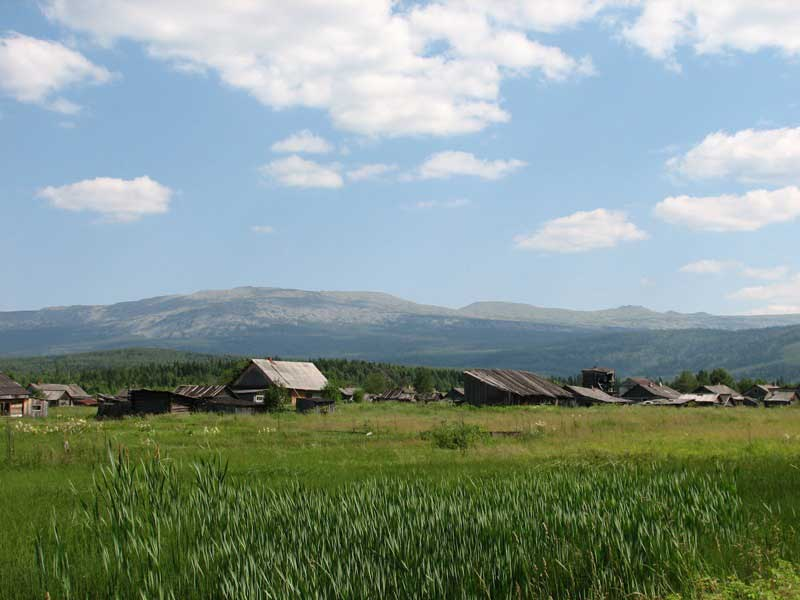
- View of Oslyanka from the village of Bolshaya Oslyanka

Highest point
- Elevation: 1,119 m (3,671 ft)
- Coordinates: 59°09′46″N 58°33′06″E

Geography
- Location within Russia
- Location: Kizelovsky District, Perm Krai, Russia
- Parent range: Basegi

Oslyanka (Russian: Ослянка) is a mountain in Russia. With an elevation of 1,119 m, it is the highest point of Middle Ural. Oslyanka is located in northeastern Kizelovsky District, Perm Krai, Russia. It lies to the north of Basegi mountain range and to southeast of Mount Nyarovsky Kamen. There are several tops with conical shapes located in the central part of the mountain, with buttes dominating the northern side. In elevations less 750 – 800 m, the slopes are covered by coniferous forests.
