= Sarmatic mixed forests =

Ecoregion in Europe

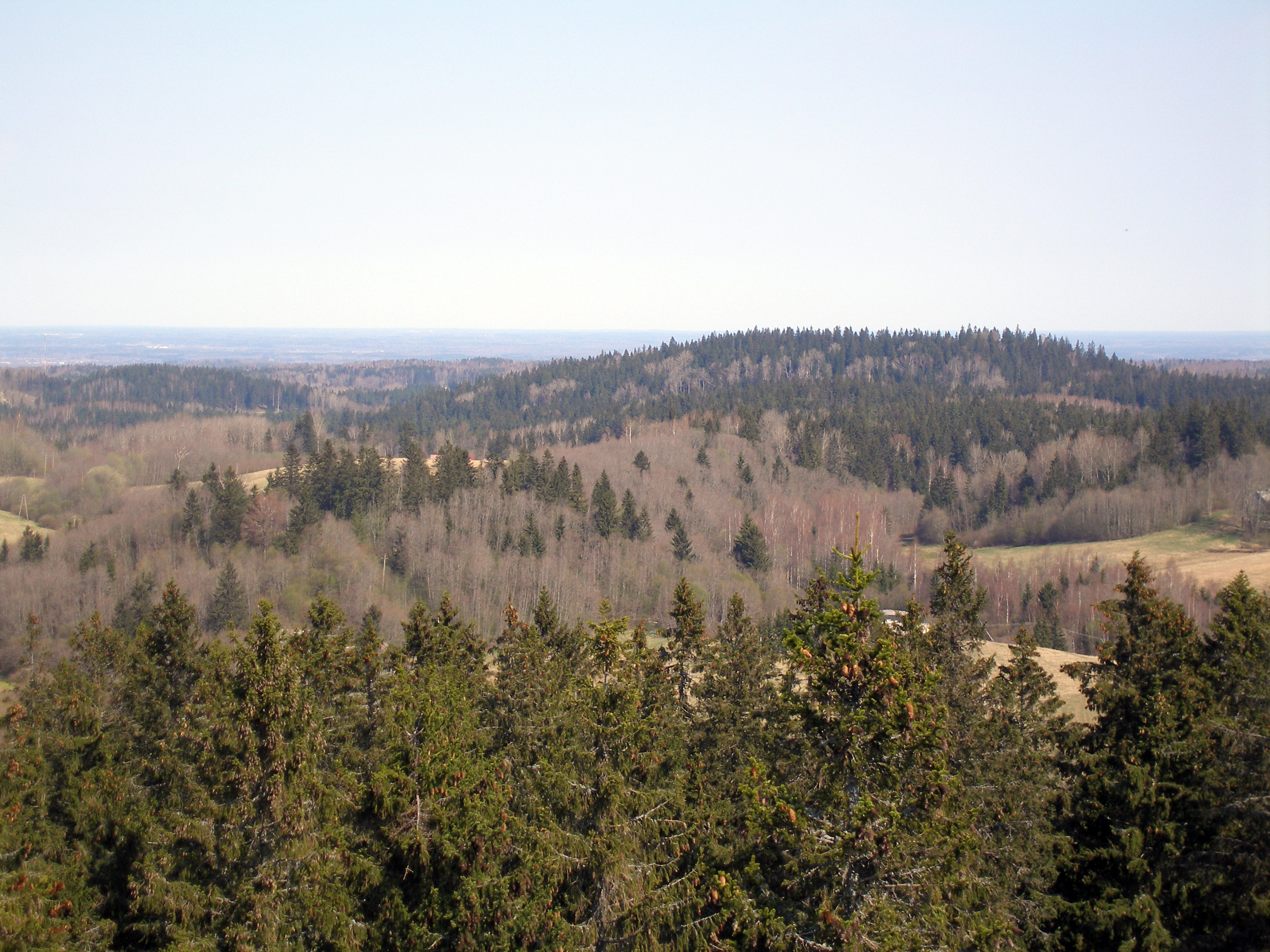
- Deciduous trees mixed with conifers

- Ecoregion PA0436

Ecology
- Realm: Palearctic
- Biome: temperate broadleaf and mixed forests
- Borders: List: Scandinavian and Russian taiga; Urals montane tundra and taiga; East European forest steppe; Central European mixed forests; Baltic mixed forests

Geography
- Area: 846,100 km^{2} (326,700 mi^{2})
- Countries: List: Norway; Sweden; Finland; Estonia; Latvia; Lithuania; Belarus; Russia
- Coordinates: 56°43′N 27°27′E

Conservation
- Protected: 84,571 km^{2} (10%)

The Sarmatic mixed forests constitute an ecoregion within the temperate broadleaf and mixed forests biome, according to the World Wide Fund for Nature classification (ecoregion PA0436). The term comes from the word "Sarmatia".

== Distribution ==
This ecoregion is situated in Europe between boreal forests/taiga in the north and the broadleaf belt in the south and occupies about 846,100 km^{2} (326,700 mi^{2}) in southernmost Norway, southern Sweden (except southernmost), southwesternmost Finland, northern Lithuania, Latvia, Estonia, northern Belarus and the central part of European Russia.

It is bordered by the ecoregions of Scandinavian and Russian taiga (north), Urals montane tundra and taiga (east), East European forest steppe (southeast), Central European mixed forests (southwest) and Baltic mixed forests (west), as well as by the Baltic Sea. The Neris Regional Park, encompassing both sides of the river Neris, represents a transition zone between the Central European mixed forests in the southwest and the Sarmatic mixed forests in the northeast.

== Description ==
The ecoregion consists of mixed forests dominated by Quercus robur (which only occasionally happens further north), Picea abies (which disappears further south due to insufficient moisture) and Pinus sylvestris (in drier locations). Geobotanically, it is divided between the Central European and Eastern European floristic provinces of the Circumboreal Region of the Holarctic Kingdom.

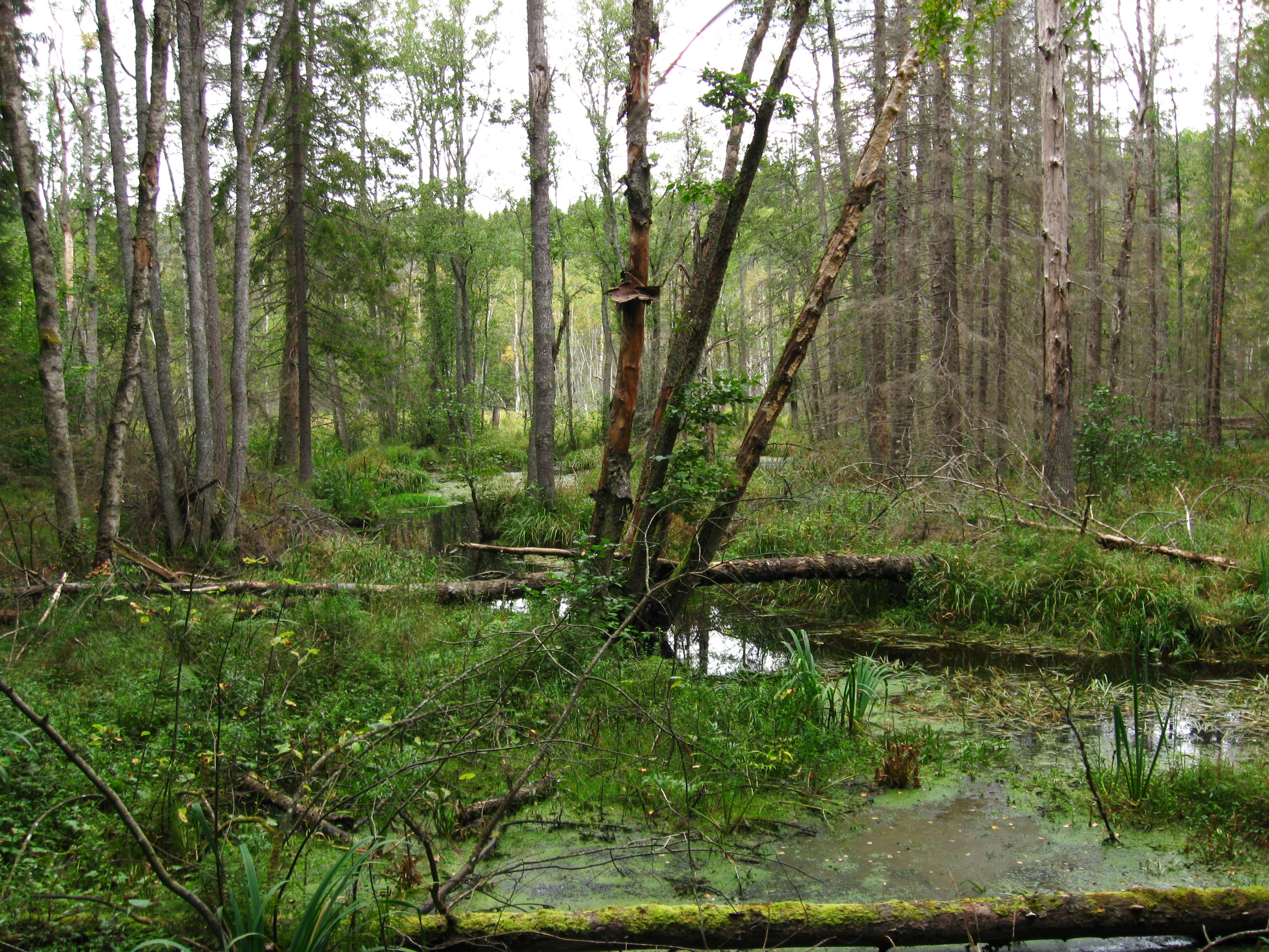
Stockholm - Swamp in a sarmatic mixed forest.

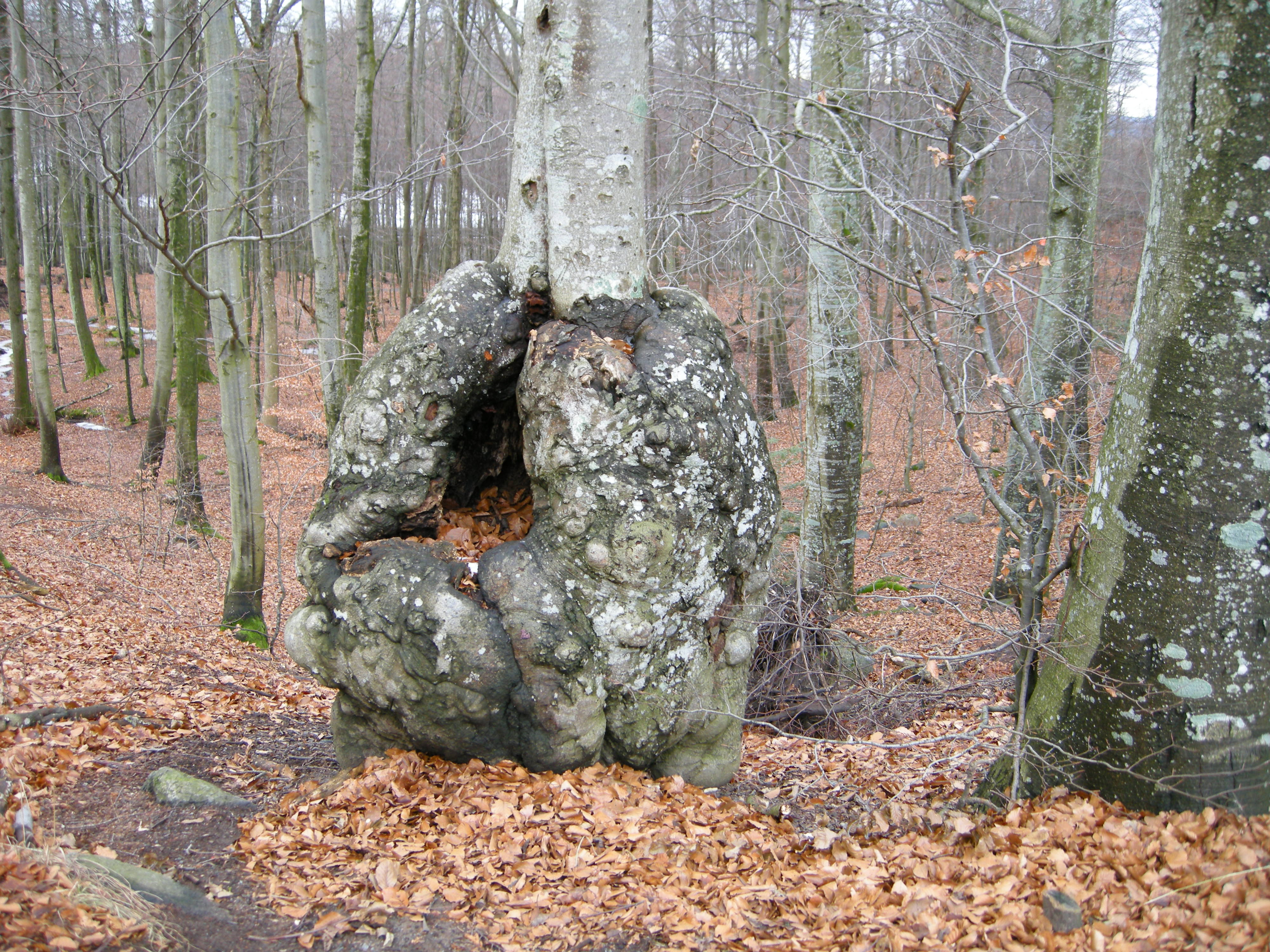
Norway - Winter in the beech forest in Larvik Municipality, Norway. Aside from conifers, black alder, white birch and elm are more common in the Sarmatic mixed forest.

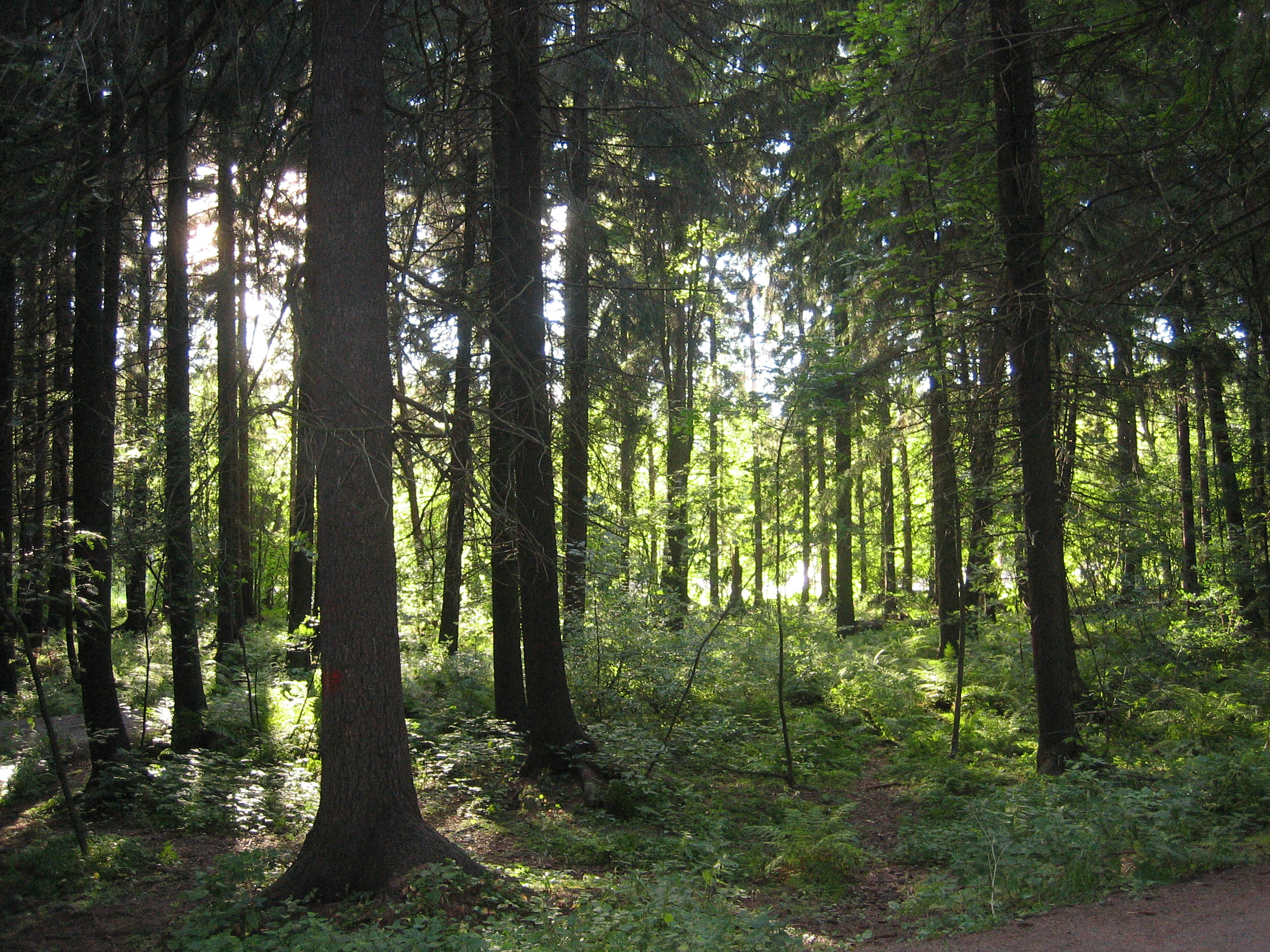
Coniferous trees in southernmost Finland dominate this Sarmatic mixed forest.

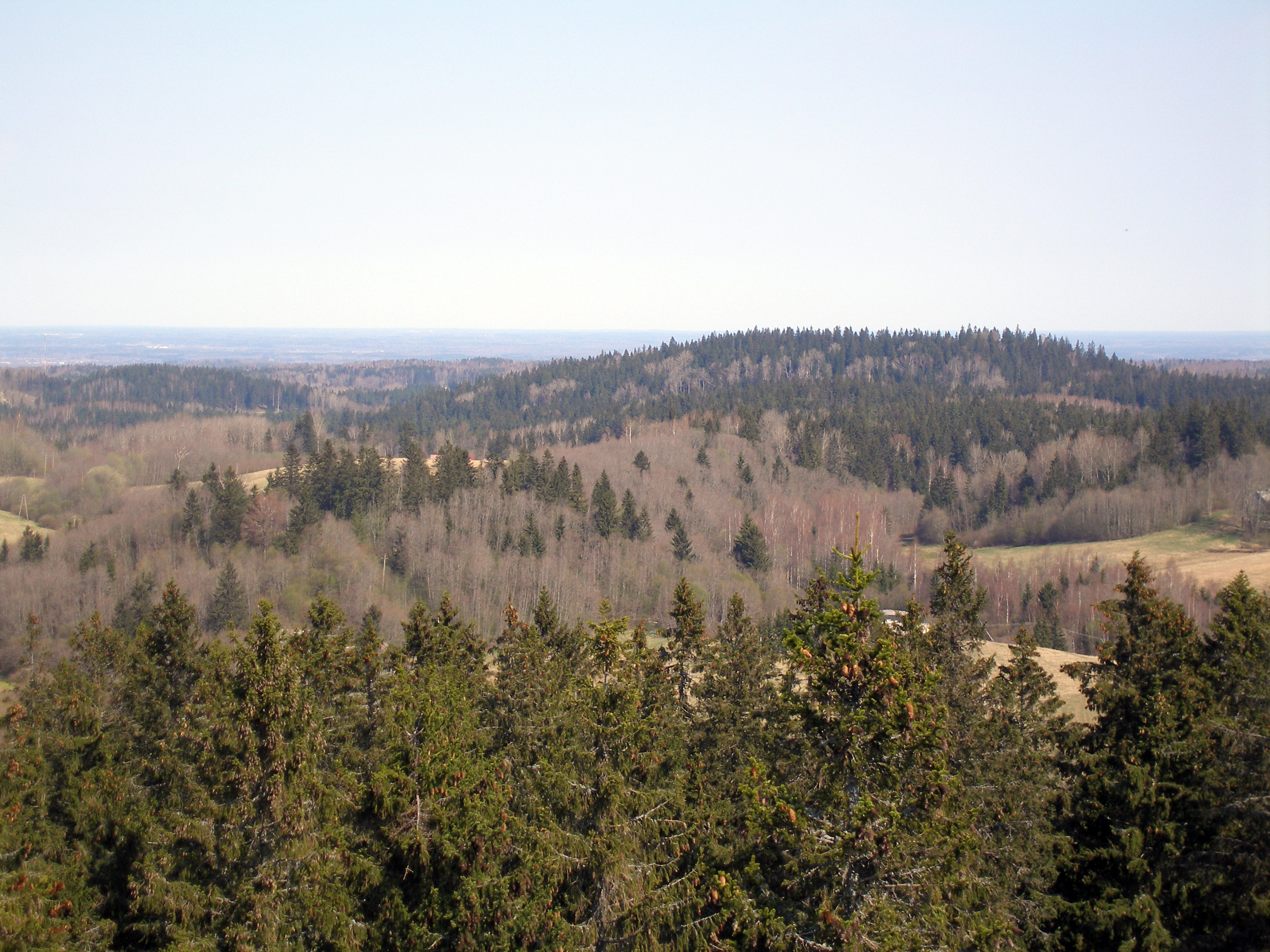
South Estonia - Deciduous and coniferous trees clearly differentiate on this springtime photo.
