= Northwest Russian–Novaya Zemlya tundra =

Ecoregion in Russia

Northwest Russian-Novaya Zemlya tundra
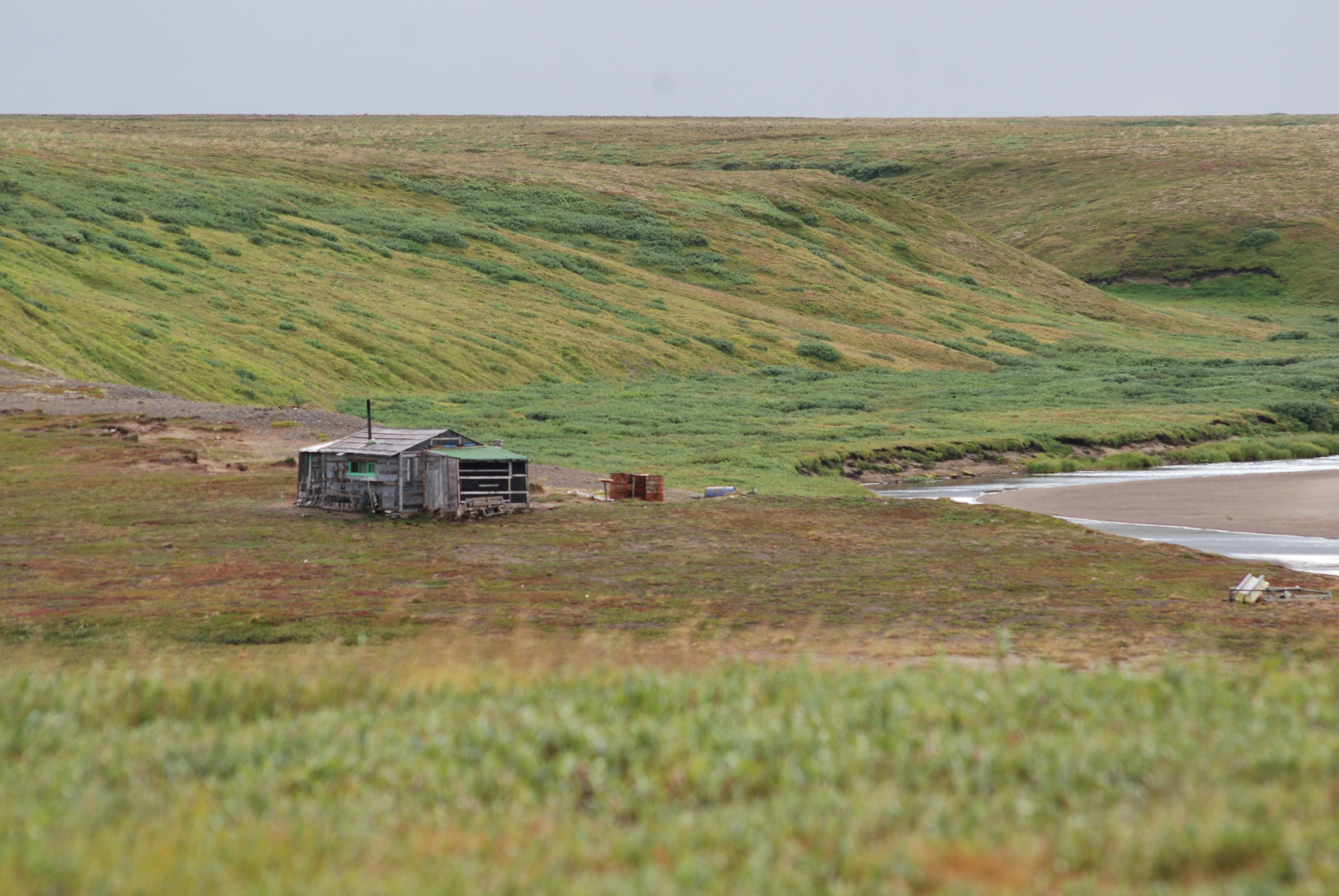
- Landscape on Kolguyev Island

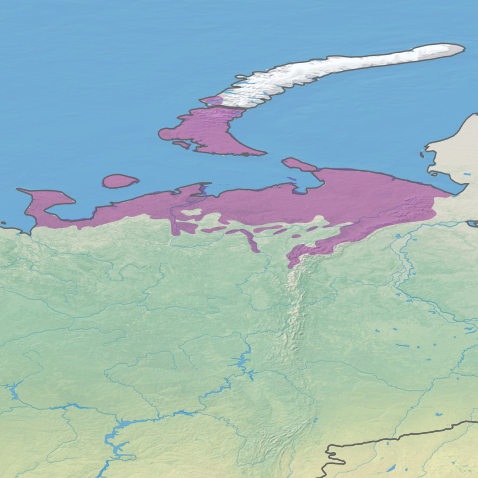
- Ecoregion territory (in purple)

Ecology
- Realm: Palearctic
- Biome: tundra

Geography
- Area: 284,122 km^{2} (109,700 mi^{2})
- Countries: Russia
- Coordinates: 68.25°N 57.25°E

The Northwest Russian-Novaya Zemlya tundra ecoregion (WWF ID: PA1108) is an ecoregion on the north coast of European Russia. It covers the southern shores of the White Sea (the Kanin Peninsula), the coast of the Barents Sea east to the Yamal Peninsula, the southern half of Novaya Zemlya, and numerous inlets and islands. The low tundra wetlands are important breeding grounds for waterfowl. The ecoregion is in the Palearctic realm, and the tundra biome. It has an area of 284,122 square kilometres (109,700 mi^{2}).

== Location and description ==
The ecoregion stretches 1,000 km across the northern coast of Russia. The terrain is mostly lowland tundra, with extensive marshes, lakes and wetlands. At the western end is the Kanin Peninsula, surrounded by the White Sea and with very sparse human habitation. About 100 km east of the Kanin Peninsula, and 100 km north of the coast, is Kolguyev Island. 100 km southeast of Kolguyev is the delta of the Pechora River and the Nenets Nature Reserve. Farther east is the Yugorsky Peninsula, and Yuzhny Island, the southern island of the Novaya Zemlya archipelago. The ecoregion ends in the east just short of the Ob River delta.

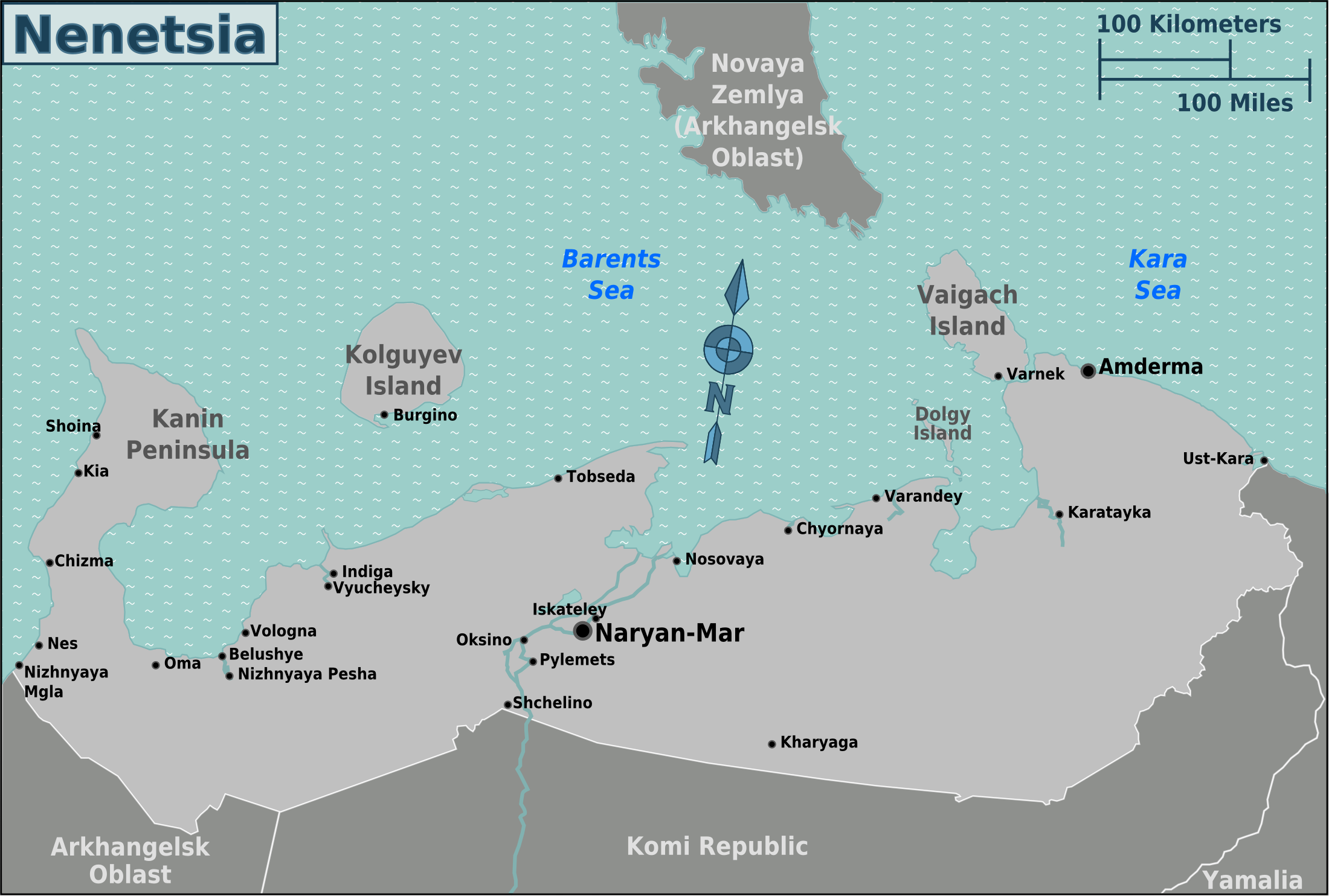
Map of Nenetsia, approximately the area of the ecoregion

== Climate ==
The region has a Humid continental climate - cool summer subtype (Koppen classification Dfc). This climate is characterized by high variation in temperature, both daily and seasonally; with long, cold winters and short, cool summers with no averaging over 22 °C (72 °F). Mean precipitation is about 460 mm/year. The mean temperature at the center of the ecoregion is −20 °C (−4 °F) in January, and 12.9 °C (55.2 °F) in July.

== Flora and fauna ==
The lowland tundra features extensive inland wetlands and meadows, with characteristic shrub-moss-lichen floral communities. A characteristic of the ecoregion is that the coastal meadows reach far inland.

During the summer, large populations of migratory geese, swans, ducks and other migratory birds inhabit the area for nesting. A population of the vulnerable Lesser white-fronted goose is found on the Kanin Peninsula.

== Protections ==
There is one significant nationally protected area in this ecoregion - the Nenets Nature Reserve, which includes the delta of the Pechora River.

== See also ==
- List of ecoregions in Russia
