= Usva (river) =

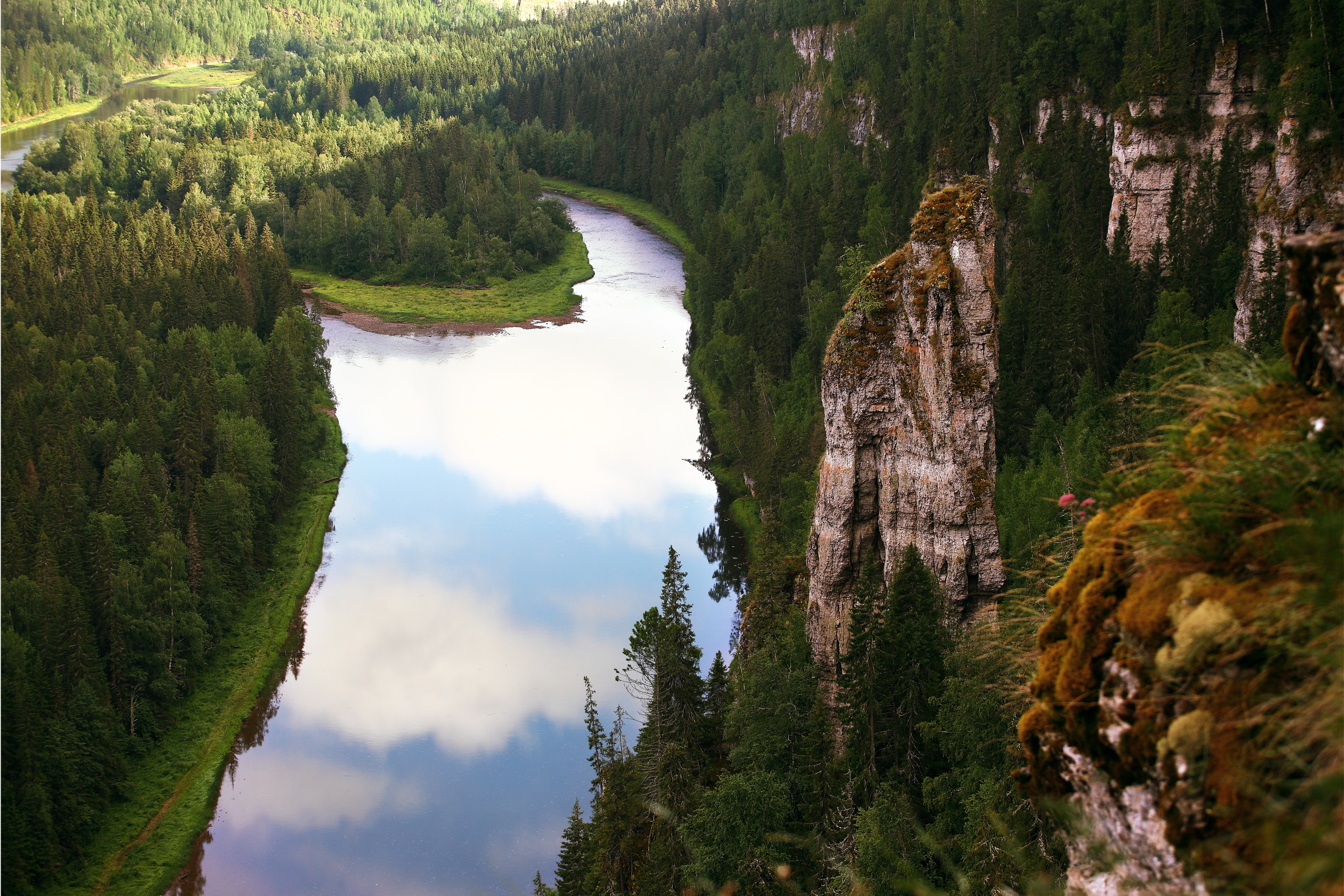

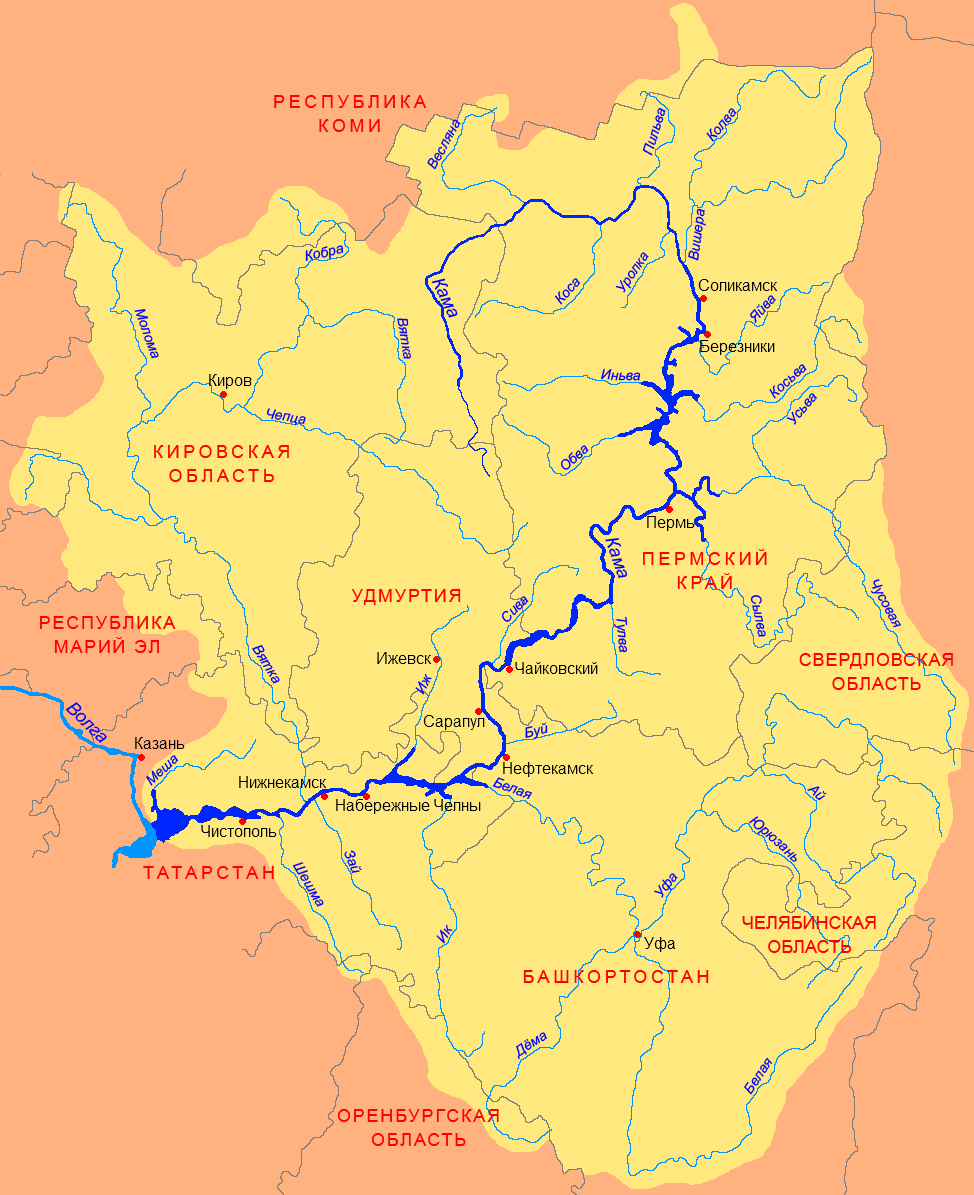
- Scheme of the Kama River Basin.

Physical characteristics
- Source
  - location: Middle Ural
- Mouth: Chusovaya
  - coordinates: 58°17′30″N 57°46′34″E
- Length: 266 km (165 mi)
- Basin size: 6,170 km^{2} (2,380 sq mi)
- Discharge
  - average: 30.8 m^{3}/s (1,090 cu ft/s)

Basin features
- Progression: Chusovaya→ Kama→ Volga→ Caspian Sea

The Usva (Russian: Усьва) is a river in Perm Krai in Russia, a right tributary of the Chusovaya (Kama basin). The river is 266 kilometres (165 mi) long, and its drainage basin covers 6,170 square kilometres (2,380 mi^{2}).

The Usva freezes up in the month of November and remains icebound until late April or early May. This is a lowland river for most of its course except upstream, where it has many rocks and rapids. Its banks are steep and rocky, covered with forests. The Usva crosses the Basegi range, which reaches 951 metres (3,120 ft) in elevation at North Baseg. There are seven localities on the banks of the river and some abandoned villages. The town of Chusovoy is at the confluence of the Usva and the Chusovaya rivers.

Main tributaries:

- Left: Vilva, Bolshaya Khariusnaya, Malaya Khariusnaya, Porozhnaya;
- Right: Suriya, Berezovka, Persha, Tulumovka.

== Etymology ==
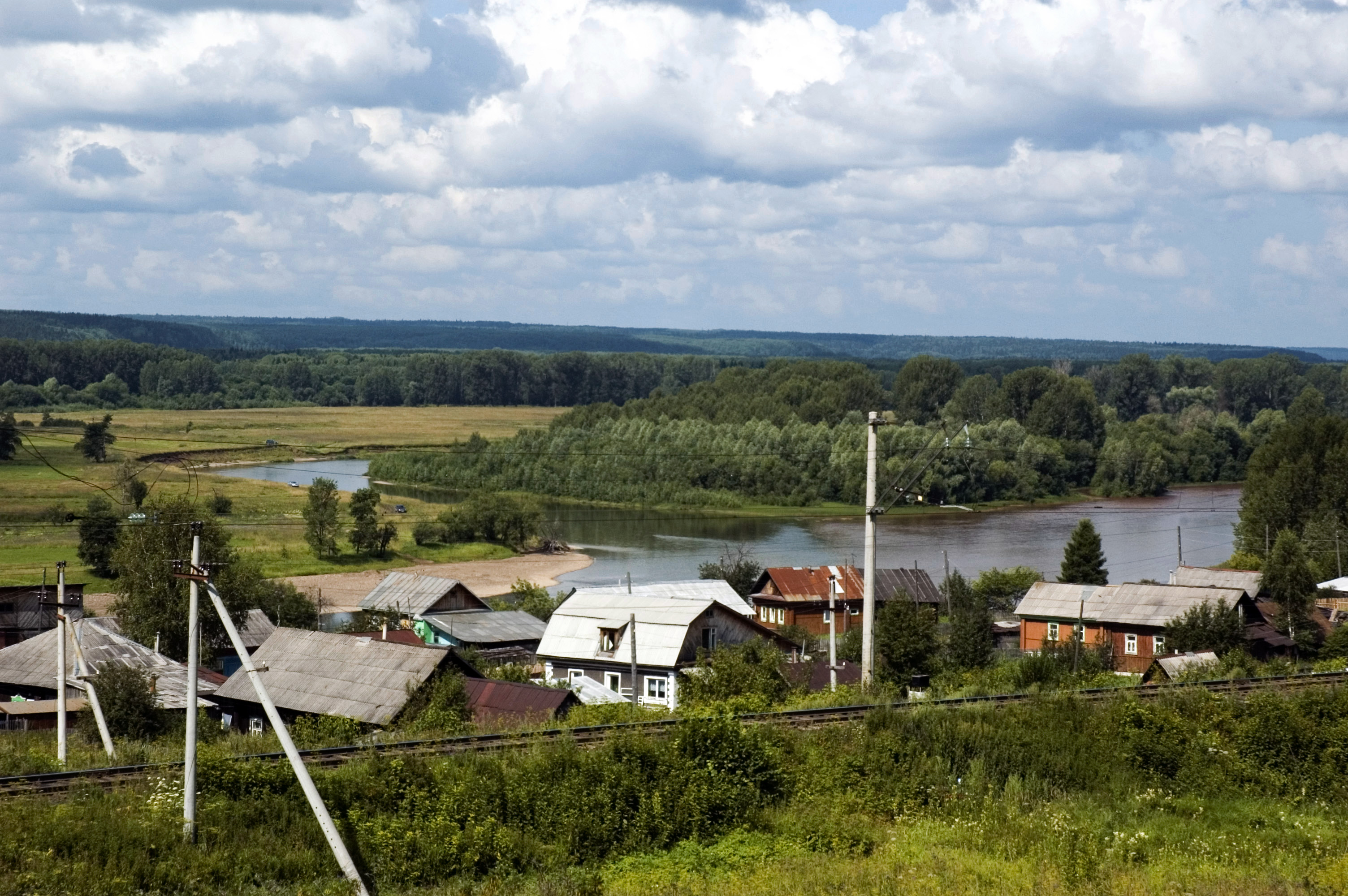
Vilva and Usva confluence

The most believable explanation of the name is that it is a composite of the Komi-Permyak words usyny (to fall) and va (water); then it can be translated as "falling water".
