= Vilva (river) =

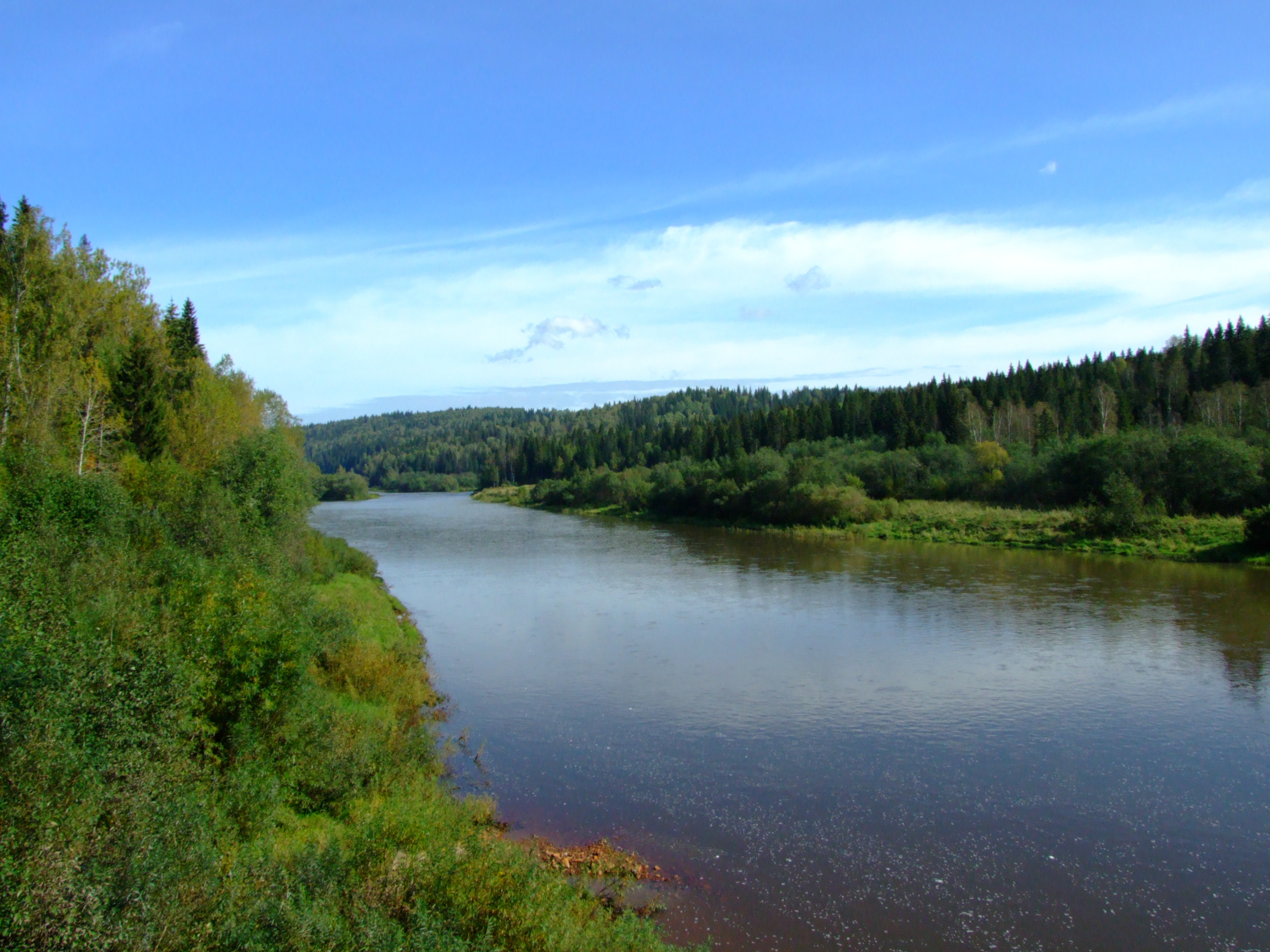
- Vilva River near Vizhai bridge

Physical characteristics
- Source
  - location: Middle Ural
- Mouth: Usva
  - coordinates: 58°19′18″N 57°47′20″E
- Length: 170 km (110 mi)
- Basin size: 3,020 km^{2} (1,170 sq mi)

Basin features
- Progression: Usva→ Chusovaya→ Kama→ Volga→ Caspian Sea

The Vilva (Russian: Вильва) is a river in Perm Krai, Russia, a left tributary of the Usva. It starts on the west foothills of the Ural, near the border with Sverdlovsk Oblast. It flows west and southwest, entering the Usva 4 kilometres (2 mi) from the larger river's mouth near the town of Chusovoy. The river is 170 kilometres (110 mi) long, and its drainage basin covers 3,020 square kilometres (1,170 mi^{2}).

== Main tributaries ==
- Left: Vizhay
- Right: North Rassokha, Bolshaya Myasnaya, Korostelevka, Bolshaya Porozhnaya, Tanchikha.

== Etymology ==
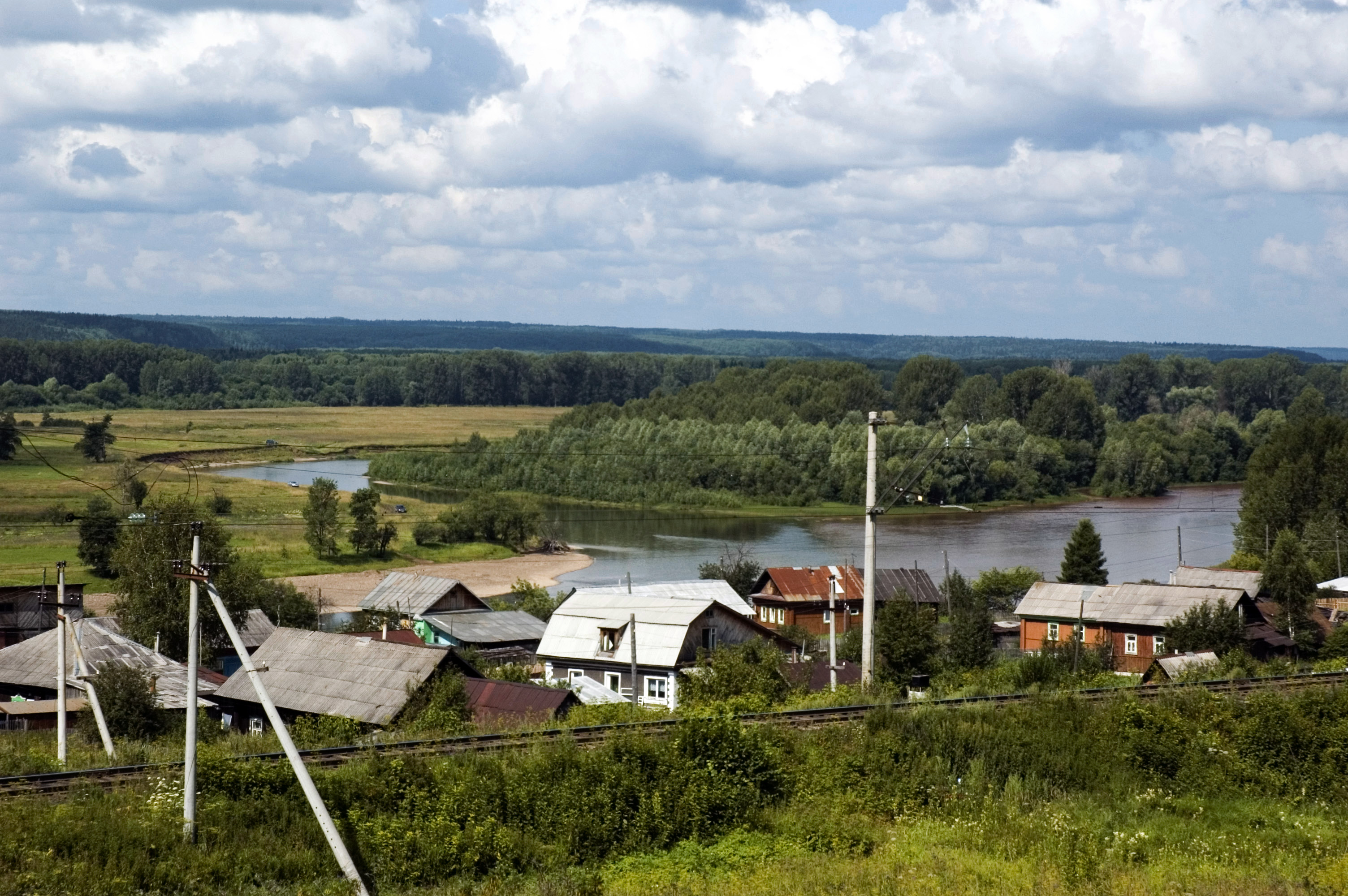
Vilva and Usva confluence

The river name is a composite of the Komi-Permyak words vil (new) and va (water).
