= Byrma =

Byrma may refer to several places in Russia:

- Byrma, Kishertsky District, Perm Krai, a village in Kishertsky District, Perm Krai
- Byrma, Permsky District, Perm Krai, a settlement in Permsky District, Perm Krai
- Byrma (river), a river in Perm Krai
