= Orda, Perm Krai =

Orda Орда
- Selo
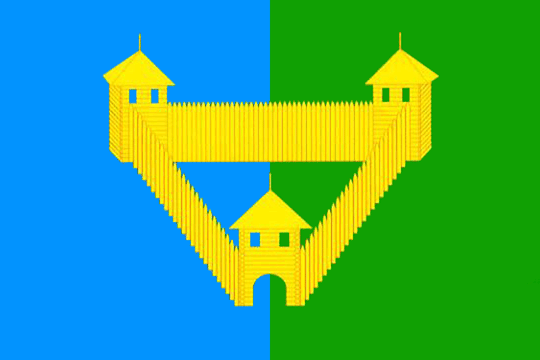
- Flag
- Interactive map of Orda
- Location of Orda Orda (Perm Krai)
- Coordinates: 57°11′44″N 56°55′12″E
- Country: Russia
- Federal subject: Perm Krai
- Administrative district: Ordinsky District
- First mentioned: 1662

Population (2010 Census)
  - Total: 5,375
  - Estimate (2021): 5,425 (+0.9%)

Administrative status
  - Capital of: Ordinsky District
- Time zone: UTC+5 (MSK+2)
- Postal code: 617500
- OKTMO ID: 57638428101

Orda (Russian: Орда) is a rural locality (a selo) and the administrative center of Ordinsky District of Perm Krai, Russia, located on the Kungur River (a tributary of the Iren River. Population: 5,375 (2010 census); 5,404 (2002 census); 4,850 (1989 Soviet census).

Orda was first mentioned in written sources in 1662. It has served as the administrative center of Ordinsky District since 1924, with a brief interruption in 1963–1965. It is named for the Ordynka River.

Near Orda is the only entrance to the Orda Cave, one of the longest underwater caves and the largest underwater gypsum cave in the world.
