= Ishteryaki =

Ishteryaki Иштеряки
- Selo
- Location within Perm Krai Location within Russia
- Coordinates: 56°49′N 56°57′E
- Country: Russia
- Region: Perm Krai
- District: Uinsky District
- Time zone: UTC+5:00

Ishteryaki (Russian: Иштеряки) is a rural locality (a selo) in Uinsky District, Perm Krai, Russia. The population was 517 as of 2010.

== Geography ==
Ishteryaki is located 32 km southeast of Uinskoye (the district's administrative centre) by road. Kharino Ozero is the nearest rural locality.
