= Kalinino, Kungursky District, Perm Krai =

Kalinino Калинино
- Selo
- Location within Perm Krai Location within Russia
- Coordinates: 57°19′N 56°19′E
- Country: Russia
- Region: Perm Krai
- District: Kungursky District
- Time zone: UTC+5:00

Kalinino (Russian: Калинино) is a rural locality (a selo) and the administrative center of Kalininskoye Rural Settlement, Kungursky District, Perm Krai, Russia. The population was 2,288 as of 2010. There are 28 streets.

== Geography ==
Kalinino is located 47 km southwest of Kungur (the district's administrative centre) by road. Andreyevka is the nearest rural locality.
