= Bym =

Bym Бым
- Selo
- Location within Perm Krai Location within Russia
- Coordinates: 57°25′N 56°19′E
- Country: Russia
- Region: Perm Krai
- District: Kungursky District
- Time zone: UTC+5:00

Bym (Russian: Бым) is a rural locality (a selo) in Troyelzhanskoye Rural Settlement, Kungursky District, Perm Krai, Russia. The population was 465 as of 2010. There are 14 streets.

== Geography ==
Bym is located 48 km west of Kungur (the district's administrative centre) by road. Rybinka is the nearest rural locality.
