= Uya (river) =

River in Perm Krai, Russia

Physical characteristics
- Mouth: Aspa
  - location: Uinskoye
  - coordinates: 56°53′15″N 56°35′36″E
- Length: 19 km (12 mi)

Basin features
- Progression: Aspa→ Iren→ Sylva→ Chusovaya→ Kama→ Volga→ Caspian Sea

The Uya or Bolshaya Uya (Russian: Уя) is a river in Perm Krai, Russia, a right tributary of the Aspa, which in turn is a tributary of the Iren. The river is 19 kilometres (12 mi) long. The main tributary is the Malaya Uya River (right).
