= Uinsky =

Uinsky (masculine), Uinskaya (feminine), or Uinskoye (neuter) may refer to:

- Uinsky District, a district of Perm Krai, Russia
- Uinskoye, a rural locality (a selo) in Perm Krai, Russia
