= Shadeyka =

Shadeyka Шадейка
- Settlement
- Location within Perm Krai Location within Russia
- Coordinates: 57°26′N 56°47′E
- Country: Russia
- Region: Perm Krai
- District: Kungursky District
- Time zone: UTC+5:00

Shadeyka (Russian: Шадейка) is a rural locality (a settlement) and the administrative center of Shadeyskoye Rural Settlement, Kungursky District, Perm Krai, Russia. The population was 1,205 as of 2010. There are 16 streets.

== Geography ==
Shadeyka is located 14km northwest of Kungur (the district's administrative centre) by road. Ludino is the nearest rural locality.
