= Bolshaya Gorevaya =

River in Perm Krai, Russia

Physical characteristics
- Mouth
  - location: Turka
- Length: 11 km (6.8 mi)

Basin features
- Progression: Turka→ Iren→ Sylva→ Chusovaya→ Kama→ Volga→ Caspian Sea

The Bolshaya Gorevaya (Russian: Большая Горевая) is a river in Perm Krai, Russia, a left tributary of Turka which in turn is a tributary of Iren. The river is 11 kilometres (7 mi) long.
