= Savlek =

River in Perm Krai, Russia

Physical characteristics
- Mouth: Turka
  - coordinates: 57°11′52″N 56°30′37″E
- Length: 17 km (11 mi)

Basin features
- Progression: Turka→ Iren→ Sylva→ Chusovaya→ Kama→ Volga→ Caspian Sea

The Savlek (Russian: Савлек) is a river in Perm Krai, Russia, a right tributary of the Turka, which in turn is a tributary of the Iren. The river is 17 kilometres (11 mi) long.
