= Bolshaya Rassokha =

River in Perm Krai, Russia

Physical characteristics
- Mouth
  - location: Bolshoy Ashap
- Length: 11 km (6.8 mi)

Basin features
- Progression: Bolshoy Ashap→ Iren→ Sylva→ Chusovaya→ Kama→ Volga→ Caspian Sea

The Bolshaya Rassokha (Russian: Большая Рассоха) is a river in Perm Krai, Russia, a right tributary of Bolshoy Ashap which in turn is a tributary of Iren. The river is 11 kilometres (7 mi) long.
