= Bartym =

Bartym Бартым
- Village
- Location within Perm Krai Location within Russia
- Coordinates: 57°39′N 57°21′E
- Country: Russia
- Region: Perm Krai
- District: Beryozovsky District
- Time zone: UTC+5:00

Bartym (Russian: Бартым) is a rural locality (a village) in Beryozovskoye Rural Settlement, Beryozovsky District, Perm Krai, Russia. The population was 55 as of 2010. There are 3 streets.

== Geography ==
Bartym is located on the Bartym River, 9 km northeast of Beryozovka (the district's administrative centre) by road. Kopchikovo is the nearest rural locality.

The Bartym (Russian: Бартым) is a river in Perm Krai, Russia, a left tributary of the Shakva, which in turn is a tributary of the Sylva. The river is 27 kilometres (17 mi) long.
