= Bymok =

River in Perm Krai, Russia

Physical characteristics
- Mouth
  - location: Bym
- Length: 20 km (12 mi)

Basin features
- Progression: Bym→ Iren→ Sylva→ Chusovaya→ Kama→ Volga→ Caspian Sea

The Bymok (Russian: Бымок) is a river in Perm Krai, Russia, a left tributary of the Bym, which in turn is a tributary of the Iren. The river is 20 kilometres (12 mi) long.
