= Klyuchyovka =

River in Perm Krai, Russia

Physical characteristics
- Mouth
  - location: Aspa
- Length: 11 km (6.8 mi)

Basin features
- Progression: Aspa→ Iren→ Sylva→ Chusovaya→ Kama→ Volga→ Caspian Sea

The Klyuchyovka (Russian: Ключевка) is a river in Perm Krai, Russia, a right tributary of the Aspa, which in turn is a tributary of the Iren. The river is 11 kilometres (7 mi) long.
