= Chyornaya Turka =

River in Perm Krai, Russia

Physical characteristics
- Mouth
  - location: Turka
- Length: 18 km (11 mi)

Basin features
- Progression: Turka→ Iren→ Sylva→ Chusovaya→ Kama→ Volga→ Caspian Sea

The Chyornaya Turka (Russian: Чёрная Турка) is a river in Perm Krai, Russia, a right tributary of the Turka, which in turn is a tributary of the Iren. The river is 18 kilometres (11 mi) long.
