= Natalya Avseenko =

Russian freediver

Natalya Anatoliyevna Avseenko
- Born: 13 February 1975 (age 51); Moscow
- Education: Moscow State University
- Occupation: free-diver Мастер Plavita Sadhana

Natalya Anatoliyevna Avseenko (Russian: Наталья Авсе́енко; born February 13, 1975) is a Russian freediver, former free diving world champion in the team competition in 2006 and 2008, featured in a photographic series by Viktor Lyagushkin illustrating the Orda Cave, a gypsum crystal cave underneath the western Ural Mountains.

== Biography ==
Natalya Avseenko is a world record holder and a world champion in freediving. She is the founder of her own freediving school "PlavitaWay”.

She has a PhD in Culturology from Moscow State University. She worked as an assistant professor at the Department of Linguistics and Intercultural Communication until 2007 at the Faculty of Foreign Languages of Moscow State University.

She has been freediving since April 2004; at first the trainings went under the guidance of Natalia Molchanova, and then independently. Diving was done with Lotta Erickson and Linda Paganelli. She is a world champion in freediving (2006, 2008), world record holder (diving with constant weight without fins, 57 meters, Bahamas, April 8, 2008).

== Scientific research ==
Natalia, together with scientists, took part in an experiment to study the language, echolocation and behavior of beluga whales in the White Sea. The possibilities of human survival in water under extreme conditions (in sea water - 2 °C) were also studied. Natalya swam and dived in the icy water, naked, holding her breath. During the experiment, she set a record for being under ice in ice water having a temperature of - 2 °C (salt water freezes at negative temperatures) - 10 minutes 40 seconds during the first hike. The documentary "On the edge" was filmed about this experiment by director Natalia Uglitskikh. Natalya was under water with an overhead environment for about 12 minutes, but with the possibility of one-time switching on in the breathing process. The entire project, titled Princess of Whales, was organized and documented by photographer Viktor Lyagushkin.

== Top scores ==
- Freediving World Champion (December 2006).
- World champion in freediving (September 2008).
- World record holder (April 2008).
- World champion in freediving at the VI (team) world championship (together with Natalia Molchanova and Olga Suryakova) in Sharm el-Sheikh, September 11, 2008.
- The results were recorded at the competitions in 2004–2008.
