= Gryaznukha (river) =

River in Perm Krai, Russia

Physical characteristics
- Mouth: Kungur
  - coordinates: 57°15′39″N 56°51′12″E
- Length: 19 km (12 mi)

Basin features
- Progression: Kungur→ Iren→ Sylva→ Chusovaya→ Kama→ Volga→ Caspian Sea

The Gryaznukha (Russian: Грязнуха) is a river in Perm Krai, Russia, a right tributary of the Kungur, which in turn is a tributary of the Iren. The river is 19 kilometres (12 mi) long.
