= Usekay =

River in Perm Krai, Russia

Physical characteristics
- Mouth: Aspa
  - coordinates: 56°51′45″N 56°20′51″E
- Length: 14 km (8.7 mi)

Basin features
- Progression: Aspa→ Iren→ Sylva→ Chusovaya→ Kama→ Volga→ Caspian Sea

The Usekay (Russian: Усекай) is a river in Perm Krai, Russia, a left tributary of the Aspa, which in turn is a tributary of the Iren. The river is 14 kilometres (9 mi) long.
