= Kurmakash =

River in Perm Krai, Russia

Kurmakash River

Physical characteristics
- Mouth
  - location: Syp River
- Length: 15 km (9.3 mi)

Basin features
- Progression: Syp→ Iren→ Sylva→ Chusovaya→ Kama→ Volga→ Caspian Sea

Kurmakash (Russian: Курмакаш) is a river in Perm Krai, Russia, a right tributary of the Syp River, which in turn is a tributary of the Iren River. The river is 15 kilometres (9 mi) long.
