= Ordinsky District =

Ordinsky District Ординский район (Russian)
- District
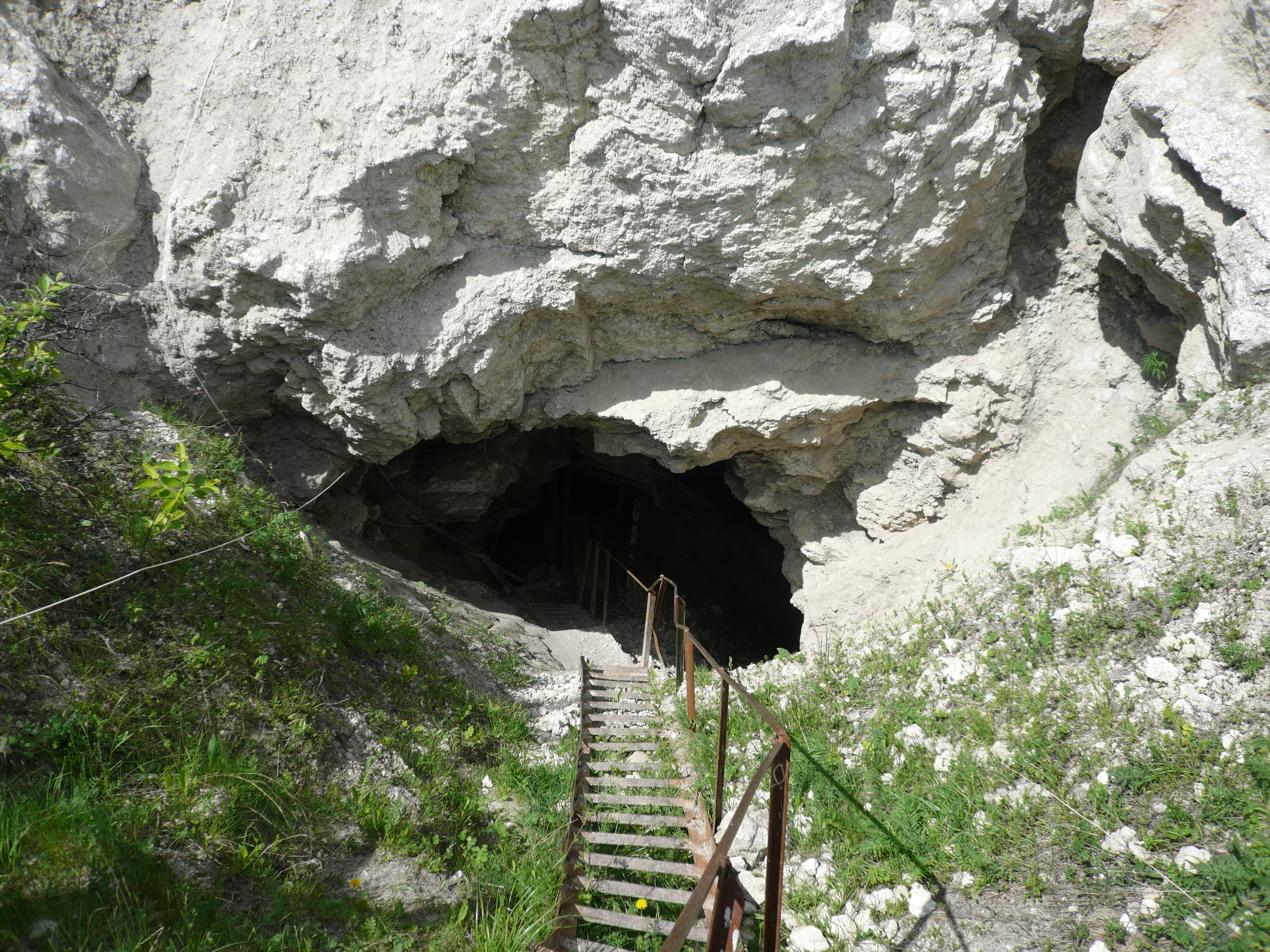
- The entrance to the Orda Cave, the largest underwater gypsum cave in the world located in Ordinsky District

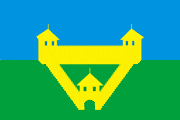
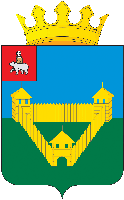
- Flag Coat of arms
- Location of Ordinsky District in Perm Krai
- Coordinates: 57°02′N 56°33′E
- Country: Russia
- Federal subject: Perm Krai
- Established: February 26, 1924 (first); January 12, 1965 (second)
- Administrative center: Orda

Area
  - Total: 1,418 km^{2} (547 sq mi)

Population (2010 Census)
  - Total: 15,605
  - Density: 11.00/km^{2} (28.50/sq mi)
  - Urban: 0%
  - Rural: 100%

Administrative structure
  - Inhabited localities: 45 rural localities

Municipal structure
  - Municipally incorporated as: Ordinsky Municipal District
  - Municipal divisions: 0 urban settlements, 5 rural settlements
- Time zone: UTC+5 (MSK+2)
- OKTMO ID: 57638000
- Website: http://orda.permarea.ru

Population of Ordinsky District
- 2010 Census: 15,605
- 2002 Census: 17,077
- 1989 Census: 17,576
- 1979 Census: 19,300

Ordinsky District (Russian: Орди́нский райо́н) is an administrative district (raion) of Perm Krai, Russia; one of the thirty-three in the krai. Municipally, it is incorporated as Ordinsky Municipal District. It is located in the southeast of the krai, mostly in the valley of the Iren River. The area of the district is 1,418 square kilometers (547 sq mi). Its administrative center is the rural locality (a selo) of Orda. As of the 2010 Census, the total population of the district was 15,605, with the population of Orda accounting for 34.4% of that number.

== History ==
The district was established on February 26, 1924 and became a part of Perm Oblast in October 1938. It was abolished on February 1, 1963 and restored on January 12, 1965.

== Demographics ==
Ethnic composition:

- Russians: 80.5%
- Tatars: 16.9%

== Economy ==
The economy of the district is based on agriculture and petroleum industry.

== Landmarks ==
The Orda Cave, one of the longest underwater caves and the largest underwater gypsum cave in the world, is located in Ordinsky District.

== Sources ==
- Законодательное собрание Пермской области. Закон №416-67 от 28 февраля 1996 г. «Об административно-территориальном устройстве Пермского края», в ред. Закона №504-ПК от 9 июля 2015 г. «О внесении изменений в Закон Пермской области "Об административно-территориальном устройстве Пермского края"». Вступил в силу с момента опубликования. Опубликован: "Звезда", №38, 12 марта 1996 г. (Legislative Assembly of Perm Oblast. Law #416-67 of February 28, 1996 On the Administrative-Territorial Structure of Perm Krai, as amended by the Law #504-PK of July 9, 2015 On Amending the Law of Perm Oblast "On the Administrative-Territorial Structure of Perm Krai". Effective as of the moment of publication.).
- Законодательное собрание Пермской области. Закон №1749-360 от 10 ноября 2004 г. «Об утверждении границ и о наделении статусом муниципальных образований Ординского района Пермского края», в ред. Закона №175-ПК от 7 марта 2013 г. «О внесении изменений в отдельные Законы Пермской области, Коми-Пермяцкого автономного округа об утверждении границ и о наделении статусом муниципальных образований Пермского края». Вступил в силу через десять дней со дня официального опубликования. Опубликован: "Бюллетень Законодательного Собрания и администрации Пермской области", №12, I часть, 9 декабря 2004 г. (Legislative Assembly of Perm Oblast. Law #1749-360 of November 10, 2004 On Establishing the Borders and on Granting the Status to the Municipal Formations of Ordinsky District of Perm Krai, as amended by the Law #175-PK of March 7, 2013 On Amending Various Laws of Perm Oblast, Komi-Permyak Autonomous Okrug on Establishing the Borders and on Granting the Status to the Municipal Formations of Perm Krai. Effective as of the day which is ten days following the day of the official publication.).
