= Bym (river) =

River in Perm Krai, Russia

Physical characteristics
- Mouth: Iren
  - coordinates: 57.2982°N 56.6719°E
- Length: 56 km (35 mi)
- Basin size: 327 km^{2} (126 sq mi)

Basin features
- Progression: Iren→ Sylva→ Chusovaya→ Kama→ Volga→ Caspian Sea

The Bym (Russian: Бым) is a river in Perm Krai, Russia, a left tributary of the Iren, which in turn is a tributary of the Sylva. The river is 56 kilometres (35 mi) long with a drainage basin of 327 square kilometres (126 mi^{2}). Main tributaries: Bymok (right).
