= Kungursky District =

Kungursky District Кунгурский район (Russian)
- District
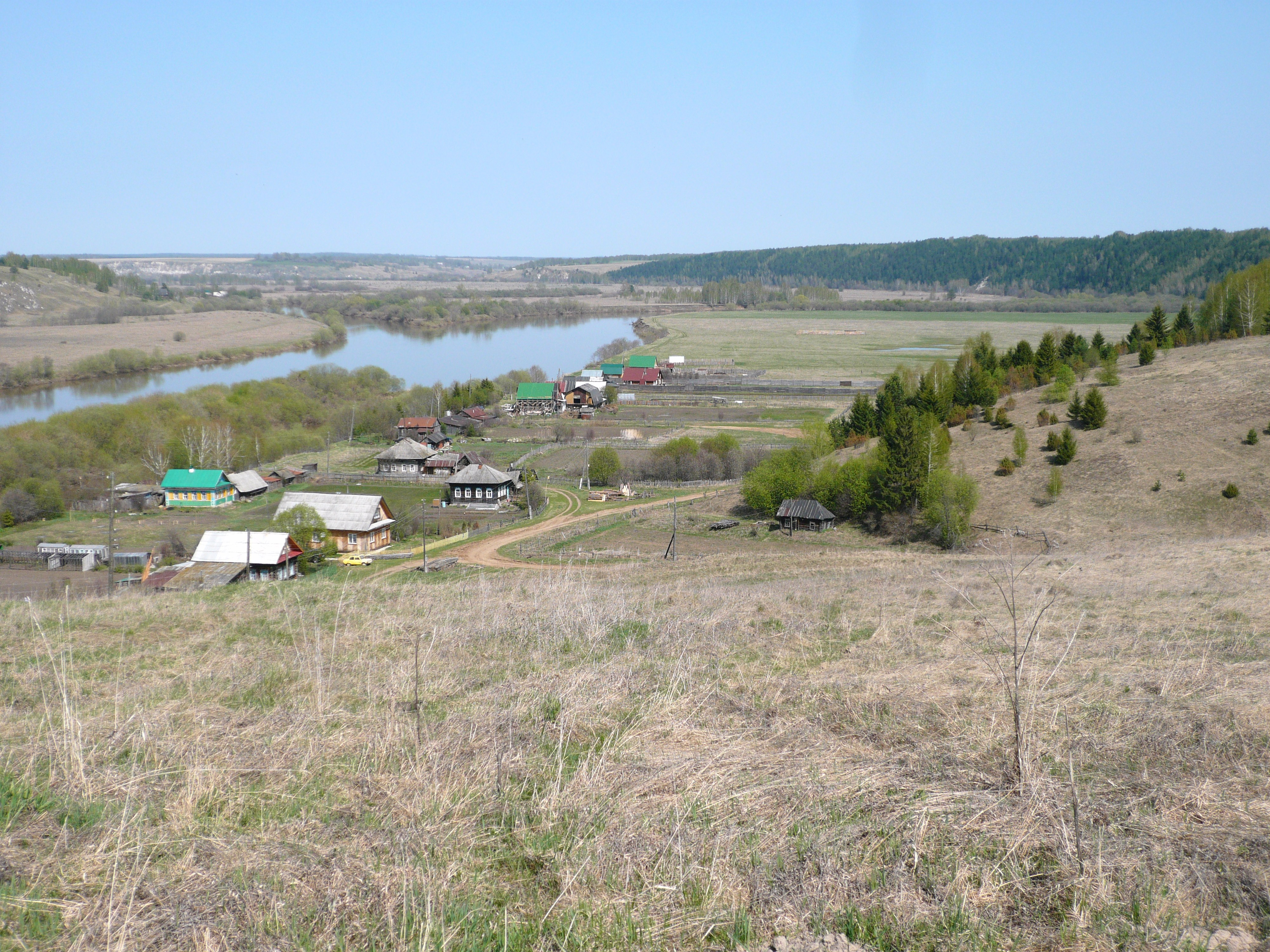
- Village Posad, Kungursky District

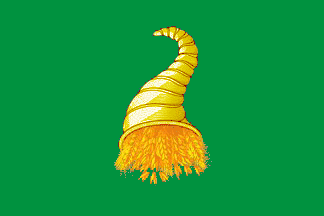
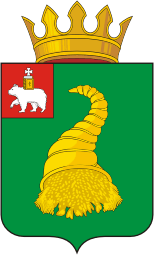
- Flag Coat of arms
- Location of Kungursky District in Perm Krai
- Coordinates: 57°26′02″N 56°56′55″E
- Country: Russia
- Federal subject: Perm Krai
- Established: November 1923
- Administrative center: Kungur

Area
  - Total: 4,416 km^{2} (1,705 sq mi)

Population (2010 Census)
  - Total: 42,450
  - Density: 9.613/km^{2} (24.90/sq mi)
  - Urban: 0%
  - Rural: 100%

Administrative structure
  - Inhabited localities: 240 rural localities

Municipal structure
  - Municipally incorporated as: Kungursky Municipal District
  - Municipal divisions: 0 urban settlements, 19 rural settlements
- Time zone: UTC+5 (MSK+2)
- OKTMO ID: 57630000
- Website: http://kungur.permarea.ru/

Kungursky District (Russian: Кунгурский райо́н) is an administrative district (raion) of Perm Krai, Russia; one of the thirty-three in the krai. Within the framework of municipal divisions, it is incorporated as Kungursky Municipal District. It is located in the southern central part of the krai and borders with the territories of the towns of krai significance of Chusovoy in the north and Lysva in the northeast, Beryozovsky, Suksunsky, and Kishertsky Districts in the east, Ordinsky and Uinsky Districts in the south, Bardymsky District in the southwest, Osinsky District in the west, and with Permsky District in the north. The area of the district is 4,416 square kilometers (1,705 sq mi). Its administrative center is the town of Kungur (which is not administratively a part of the district). Population: 42,450 (2010 census); 46,332 (2002 census); 47,949 (1989 Soviet census).

== Geography ==
Main rivers in the district include the Sylva, the Iren, the Shakva, and the Babka. There are deposits of gas, oil, anhydrite, and gypsum in the district. There are many caves in the district, of which the most famous is the Kungur Ice Cave—a popular tourist landmark. A significant portion of the district's territory is covered by forests. Climate is temperate continental.

== History ==
The district was established in November 1923. It became a part of Perm Oblast in October 1938.

== Administrative and municipal status ==
Within the framework of administrative divisions, Kungursky District is one of the thirty-three in the krai. The town of Kungur serves as its administrative center, despite being incorporated separately as a town of krai significance—an administrative unit with the status equal to that of the districts.

As a municipal division, the district is incorporated as Kungursky Municipal District. The town of krai significance of Kungur is incorporated separately from the district as Kungur Urban Okrug.

== Demographics ==
As of the 2002 Census, the predominant ethnicities were Russians at 87.8% and Tatars at 9.2%.

== Economy ==
The economy of the district is mostly based on agriculture, mining, and food industry.

== Notable residents ==
- Nikolai Saksonov (1923–2011), Russian weightlifter, born in Serga

== Sources ==
- Законодательное собрание Пермской области. Закон №416-67 от 28 февраля 1996 г. «Об административно-территориальном устройстве Пермского края», в ред. Закона №504-ПК от 9 июля 2015 г. «О внесении изменений в Закон Пермской области "Об административно-территориальном устройстве Пермского края"». Вступил в силу с момента опубликования. Опубликован: "Звезда", №38, 12 марта 1996 г. (Legislative Assembly of Perm Oblast. Law #416-67 of February 28, 1996 On the Administrative-Territorial Structure of Perm Krai, as amended by the Law #504-PK of July 9, 2015 On Amending the Law of Perm Oblast "On the Administrative-Territorial Structure of Perm Krai". Effective as of the moment of publication.).
- Законодательное собрание Пермской области. Закон №1987-436 от 27 декабря 2004 г. «Об утверждении границ и о наделении статусом муниципальных образований Кунгурского района Пермского края», в ред. Закона №273-ПК от 14 декабря 2013 г. «О внесении изменений в отдельные Законы Пермской области, Коми-Пермяцкого автономного округа, Пермского края». Вступил в силу через десять дней со дня официального опубликования. Опубликован: "Российская Газета", №2, 13 января 2005 г. (Legislative Assembly of Perm Oblast. Law #1987-436 of December 27, 2004 On Establishing the Borders and on Granting the Status to the Municipal Formations of Kungursky District of Perm Krai, as amended by the Law #273-PK of December 14, 2013 On Amending Various Laws of Perm Oblast, Komi-Permyak Autonomous Okrug, Perm Krai. Effective as of the day which is ten days following the day of the official publication.).
- Законодательное собрание Пермской области. Закон №1769-367 от 10 ноября 2004 г. «Об утверждении границ и о наделении статусом муниципального образования "Город Кунгур" Пермского края», в ред. Закона №499-ПК от 16 октября 2009 г «О внесении изменений в отдельные законодательные акты Пермской области и Коми-Пермяцкого автономного округа». Вступил в силу через десять дней со дня официального опубликования. Опубликован: "Бюллетень Законодательного Собрания и администрации Пермской области", №12, I часть, 9 декабря 2004 г. (Legislative Assembly of Perm Oblast. Law #1769-367 of November 10, 2004 On Establishing the Borders and on Granting the Status to the Municipal Formation of the "Town of Kungur" of Perm Krai, as amended by the Law #499-PK of October 16, 2009 On Amending Various Legislative Acts of Perm Oblast and Komi-Permyak Autonomous Okrug. Effective as of the day which is ten days following the day of the official publication.).
