= Byrma (river) =

River in Perm Krai, Russia

Physical characteristics
- Mouth
  - location: Turka
- Length: 44 km (27 mi)

Basin features
- Progression: Turka→ Iren→ Sylva→ Chusovaya→ Kama→ Volga→ Caspian Sea

The Byrma (Russian: Бырма) is a river in Perm Krai, Russia, a left tributary of the Turka which in turn is a tributary of the Iren. The river is 44 kilometres (27 mi) long.
