= Bolshoy Ashap =

River in Perm Krai, Russia

Physical characteristics
- Mouth
  - location: Iren
- Length: 39 km (24 mi)

Basin features
- Progression: Iren→ Sylva→ Chusovaya→ Kama→ Volga→ Caspian Sea

The Bolshoy Ashap (Russian: Большой Ашап) is a river in Perm Krai, Russia, a left tributary of Iren which in turn is a tributary of Sylva. The river is 39 kilometres (24 mi) long. Main tributaries: Bolshaya Rassokha (right).
