= Kungur Ice Cave =

Cave in Perm Krai, Russia

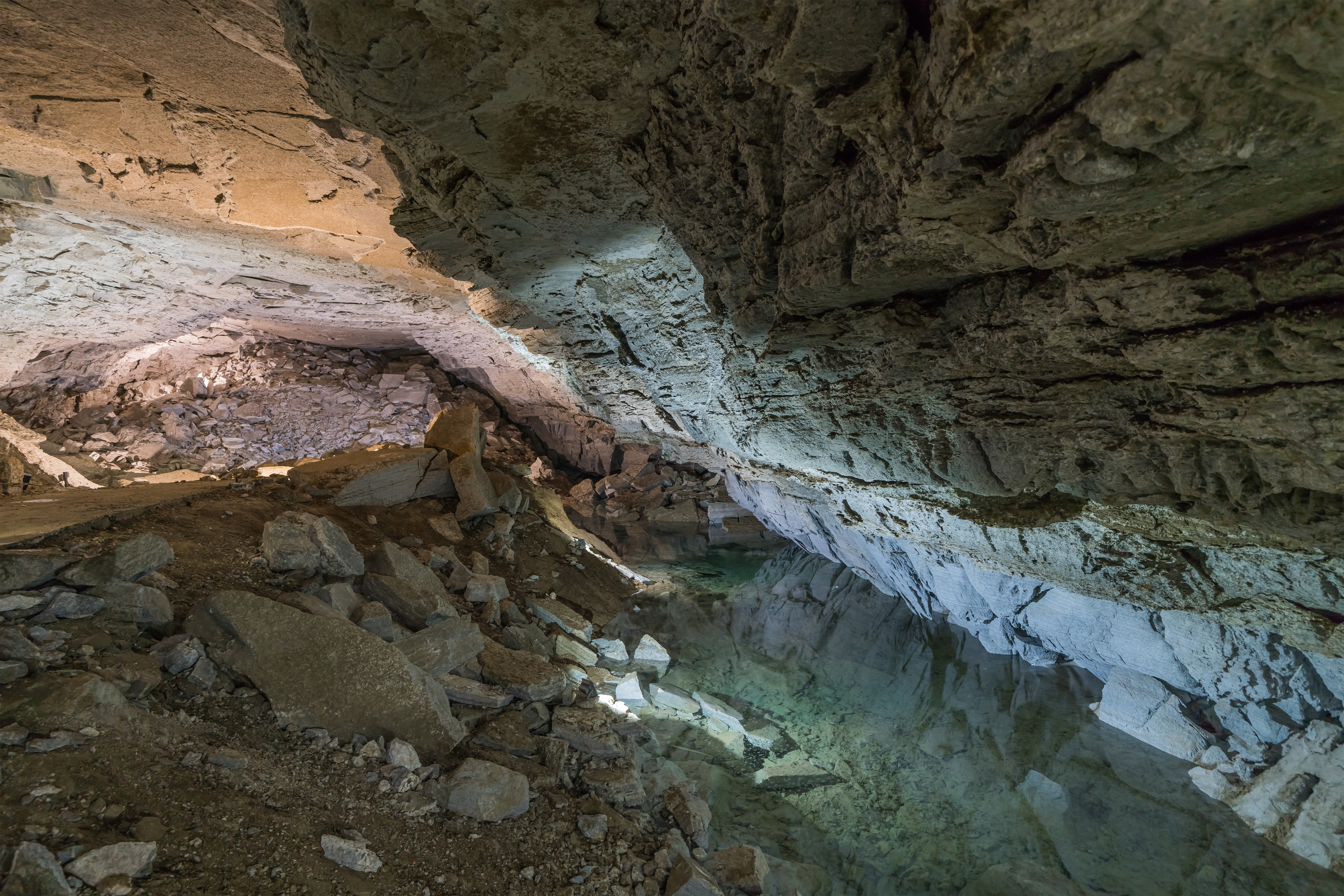
- The Giant Grotto in Kungur Ice Cave

- Location within Perm Krai Location within Russia
- Interactive map of Kungur Ice Cave
- Location: Kungur, Perm Krai, Russia
- Nearest city: Kungur
- Coordinates: 57°26′27″N 57°00′21″E

Kungur Ice Cave is a karst cave located in the Urals, near the town Kungur in Perm Krai, Russia, on the right bank of the Sylva River. The cave is noted for its ice formations and is a popular tourist landmark.

== History and archaeology ==
Kungur Ice Cave has been known since 1703, when Peter the Great issued the decree sending a well-known geographer Semyon Remezov from Tobolsk in Kungur. He worked out the Uyezd plan and made the first sketch of the cave.

The cave has been an excursion site since 1914, and it is equipped with three tour routes of different length:

1. The examination of a large excursion ring (classic route) covers 1.5 km (0.93 mi) and takes around 1 hour and 20 min
2. The second is 1.8 km (1.1 mi) and takes 1 hour 40 min
3. The third is the biggest, 2 km (1.2 mi) and around 1.5 hour. On this tour, there is a laser show and the route is more difficult.

One hundred thousand visitors come each year, and over five million people have been to the cave since it opened.

In the eastern part of "The Ice Mountain" there are two sites of ancient settlements from the 7th-9th centuries, relating to Lomovatov culture. Yermakov's site of ancient settlement has been known since the 19th century.

== Myth and stories ==
Inside the cave there is a set of narrow stone steps called "the female tears". The name comes from a story, that a long time ago a foreign princess tripped and fell on them. After she returned home she got married. Since then, it is said that if a woman falls down on these steps she will get married soon.

== Gallery ==
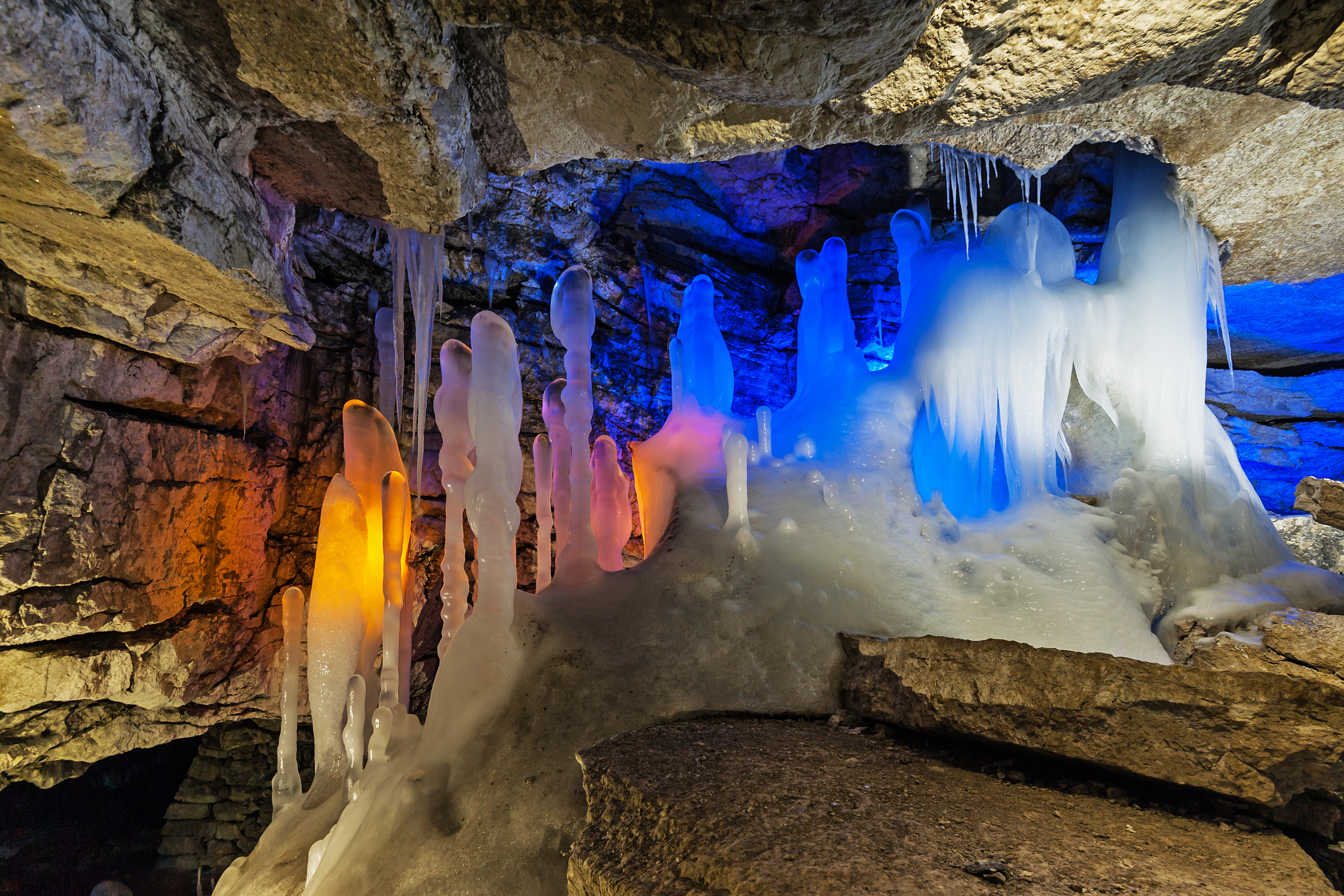
Ice formations in winter

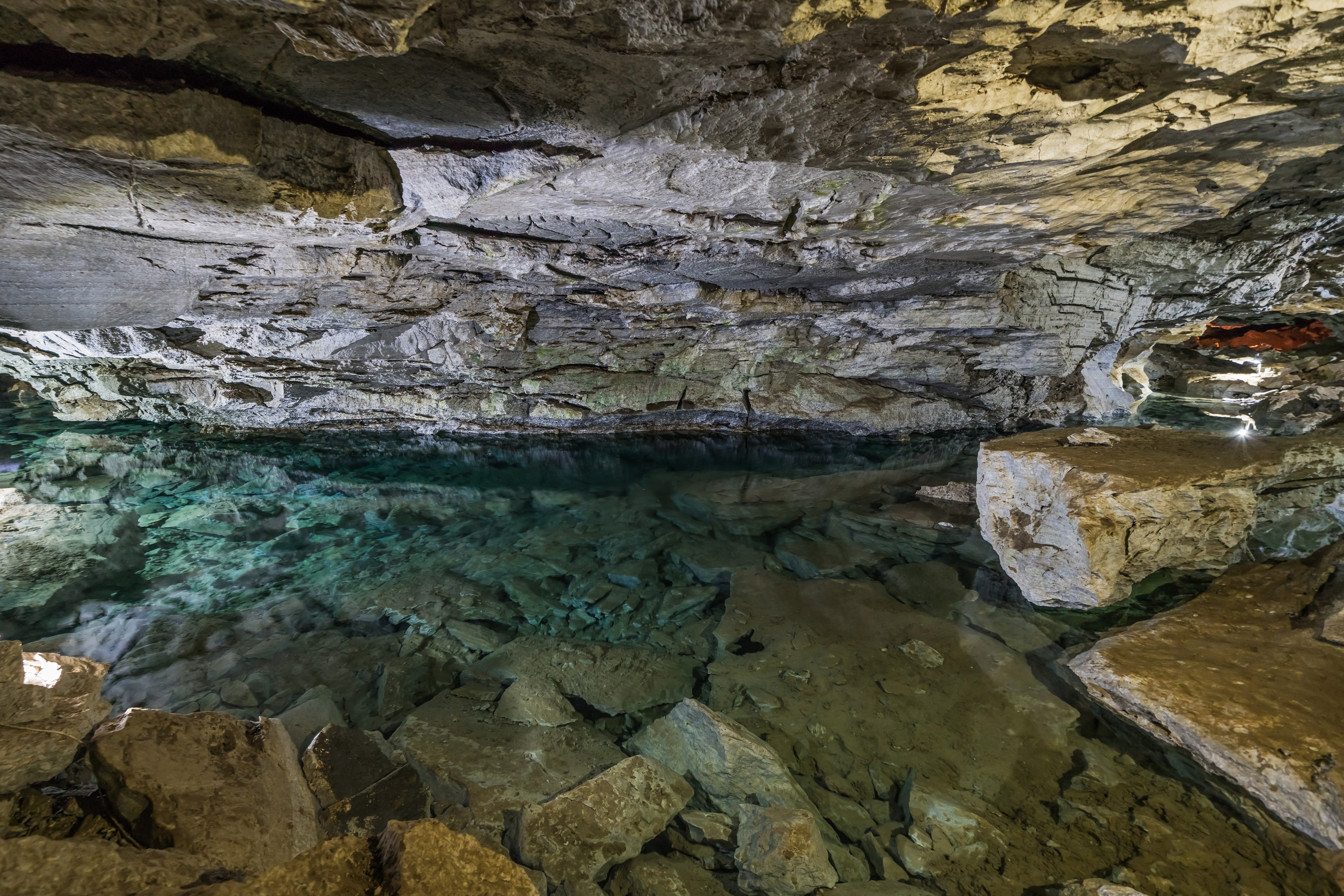
Long Grotto: underground lake

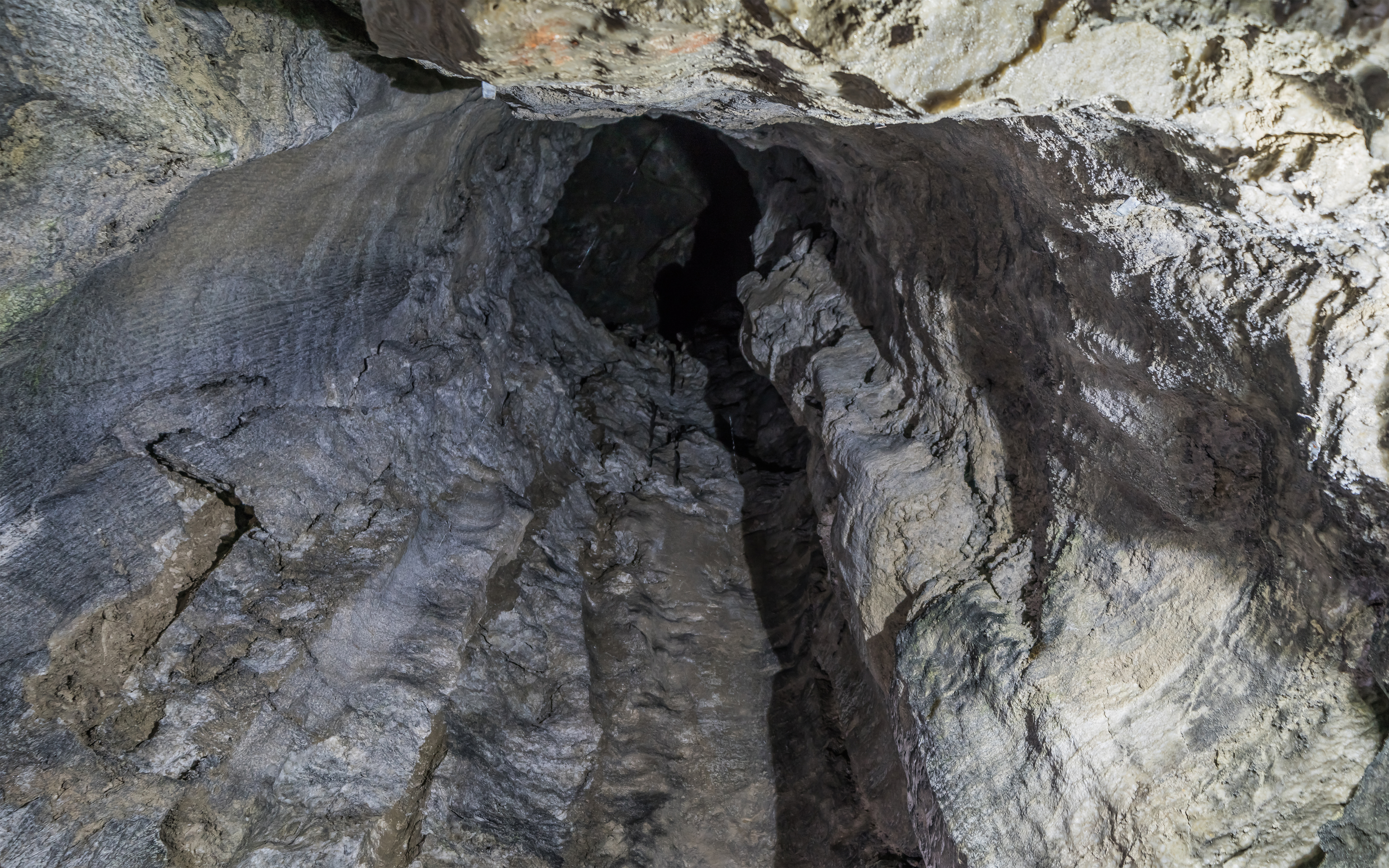
Ethereal Grotto: vertical "Organ Pipe" formation

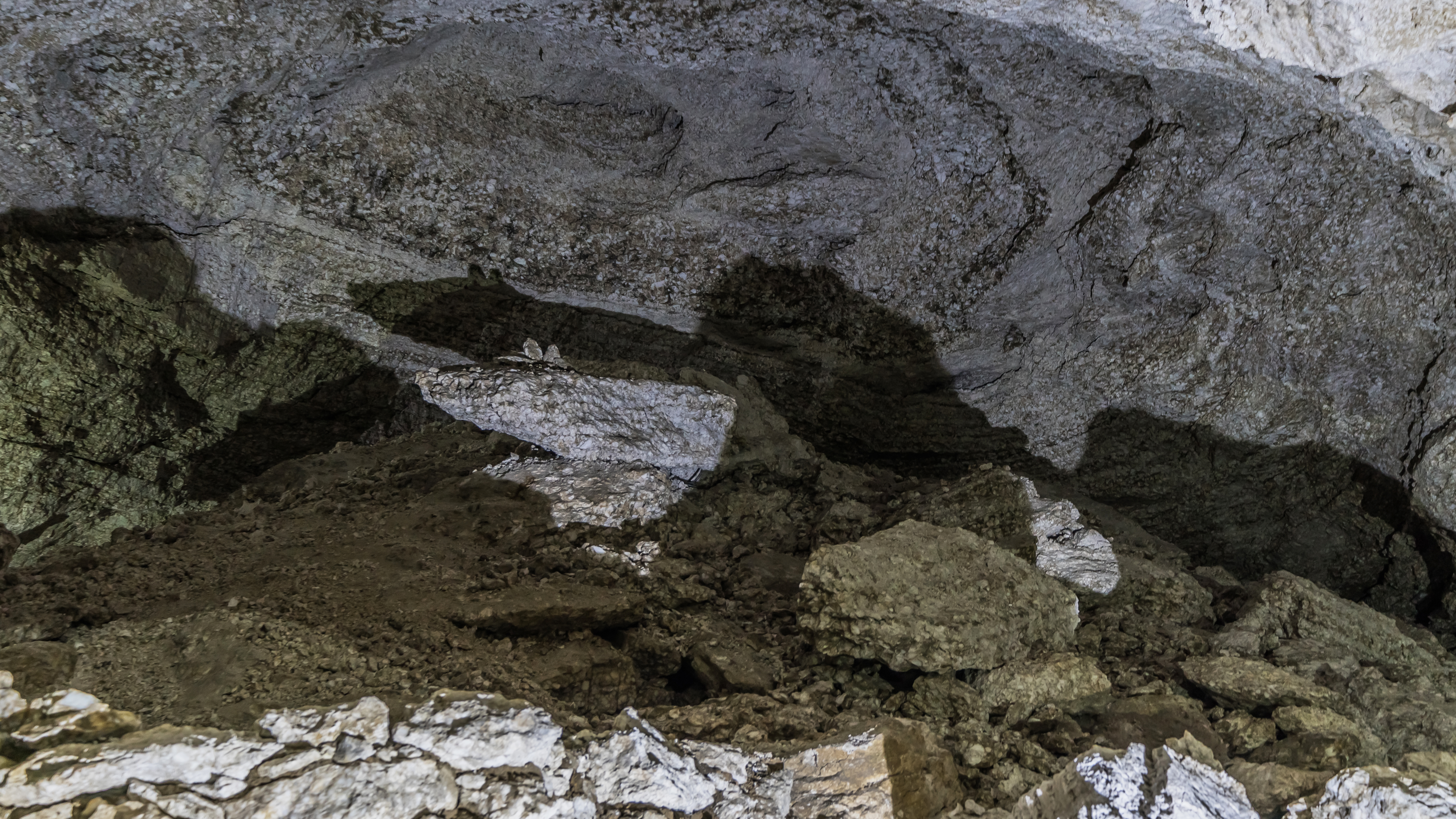
Tower Grotto: Mouse-like formation

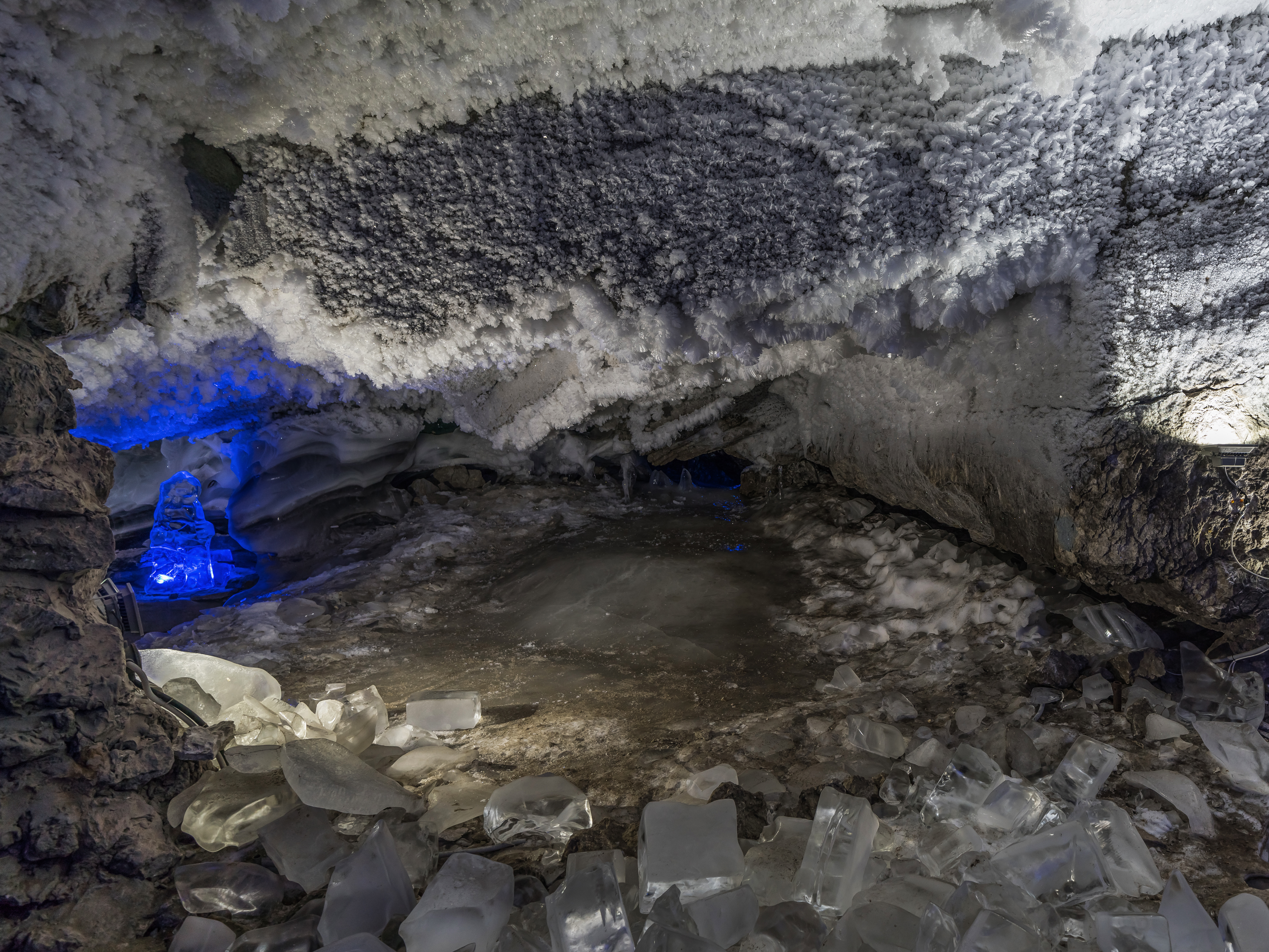
Diamond (aka Polar) Grotto: frost and icicles even during summer

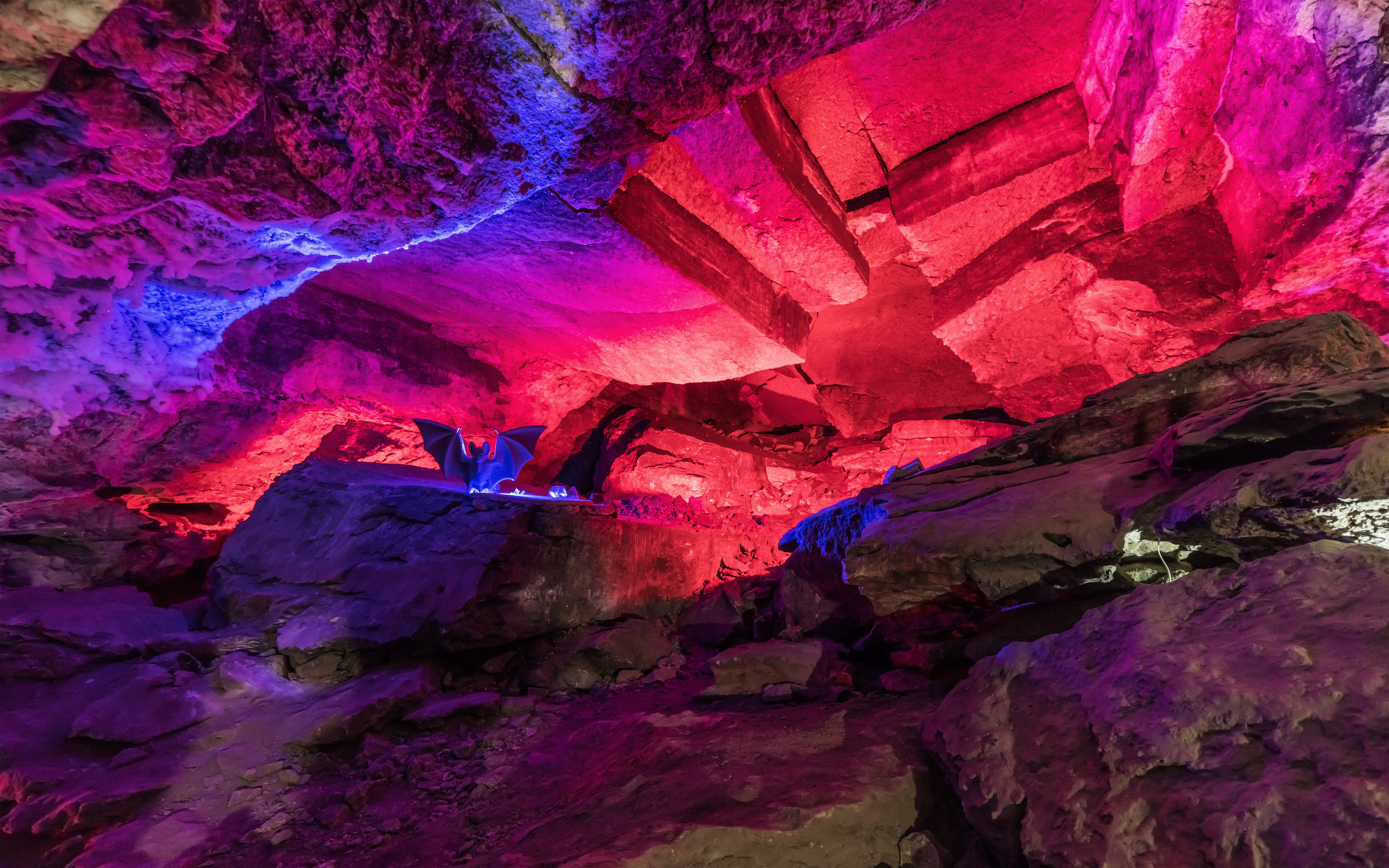
Dante Grotto: natural "ceiling blocks"
