= Uyas =

River in Perm Krai, Russia

Physical characteristics
- Mouth: Iren
  - coordinates: 56°37′51″N 56°50′36″E
- Length: 27 km (17 mi)

Basin features
- Progression: Iren→ Sylva→ Chusovaya→ Kama→ Volga→ Caspian Sea

The Uyas (Russian: Уяс) is a river in Perm Krai, Russia, a left tributary of the Iren, which in turn is a tributary of the Sylva. The river is 27 kilometres (17 mi) long.
