= Maly Ashap =

River in Perm Krai, Russia

Physical characteristics
- Mouth
  - location: Iren
- Length: 25 km (16 mi)

Basin features
- Progression: Iren→ Sylva→ Chusovaya→ Kama→ Volga→ Caspian Sea

The Maly Ashap (Russian: Малый Ашап) is a river in Perm Krai, Russia, a left tributary of the Iren, which in turn is a tributary of the Sylva. The Maly Ashap is 25 kilometres (16 mi) long.
