= Uinsky District =

Uinsky District Уинский район (Russian)
- District
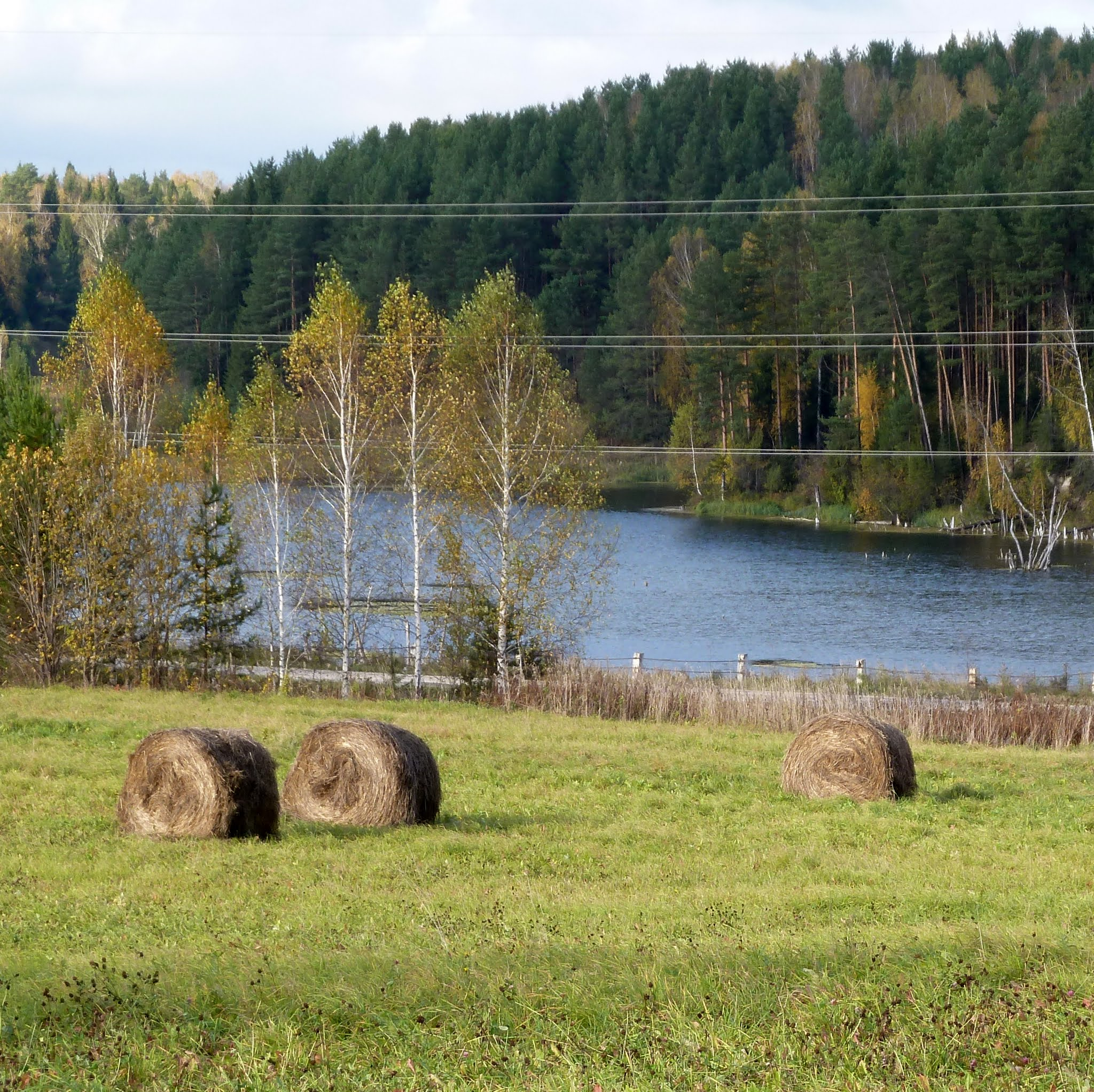
- Landscape in Uinsky District

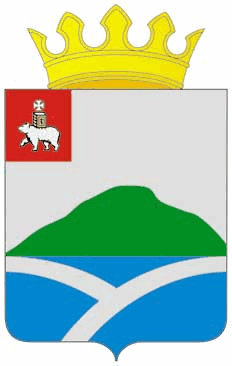
- Flag Coat of arms
- Location of Uinsky District in Perm Krai
- Coordinates: 56.844°N 56.532°E
- Country: Russia
- Federal subject: Perm Krai
- Established: September 15, 1926 (first), January 25, 1935 (second), December 30, 1966 (third)
- Administrative center: Uinskoye

Area
  - Total: 1,555 km^{2} (600 sq mi)

Population (2010 Census)
  - Total: 11,440
  - Density: 7.357/km^{2} (19.05/sq mi)
  - Urban: 0%
  - Rural: 100%

Administrative structure
  - Inhabited localities: 42 rural localities

Municipal structure
  - Municipally incorporated as: Uinsky Municipal District
  - Municipal divisions: 0 urban settlements, 7 rural settlements
- Time zone: UTC+5 (MSK+2)
- OKTMO ID: 57652000
- Website: http://www.uinsk.ru/

Uinsky District (Russian: Уинский райо́н) is an administrative district (raion) of Perm Krai, Russia; one of the thirty-three in the krai. Municipally, it is incorporated as Uinsky Municipal District. It is located in the south of the krai. The area of the district is 1,555 square kilometers (600 sq mi). Its administrative center is the rural locality (a selo) of Uinskoye. Population: 11,440 (2010 census); 13,360 (2002 census); 14,131 (1989 Soviet census). The population of Uinskoye accounts for 37.6% of the district's total population.

== Geography ==
Main rivers of the district are the Iren and its tributaries the Syp, the Aspa, and the Teles.

== History ==
The district was established on September 15, 1926. It was abolished between June 10, 1931 and January 25, 1935 and then again between February 1, 1963 and December 30, 1966.

== Demographics ==
Ethnic composition:

- Russians: 63.9%
- Tatars: 33.4%

== Economy ==
The economy of the district is based on agriculture, forestry, timber, and food industry.

== Sources ==
- Законодательное собрание Пермской области. Закон №416-67 от 28 февраля 1996 г. «Об административно-территориальном устройстве Пермского края», в ред. Закона №504-ПК от 9 июля 2015 г. «О внесении изменений в Закон Пермской области "Об административно-территориальном устройстве Пермского края"». Вступил в силу с момента опубликования. Опубликован: "Звезда", №38, 12 марта 1996 г. (Legislative Assembly of Perm Oblast. Law #416-67 of February 28, 1996 On the Administrative-Territorial Structure of Perm Krai, as amended by the Law #504-PK of July 9, 2015 On Amending the Law of Perm Oblast "On the Administrative-Territorial Structure of Perm Krai". Effective as of the moment of publication.).
- Законодательное собрание Пермской области. Закон №1870-403 от 9 декабря 2004 г. «Об утверждении границ и о наделении статусом муниципальных образований Уинского района Пермского края», в ред. Закона №175-ПК от 7 марта 2013 г. «О внесении изменений в отдельные Законы Пермской области, Коми-Пермяцкого автономного округа об утверждении границ и о наделении статусом муниципальных образований Пермского края». Вступил в силу через десять дней со дня официального опубликования. Опубликован: "Российская газета", №283, 22 декабря 2004 г. (Legislative Assembly of Perm Oblast. Law #1870-403 of December 9, 2004 On Establishing the Borders and on Granting the Status to the Municipal Formations of Uinsky District of Perm Krai, as amended by the Law #175-PK of March 7, 2013 On Amending Various Laws of Perm Oblast, Komi-Permyak Autonomous Okrug on Establishing the Borders and on Granting the Status to the Municipal Formations of Perm Krai. Effective as of the day which is ten days following the day of the official publication.).
