= Viktor Lyagushkin =

Russian photographer

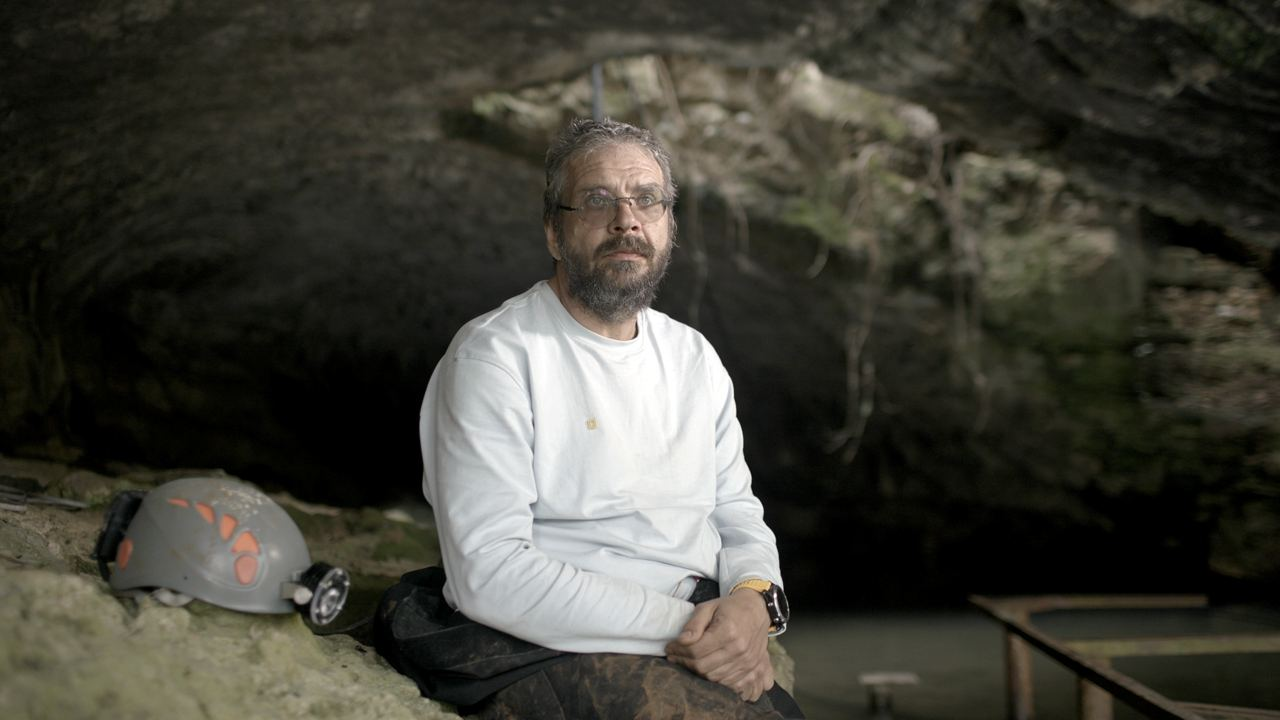
- Viktor Lyagushkin in April 2024 near the Prometheus Cave in Georgia.
- Born: Viktor Nikolaevich Leushin; March 26, 1971 (age 55); Moscow
- Occupation: Photographer
- Known for: Underwater photography, Cave photography
- Website: phototeam.pro

Lyagushkin has an explosion of curly hair on his head, Lennon-style glasses, and a habit of responding with the word 'croak'.

— Viktor Konoshevich, correspondent for the online magazine Bird-In-Flight.

Viktor Nikolaevich Lyagushkin (real last name is Leushin; born on March 26, 1971, in Moscow) is a Russian photographer known for his underwater and cave photography expertise. He is a regular contributor to National Geographic Magazine and a member of the Russian Geographical Society.

== Biography ==
Viktor Lyagushkin was born into a military family and spent his childhood with his parents in Czechoslovakia. He is a trained theatre set designer and initially worked as a designer for illustrated magazines. Since 1998, he has pursued a photography career, developing a particular interest in underwater photography starting in 2003. In 2010, he won the 4th Golden Turtle photo contest in the Underwater World category with his work "Scarlet Lips of the Gentle Sea Anemone".

In 2011, Viktor Lyagushkin conceived and executed the art project "Princess of Whales", which involved a unique photo shoot beneath the ice of the White Sea. The project featured Natalya Avseenko, a two-time world champion in freediving, as the model. Avseenko performed nude dives alongside beluga whales, symbolizing her defenselessness and the openness to the natural world. The film "Ceiling", directed by Natalya Uglitskikh and showcasing this project, was awarded the best documentary film at the 5th All-Russian Festival of Auteur Short Films "Artkino".

In 2012, the photographer received notable recognition, winning the Russian National Underwater World Award and the Grand Prix at the Golden Dolphin Diving Festival for the photo book "Orda Cave: Awareness" featuring images of the underwater gypsum cave Orda in the Perm region. Later that year, an original photo shoot titled "Lady of the Orda Cave" was conducted with Natalia Avseenko, taking place underwater in the Orda Cave over two days at a depth of 17 meters and a water temperature of 5 degrees Celsius. The Russia Today TV channel produced a documentary about this project in English, French, Spanish, and Arabic.

In 2015, an ecological expedition was conducted to monitor and document the pollution of Lake Baikal. During the expedition, photographer Viktor Lyagushkin captured the first underwater spherical panorama of the lake.

In 2019, Viktor Lyagushkin was invited by the World Underwater Activities Confederation to serve on the professional jury for the 17th World Underwater Photography Championships, held on the island of Tenerife.

In February to April 2019, Viktor Lyagushkin's works were featured in an innovative under-ice art exhibition in Nilmoguba Bay, in the White Sea. This marked the world's first experience of an under-ice art exhibition, where holes were cut into the sea ice cover to allow photographs printed on plastic to be displayed underwater, held in depth by weights. Access to the exhibition was free, though a diver's certificate was required. In March 2021, the site hosted another under-ice gallery exhibition that included not only Lyagushkin's photographs but also paintings and installations by artist Denis Lotaryov. This exhibition remained open until the ice began to melt and attracted scuba divers from various countries, including China, Germany, and France.

In February and March 2022, an exhibition titled "The Magical World of the White Sea" showcased 47 photographs by Viktor Lyagushkin at the Green River Park in Moscow's Lefortovo district. This event was organized in collaboration with the Lumiere Brothers Gallery. The exhibit highlighted the diverse inhabitants of the White Sea, drawing attention to the threats they face due to global warming and the resulting melting of ice in the region.

Since 2022, he has been residing in Tbilisi, Georgia. He is married to journalist Bogdana Vaschenko, a National Geographic magazine writer .

== International Competitions Awards ==
- 2013 — Gran Prix at Ocean Art Contest Winners for the photograph "Diver under the ice in Lazurny quarry";
- 2018 — 3rd Place in the Speleomoment Category at Speleofotografia for the photograph "The Last Supper";
- 2021 — Highly commended in the Wide Angle Category at Underwater Photographer of the Year for the photograph "Two Worlds";
- 2021 — Finalist at Smithsonian Magazine Photo Contest for the photograph "Green Clouds";
- 2022 — Winner in the Underwater Category at Close-up Photographer of the Year for the photograph "Little Predator".

== Books ==
- Viktor Lyagushkin; Nikolay Maximovich; Igor Lavrov; Bogdana Vaschenko (2011). Ординская пещера. Познание [Orda cave. Awareness.] (in Russian). Moscow: Студия «4+4». p. 160. ISBN 978-5-9902284-2-9.
- Viktor Lyagushkin; Bogdana Vaschenko; Gleb Chernyavsky (2014). Быть дельфином [Being a Dolphin.] (in Russian). Moscow: PHOTOTEAM.PRO. p. 160. ISBN 978-5-905826-05-4.
- Bogdana Vaschenko; Viktor Lyagushkin (2021). Беломорский бестиарий [White Sea Bestiary.] (in Russian). Moscow: PHOTOTEAM.PRO. p. 154.
