= Turka (Iren) =

River in Perm Krai, Russia

Physical characteristics
- Mouth: Iren
  - coordinates: 57.2054°N 56.6071°E
- Length: 72 km (45 mi)
- Basin size: 814 km^{2} (314 sq mi)

Basin features
- Progression: Iren→ Sylva→ Chusovaya→ Kama→ Volga→ Caspian Sea

The Turka (Russian: Турка) is a river in Perm Krai, Russia, a left tributary of the Iren, which in turn is a tributary of the Sylva. The river is 72 kilometres (45 mi) long, and its drainage basin covers 814 square kilometres (314 mi^{2}). The main tributaries are the Yug, Savlek, Byrma, Bolshaya Gorevaya, Beryozovka, and Chyornaya Turka.
