= Syp =

River in Perm Krai, Russia

Physical characteristics
- Mouth: Iren
  - coordinates: 57.027°N 56.6575°E
- Length: 61 km (38 mi)
- Basin size: 405 km^{2} (156 sq mi)

Basin features
- Progression: Iren→ Sylva→ Chusovaya→ Kama→ Volga→ Caspian Sea

The Syp (Russian: Сып) is a river in Perm Krai, Russia, a left tributary of the Iren, which in turn is a tributary of the Sylva. The river is 61 kilometres (38 mi) long and its drainage basin covers 405 square kilometres (156 mi^{2}). The main tributaries are the Beryozovka and the Kurmakash (right).
