= Byrma, Permsky District, Perm Krai =

Byrma Бырма
- Settlement
- Location within Perm Krai Location within Russia
- Coordinates: 57°37′N 56°12′E
- Country: Russia
- Region: Perm Krai
- District: Permsky District
- Time zone: UTC+5:00

Byrma (Russian: Бырма) is a rural locality (a settlement) in Palnikovskoye Rural Settlement, Permsky District, Perm Krai, Russia. The population was 153 as of 2010. There are 9 streets.

== Geography ==
Byrma is located 64 km south of Perm (the district's administrative centre) by road. Chelyaba is the nearest rural locality.
