= Orda Cave =

Cave in Russia

Coordinates: 57°10′55.2″N 56°53′17″E

- Ординская
- Ordinskaya
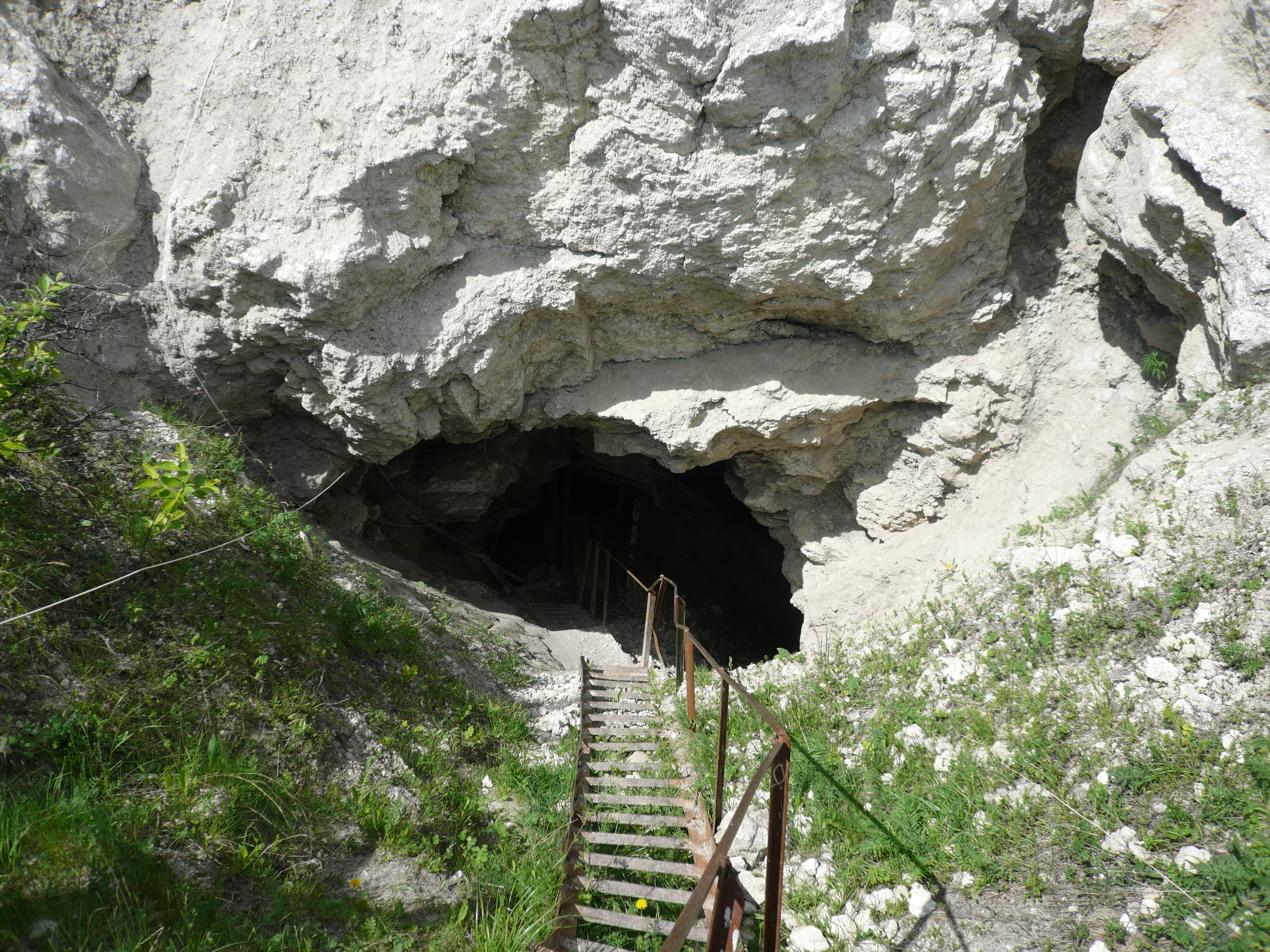
- The entrance to the Orda cave

- Location within Perm Krai Location within Russia
- Type: gypsum crystal cave
- Location: Perm Krai, Russia
- Region: Orda, Perm Krai

Site notes
- Length: 4,600 m (15,092 ft)
- Excavation dates: 1969
- Website: ordacave.com

Orda Cave (Ординская, Ordinskaya) is a gypsum cave found underneath the western Ural Mountains. The mouth is near the shore of the Kungur River just outside Orda, Perm Krai in Russia. The cave system stretches over 5.1 kilometres (3.2 mi) with around 4.8 kilometres (3.0 mi) over the overall length being underwater. This makes it one of the longest underwater caves and the largest underwater gypsum cave in the world. It contains the longest siphon in the former Soviet Union (935 meters).

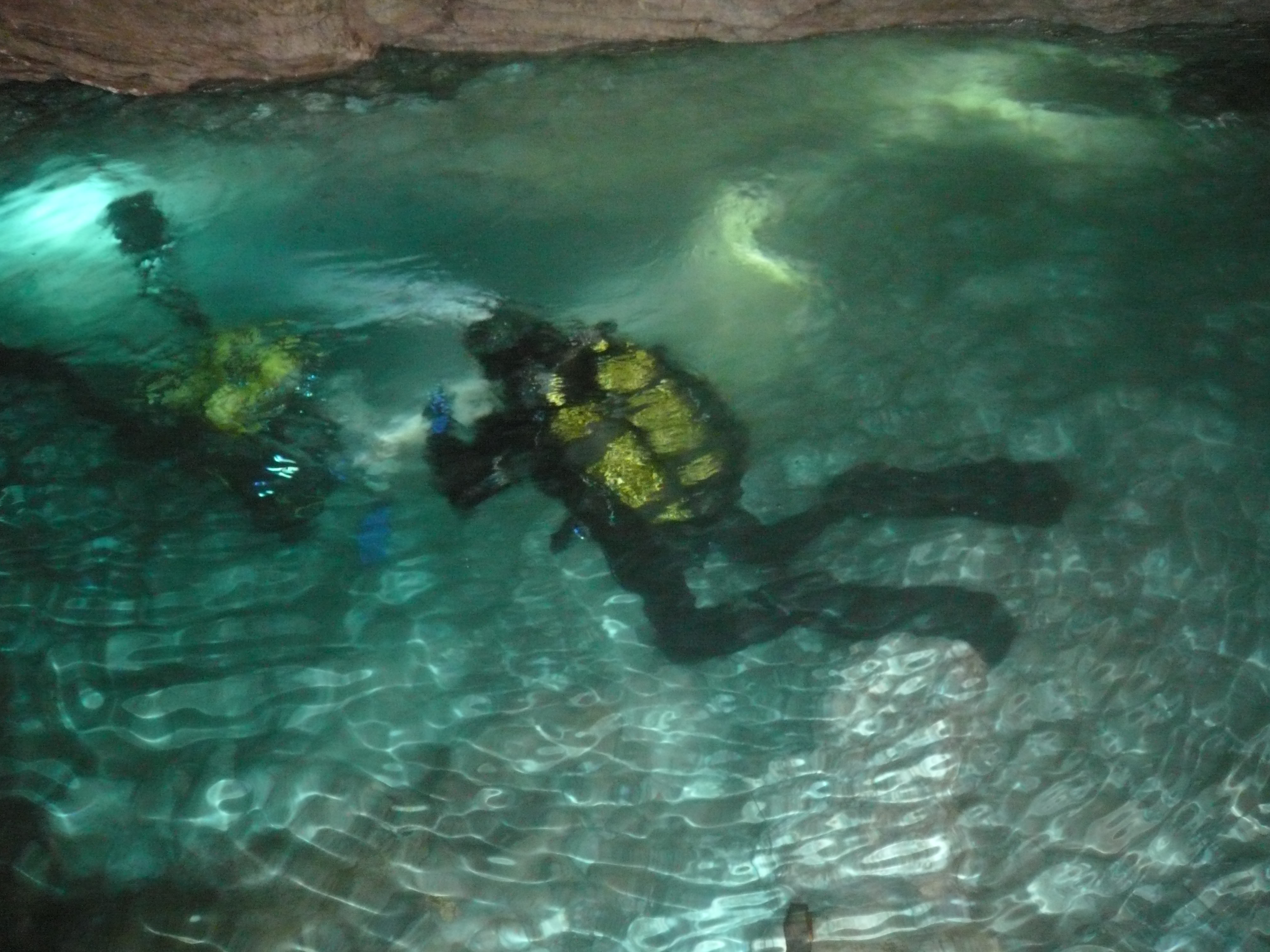
Cave diving

The mineral-rich area surrounding the cave filters the water and makes it very clear. Divers have a visibility of over 50 yards (46 m) making it an ideal location for photographic expeditions. Viktor Lyagushkin, a journalist and underwater photographer, led around 150 expeditions into the caves over a six-month period in 2011. The photographs taken by his team were published in the Orda Cave Awareness Project alongside stories from other divers who had visited the cave system. The diving team were also the first people to produce a spherical panorama of an underwater cave.

The cave has also been visited during dives by Martyn Farr, Lamar Hires, Pascal Bernabé, and Reggie Ross.
