= Aspa (river) =

River in Perm Krai, Russia

Physical characteristics
- Mouth: Iren
  - coordinates: 56°54′48″N 56°42′06″E
- Length: 51 km (32 mi)
- Basin size: 405 km^{2} (156 sq mi)

Basin features
- Progression: Iren→ Sylva→ Chusovaya→ Kama→ Volga→ Caspian Sea

The Aspa (Russian: Аспа) is a river in Perm Krai, Russia, a left tributary of Iren, which in turn is a tributary of Sylva. The river is 51 kilometres (32 mi) long. Main tributaries: Uya, Klyuchyovka (right), Usekay (left).
