= Byrma, Kishertsky District, Perm Krai =

Byrma Бырма
- Village
- Location within Perm Krai Location within Russia
- Coordinates: 57°15′N 57°40′E
- Country: Russia
- Region: Perm Krai
- District: Kishertsky District
- Time zone: UTC+5:00

Byrma (Russian: Бырма) is a rural locality (a village) in Osintsevskoye Rural Settlement, Kishertsky District, Perm Krai, Russia. The population was 174 as of 2010.

== Geography ==
Byrma is located on the Byrma River, 35 km southeast of Ust-Kishert (the district's administrative centre) by road. Brazhata is the nearest rural locality.
