= Shakva (river) =

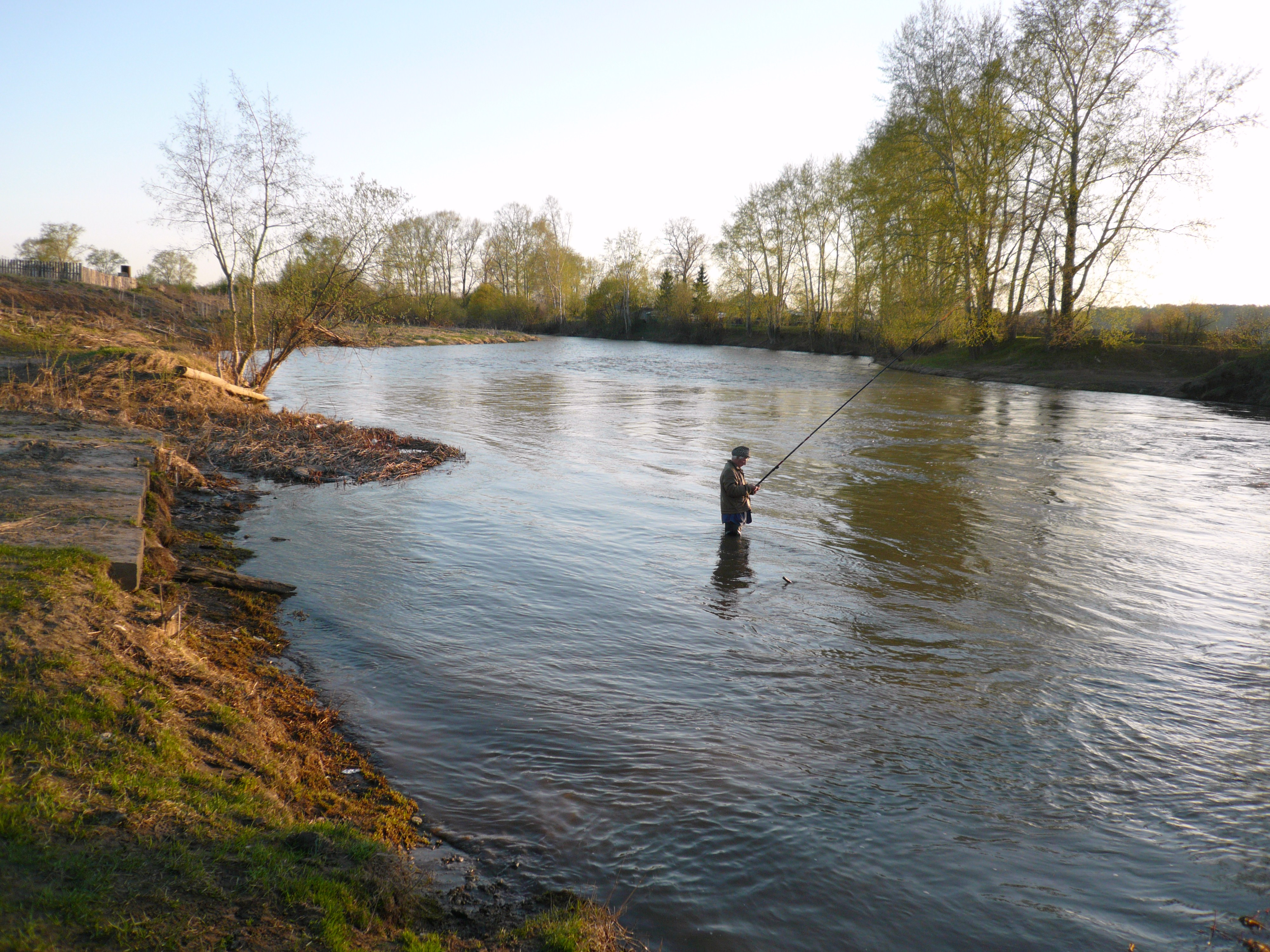

Location
- Country: Russia

Physical characteristics
- Mouth: Sylva
  - coordinates: 57°27′18″N 56°56′17″E
- Length: 167 km (104 mi)
- Basin size: 1,580 km^{2} (610 sq mi)

Basin features
- Progression: Sylva→ Chusovaya→ Kama→ Volga→ Caspian Sea

The Shakva (Russian: Шаква) is a river in Perm Krai, Russia, a right tributary of the Sylva. The river is 167 kilometres (104 mi) long, and its drainage basin covers 1,580 square kilometres (610 mi^{2}). Its origin is 2 kilometres (1 mi) north of the village of Soya. It flows through the Beryozovsky and Kungursky districts of the krai and into the Sylva near the town of Kungur. The average depth is 1.0 to 1.5 metres (3.3 to 4.9 ft), and the maximum depth is 2.7 metres (8.9 ft). The main tributaries are the Kultym and Bartym rivers (left), and the Sova and Saya rivers (right).

== Tributaries ==
Name	Direction	Length	Coordinates	Ref
Kultym (Russian: Култым)	Left	43 km (27 mi)	57°43′25″N 57°17′16″E	
Bartym (Russian: Бартым)	Left	27 km (17 mi)	57°40′01″N 57°20′24″E	
Sova (Russian: Сова)	Right	26 km (16 mi)	57°52′08″N 57°23′10″E	
Saya (Russian: Сая)	Right	17 km (11 mi)	57°39′13″N 57°17′43″E	
