= Telyos =

River in Perm Krai, Russia

Physical characteristics
- Mouth: Iren
  - coordinates: 56°52′34″N 56°43′57″E
- Length: 42 km (26 mi)

Basin features
- Progression: Iren→ Sylva→ Chusovaya→ Kama→ Volga→ Caspian Sea

The Telyos (Russian: Телёс) is a river in Perm Krai, Russia, a right tributary of the Iren, which in turn is a tributary of the Sylva. The river is 42 kilometres (26 mi) long. The main tributaries are Maly Telyos (left) and the Medyanka (right).
