= Kungur (river) =

River in Perm Krai, Russia

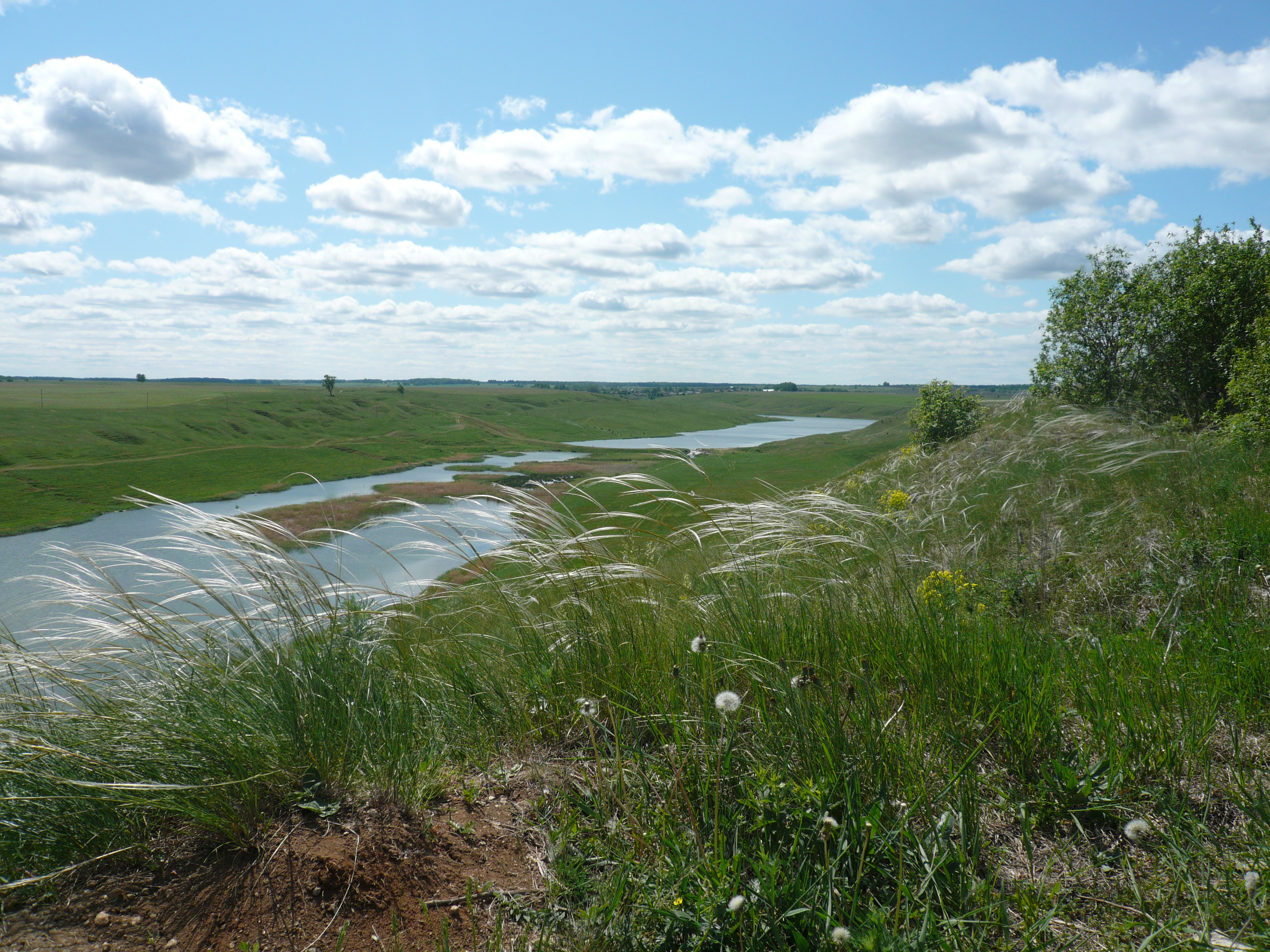

Physical characteristics
- Mouth: Iren
  - coordinates: 57°19′07″N 56°49′29″E
- Length: 40 km (25 mi)

Basin features
- Progression: Iren→ Sylva→ Chusovaya→ Kama→ Volga→ Caspian Sea

The Kungur (Russian: Кунгур) is a river in Perm Krai, Russia, a right tributary of the Iren, which in turn is a tributary of the Sylva. The river is 40 kilometres (25 mi) long. Main tributaries: Kormilovka (left), Gryaznukha (right).
