= Uinskoye =

Uinskoye Уинское
- Selo
- Flag
- Interactive map of Uinskoye
- Location of Uinskoye Uinskoye (Perm Krai)
- Coordinates: 56°52′47″N 56°35′06″E
- Country: Russia
- Federal subject: Perm Krai
- Administrative district: Uinsky District

Population (2010 Census)
  - Total: 4,304
  - Estimate (2021): 4,178 (−2.9%)

Administrative status
  - Capital of: Uinsky District
- Time zone: UTC+5 (MSK+2)
- OKTMO ID: 57652416101

Uinskoye (Russian: Уинское) is a rural locality (a selo) and the administrative center of Uinsky District in Perm Krai, Russia. Population: 4,304 (2010 census); 4,450 (2002 census); 4,484 (1989 Soviet census).
