= Kungur =

Town in Perm Krai, Russia

Kungur Кунгур
- Town
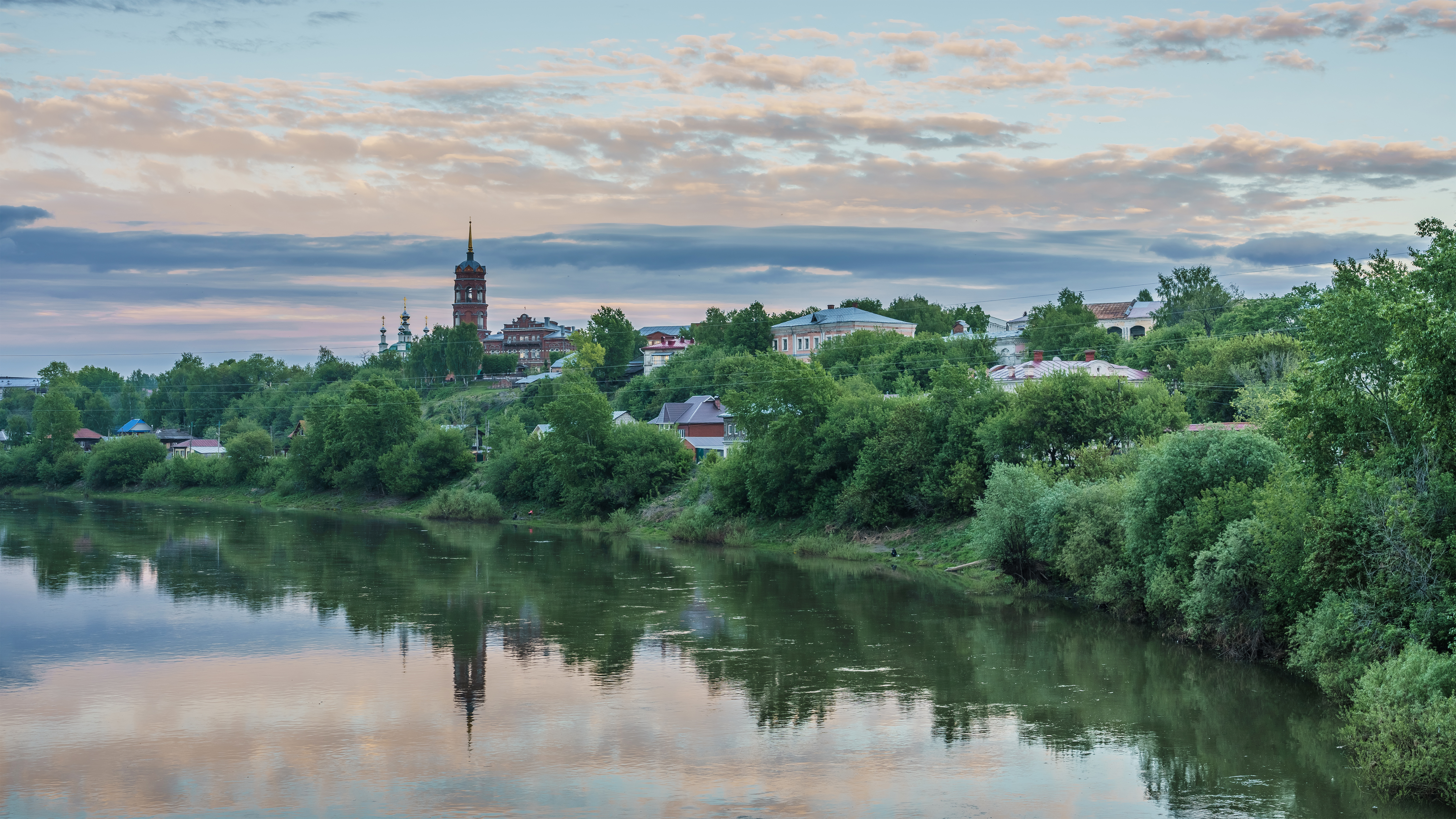
- Sylva River and Kungur

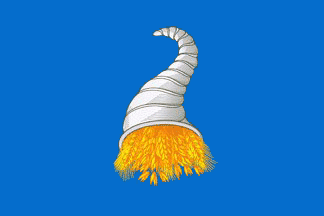
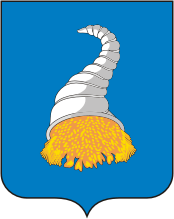
- Flag Coat of arms
- Interactive map of Kungur
- Location of Kungur Kungur (Perm Krai)
- Coordinates: 57°26′N 56°56′E
- Country: Russia
- Federal subject: Perm Krai
- Founded: 1648
- Elevation: 120 m (390 ft)

Population (2010 Census)
  - Total: 66,074
  - Estimate (2025): 60,946 (−7.8%)
  - Rank: 236th in 2010

Administrative status
  - Subordinated to: town of krai significance of Kungur
  - Capital of: Kungursky District, town of krai significance of Kungur

Municipal status
  - Urban okrug: Kungur Urban Okrug
  - Capital of: Kungur Urban Okrug, Kungursky Municipal District
- Time zone: UTC+5 (MSK+2)
- Postal code: 617470–617480
- OKTMO ID: 57722000001
- Website: www.kungur-adm.ru

Kungur (Russian: Кунгу́р) is a town in the southeast of Perm Krai, Russia, located in the Ural Mountains at the confluence of the rivers Iren and Shakva with the Sylva (Kama's basin). Population: 66,074 (2010 census); 68,943 (2002 census); 81,402 (1989 Soviet census); 62,173 (2023 Estimate).

== History ==
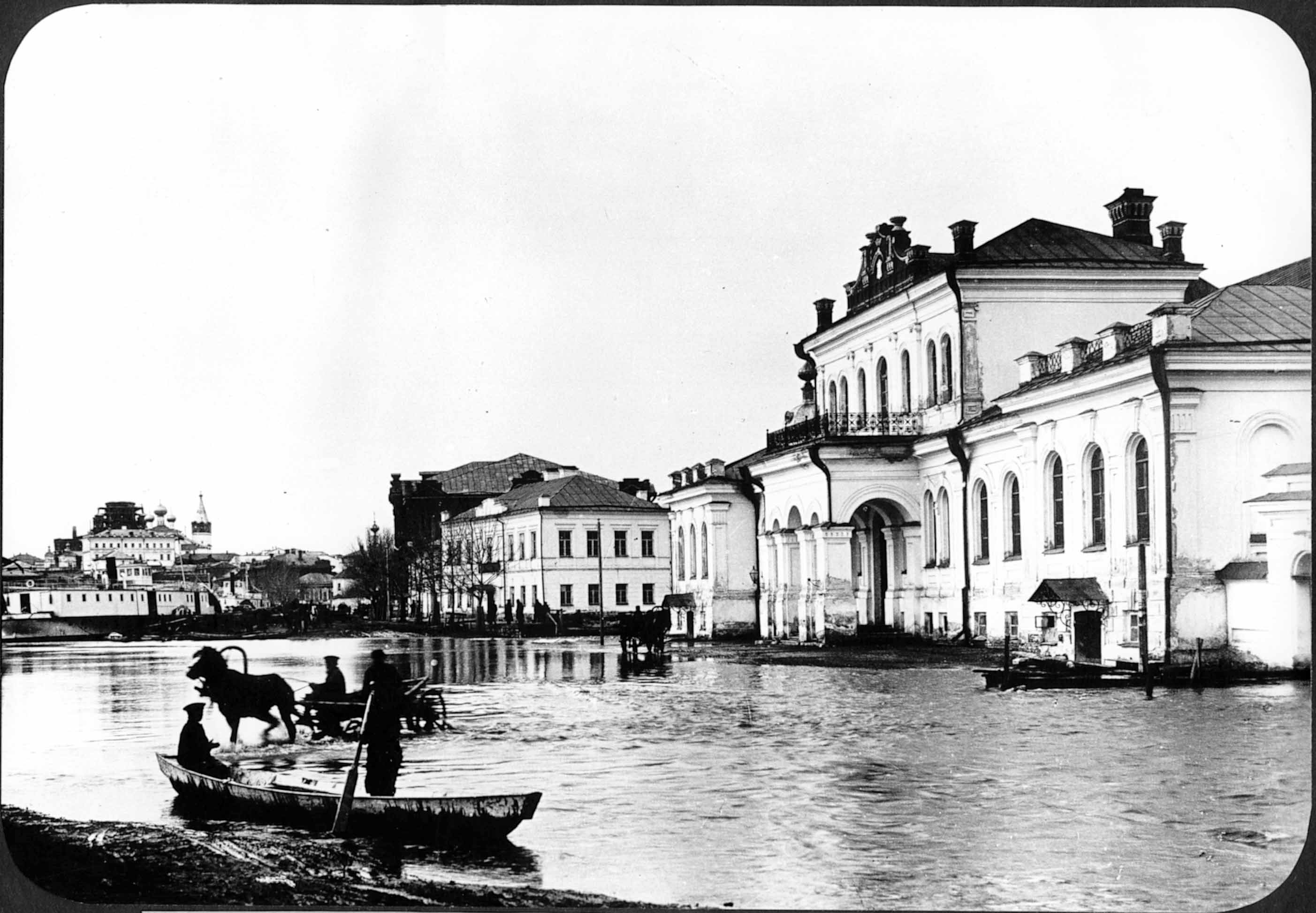
Flood in Kungur in the early 20th century

Kungur was founded 17 kilometers (11 mi) above the Iren's mouth on the banks of the Kungurka in 1648. In 1662, it was burnt by Bashkirs. In 1663, it was rebuilt as a fortress on the place of the village of Mysovskoye. In the beginning of the 18th century, leather and footwear industries started to develop here, and in 1724, a tannery was built. By the mid-18th century, Kungur became one of the most populated areas in the Urals.

In 1759, Perm administration of mining plants was moved to Kungur. By the end of the 18th century, Kungur was an important transit trade center of the Siberian road, as well as the center of leather manufacture in Perm Governorate. Kungur rope and linseed oil were widely known. In 1774, the town withstood a siege by Yemelyan Pugachev's Cossack forces. Many Polish insurgents of the January Uprising were exiled in Kungur in the 1860s. By the end of the 19th century, Kungur had become a significant industrial (including manufacture of leather footwear, gloves, and mittens) and cultural center.

In 1890 the Kungurian Age of the Permian Period of geological time was named for Kungur.

Kungur was the seat of the 1411th Artillery Ammunition Depot from 11 August 1941, the day of its establishment, to July 1945.

=== Coat of arms ===
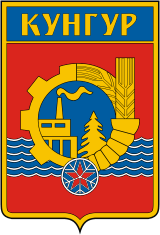
Soviet arms of Kungur from 1972

The town's original coat of arms became official according with the Highest Law of Empress Anna Ioannovna in 1737. The current coat of arms was adopted in 1994.

== Etymology ==
The name of the city was given by the Kungur River, which flows into the Iren at the site of the construction of the first fort. The hydronym arose under the influence of the Volga Bulgars (Ogur and Hungarian tribes) who came to the Volga-Kama territory in the 7th century, from them the name Kungur < Hungur < Vungur < Ungur is the name of the Onogur (On ogur) and Hungarian tribes. On the territory of Perm the Great and Udmurtia, archaeologists find quite a lot of Bulgar objects.

== Administrative and municipal status ==
Within the framework of administrative divisions, Kungur serves as the administrative center of Kungursky District, even though it is not a part of it. As an administrative division, it is incorporated separately as the town of krai significance of Kungur—an administrative unit with the status equal to that of the districts. As a municipal division, the town of krai significance of Kungur is incorporated as Kungur Urban Okrug.

== Economy ==
Major industries are SIA Turbobur and JSK "Kungur-footwear" (leather including army footwear). The town produces art goods (souvenirs from stone, maiolica), musical instrument (guitars) factories, repair-mechanical plant, clothing and knitting mills, and food industry companies. Rye, wheat, oats, barley, potatoes, vegetables are grown in Kungur, and the town also has meat-dairy cattle husbandry and aviculture.

=== Transportation ===
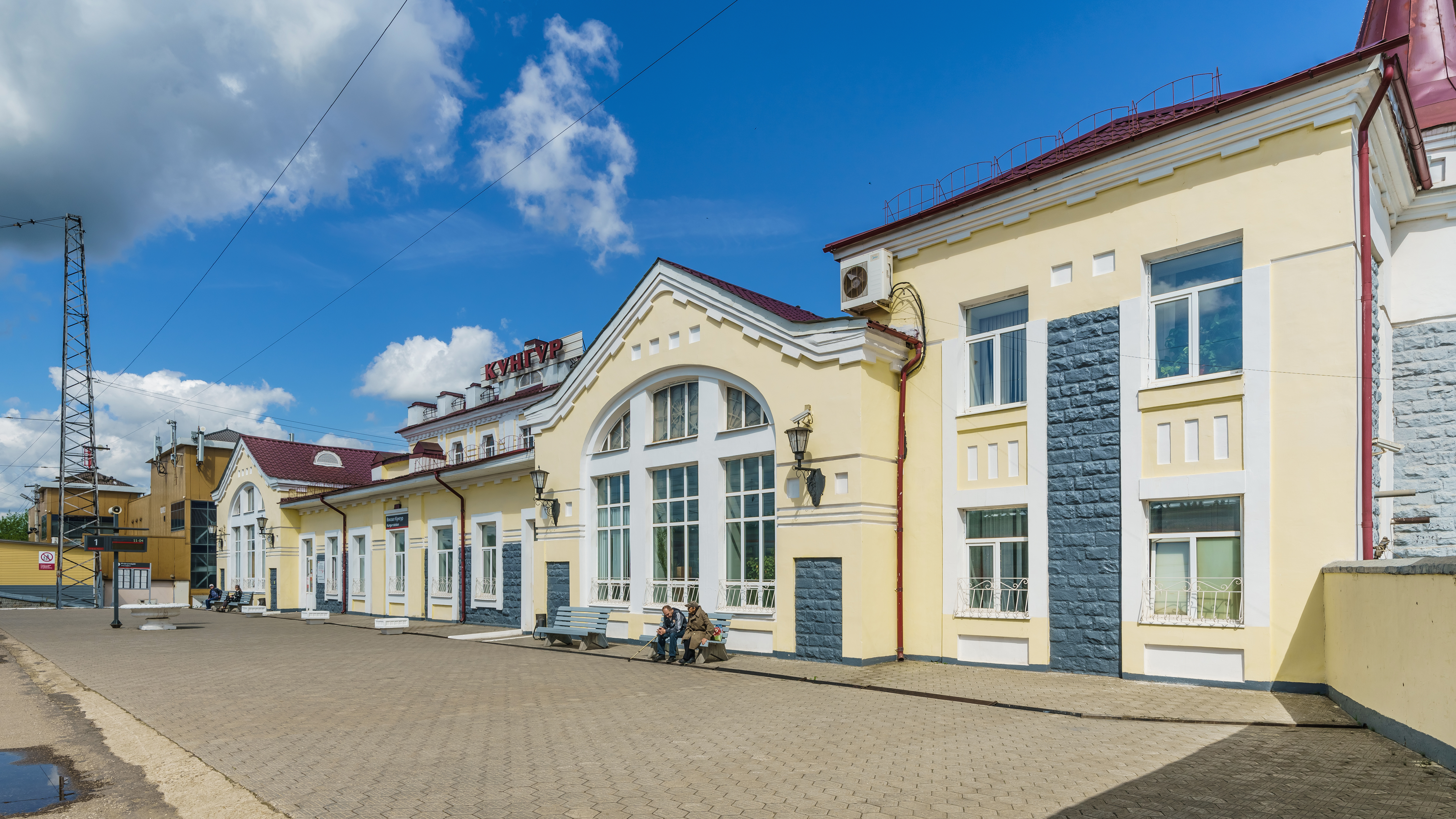
Kungur railway station

Kungur is located at the crossing of the Solikamsk route, the Siberian path, and the Trans-Siberian Highway.

== Architecture ==
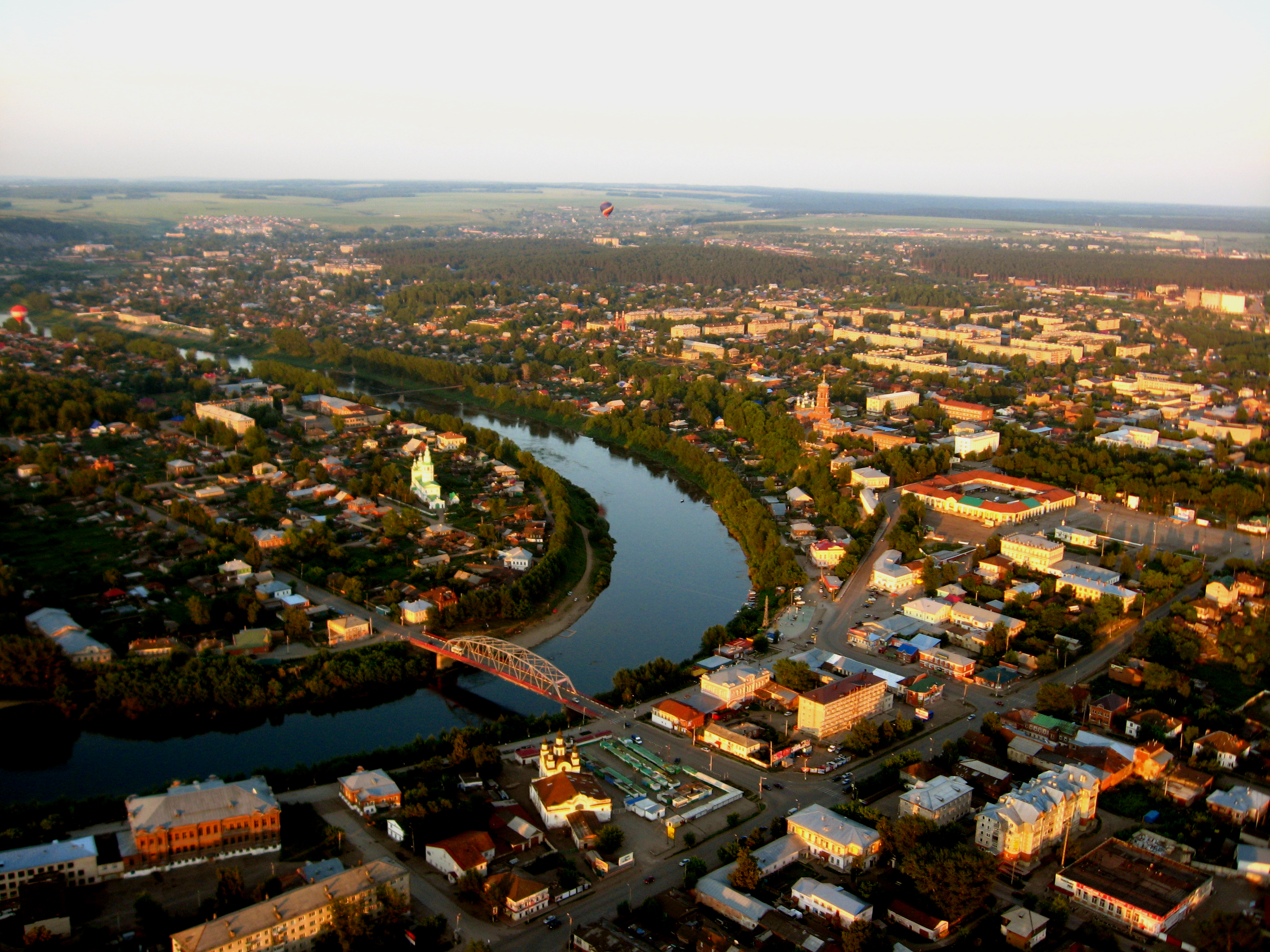
A bird's-eye view

Among the notable buildings in Kungur are the Transfiguration Church (1781), Saint Nicholas Church, former Guest courtyard with the Burse (1865–76, architect R. O. Karvovsky), the Zyryanov Hospice (1881, now the surgical department of a hospital), the 19th century storehouses of the Kopakov merchants (now a culture center).

The Tikhvinsky Temple was built in 1763 and got its name from the holy icon of Tikhvinskaya Bogomater. Now the movie theater "Oktyabr" is located in the building.

In the lower part of the town, on Kittarskaya street, is the Church of the Dormition, built in 1761. On the opposite bank of the Sylva river stands the Preobrazhensky Temple.

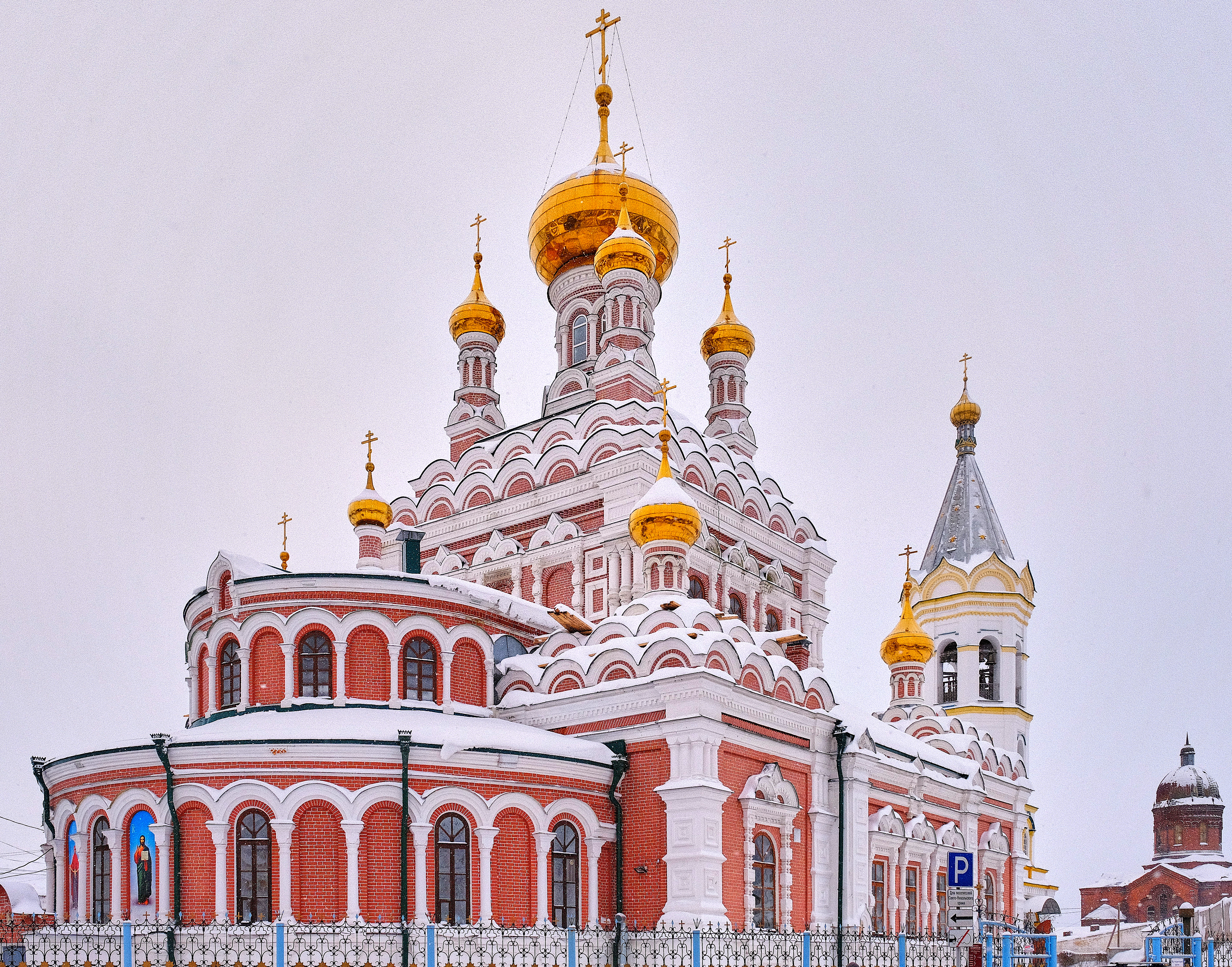
Saint Nicholas Church

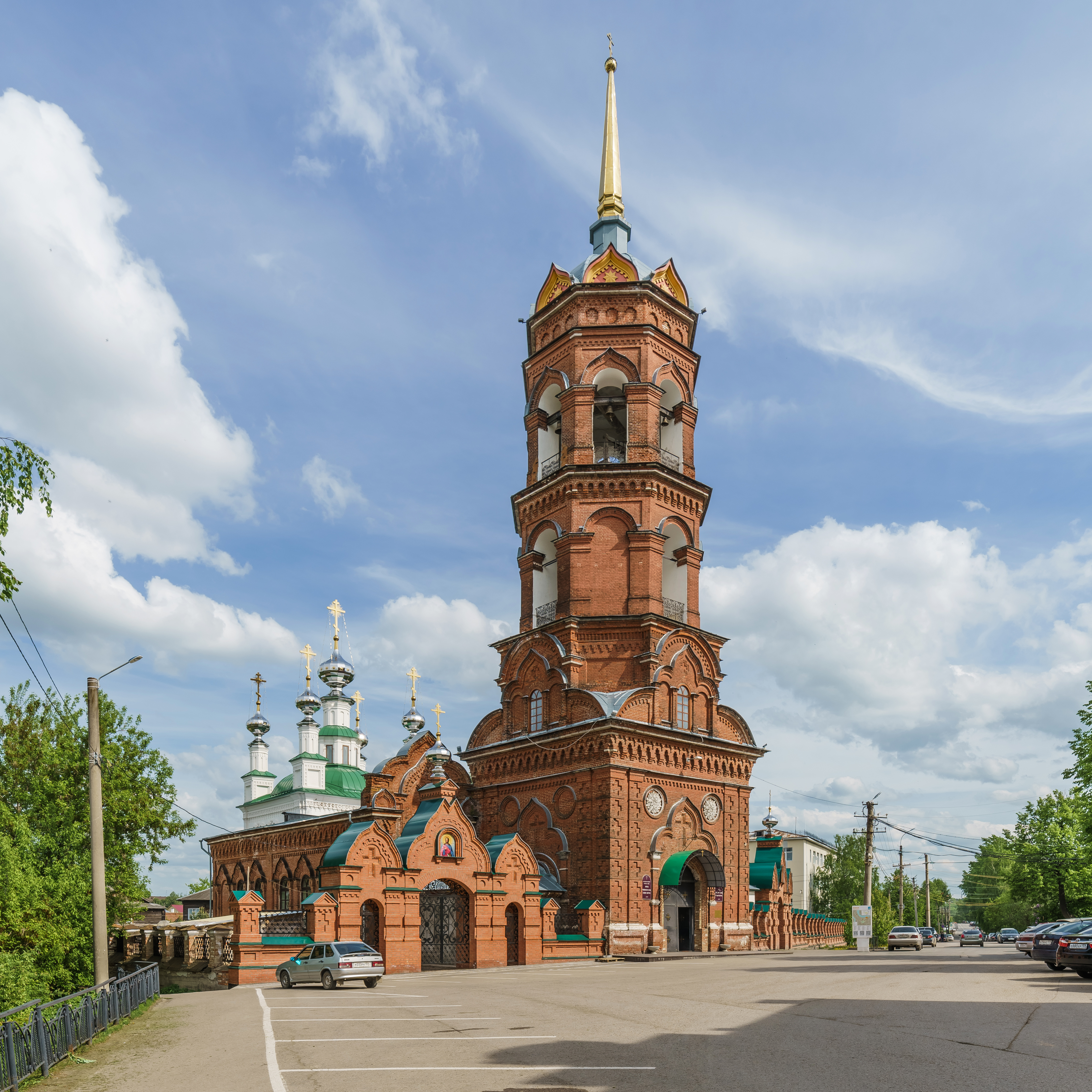
Church of the Theotokos of Tikhvin

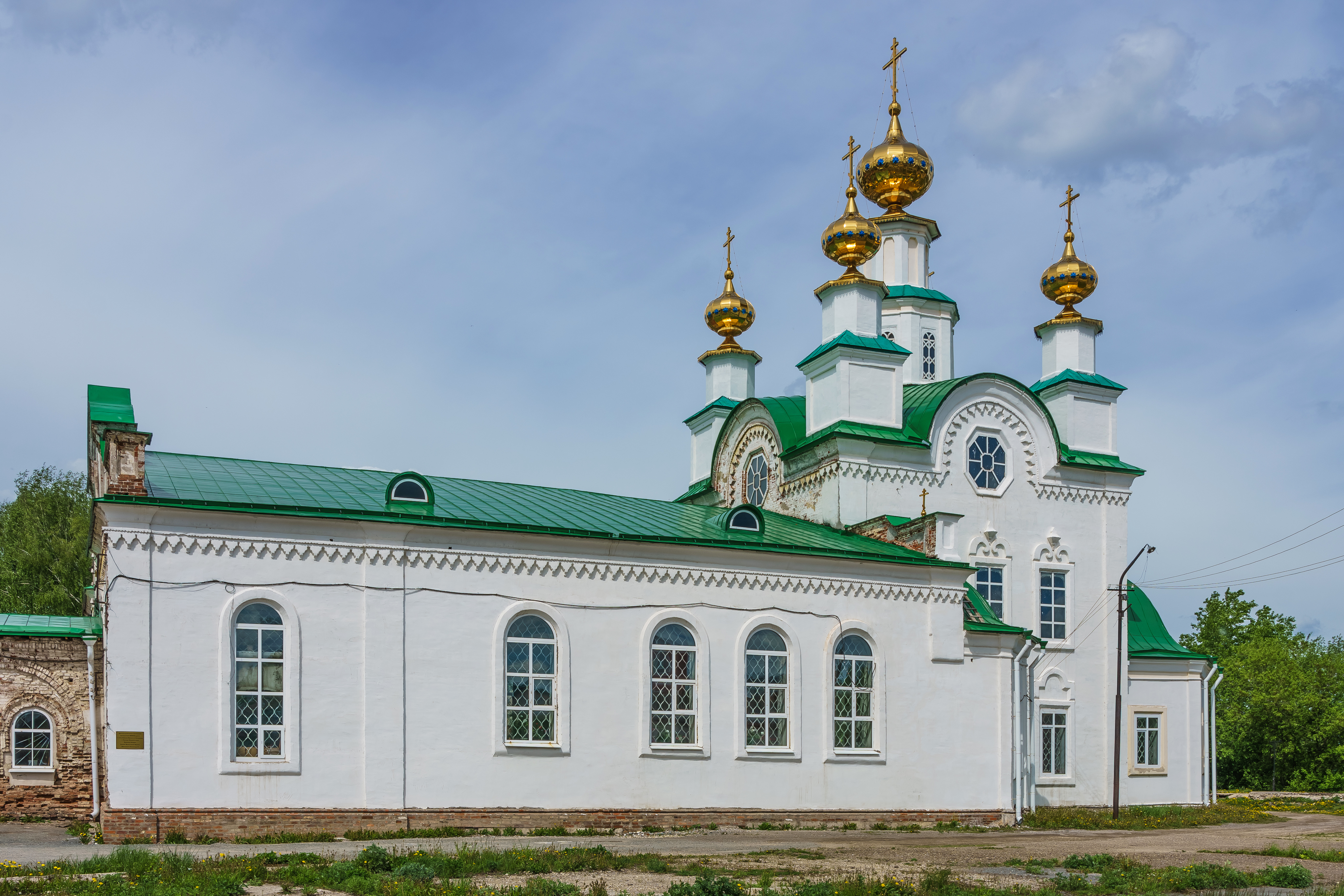
Church of the Dormition

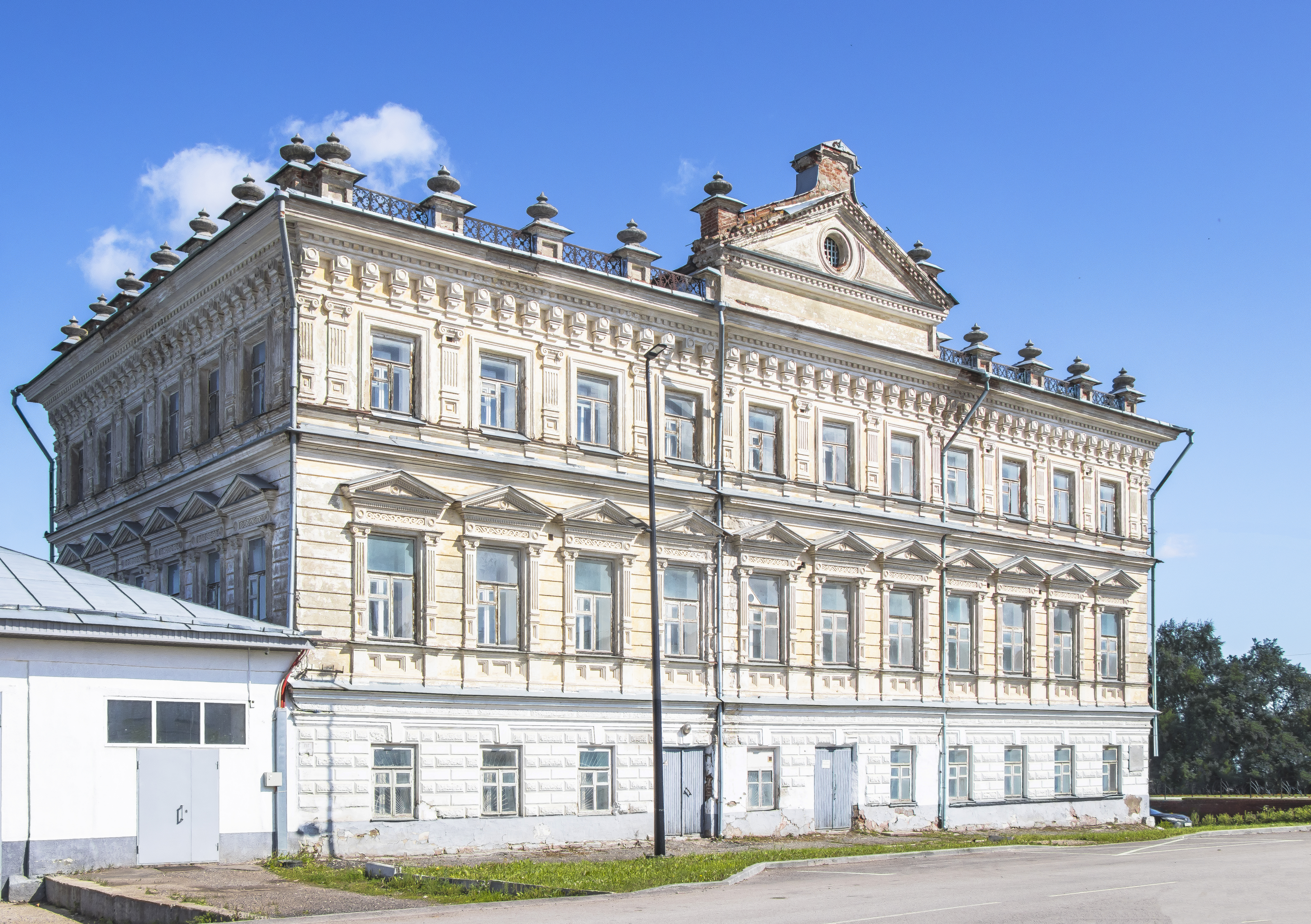
Old City Hall

== Tourism and attractions ==
=== Kungur Ice Cave ===
The Kungur Ice Cave is located in the vicinity of Kungur, on the right bank of the Sylva River. Ramified passages stretch under the ground for over 6,000 meters, and only a small part has already been explored. To this day, old slides and crumblings do not allow to determine the total length of the passages. In the explored part of the cave there are several dozens of grottoes; the largest one, which is called the Druzhba (Friendship) Grotto, was given its name in honor of the participants of the International Geological Congress who visited the cave in 1937. Inside this grotto there is a lake with the area of 750 m^{2}.

The grottoes are "adorned" with columns of stalagmites and icicles of stalactites up to two meters in height. Over millennia, limestone bearing water has created an infinite variety of forms in the cave, like snowflakes which change in size during the year and reach the size of a maple leaf during late winter. The cave is filled with water from the Sylva River twice a year, in spring and in fall, when it is not accessible to tourists.

=== Sky Fair and Сity Day ===
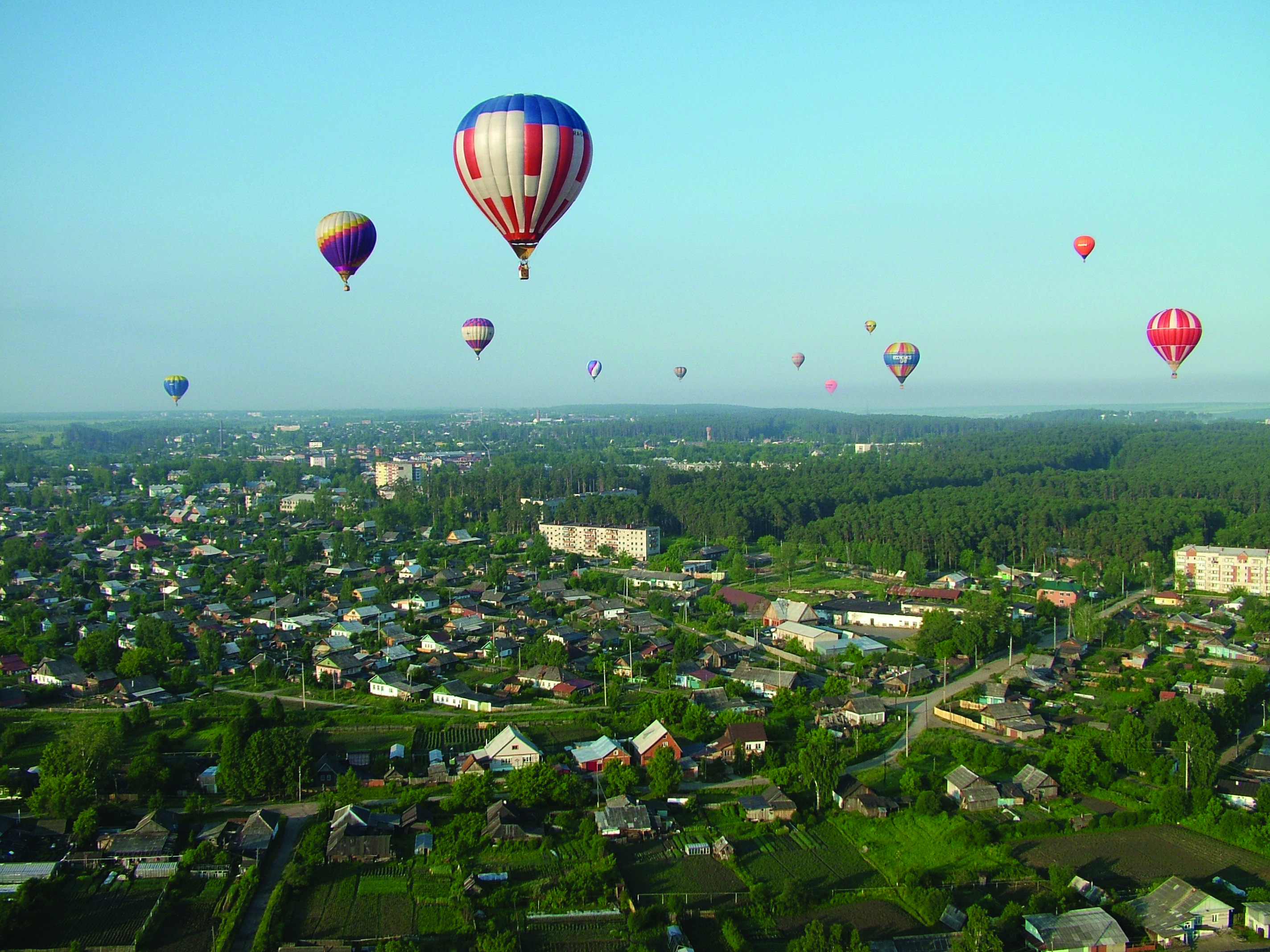

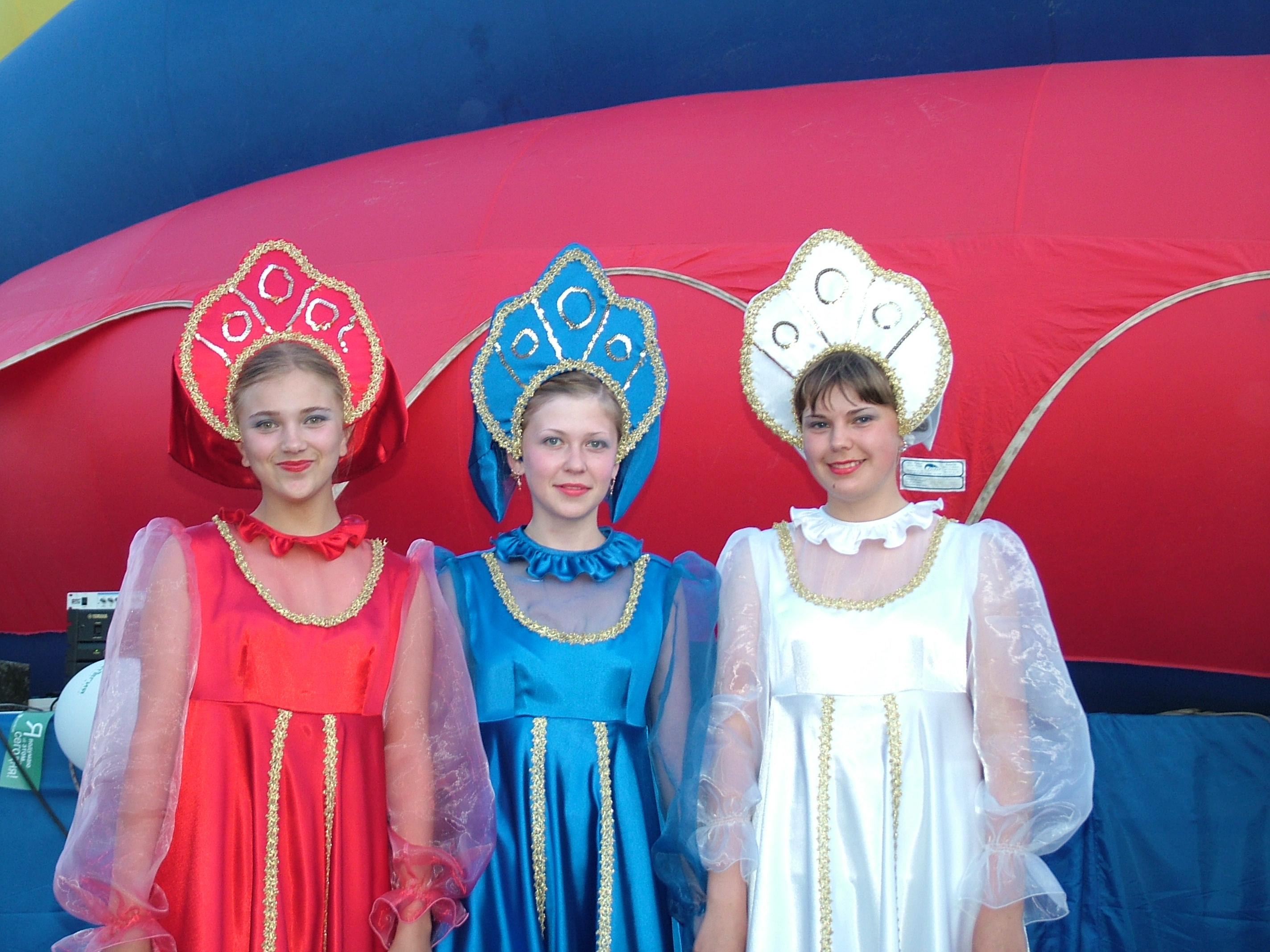

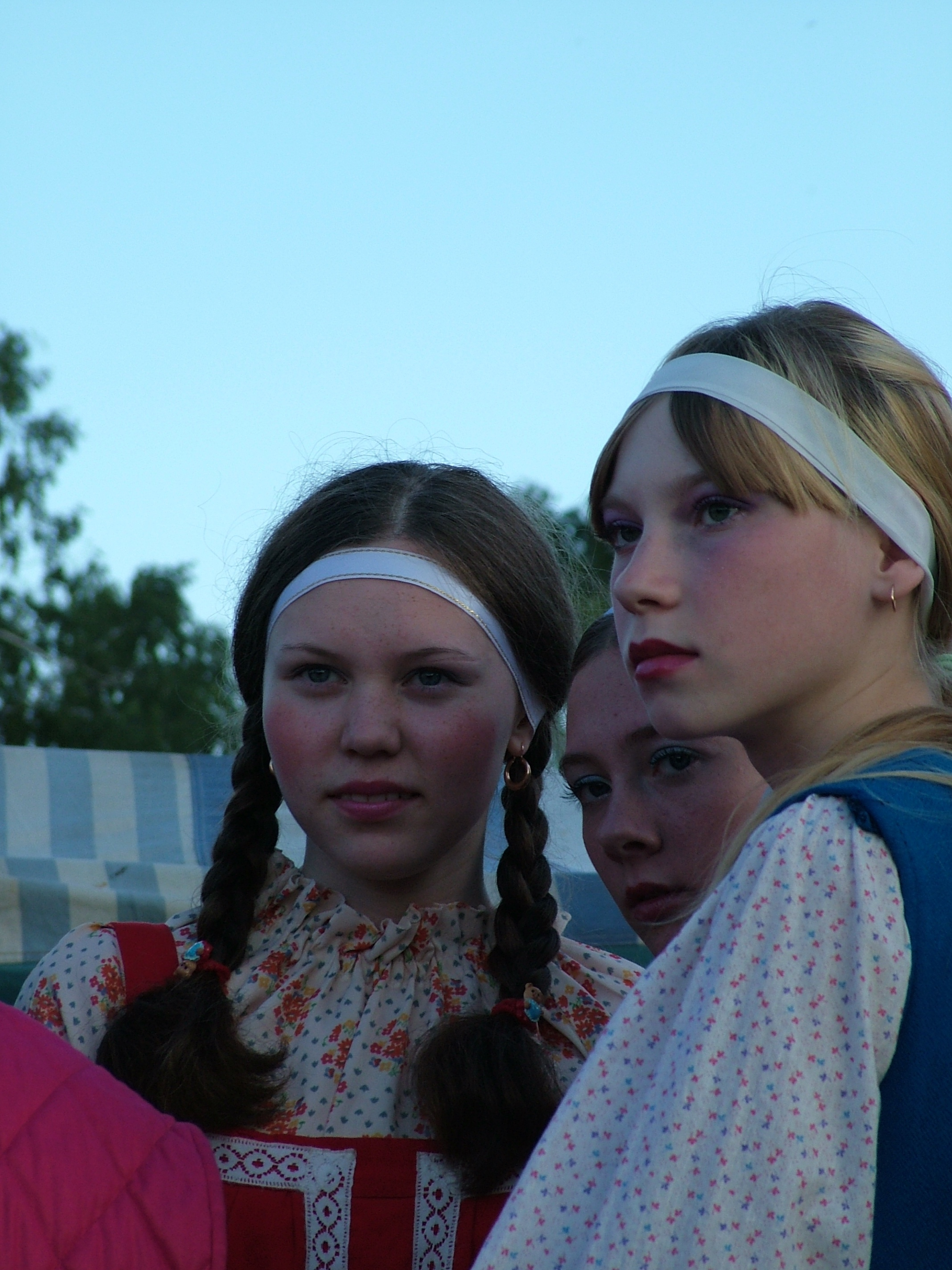

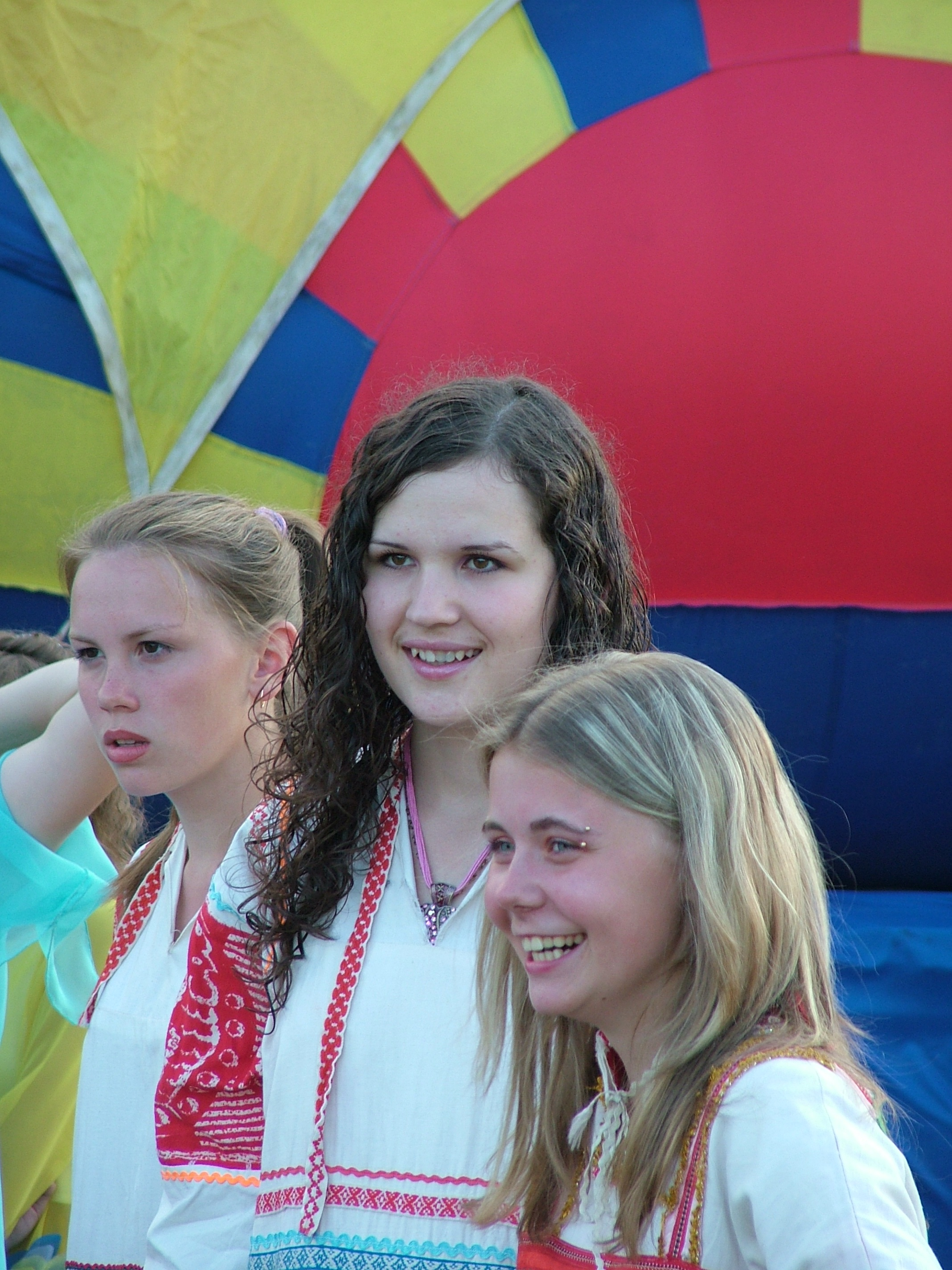

== Education ==
Educational facilities in the town include:

- Kungur Lyceum
- Kungur College of Woodwork
- Kungur Professional Art Lyceum
- School of Arts
- Kungur Pedagogical College
- Kungur Agricultural College
- Kungur College of Autotransport

== Sister city ==
- Samcheok, South Korea
