= Iren (river) =

River in Perm Krai, Russia

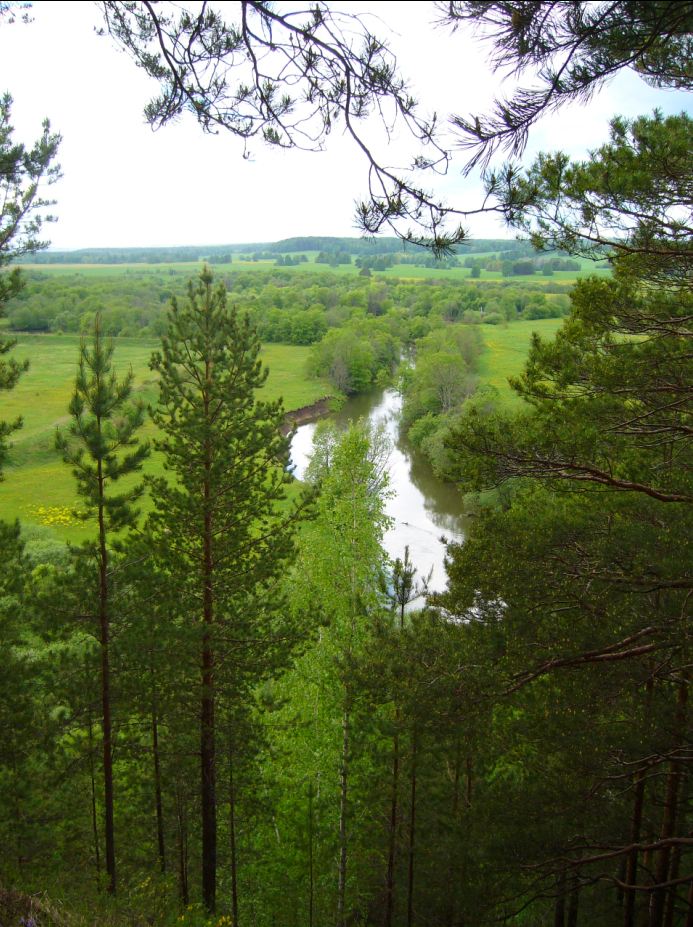

Physical characteristics
- Mouth: Sylva
  - coordinates: 57.4519°N 56.9280°E
- Length: 214 km (133 mi)
- Basin size: 6,110 km^{2} (2,360 sq mi)

Basin features
- Progression: Sylva→ Chusovaya→ Kama→ Volga→ Caspian Sea

The Iren (Russian: Ире́нь) is a river in Perm Krai, Russia, a left tributary of the Sylva. It is 214 kilometres (133 mi) long, with a drainage basin of 6,110 square kilometres (2,360 mi^{2}). It starts near village Verh-Iren, in Oktyabrsky District and flows through Uinsky, Ordinsky and Kungursky districts of Perm Krai.

Main tributaries:

- Left: Uyas, Aspa, Syp, Bym, Bolshoy Ashap, Maly Ashap, Turka
- Right: Telyos, Kungur.
