= Andreyevo =

Andreyevo (Russian: Андреево) is the name of several rural localities in Russia.

== Modern localities ==
- Andreyevo, Ivanovo Oblast, a village in Ivanovsky District of Ivanovo Oblast
- Andreyevo, Kaluga Oblast, a village in Tarussky District of Kaluga Oblast
- Andreyevo, Kirov Oblast, a village in Bezvodninsky Rural Okrug of Pizhansky District in Kirov Oblast; 57°28′N 48°26′E
- Andreyevo, Kostroma Oblast, a village in Pokrovskoye Settlement of Oktyabrsky District in Kostroma Oblast; 58°59′N 46°59′E
- Andreyevo (settlement), Leningrad Oblast, a settlement at the railway station in Glazhevskoye Settlement Municipal Formation of Kirishsky District in Leningrad Oblast; 59°33′N 32°3′E
- Andreyevo (village), Leningrad Oblast, a village in Glazhevskoye Settlement Municipal Formation of Kirishsky District in Leningrad Oblast; 59°33′N 32°2′E
- Andreyevo, Moscow Oblast, a village in Averkiyevskoye Rural Settlement of Pavlovo-Posadsky District in Moscow Oblast; 55°38′N 38°49′E
- Andreyevo, Chkalovsky District, Nizhny Novgorod Oblast, a village in Purekhovsky Selsoviet of Chkalovsky District in Nizhny Novgorod Oblast; 56°36′N 43°1′E
- Andreyevo, Varnavinsky District, Nizhny Novgorod Oblast, a village in Bogorodsky Selsoviet of Varnavinsky District in Nizhny Novgorod Oblast; 57°21′N 45°1′E
- Andreyevo, Kishertsky District, Perm Krai, a selo in Kishertsky District of Perm Krai
- Andreyevo, Sivinsky District, Perm Krai, a village in Sivinsky District of Perm Krai
- Andreyevo, Demidovsky District, Smolensk Oblast, a village in Poluyanovskoye Rural Settlement of Demidovsky District in Smolensk Oblast
- Andreyevo, Smolensky District, Smolensk Oblast, a village in Kasplyanskoye Rural Settlement of Smolensky District in Smolensk Oblast
- Andreyevo, Tver Oblast, a village in Maslovskoye Rural Settlement of Torzhoksky District in Tver Oblast
- Andreyevo, Vladimir Oblast, a settlement in Sudogodsky District of Vladimir Oblast
- Andreyevo, Vologda Oblast, a village in Talitsky Selsoviet of Kirillovsky District in Vologda Oblast
- Andreyevo, Yaroslavl Oblast, a village in Bolsheselsky Rural Okrug of Bolsheselsky District in Yaroslavl Oblast

== Alternative names ==
- Andreyevo, alternative name of Endirey, a selo in Khasavyurtovsky District of the Republic of Dagestan; 43°10′N 46°40′E

== See also ==
- Andreyev
