= Bolshaya Kumina =

River in Perm Krai, Russia

Location
- Country: Russia

Physical characteristics
- Mouth
  - location: Asovka
- Length: 17 km (11 mi)

Basin features
- Progression: Asovka→ Barda→ Sylva→ Chusovaya→ Kama→ Volga→ Caspian Sea

The Bolshaya Kumina (Russian: Большая Кумина) is a river in Perm Krai, Russia, a left tributary of Asovka which in turn is a tributary of Barda. The river is 17 kilometres (11 mi) long.
