= Serebryanka =

Serebryanka (Russian: Серебрянка), Serebrianka (Ukrainian: Серебря́нка), or Syerabranka (Belarusian: Серабранка), may refer to:

== Populated places ==
- Serebrianka, Crimea, Ukraine
- Serebrianka, Donetsk Oblast, Ukraine
- Serebryanka, Amur Oblast, Russia
- Serebryanka, Gaynsky District, Russia
- Serebryansk, formerly named Serebryanka, Kazakhstan
- Syerabranka, Minsk, Belarus

== Rivers ==
- Serebryanka (Moscow), a tributary of the Khapilovka in Moscow and Moscow Oblast, Russia
- Serebryanka (Moscow Oblast), a tributary of the Ucha in Pushkinsky District, Moscow Oblast, Russia
- Serebryanka (Sverdlovsk Oblast), a tributary of the Chusovaya in Sverdlovsk Oblast, Russia

== Other uses ==
- Serebryanka, a liquid waste tanker associated with Russian nuclear-powered icebreakers
