= Posad (disambiguation) =

Posad was a historical type of East Slavic settlement.

Posad may also refer to:

== Settlements in Russia ==
- Posad, Arkhangelsk Oblast
- Posad, Vereshchaginsky District
- Posad, Kishertsky District, Perm Krai

== Other ==
- Pavel Posád (born 1953), Czech Roman Catholic bishop
