= Bolshoy Lip =

Location
- Country: Russia

Physical characteristics
- Source
  - coordinates: 57.315247°N 58.537643°E
- Mouth
  - location: Vogulka
  - coordinates: 57.2674°N 58.2801°E
- Length: 24 km (15 mi)

Basin features
- Progression: Vogulka→ Sylva→ Chusovaya→ Kama→ Volga→ Caspian Sea

The Bolshoy Lip (Russian: Большой Лип) is a river in Sverdlovsk Oblast, Russia, a right tributary of the Vogulka, which in turn is a tributary of the Sylva. The Bolshoy Lip is 24 kilometres (15 mi) long.

== Water Registry Data ==
The code of the river in the State Water Register is 10010100812111100012531.
