= Shamaryata =

Shamaryata Шамарята
- Village
- Location within Perm Krai Location within Russia
- Coordinates: 57°20′N 57°42′E
- Country: Russia
- Region: Perm Krai
- District: Kishertsky District
- Time zone: UTC+5:00

Shamaryata (Russian: Шамарята) is a rural locality (a village) in Osintsevskoye Rural Settlement, Kishertsky District, Perm Krai, Russia. The population was 1 as of 2010.

== Geography ==
Shamaryata is located 35 km east of Ust-Kishert (the district's administrative centre) by road. Koshelevo is the nearest rural locality.
