= Osintsevo =

Osintsevo Осинцево
- Selo
- Location within Perm Krai Location within Russia
- Coordinates: 57°20′N 57°36′E
- Country: Russia
- Region: Perm Krai
- District: Kishertsky District
- Time zone: UTC+5:00

Osintsevo (Russian: Осинцево) is a rural locality (a selo) and the administrative center of Osintsevskoye Rural Settlement, Kishertsky District, Perm Krai, Russia. The population was 684 as of 2010. There are 10 streets.

== Geography ==
Osintsevo is located on the Lyok River, 29 km southeast of Ust-Kishert (the district's administrative centre) by road. Savyata is the nearest rural locality.
