= Bizyarka =

River in Perm Krai, Russia

Physical characteristics
- Mouth: Babka
  - coordinates: 57°32′05″N 56°07′17″E
- Length: 16 km (9.9 mi)

Basin features
- Progression: Babka→ Sylva→ Chusovaya→ Kama→ Volga→ Caspian Sea

The Bizyarka (Russian: Бизярка) is a river in Perm Krai, Russia, a right tributary of Babka which in turn is a tributary of Sylva. The river is 16 kilometres (10 mi) long.
