= Burylovo =

Burylovo Бурылово
- Village
- Location within Perm Krai Location within Russia
- Coordinates: 57°21′N 57°46′E
- Country: Russia
- Region: Perm Krai
- District: Kishertsky District
- Time zone: UTC+5:00

Burylovo (Russian: Бурылово) is a rural locality (a village) in Osintsevskoye Rural Settlement, Kishertsky District, Perm Krai, Russia. The population was 7 as of 2010.

== Geography ==
Burylovo is located 40 km east of Ust-Kishert (the district's administrative centre) by road. Borovchata is the nearest rural locality.
