= Molyobka (river) =

Location
- Country: Russia

Physical characteristics
- Mouth
  - location: Asovka
- Length: 15 km (9.3 mi)

Basin features
- Progression: Asovka→ Barda→ Sylva→ Chusovaya→ Kama→ Volga→ Caspian Sea

The Molyobka (Russian: Молёбка) is a river in Perm Krai, Russia, a right tributary of the Asovka. The Molyobka is 15 kilometres (9 mi) long. Its origin is located east of the village of Malyshi, and its mouth is upstream of the settlement of Asovo.
