= Dom otkykha 'Krasny Yar' =

Dom otkykha 'Krasny Yar' Дом отдыха «Красный Яр»
- Village
- Location within Perm Krai Location within Russia
- Coordinates: 57°20′N 57°22′E
- Country: Russia
- Region: Perm Krai
- District: Kishertsky District
- Time zone: UTC+5:00

Dom otkykha 'Krasny Yar' (Russian: Дом отдыха «Красный Яр») is a rural locality at holiday house, Kishertsky District, Perm Krai, Russia. The population was 149 as of 2010.

== Geography ==
It is located 25 km southeast of Ust-Kishert (the district's administrative centre) by road.
