= Petryata =

Petryata Петрята
- Village
- Location within Perm Krai Location within Russia
- Coordinates: 57°27′N 57°26′E
- Country: Russia
- Region: Perm Krai
- District: Kishertsky District
- Time zone: UTC+5:00

Petryata (Russian: Петрята) is a rural locality (a village) in Andreyevskoye Rural Settlement, Kishertsky District, Perm Krai, Russia. The population was 44 as of 2010.

== Geography ==
Petryata is located 25 km northeast of Ust-Kishert (the district's administrative centre) by road. Iyata is the nearest rural locality.
