= Fomichi =

Fomichi (Russian: Фомичи) is the name of several rural localities in Russia:

- Fomichi, Kishertsky District, Perm Krai, a village in Kishertsky District, Perm Krai
- Fomichi, Permsky District, Perm Krai, a village in Permsky District, Perm Krai
