= Yurmys =

Coordinates: 57.204271°N 58.530777°E

Physical characteristics
- Mouth
  - location: Vogulka
- Length: 15 km (9.3 mi)

Basin features
- Progression: Vogulka→ Sylva→ Chusovaya→ Kama→ Volga→ Caspian Sea

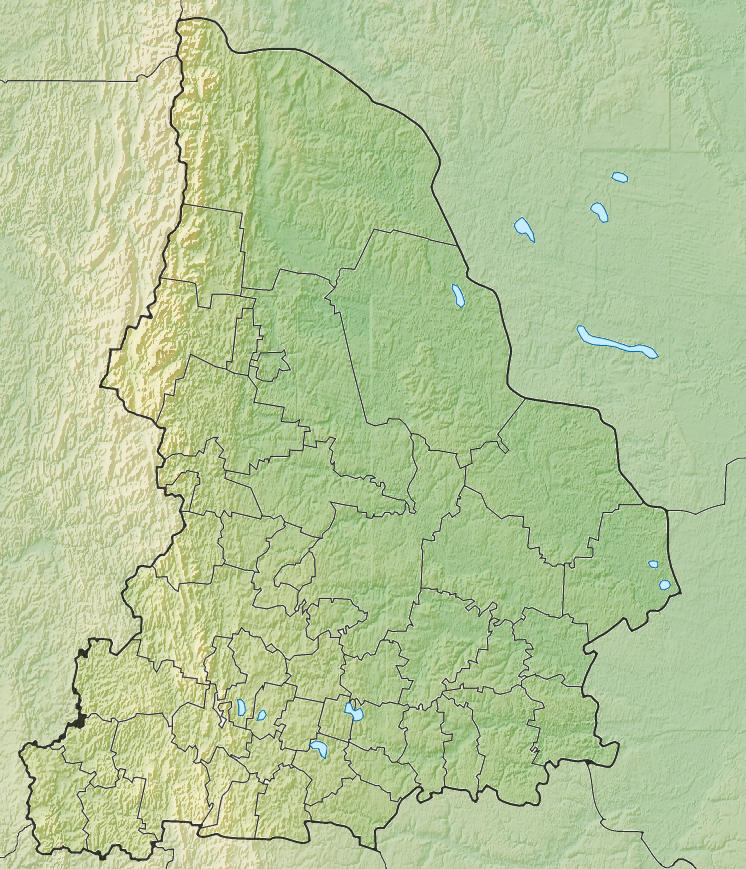
Physical map of Sverdlovsk region, Russia.

The Yurmys (Russian: Юрмыс) is a river in Sverdlovsk Oblast, Russia, a right tributary of Vogulka which in turn is a tributary of Sylva. The river is 15 kilometres (9 mi) long.
