= Korsaki =

Korsaki Корсаки
- Village
- Location within Perm Krai Location within Russia
- Coordinates: 57°20′N 57°32′E
- Country: Russia
- Region: Perm Krai
- District: Kishertsky District
- Time zone: UTC+5:00

Korsaki (Russian: Корсаки) is a rural locality (a village) in Andreyevskoye Rural Settlement, Kishertsky District, Perm Krai, Russia. The population was 7 as of 2010.

== Geography ==
Korsaki is located 22 km southeast of Ust-Kishert (the district's administrative centre) by road. Lyagushino is the nearest rural locality.
