= Molyobka =

Molyobka may refer to:

- Molyobka (rural locality), name of several rural localities in Russia
- Molyobka (river), a river in Perm Krai, Russia
