= Lebedyata =

Lebedyata Лебедята
- Village
- Location within Perm Krai Location within Russia
- Coordinates: 57°17′N 57°40′E
- Country: Russia
- Region: Perm Krai
- District: Kishertsky District
- Time zone: UTC+5:00

Lebedyata (Russian: Лебедята) is a rural locality (a village) in Osintsevskoye Rural Settlement, Kishertsky District, Perm Krai, Russia. The population was 13 as of 2010.

== Geography ==
Lebedyata is located 32 km southeast of Ust-Kishert (the district's administrative centre) by road. Yevdokino is the nearest rural locality.
