= Mazuyevka =

Mazuyevka Мазуевка
- Village
- Location within Perm Krai Location within Russia
- Coordinates: 57°15′N 57°21′E
- Country: Russia
- Region: Perm Krai
- District: Kishertsky District
- Time zone: UTC+5:00

Mazuyevka (Russian: Мазуевка) is a rural locality (a village) in Kishertskoye Rural Settlement, Kishertsky District, Perm Krai, Russia. The population was 242 as of 2010.

== Geography ==
Mazuyevka is located 16 km southeast of Ust-Kishert (the district's administrative centre) by road. Chyorny Yar is the nearest rural locality.
