= Medvedovo =

Medvedovo Медведево
- Selo
- Location within Perm Krai Location within Russia
- Coordinates: 57°21′N 57°29′E
- Country: Russia
- Region: Perm Krai
- District: Kishertsky District
- Time zone: UTC+5:00

Medvedovo (Russian: Медведево) is a rural locality (a selo) in Andreyevskoye Rural Settlement, Kishertsky District, Perm Krai, Russia. The population was 213 as of 2010. There are 6 streets.

== Geography ==
Medvedovo is located 17 km east of Ust-Kishert (the district's administrative centre) by road. Pyzhyanovo is the nearest rural locality.
