= Molyobka (rural locality) =

Molyobka (Russian: Молёбка) is the name of several rural localities in Perm Krai, Russia:

- Molyobka, Beryozovsky District, Perm Krai, a village in Beryozovsky District
- Molyobka, Kishertsky District, Perm Krai, a selo in Kishertsky District
