= Yelymovka =

River in Perm Krai, Russia

Physical characteristics
- Mouth: Babka
  - coordinates: 57°30′02″N 56°03′43″E
- Length: 25 km (16 mi)

Basin features
- Progression: Babka→ Sylva→ Chusovaya→ Kama→ Volga→ Caspian Sea

The Yelymovka (Russian: Елымовка) is a river in Perm Krai, Russia, a left tributary of the Babka, which in turn is a tributary of the Sylva. The river is 25 kilometres (16 mi) long.

The object code in the state water register is 10010100812111100013606.
