= Brazhata =

Brazhata Бражата
- Village
- Location within Perm Krai Location within Russia
- Coordinates: 57°14′N 57°41′E
- Country: Russia
- Region: Perm Krai
- District: Kishertsky District
- Time zone: UTC+5:00

Brazhata (Russian: Бражата) is a rural locality (a village) in Osintsevskoye Rural Settlement, Kishertsky District, Perm Krai, Russia. The population was 10 as of 2010.

== Geography ==
Brazhata is located 38 km southeast of Ust-Kishert (the district's administrative centre) by road. Byrma is the nearest rural locality.
