= Sukhobizyarka (river) =

River in Perm Krai, Russia

Physical characteristics
- Mouth: Babka
  - coordinates: 57°31′57″N 56°06′43″E
- Length: 17 km (11 mi)

Basin features
- Progression: Babka→ Sylva→ Chusovaya→ Kama→ Volga→ Caspian Sea

The Sukhobizyarka (Russian: Сухобизярка) is a river in Perm Krai, Russia, a left tributary of the Babka, which in turn is a tributary of the Sylva. The river is 17 kilometres (11 mi) long.
