= Spaso-Barda =

Spaso-Barda Спасо-Барда
- Selo
- Location within Perm Krai Location within Russia
- Coordinates: 57°21′N 57°21′E
- Country: Russia
- Region: Perm Krai
- District: Kishertsky District
- Time zone: UTC+5:00

Spaso-Barda (Russian: Спасо-Барда) is a rural locality (a selo) in Kishertskoye Rural Settlement, Kishertsky District, Perm Krai, Russia. The population was 370 as of 2010. There are 9 streets.

== Geography ==
Spaso-Barda is located 8 km east of Ust-Kishert (the district's administrative centre) by road. Zapoleno is the nearest rural locality.
