= Lyok =

Lyok Лёк
- Settlement
- Location within Perm Krai Location within Russia
- Coordinates: 57°23′N 57°46′E
- Country: Russia
- Region: Perm Krai
- District: Kishertsky District
- Time zone: UTC+5:00

Lyok (Russian: Лёк) is a rural locality (a settlement) in Kordonskoye Rural Settlement, Kishertsky District, Perm Krai, Russia. The population was 197 as of 2010. There are 9 streets.

== Geography ==
Lyok is located on the Lek River, 25 km southeast of Ust-Kishert (the district's administrative centre) by road. Zhenevo is the nearest rural locality.
