= Parunovo =

Parunovo Паруново
- Village
- Location within Perm Krai Location within Russia
- Coordinates: 57°17′N 57°37′E
- Country: Russia
- Region: Perm Krai
- District: Kishertsky District
- Time zone: UTC+5:00

Parunovo (Russian: Паруново) is a rural locality (a village) in Osintsevskoye Rural Settlement, Kishertsky District, Perm Krai, Russia. The population was 135 as of 2010.

== Geography ==
Parunovo is located on the Gryazushka River, 30 km southeast of Ust-Kishert (the district's administrative centre) by road. Savyata is the nearest rural locality.
