= Verkhnyaya Opalikha =

Verkhnyaya Opalikha Верхняя Опалиха
- Village
- Location within Perm Krai Location within Russia
- Coordinates: 57°23′N 57°27′E
- Country: Russia
- Region: Perm Krai
- District: Kishertsky District
- Time zone: UTC+5:00

Verkhnyaya Opalikha (Russian: Верхняя Опалиха) is a rural locality (a village) in Andreyevskoye Rural Settlement, Kishertsky District, Perm Krai, Russia. The population was 7 as of 2010.

== Geography ==
Verkhnyaya Opalikha is located 15 km east of Ust-Kishert (the district's administrative centre) by road. Andreyevo is the nearest rural locality.
