= Yevdokino =

Yevdokino Евдокино
- Village
- Location within Perm Krai Location within Russia
- Coordinates: 57°18′N 57°39′E
- Country: Russia
- Region: Perm Krai
- District: Kishertsky District
- Time zone: UTC+5:00

Yevdokino (Russian: Евдокино) is a rural locality (a village) in Osintsevskoye Rural Settlement, Kishertsky District, Perm Krai, Russia. The population was 25 as of 2010.

== Geography ==
Yevdokino is located 30 km southeast of Ust-Kishert (the district's administrative centre) by road. Osintsevo is the nearest rural locality.
