= Maly Lip =

Physical characteristics
- Mouth
  - location: Vogulka
- Length: 12 km (7.5 mi)

Basin features
- Progression: Vogulka→ Sylva→ Chusovaya→ Kama→ Volga→ Caspian Sea

The Maly Lip (Russian: Малый Лип) is a river in Sverdlovsk Oblast, Russia, a right tributary of the Vogulka, which in turn is a tributary of the Sylva. The Maly Lip is 12 kilometres (7.5 mi) long.
