= Makaryata =

Makaryata Макарята
- Village
- Location within Perm Krai Location within Russia
- Coordinates: 57°19′N 57°19′E
- Country: Russia
- Region: Perm Krai
- District: Kishertsky District
- Time zone: UTC+5:00

Makaryata (Russian: Макарята) is a rural locality (a village) in Kishertskoye Rural Settlement, Kishertsky District, Perm Krai, Russia. The population was 70 as of 2010.

== Geography ==
Makaryata is located 12 km southeast of Ust-Kishert (the district's administrative centre) by road. Sergino is the nearest rural locality.
