= Borovchata =

Borovchata Боровчата
- Village
- Location within Perm Krai Location within Russia
- Coordinates: 57°21′N 57°45′E
- Country: Russia
- Region: Perm Krai
- District: Kishertsky District
- Time zone: UTC+5:00

Borovchata (Russian: Боровчата) is a rural locality (a village) in Osintsevskoye Rural Settlement, Kishertsky District, Perm Krai, Russia. The population was 15 as of 2010.

== Geography ==
Borovchata is located 39 km east of Ust-Kishert (the district's administrative centre) by road. Burylovo is the nearest rural locality.
