= Turysh =

Physical characteristics
- Mouth: Irgina
  - coordinates: 56°45′55″N 57°37′39″E
- Length: 13 km (8.1 mi)
- Basin size: 89.9 km^{2} (34.7 sq mi)

Basin features
- Progression: Irgina→ Sylva→ Chusovaya→ Kama→ Volga→ Caspian Sea

The Turysh (Russian: Турыш) is a river in Sverdlovsk Oblast, Russia, a right tributary of the Irgina which in turn is a tributary of Sylva. The river is 13 kilometres (8 mi) long with a drainage basin of 89.9 square kilometres (34.7 mi^{2}).
