= Ust-Kishert =

Ust-Kishert (Russian: Усть-Кишерть) is the name of several rural localities in Russia:

- Ust-Kishert, Perm Krai, a selo in Kishertsky District of Perm Krai
- Ust-Kishert, Sverdlovsk Oblast, a village in Artinsky District of Sverdlovsk Oblast
