= Seda, Perm Krai =

Seda Седа
- Selo
- Location within Perm Krai Location within Russia
- Coordinates: 57°19′N 57°16′E
- Country: Russia
- Region: Perm Krai
- District: Kishertsky District
- Time zone: UTC+5:00

Seda (Russian: Седа) is a rural locality (a selo) in Kishertskoye Rural Settlement, Kishertsky District, Perm Krai, Russia. The population was 211 as of 2010.

== Geography ==
Seda is located 5 km south of Ust-Kishert (the district's administrative centre) by road. Nizkoye is the nearest rural locality.
