= Kushtanka =

River in Perm Krai, Russia

Physical characteristics
- Mouth: Babka
  - location: Kukushtan
  - coordinates: 57°39′12″N 56°30′09″E
- Length: 15 km (9.3 mi)

Basin features
- Progression: Babka→ Sylva→ Chusovaya→ Kama→ Volga→ Caspian Sea

The Kushtanka (Russian: Куштанка) is a river in Perm Krai, Russia, a right tributary of the Babka, which in turn is a tributary of the Sylva. The river is 15 kilometres (9 mi) long.
