= Ilyata =

Ilyata Ильята
- Village
- Location within Perm Krai Location within Russia
- Coordinates: 57°27′N 57°27′E
- Country: Russia
- Region: Perm Krai
- District: Kishertsky District
- Time zone: UTC+5:00

Ilyata (Russian: Ильята) is a rural locality (a village) in Andreyevskoye Rural Settlement, Kishertsky District, Perm Krai, Russia. The population was 66 as of 2010.

== Geography ==
Ilyata is located 23 km northeast of Ust-Kishert (the district's administrative centre) by road. Petryata is the nearest rural locality.
