= Asovka =

River in Perm Krai, Russia

Location
- Country: Russia

Physical characteristics
- Mouth
  - location: Barda
  - coordinates: 57°29′22″N 57°34′1″E
- Length: 39 km (24 mi)
- Basin size: 397 km^{2} (153 sq mi)

Basin features
- Progression: Barda→ Sylva→ Chusovaya→ Kama→ Volga→ Caspian Sea

The Asovka (Russian: Асовка) is a river in Perm Krai, Russia, a left tributary of the Barda. The river is 39 kilometres (24 mi) long, and its drainage basin covers 397 square kilometres (153 mi^{2}). Its origin is located east of village Machino, near the border with Sverdlovsk Oblast. Main tributaries: Molyobka (right); Bolshaya Kumina, Sosnovka (left).
