= Chechenino =

Chechenino Чеченино
- Village
- Location within Perm Krai Location within Russia
- Coordinates: 57°27′N 57°25′E
- Country: Russia
- Region: Perm Krai
- District: Kishertsky District
- Time zone: UTC+5:00

Chechenino (Russian: Чеченино) is a rural locality (a village) in Andreyevskoye Rural Settlement, Kishertsky District, Perm Krai, Russia. The population was 6 as of 2010.

== Geography ==
Chechenino is located 26 km northeast of Ust-Kishert (the district's administrative centre) by road. Petryata is the nearest rural locality.
