= Verkhnyaya Solyanka =

Verkhnyaya Solyanka Верхняя Солянка
- Village
- Location within Perm Krai Location within Russia
- Coordinates: 57°23′18″N 57°33′06″E
- Country: Russia
- Region: Perm Krai
- District: Kishertsky District
- Time zone: UTC+5:00

Verkhnyaya Solyanka (Russian: Верхняя Солянка) is a rural locality (a village) in Andreyevskoye Rural Settlement, Kishertsky District, Perm Krai, Russia. The population was 313 as of 2010. There are 6 streets.

== Geography ==
Verkhnyaya Solyanka is located 22 km east of Ust-Kishert (the district's administrative centre) by road. Dunino is the nearest rural locality.
