= Shumkovo, Kishertsky District, Perm Krai =

Shumkovo Шумково
- Settlement
- Location within Perm Krai Location within Russia
- Coordinates: 57°22′N 57°25′E
- Country: Russia
- Region: Perm Krai
- District: Kishertsky District
- Time zone: UTC+5:00

Shumkovo (Russian: Шумково) is a rural locality (a settlement) in Andreyevskoye Rural Settlement, Kishertsky District, Perm Krai, Russia. The population was 139 as of 2010.

== Geography ==
Shumkovo is located 14 km east of Ust-Kishert (the district's administrative centre) by road. Andreyevo is the nearest rural locality.
