= Shurtan (river) =

River in Perm Krai, Russia

Physical characteristics
- Mouth: Irgina
  - coordinates: 56°51′24″N 57°26′22″E
- Length: 45 km (28 mi)
- Basin size: 338 km^{2} (131 sq mi)

Basin features
- Progression: Irgina→ Sylva→ Chusovaya→ Kama→ Volga→ Caspian Sea

The Shurtan (Russian: Шуртан) is a river in Perm Krai and Sverdlovsk Oblast, Russia, a left tributary of the Irgina, which in turn is a tributary of the Sylva. The river is 45 kilometres (28 mi) long, and its drainage basin covers 338 square kilometres (131 mi^{2}).
