= Heinkel He 112 operational service =

Heinkel's He 112 was a German fighter aircraft designed by Walter and Siegfried Günter. It was one of four planes designed to compete for the Luftwaffe's 1933 fighter contract, which was eventually won by the Messerschmitt Bf 109. Small numbers of the He 112 were used for a short time by the Luftwaffe, and small runs were completed for several other countries, but only about one hundred were completed in total.

== Condor Legion ==
When it was clear the 112 was losing the contest, Heinkel offered to re-equip the V6 prototype with 20 mm cannon armament as an experimental aircraft. The Technisches Amt (Technical Office) was very interested; at the time many tanks were equipped with 20 mm guns as their primary anti-tank armament, the same armament on a plane could prove to be a powerful weapon.

In September a 20 mm MG C/30L cannon was mounted to the plane, with the breech to the rear of the engine and the barrel lying between the cylinder banks and exiting in the propeller spinner. This is the first experimental mounting of what would later be called the Motorkanone, a feature that would become a standard on most single-inline engined German fighters. She was then broken down and shipped to Spain on 9 December.

After being re-assembled she was assigned to Versuchsjagdgruppe 88, a group within the Legión Cóndor devoted to testing new planes. There she was nicknamed the Kanonenvogel (Cannon Bird), and joined three V-series Bf 109s which were also in testing.

The Kanonenvogel was adopted by Oberleutnant Günter Radusch who started flying the plane on 9 December at Tablada. From then on it joined the Ju 87As and Hs 123s already in service and was used as a ground attack plane. On 6 February the plane was moved to Villa de Prado near Madrid, and then in March, she was reassigned to Jagdgruppe 88 at Almorox near Toledo.

While sitting at Almorox due to a mechanical problem in his He 45C, Oberleutnant Wilhelm Balthasar heard that a Republican armored train was approaching and talked himself into the cockpit of the V6 by insisting he was a Heinkel test pilot. After teaching himself to fly the plane and managing to get into the air, he found the train parked at the station in Seseña and attacked it. On his third pass, one of the 20 mm shells punctured the ammunition car and the entire train exploded. Then on the way back to Almorox he came across an armored car and set it on fire.

His exploit in the V6 made him famous, and Balthasar found himself in command of the newly formed combat group with the V6 and three He 45C recon planes. Over the next few months, the V6 was flown by a number of pilots, and on 6 July Unteroffizier Max Schulze knocked out an additional number of armored cars. On 19 July Schulze was once again flying the V6 when the engine seized during landing. Schultze walked away from the resulting pancake landing, but the plane was heavily damaged and was a written off.

V8 and V9 were then sent to Spain in the spring of 1938. The V8 was the earlier A series model with the larger DB600Aa engine, but it was only in Spain until July when it crashed. V9 was the B series platform and armed with twin 20 mm cannons. Like the V6, it was then used primarily as a ground attack plane, but it was also flown by a number of experienced Spanish pilots before being returned to Heinkel and becoming the show plane.

== Luftwaffe ==
The early stages of the Third Reich's expansion plans consisted of a series of annexations of territory where the majority of the population were culturally German. This started with the March 1938 Anschluss, the annexation of Austria. Next on the list came the Sudetenland, a portion of western Czechoslovakia. Czechoslovakia was not interested in giving it up, and unlike the Austrian example, it did not look like France and the United Kingdom were going to simply sit back and watch. Suddenly the possibility of a military confrontation looked very real.

As a result, the Luftwaffe pressed every flightworthy fighter into service. At the time the Japanese Navy batch of 112Bs was being completed, and these were taken over and used to form IV./JG 132 on 1 July 1938. They were first based at Oschatz, but were moved to Karlsbad on 6 October.

The planes moved again on 17 November to Mährish-Trübau, where they were reformed as I./JG 331. But by that time the crisis had passed, and I./JG 331 received Bf 109Cs in place of the 112Bs. The planes were then returned to Heinkel and then shipped to Japan to fulfill the order.

A number of other 112s at the Heinkel plant were used as a factory defense unit, flown by Heinkel test pilots (all civilians). The planes never saw action in the role, and were replaced with He 100s and then exported.

== Japan ==
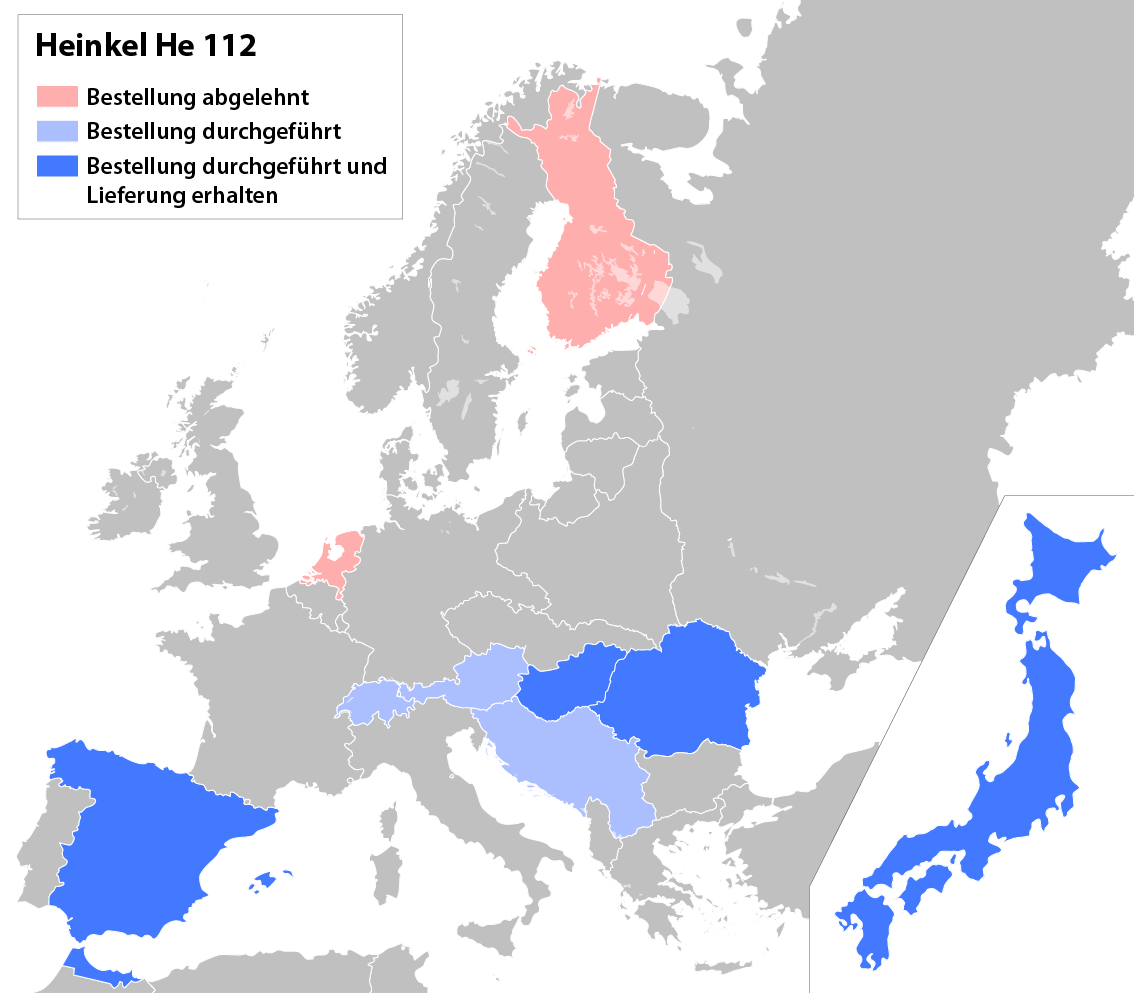

In 1937 the Japanese Imperial Navy found itself at a disadvantage in combat over the mainland China. The fact that Navy aircraft were fighting over the mainland might seem odd, but interservice rivalry in Japan went beyond the occasional bar brawl and both services fielded complete air forces with their own types of planes.

At the time the Navy air services were small and equipped mostly with older biplanes. Meanwhile, the Soviets were supplying the Chinese air forces with the Polikarpov I-15bis and Polikarpov I-16 fighters. Although the new Mitsubishi A5M was largely similar to the I-16, they were just starting to enter service and available in small numbers only. The Navy was concerned about the lack of fighters and went looking for new designs that could be purchased off the shelf to bring the squadrons to strength quickly. At the time the majority of modern design work was taking place in Europe, and with England no longer on friendly terms, they turned to Germany for a new fighter.

In late 1937 a delegation visited the Heinkel plant in Marienehe and saw V9 in action. They were impressed and placed an order for thirty of the B series planes, with an option for 100 more. They even purchased one of the older designs to take back with them immediately (according to the primary source below, this was the V5). Upon arriving in Japan the planes were named A7He1, the A7 refers to the 7th navy fighter design (the Mitsubishi Zero was 6th), and the He1 means it is the first version of this particular design, built by Heinkel.

In testing the He 112B proved superior to the A5M2 in many ways, notably in speed where the 112 could easily outrun the A5M by 65 km/h. Yet the test pilots rejected the plane out of hand because the A5M was more maneuverable. Maneuverability was considered to be the single most important factor for any fighter among the IJN pilots; everything and anything was sacrificed to improve it. It could be said that the Japanese were still fighting World War I in the air, and the focus on maneuverability would later prove to be the downfall of their air forces.

In the end the He 112 was rejected and the option for the additional 100 was canceled. The thirty already purchased were delivered over a period in 1937 and '38, drawn from a number of production runs. Upon arriving in Japan they were used for training duties, but the V11 with its DB600Aa was used for testing. As it turns out the A7 designation would later be assigned to the Mitsubishi A7M, a high performance successor of the Zero which never saw combat.

Although Japan phased the A7He1 out of service before the attack on Pearl Harbor in December 1941, the Allies assumed it still was in use during World War II and assigned the reporting name Jerry to it.

== Spain ==
When V9 was sent to Spain in the spring of 1938 it was primarily as a sales effort to interest the Spanish in the He 112 design. It was flown by a number of Spanish pilots in various test and show flights. The pilots reports all praised the plane, but at the same time they all considered it to be underpowered.

Nevertheless, the government decided to purchase the He 112 B and form up a new group under the command of Comandante José Muñoz Jiménez. An order was placed for twelve planes and they started to arrive in November 1938, where they were assembled in León by Heinkel workers. The first two were ready by December, followed by another seven B-1s and ten B-2s in early 1939.

The first seven aircraft were ready by the end of January, and were formed up as 2^{a} Escuadra Grupo de Caza 5-G-5 (2nd Squadron of Fighter Group 5-G-5). When another eight were completed the 1^{a} Escuadra was formed up as well, and the remaining four were split among them as they became available.

1^{a} Escuadra lasted only a short time before they were re-equipped with Bf 109 B and Bf 109 C handed down from the Legión Cóndor as they received their new Bf 109 E. Grupo 5-G-5 was then incorporated into 7^{a} Escuadra de Caza (7th Fighter Regiment) along with 2-G-2 and 3-G-3 with their Fiat CR.32 biplanes. The He 112s were to operate as top cover over the Fiats, which had considerably worse altitude performance.

Operations started on 17 January 1939, and on the 20th the operational plan proved sound when they encountered a number of I-16s over Igualada. The squadron commanding officer, Capitán García Pardo shot one down for his 12th kill, but this would prove to be the only air-to-air victory for the He 112 for the war. From then on they operated almost solely in the ground attack role and moved about the country as the war wound down, sometimes rejoining 1^{a} Escuadra. Two aircraft and their pilots were lost in careless accidents during this time, but it appears none were lost in combat.

The civil war ended on 1 April, leaving Spain with one of the most powerful and modern air forces in the world. 2^{a} Escuadra returned to Léon where they had started off, but on 13 July they were moved to Sania Ramel in Spanish Morocco. Here they were renamed 1^{a} Escuadra and joined a newly formed 2^{a} Escuadra flying the new Fiat G.50s (still no match for the 112s). Together they formed Grupo 27.

When Allied forces landed in North Africa, the Spanish forces in Morocco found themselves once again on alert. Due to the navigational difficulties of the day, they found themselves repeatedly intercepting straying aircraft from both Allied and German forces. For instance, on 8 November they intercepted C-47s dropping US paratroopers on Morocco by mistake. On other occasions they intercepted Spitfire Vs from Gibraltar, and Dewoitine D.520s operated by the Vichy French out of Algeria. None of these incidents resulted in losses.

On 3 March 1943 a formation of Allied planes was seen straying into Spanish airspace yet again, and Grupo 27's alert plane was scrambled with Teniente Miguel Entrena Klett at the controls. After climbing to 3500 m, he spotted the target aircraft and identified them as eleven Lockheed P-38s. He then positioned for an attack out of the sun (which was to the rear of the formation) and made a diving pass on the trail-end aircraft. Several hits were made with the 20 mm rounds (his MGs were later discovered to be unloaded), and the plane started trailing smoke and was forced down on the eastern bank of the Mouluya river, in Algeria.

By 1944 the planes found themselves sitting on the ground more and more due to a lack of fuel and maintenance. By 1945 there were only nine left, and they were rotated out of service for repairs in Spain. They continued to be atrophied due to accidents and cannibalization over the next few years, eventually returning to the mainland and being assigned to training units (where they rarely flew). The last airworthy example appears on the books in 1952, along with another that could not fly. The next year there were none listed.

== Hungary ==
Like the Germans, Hungary had stiff regulations imposed on her armed forces with the signing of the Peace Treaty of Versailles. In August 1938 the armed forces were re-formed, and with Austria (historically her partner for centuries) being incorporated into Germany, Hungary found itself in the German sphere.

One of the highest priorities for the forces was to re-equip the Royal Hungarian Air Force (MKHL) as soon as possible. Of the various planes being looked at the 112B eventually won out over the competition, and on September 7 an order was placed for 36 planes. At that point, the Heinkel production line was just starting, and with Japan and Spain in the queue before them it would be some time before the planes could start delivery. Repeated pleas to be moved to the top of the queue failed.

Germany had to refuse the first order at the beginning of 1939 because of its claimed neutrality in the Hungarian/Romanian dispute over Transylvania. In addition the German Ministry of Aviation (RLM) refused to license the Oerlikon 20 mm MG FF cannon to the Hungarians, likely as a form of political pressure. This latter insult did not cause a problem, because they planned to replace it with the locally designed Danuvia 20 mm cannon anyway.

V9 was sent to Hungary as a demonstrator after a tour of Romania, and arrived on 5 February 1939. It was test flown by a number of pilots over the next week, and on the 14th they replaced the propeller with a new three bladed Junkers design (licensed from Hamilton). While being tested against a CR.32 that day, V9 crashed. On 10 March a new 112B-1/U2 arrived to replace the V9, and was flown by a number of pilots from different fighter units. It was during this time that the Hungarian pilots started to complain about the underpowered engine, as they found that they could only reach a top speed of 430 km/h (267 mph) with the 210Ea.

With the Japanese and Spanish orders filled, things were looking up for Hungary. However at that point Romania placed its order, and was placed at the front of the queue. It appeared that the Hungarian production machines might never arrive, so the MKHL started pressing for a license to build the plane locally. In May the Hungarian Manfred-Weiss company in Budapest received the license for the plane, and on 1 June an order was placed for twelve planes. Heinkel agreed to deliver a 210Ga powered plane to serve as a pattern aircraft.

As it turns out the B-2 was never delivered, and two more of the B-1/U2s with the 210Ea were sent instead. On arrival in Hungary the 7.9 mm MG17s were removed and replaced with the local 8 mm 39.M machine guns, and bomb racks were added. The resulting fit was similar to those originally ordered by Austria. Throughout this time the complaints about the engines were being addressed by continued attempts to license one of the newer 30 litre class engines, the Junkers Jumo 211A or the DB600Aa.

Late in March the He 100 V8 took the world absolute speed record, but in stories about the record attempt the plane was referred to as the He 112U. Upon hearing of the record, the Hungarians decided to switch production to this "new version" of the 112, which was based on the newer engines. Then in August the Commander-in-Chief of the MKHL recommended that the 112 be purchased as the standard fighter for Hungary (although likely referring to the earlier versions, not the "112U").

At this point the engine issue came to a head. It was clear that no production line planes would ever reach Hungary, and now that the war was underway the RLM was refusing to allow their export anyway. Shipments of the Jumo 211 or DB601 were not even able to fulfill German needs, so export of the engine for locally built airframes was likewise out of the question.

By September the ongoing negotiations with the RLM for the license to build the engines locally stalled, and as a result the MKHL ordered Manfred-Weiss to stop tooling up for the production line aircraft. The license was eventually canceled in December. At that point the MKHL turned to the Italians, and purchased the Fiat CR.32 and Reggiane Re.2000 Falco I. The latter would be the backbone of the MKHL for much of the war.

Nevertheless, the three B-1/U2 aircraft continued to serve on. In the summer of 1940 tensions with Romania over Transylvania started to heat up again and the entire MKHL was placed on alert on 27 June. On 21 August the 112s were moved forward to the Debrecen airfield to protect a vital railway link. The next week a peaceful resolution was found, and the settlement was signed in Vienna on 30 August. The 112s returned home the following week.

By 1941 the planes were ostensibly assigned to defend the Manfred-Weiss plant, but were actually used for training. When the Allied bomber raids started in the spring of 1944 the planes were no longer airworthy, and it appears all were destroyed in a massive raid on the Budapest-Ferihegy airport on 9 August.

After the licensed production of the 112B fell through in 1939, the plan was to switch the production line to build a Manfred-Weiss designed plane called the W.M.23 Ezüst Nyíl (Silver Arrow). The plane was basically a 112B adapted to local construction; the wings were wooden versions of the 112s planform, the fuselage was made of a plywood over a steel frame, and the engine was a licensed built version of the 1000 hp class Gnome-Rhone Mistral-Major radial engine.

It would seem that this "simplified" plane would be inferior to the 112, but in fact the higher powered engine made all the difference and the W.M.23 proved to be considerably faster than the 112. Nevertheless, work proceeded slowly and only one prototype was built. The project was eventually canceled outright when the prototype crashed in early 1942. It is still a mystery why so little work had been done in those two years on what appeared to be an excellent design.

== Romania ==
At the end of World War I, Romania was granted large tracts of land as a reward for siding with the Allies. These lands were taken as penalties from surrounding countries, making instant enemies of the USSR, Bulgaria, and Hungary. Throughout the 1920s and 1930s, Romania entered a number of alliances with nearby nations in similar situations, notably Czechoslovakia and Yugoslavia. They were interested in blocking any changes to the Treaty of Versailles, that could eventually lead the loss of the land grants.

Germany looked on Romania as an important supplier of war materials, notably oil and grain. Looking to secure Romania as an ally, throughout the middle of the 1930s Germany placed increasing amounts of pressure on them in a variety of forms, best summed up as the "carrot and stick" approach. The carrot came in the form of generous trade agreements for a variety of products and by the late 1930s Germany formed about half of all of Romania's trade. The stick came in the form of Germany siding with Romania's enemies in various disputes.

On 26 June 1940, the Soviet Union gave Romania a twenty-four-hour ultimatum to return Bessarabia and cede northern Bukovina – the latter had never even been a part of Russia. Germany's ambassador to Romania advised the king to submit, and he did. In August Bulgaria reclaimed southern Dobruja with German and Soviet backing. Later that month German and Italian foreign ministers met with Romanian diplomats in Vienna and presented them with an ultimatum to accept the ceding of northern Transylvania to Hungary.

Romania was placed in an increasingly bad position as her local allies were gobbled up by Germany, and her larger allies (Britain and France) assurances of help proved empty when they did nothing during the invasion of Poland. Soon the king was forced from the throne and a pro-German government was formed.

With Romania now firmly in the German sphere of influence, her efforts to re-arm for the coming war were suddenly strongly backed. The primary concern was the air force, the FARR. Their fighter force at the time consisted of just over 100 Polish PZL P.11 aircraft, primarily the P.11B or the locally modified F model, and P.24E. Although these aircraft had been the most advanced fighters in the world in the early 1930s, by the late 1930s they were hopelessly outclassed by practically everything.

In April 1939 the FARR was offered the Bf 109 as soon as production was meeting German demands, in the meantime they could take over 24 112Bs that were already built. The FARR jumped at the chance and then increased the order to thirty planes.

Late in April a group of Romanian pilots arrived at Heinkel for conversion training, which went slowly because of the advanced nature of the 112 compared to the PZL. When the training was complete, the pilots returned home in the cockpits of their new aircraft. The planes, all of them B-1s or B-2s, were delivered in this manner starting in July and ending in October. During that time two of the planes were lost, one in a fatal accident during training in Germany on 7 September, and another suffered minor damage on landing while being delivered, and was later repaired at SET in Romania.

When the first planes started arriving, they were tested competitively against the locally designed IAR.80 prototype. This interesting and little-known plane proved to be superior to the 112B in almost every way. At the same time the test flights demonstrated a number of disadvantages of the 112 in general, notably the underpowered engine and poor speed. The result of the fly-off was that the IAR.80 was ordered into immediate production, and orders for any additional He 112s were cancelled.

By 15 September enough of the planes had arrived and the Escadrila 10 and 11 were re-equipped with the 112. The two squadrons were formed into the Grupul 5 vânãtoare (5th Fighter Group), responsible for the defense of Bucharest. In October they were renamed the 51st and 52nd squadrons, still forming the 5th. The pilots had not been a part of the group that had been trained at Heinkel, so they started working their way toward the 112 using Nardi F.N.305 monoplane trainers. Training lasted until the spring of 1940, when a single additional 112B-2 was delivered as a replacement for the one that crashed in Germany the previous September.

During the troubles with Hungary the 51st was deployed to Transylvania. Hungarian Ju-86s and He-70s started making reconnaissance flights over Romanian territory. Repeated attempts to intercept them failed because of the 112's low speed. On 27 August Locotenent Nicolae Polizu was over Hungarian territory when he encountered a Caproni Ca.135bis bomber flying on a training mission. Several of his 20 mm rounds hit the bomber, which was forced down safely at the Hungarian Debrecen airbase, home to the Hungarian 112s. Polizu became the first Romanian to shoot down a plane in aerial combat.

When Germany prepared to invade the USSR in 1941, Romania joined them in an effort to regain the territories lost the year before. The FARR was made part of Luftflotte 4 and, in preparation for the invasion, Grupul 5 vânãtoare was sent to Moldavia. At the time twenty four of the 112s were flyable. Three were left at their home base at Pipera to complete repairs, two others had been lost to accidents, and the others fate is unknown. On 15 June the planes moved again, to Foscani-North in northern Moldavia.

With the opening of the war on the 22nd, the 112s were in the air at 10:50 am supporting an attack by Potez 63s of Grupul 2 bombardment on the Soviet airfields at Bolgrad and Bulgãrica. Although some flak was encountered on the way to and over Bolgrad, the attack was successful and a number of Soviet planes were bombed on the ground. By the time they reached Bulgãrica fighters were in the air waiting for them, and as a result the twelve 112s were met by about thirty I-16s. The results of this combat were mixed; Sublocotenent Teodor Moscu shot down one of a pair of I-16s still taking off. When he was pulling out he hit another in a head-on pass and it crashed into the Danube. He was set upon by several I-16s and received several hits, his fuel tanks were punctured but did not seal. Losing fuel rapidly, he formed up with his wingman and managed to put down at the Romanian airfield at Bâlad. His plane was later repaired and returned to duty. Of the bombers, three of the thirteen dispatched were shot down.

Over the next few days the 112s would be used primarily as ground attack aircraft, where their heavy armament was considered to be more important than their ability to fight air-to-air. Typical missions would start before dawn and would have the Heinkels strafe Soviet airbases. Later in the day they would be sent on search and destroy missions, looking primarily for artillery and trains.

Losses were heavy, most not due to combat, but simply because the planes were flying an average of three missions a day and were not receiving the maintenance they needed. This problem effected all of the FARR, who did not have the field maintenance logistics worked out at the time. On 29 July a report on the readiness of the air forces listed only fourteen 112s in flyable condition, and another eight repairable. As a result, the planes of the 52nd were folded into the 51st to form a single full strength squadron on 13 August. The men of the 52nd were merged with the 42nd who flew IAR.80s, and were soon sent home to receive IAR.80s of their own. A report from August on the 112 rated it very poorly, once again noting its lack of power and poor speed.

For a time the 51st continued in a front-line role, although they saw little combat. When Odessa fell on 16 October the Romanian war effort ostensibly ended, and the planes were considered to be no longer needed at the front. Fifteen were kept at Odessa and the rest were released to Romania for training duty (although they seem to have seen no use). On 1 November the 51st moved to Tatarka and then returned to Odessa on the 25th, performing coastal patrol duties all the while. On 1 July 1942, the 51st returned to Pipera and stood down after a year in action.

On July 19 one of the He 112s took to air to intercept Soviet bombers in what was the first night mission by a Romanian plane. As the Soviets were clearly gearing up for a night offensive on Bucharest, the 51st was then re-equipped with Me 110 night fighters and became the only Romanian night fighter squadron.

By 1943 the IAR.80 was no longer competitive, and the FARR started an overdue move to a newer fighter. The fighter in this case was the barely competitive Bf 109G. The 112s found themselves actively being used in the training role at last. The inline engine and general layout of the German designs was considered similar enough to make it useful in this role, and as a result the 112s came under the control of the Corpul 3 Aerian (3rd Air Corps). Several more of the 112s were destroyed in accidents during this time. It soldiered on in this role into late 1944, even after Romania had changed sides and joined the Allies.
