= Andreyevo, Kishertsky District, Perm Krai =

Andreyevo Андреево
- Selo
- Location within Perm Krai Location within Russia
- Coordinates: 57°23′N 57°25′E
- Country: Russia
- Region: Perm Krai
- District: Kishertsky District
- Time zone: UTC+5:00

Andreyevo (Russian: Андреево) is a rural locality (a selo) and the administrative center of Andreyevskoye Rural Settlement, Kishertsky District, Perm Krai, Russia. The population was 457 as of 2010. There are 14 streets.

== Geography ==
Andreyevo is located 13 km west of Ust-Kishert (the district's administrative centre) by road. Karakosovo is the nearest rural locality.
