= Solyanka (river) =

River in Perm Krai, Russia

Physical characteristics
- Mouth
  - location: Babka
- Length: 13 km (8.1 mi)

Basin features
- Progression: Babka→ Sylva→ Chusovaya→ Kama→ Volga→ Caspian Sea

The Solyanka (Russian: Солянка) is a river in Perm Krai, Russia, a right tributary of the Babka, which in turn is a tributary of the Sylva. The river is 13 kilometres (8 mi) long.
