= Posad, Kishertsky District, Perm Krai =

Posad Посад
- Selo
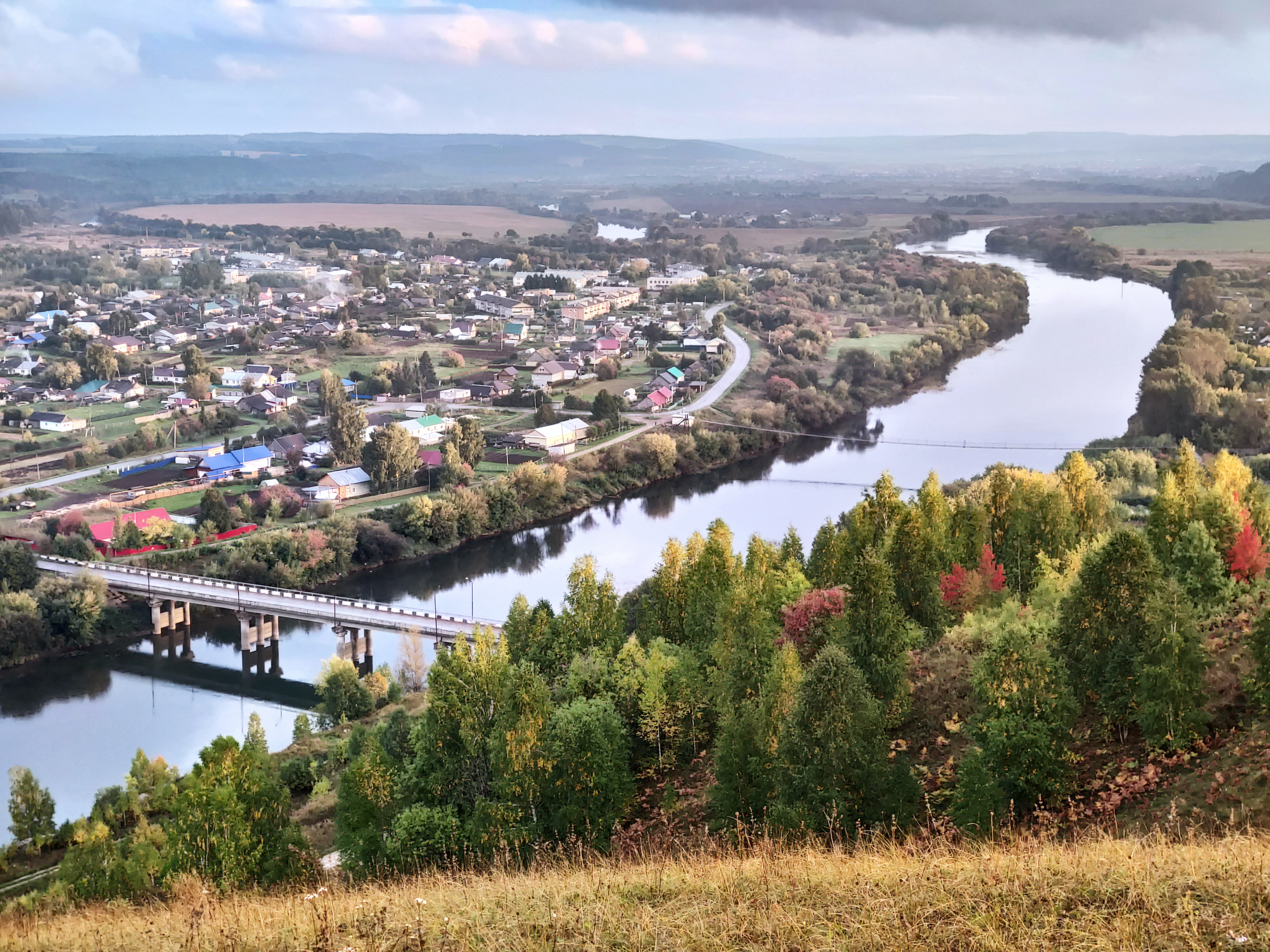

- Location within Perm Krai Location within Russia
- Coordinates: 57°25′N 57°36′E
- Country: Russia
- Region: Perm Krai
- District: Kishertsky District
- Time zone: UTC+5:00

Posad (Russian: Посад) is a rural locality (a selo) and the administrative center of Posadskoye Rural Settlement, Kishertsky District, Perm Krai, Russia. The population was 1,268 as of 2010. There are 18 streets.

== Geography ==
Posad is located 8 km north of Ust-Kishert (the district's administrative centre) by road. Fomichi is the nearest rural locality.
