= Kuara (river) =

Physical characteristics
- Mouth: Vogulka
  - coordinates: 57°05′14″N 58°33′55″E
- Length: 27 km (17 mi)
- Basin size: 186 km^{2} (72 sq mi)

Basin features
- Progression: Vogulka→ Sylva→ Chusovaya→ Kama→ Volga→ Caspian Sea

The Kuara (Russian: Куара) is a river in Sverdlovsk Oblast, Russia, a right tributary of the Vogulka, which in turn is a tributary of the Sylva. The Kuara is 27 kilometres (17 mi) long, and its drainage basin covers 186 square kilometres (72 mi^{2}). Main tributaries: Bolshoy Miass and Miass (right).
