= Garino =

Garino is a surname. Notable people with the surname include:

- Emmanuelle Bayamack-Tam, née Emmanuelle Garino (born 1966), French writer
- Patricio Garino (born 1993), Argentine basketball player
- Silvia Garino (born 1998), Italian badminton player

== See also ==
- Marino (name)
- Garino, Perm Krai, a village in Russia
