= Irgina =

River in Perm Krai, Russia

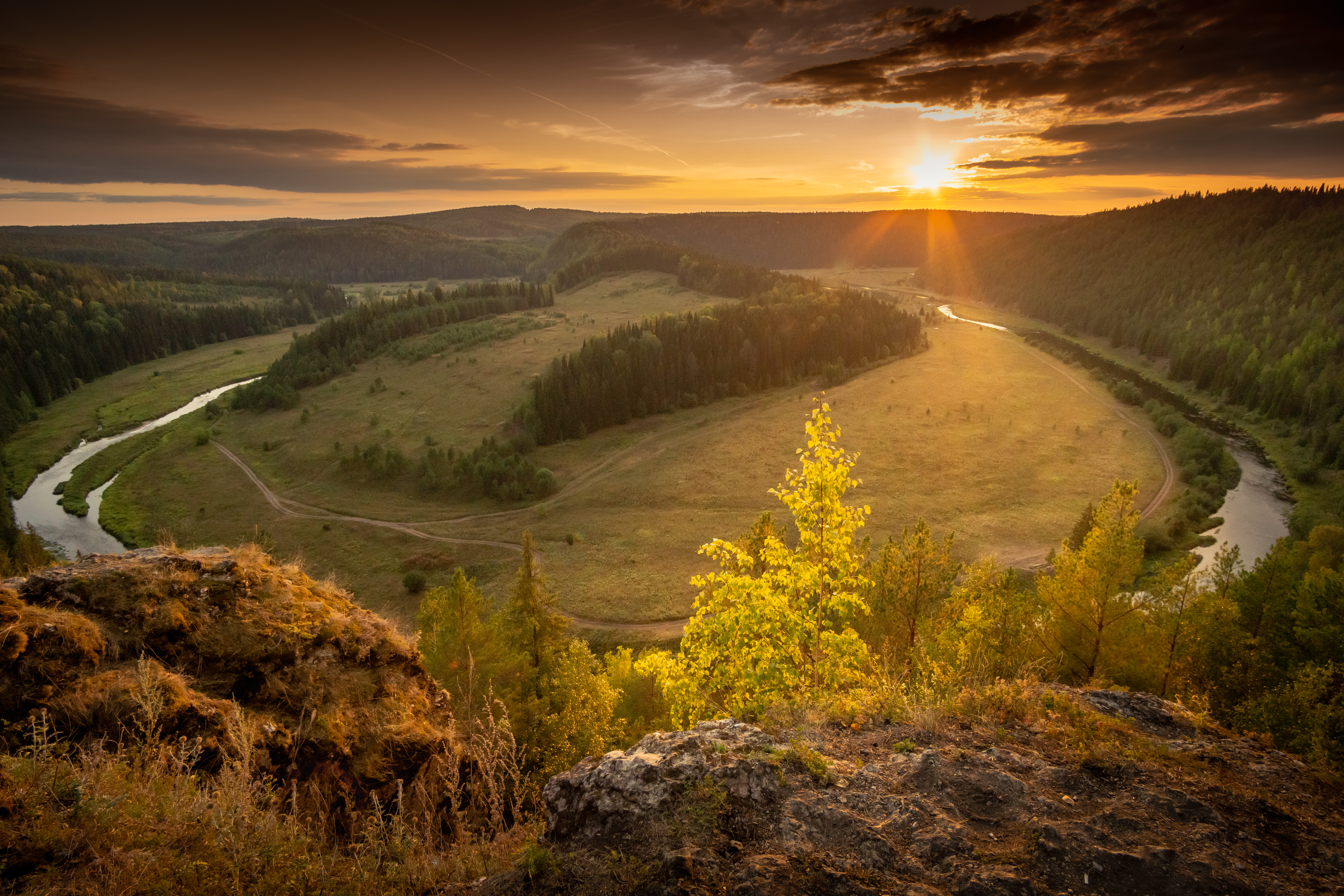

Physical characteristics
- Mouth
  - location: Sylva
  - coordinates: 57°03′36″N 57°30′39″E
- Length: 91 km (57 mi)
- Basin size: 1,150 km^{2} (440 sq mi)

Basin features
- Progression: Sylva→ Chusovaya→ Kama→ Volga→ Caspian Sea

The Irgina (Russian: Иргина) is a river in Perm Krai and Sverdlovsk Oblast, Russia, a left tributary of the Sylva, which in turn is a tributary of the Chusovaya. The river is 91 kilometres (57 mi) long, with a drainage basin of 1,150 square kilometres (440 mi^{2}). Main tributaries: Shurtan (left), Turysh (right).
