= Babka (river) =

River in Perm Krai, Russia

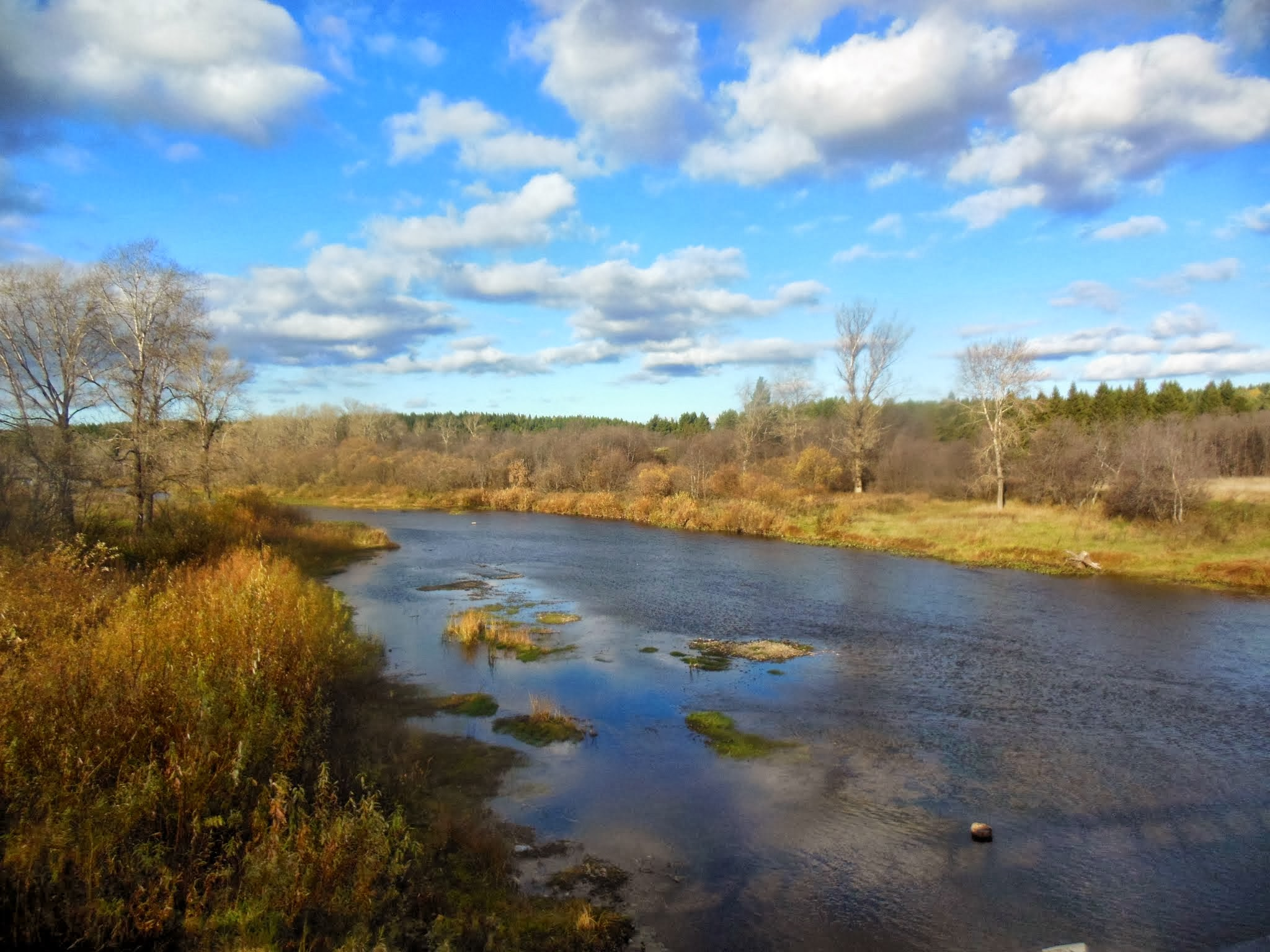

Physical characteristics
- Mouth: Sylva
  - coordinates: 57°28′07″N 56°53′11″E
- Length: 162 km (101 mi)
- Basin size: 2,090 km^{2} (810 sq mi)

Basin features
- Progression: Sylva→ Chusovaya→ Kama→ Volga→ Caspian Sea

The Babka (Russian: Бабка) is a river in Perm Krai, Russia, a left tributary of the Sylva which in turn is a tributary of the Chusovaya. The river is 162 kilometres (101 mi) long, and its drainage basin covers 2,090 square kilometres (810 mi^{2}). It flows through Kungursky and Permsky districts. Main tributaries: Tatarka, Yumysh, Platoshinka, Kushtanka, Byrma, Bizyarka, Sukhobizyarka, Yelymovka, Solyanka and Kotlovka.
