= Vogulka =

Physical characteristics
- Mouth: Sylva
  - coordinates: 57.3353°N 58.1973°E
- Length: 113 km (70 mi)
- Basin size: 983 km^{2} (380 sq mi)

Basin features
- Progression: Sylva→ Chusovaya→ Kama→ Volga→ Caspian Sea

The Vogulka (Russian: Вогулка) is a river in Sverdlovsk Oblast, Russia, a left tributary of Sylva which in turn is a tributary of Chusovaya. The river is 113 kilometres (70 mi) long, and its drainage basin covers 983 square kilometres (380 mi^{2}). The main tributaries are the Maly Lip, Bolshoy Lip, Biz, Yurmys, and Kuara (right).
