= Nevidimka =

Nevidimka Невидимка
- Settlement
- Location within Perm Krai Location within Russia
- Coordinates: 58°00′N 57°53′E
- Country: Russia
- Region: Perm Krai
- District: Lysva
- Time zone: UTC+5:00

Nevidimka (Russian: Невидимка) is a rural locality (a settlement) in Lysva, Perm Krai, Russia. The population was 890 as of 2010. There are 14 streets.

== Geography ==
Nevidimka is located 13 km south of Lysva (the district's administrative centre) by road. Verkh-Lysva is the nearest rural locality.
