= Solyanka (disambiguation) =

Solyanka is a thick, spicy, and sour soup in Eastern European cuisine.

Solyanka may also refer to:

- Solyanka (river), a river in Perm Krai, Russia
- Solyanka (rural locality), several rural localities in Russia
