= Tatarka (Babka) =

River in Perm Krai, Russia

Physical characteristics
- Mouth
  - location: Babka
- Length: 12 km (7.5 mi)

Basin features
- Progression: Babka→ Sylva→ Chusovaya→ Kama→ Volga→ Caspian Sea

The Tatarka (Russian: Татарка) is a river in Perm Krai, Russia, a right bank tributary of the Babka, which in turn is a tributary of the Sylva. The river is 12 kilometres (7.5 mi) long.
