= Garino, Perm Krai =

Garino Гарино
- Village
- Location within Perm Krai Location within Russia
- Coordinates: 57°20′N 57°15′E
- Country: Russia
- Region: Perm Krai
- District: Kishertsky District
- Time zone: UTC+5:00

Garino (Russian: Гарино) is a rural locality (a village) in Kishertskoye Rural Settlement, Kishertsky District, Perm Krai, Russia. The population was 74 as of 2010.

== Geography ==
Garino is located 4 km southeast of Ust-Kishert (the district's administrative centre) by road. Ust-Kishert is the nearest rural locality.
