= Kuara (disambiguation) =

Kuara may refer to:

- Kuara, the god of thunder in Turkic Shamanism also known as Kvara
- Kuara, an ancient Sumerian city located in modern-day Iraq
- Kuara, West Bengal, a village in West Bengal
- Kuara (river), a river in Sverdlovsk Oblast, Russia
