= Barda (river) =

River in Perm Krai, Russia

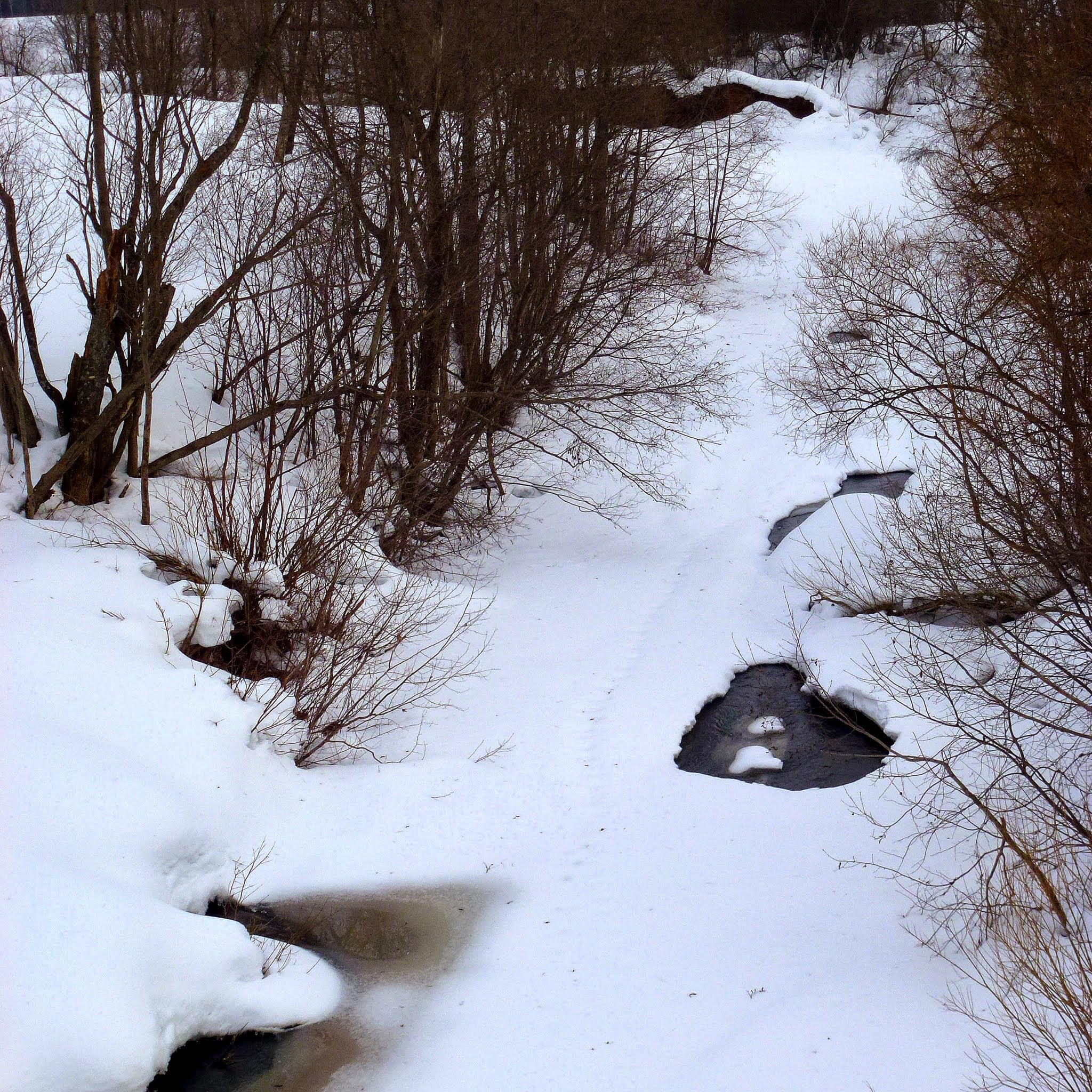

Location
- Country: Russia

Physical characteristics
- Mouth: Sylva
  - coordinates: 57°23′13″N 57°23′7″E
- Length: 209 km (130 mi)
- Basin size: 1,970 km^{2} (760 sq mi)

Basin features
- Progression: Sylva→ Chusovaya→ Kama→ Volga→ Caspian Sea

The Barda (Russian: Барда) is a river in Perm Krai, Russia, a right tributary of Sylva. The river is 209 kilometres (130 mi) long. The area of its drainage basin is 1,970 square kilometres (760 mi^{2}). The source of the river is west of Kyn railway station. The Barda flows through Lysvensky urban okrug, Beryozovsky District and Kishertsky District of the krai and flows into the Sylva 83 kilometres (52 mi) from its mouth. Main tributaries: Tersi, Asovka (left); Kamenka (right).
