= Fomichi, Kishertsky District, Perm Krai =

Fomichi Фомичи
- Village
- Location within Perm Krai Location within Russia
- Coordinates: 57°24′N 57°16′E
- Country: Russia
- Region: Perm Krai
- District: Kishertsky District
- Time zone: UTC+5:00

Fomichi (Russian: Фомичи) is a rural locality (a village) in Posadskoye Rural Settlement, Kishertsky District, Perm Krai, Russia. The population was 80 as of 2010. There are 6 streets.

== Geography ==
Fomichi is located 8 km northeast of Ust-Kishert (the district's administrative centre) by road. Rogozino is the nearest rural locality.
