= Molyobka, Kishertsky District, Perm Krai =

Rural locality in Kishertsky District, Perm Krai, Russia

Coordinates: 57°14′05″N 57°55′56″E

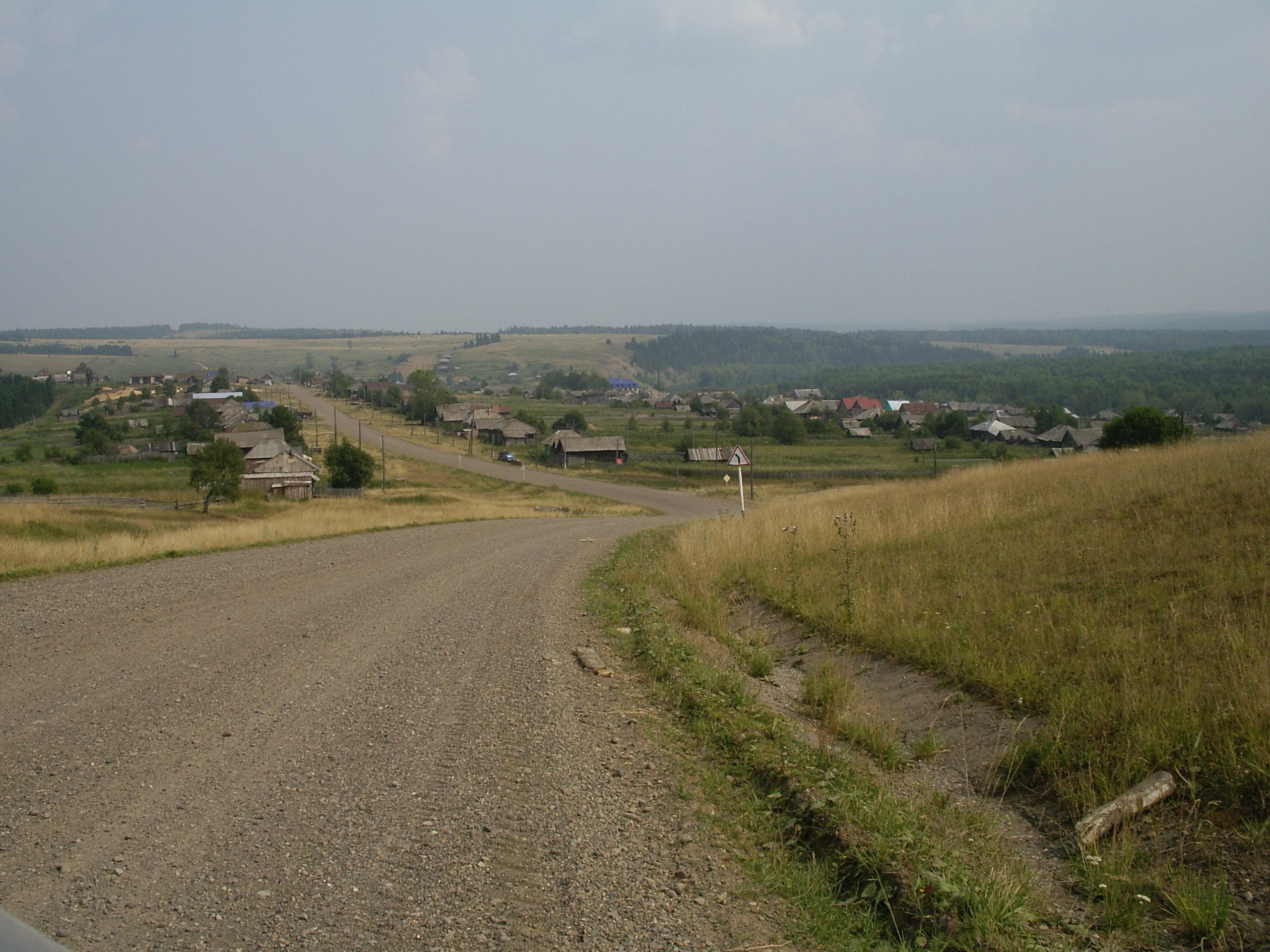
Molyobka Entrance

Molyobka (Russian: Молёбка) is a rural locality (selo) in Kishertsky District of Perm Krai, Russia, located on the bank of the Sylva River at its confluence with the Molyobka River. Population: 374 (2002).

The village's history began with the foundation of the Molyobka factory by the Russian magnate Demidov in 1787. The factory was active until in 1904 the depletion of local ore mines prompted its closure. Nevertheless, a bloody battle for the factory had taken place during the Civil War.

In the 1990s, Molyobka gained fame among UFO seekers due to presumable paranormal activities taking place in the so-called "Molyobka triangle".
