= Tatarca =

Tatarca may refer to:

- Tatarça, or Tatar, a Turkic language
- Tătarca, a village in Romania
- Tătarca River, a river in Romania

== See also ==
- Tatarka (disambiguation)
- Tatarşa (disambiguation)
