= Lysva (river) =

- Native name: Лысьва (Russian)

Location
- Country: Russia

Physical characteristics
- Mouth: Chusovaya
  - coordinates: 58.2989°N 57.6651°E
- Length: 112 km (70 mi)
- Basin size: 1,010 km^{2} (390 sq mi)

Basin features
- Progression: Chusovaya→ Kama→ Volga→ Caspian Sea

Lysva (Russian: Лысьва) is a river in Perm Krai, Russia. It is a left tributary of the Chusovaya, and is 112 kilometers (70 mi) long, with a drainage basin of 1,010 square kilometers (390 sq mi). By the river lies the town of Lysva.
