= Tatarşa =

Tatarşa may refer to:

- Tatarşa, native name of Dobrujan Tatar
- Tatarşa, noun for Tatar language in Kazakh

== See also ==
- Tatarka (disambiguation)
- Tatarca (disambiguation)
