= Tatarka =

Tatarka may refer to:

- Tatarka (musician), hip-hop artist from Tatarstan, Russia
- Tatarka, old name of Prilimanskoe, a village in Odesa Raion, Ukraine, site of the alleged WWII Tatarka common graves
- Tatarka, Kyiv, a neighbourhood in Kyiv, Ukraine
- several places with the name in Russia and Belarus, see be:Татарка and ru:Татарка
- Tatarka (Babka), a river in Russia
  - several other Russian rivers with the name, see ru:Татарка#Реки
- 286162 Tatarka, a minor planet
- Dominik Tatarka (1913–1989), Slovak author

== See also ==
- Tatarca (disambiguation)
- Tatarşa (disambiguation)
- Tatar (disambiguation)
