= Serebryanka, Gaynsky District =

Serebryanka Серебрянка
- Settlement
- Location within Perm Krai Location within Russia
- Coordinates: 60°29′N 53°24′E
- Country: Russia
- Region: Perm Krai
- District: Gaynsky District
- Time zone: UTC+5:00

Serebryanka (Russian: Серебрянка) is a rural locality (a settlement) in Gaynsky District, Perm Krai, Russia. The population was 631 in 2010. There are 17 streets.

== Geography ==
Serebryanka is located 63 km northwest of Gayny (the district's administrative centre) by road. Onyl is the nearest rural locality.
