= Serebryanka (Sverdlovsk Oblast) =

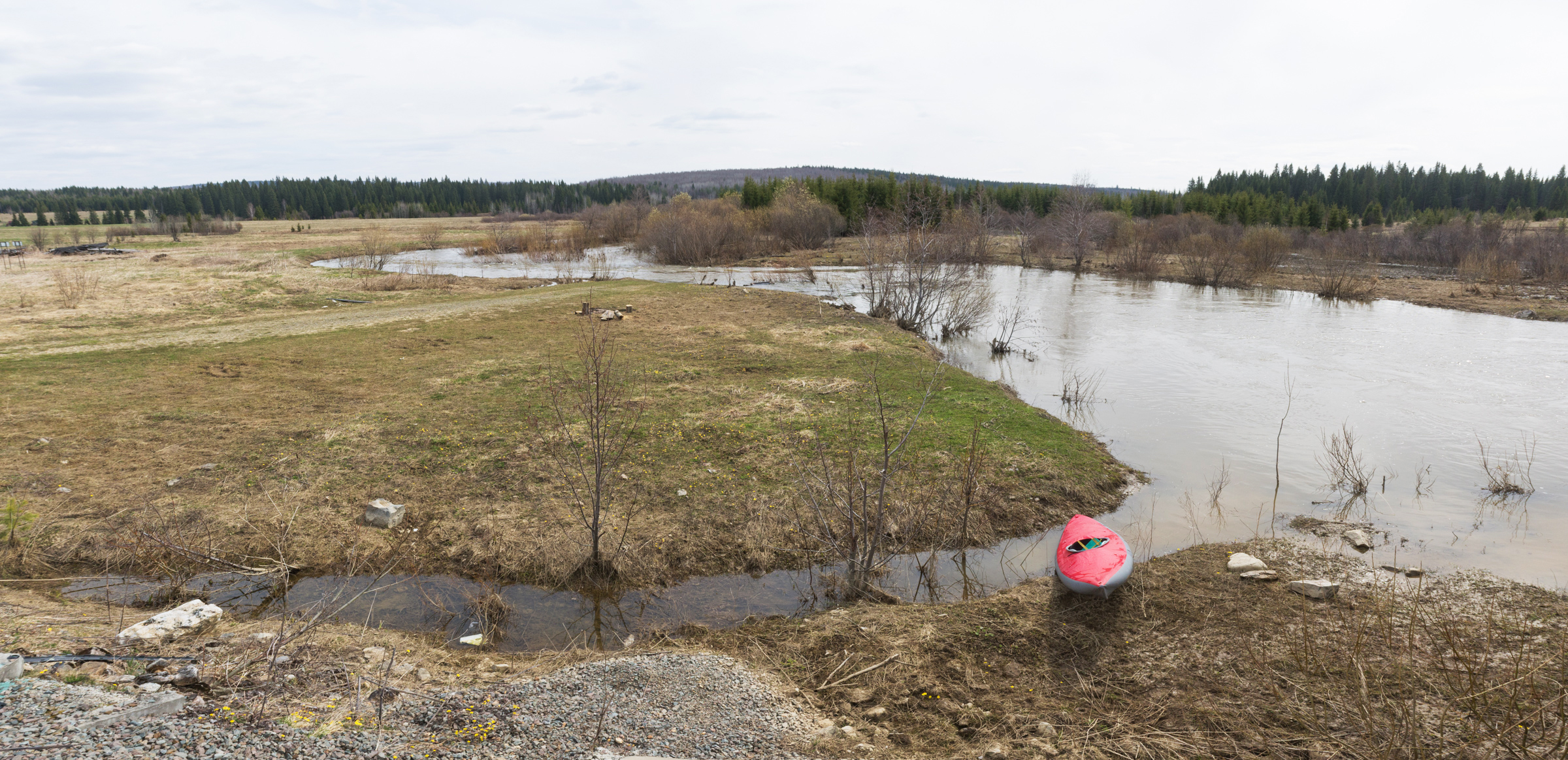
- Native name: Серебрянка (Russian)

Location
- Country: Russia

Physical characteristics
- Mouth: Chusovaya
  - coordinates: 57.8031°N 58.7739°E
- Length: 147 km (91 mi)
- Basin size: 1,240 km^{2} (480 sq mi)

Basin features
- Progression: Chusovaya→ Kama→ Volga→ Caspian Sea

The Serebryanka (Russian: Серебрянка, also: Серебряная - Serebryanaya) is a river in Sverdlovsk Oblast in Russia, a right tributary of the Chusovaya (Kama basin). The river is 147 kilometres (91 mi) long. The area of its drainage basin is 1,240 square kilometres (480 mi^{2}). The Serebryanka freezes up in November and stays icebound until April.
