= Molyobka, Beryozovsky District, Perm Krai =

Molyobka Молёбка
- Village
- Location within Perm Krai Location within Russia
- Coordinates: 57°31′N 57°42′E
- Country: Russia
- Region: Perm Krai
- District: Beryozovsky District
- Time zone: UTC+5:00

Molyobka (Russian: Молёбка) is a rural locality (a village) in Asovskoye Rural Settlement, Beryozovsky District, Perm Krai, Russia. The population was 44 as of 2010. There are 3 streets.

== Geography ==
Molyobka is located 29 km southeast of Beryozovka (the district's administrative centre) by road. Asovo is the nearest rural locality.
