= Andreyevo, Vladimir Oblast =

Andreyevo Андреево
- Settlement
- Location within Vladimir Oblast Location within Russia
- Coordinates: 55°56′N 41°09′E
- Country: Russia
- Region: Vladimir Oblast
- District: Sudogodsky District
- Time zone: UTC+3:00

Andreyevo (Russian: Андреево) is a rural locality (a settlement) and the administrative center of Andreyevskoye Rural Settlement, Sudogodsky District, Vladimir Oblast, Russia. The population was 3,470 (2021 census); 3,798 as of 2010. There are 31 streets.

== Geography ==
Andreyevo is located 21 km east of Sudogda (the district's administrative centre) by road. Tyurmerovka is the nearest rural locality.
