= Posad, Vereshchaginsky District =

Posad Посад
- Village
- Location within Perm Krai Location within Russia
- Coordinates: 58°03′N 54°23′E
- Country: Russia
- Region: Perm Krai
- District: Vereshchaginsky District
- Time zone: UTC+5:00

Posad (Russian: Посад) is a rural locality (a village) in Vereshchaginsky District, Perm Krai, Russia. The population was 45 as of 2010. There is 1 street.

== Geography ==
Posad is located 20 km west of Vereshchagino (the district's administrative centre) by road. Zapolye is the nearest rural locality.
