= Posad, Arkhangelsk Oblast =

Posad Посад
- Village
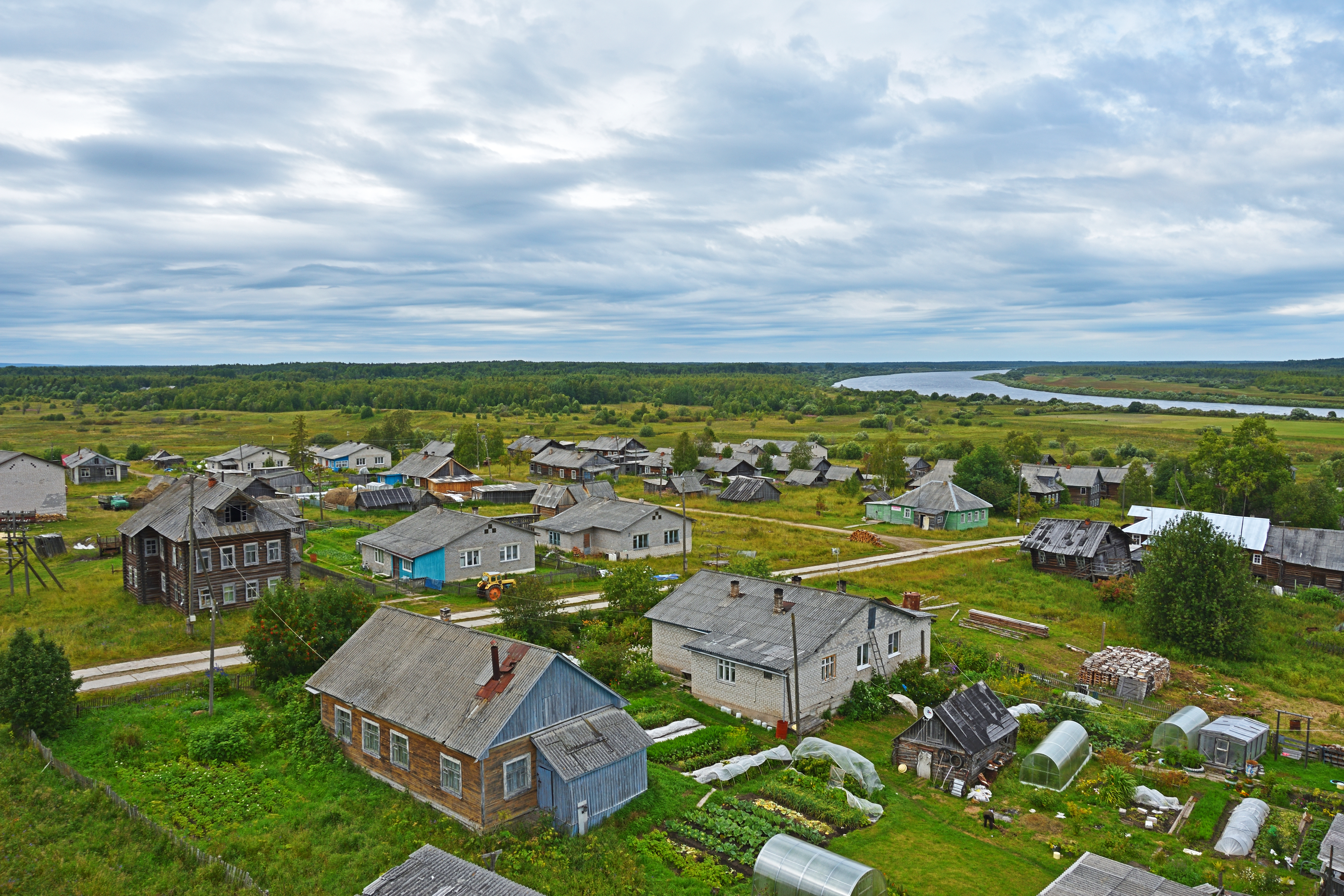

- Posad within Arkhangelsk Oblast Posad (Russia)
- Coordinates: 63°09′N 39°14′E
- Country: Russia
- Region: Arkhangelsk Oblast
- District: Onezhsky District
- Time zone: UTC+3:00 (MSK)

Posad (Russian: Посад) is a rural locality (a village) in Chekuyevskoye Rural Settlement of Onezhsky District, Arkhangelsk Oblast, Russia. The population was 119 as of 2010. There are 4 streets.

== Geography ==
Posad is located on the Onega River, 143 km southeast of Onega (the district's administrative centre) by road. Tselyagino is the nearest rural locality.
