= Lysva =

Town in Perm Krai, Russia

Lysva Лысьва
- Town
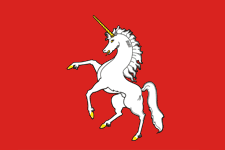
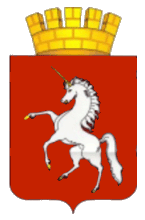
- Flag Coat of arms
- Interactive map of Lysva
- Location of Lysva Lysva (Perm Krai)
- Coordinates: 58°06′01″N 57°48′15″E
- Country: Russia
- Federal subject: Perm Krai
- Founded: 1785
- Elevation: 180 m (590 ft)

Population (2010 Census)
  - Total: 65,918
  - Estimate (2025): 52,258 (−20.7%)
  - Rank: 238th in 2010

Administrative status
  - Subordinated to: town of krai significance of Lysva
  - Capital of: town of krai significance of Lysva

Municipal status
  - Urban okrug: Lysvensky Urban Okrug
  - Capital of: Lysvensky Urban Okrug
- Time zone: UTC+5 (MSK+2)
- Postal code: 618900–618909
- OKTMO ID: 57726000001
- Website: www.molgp.ru

Lysva (Russian: Лысьва) is a town in Perm Krai, Russia, located in the eastern part of the krai on the river Lysva, 86 kilometers (53 mi) from Perm. Population: 65,918 (2010 census); 71,148 (2002 census); 76,614 (1989 Soviet census).

== History ==
Lysva as a settlement was known from the mid-17th century. In the second half of the 18th century, the lands around Lysva were inherited by Princess Varvara Shakhovskaya, the daughter of Baron Aleksander Stroganov. In 1785, construction of the cast-iron foundry began. This year is officially considered the founding year of Lysva. In 1902, owing to construction of the railway branch, the plant, which had been producing iron from the imported pig-iron by that time, obtained wide access to the country markets.

On 5 April 1926, the Presidium of the All-Russian Central Executive Committee granted Lysva city status. After the Great Patriotic War in Lysva began, development of mechanical engineering and light industry facilities began. In the 1950s, the centre of the city was rebuilt. From 1960 to 1980, the city extended its borders with the construction of new microdistricts.

In the 21st century, Lysva is one of the most important industrial and cultural centres of Perm Krai.

== Administrative and municipal status ==
Within the framework of administrative divisions, it is, together with fifty-nine rural localities, incorporated as the town of krai significance of Lysva—an administrative unit with the status equal to that of the districts. As a municipal division, the town of krai significance of Lysva is incorporated as Lysvensky Urban Okrug.

== Economy ==
The town's major industries are machine building and metalworking. Products manufactured by the town's workers include sheet iron, oil extraction equipment, and electric motors.

=== Transportation ===
There are non-electrified railway lines running through town to connect Lysva with Kalino station on the Gornozavodsk railway line.
