= Sylva (river) =

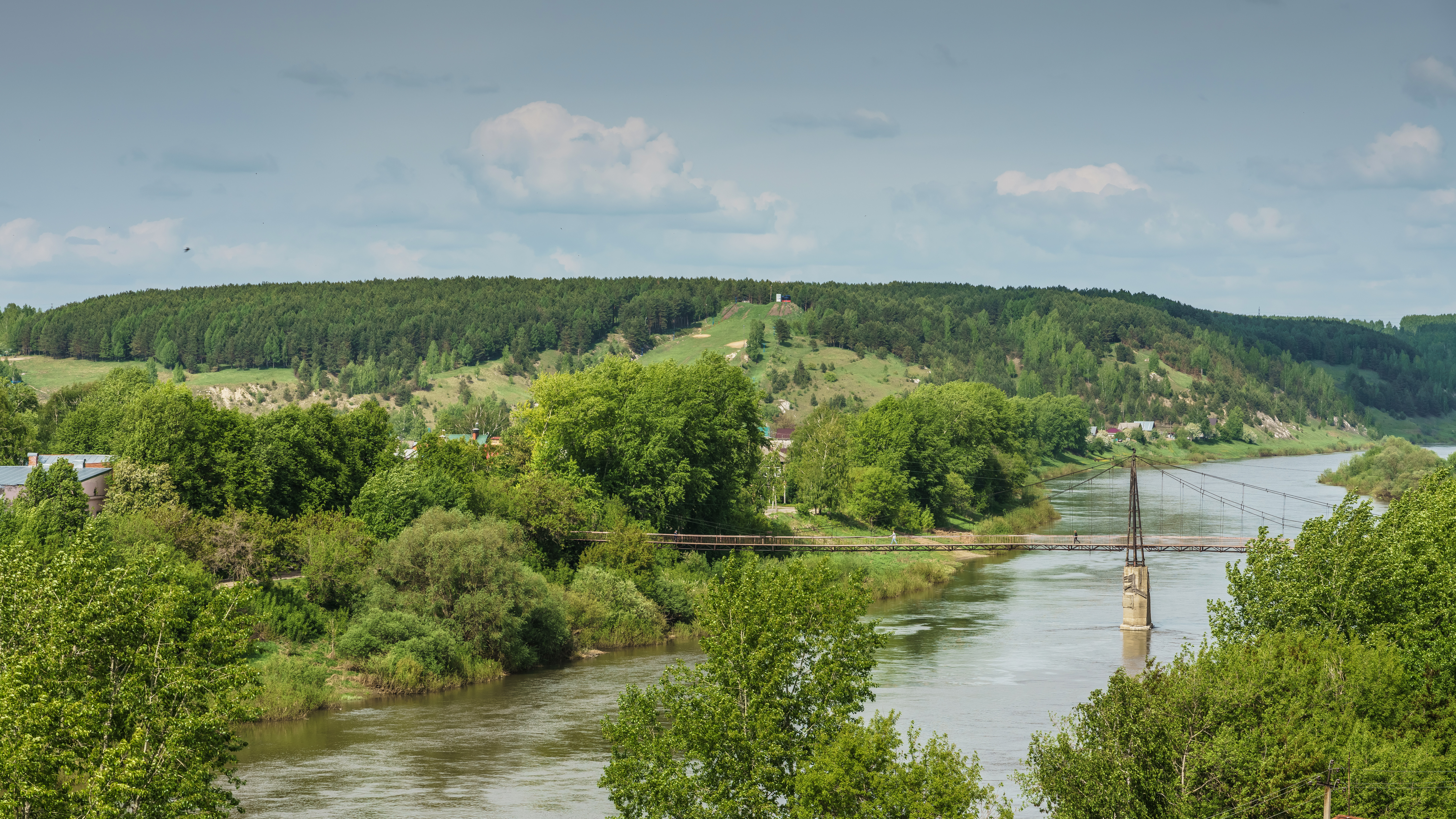
- River Sylva in the Urals

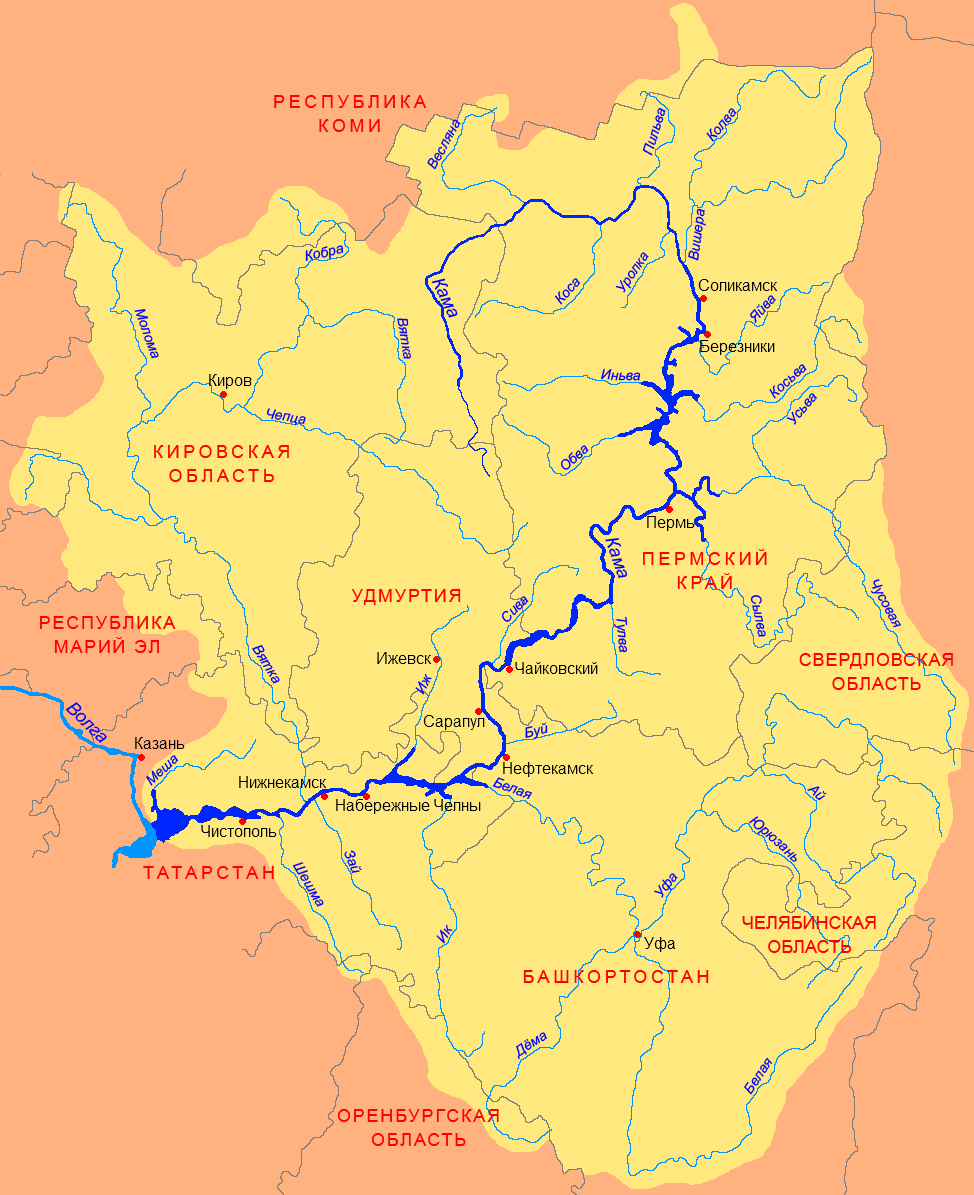
- Scheme of the Kama River Basin.

Location
- Country: Russia

Physical characteristics
- Source
  - location: Middle Urals
- Mouth
  - location: Chusovaya
  - coordinates: 58°06′28″N 56°38′16″E
- Length: 493 km (306 mi)
- Basin size: 19,700 km^{2} (7,600 sq mi)
- Discharge
  - average: 139 m^{3}/s (4,900 cu ft/s)

Basin features
- Progression: Chusovaya→ Kama→ Volga→ Caspian Sea

The Sylva (Russian: Сылва) is a river in Sverdlovsk Oblast and Perm Krai in Russia. It is 493 kilometres (306 mi) in length. The area of the basin is 19,700 square kilometres (7,600 sq mi). The Sylva flows into the Chusovoy Cove of the Kama Reservoir. It freezes up in November and stays under the ice until April. Principal tributaries: Iren, Babka, Irgina, Vogulka (left); Barda, Shakva (right). Main port: Kungur.

Every year hundreds of tourists come to Kungur, through routes down the Sylva, Iren and Shakva rivers. The Sylva River flows leisurely over a flat plateau, across Preduraliye Nature Preserve, and past abrupt cliffs, fossilized remnants of coral reefs left by the long-disappeared Great Permian Sea, which at some places rise up to 100 metres (330 ft) above the level of the river, covered with pine and fir groves.

== Inhabited localities ==
- The town of Kungur
- The urban-type settlement of Suksun
- The village of Molyobka
