= Chusovaya =

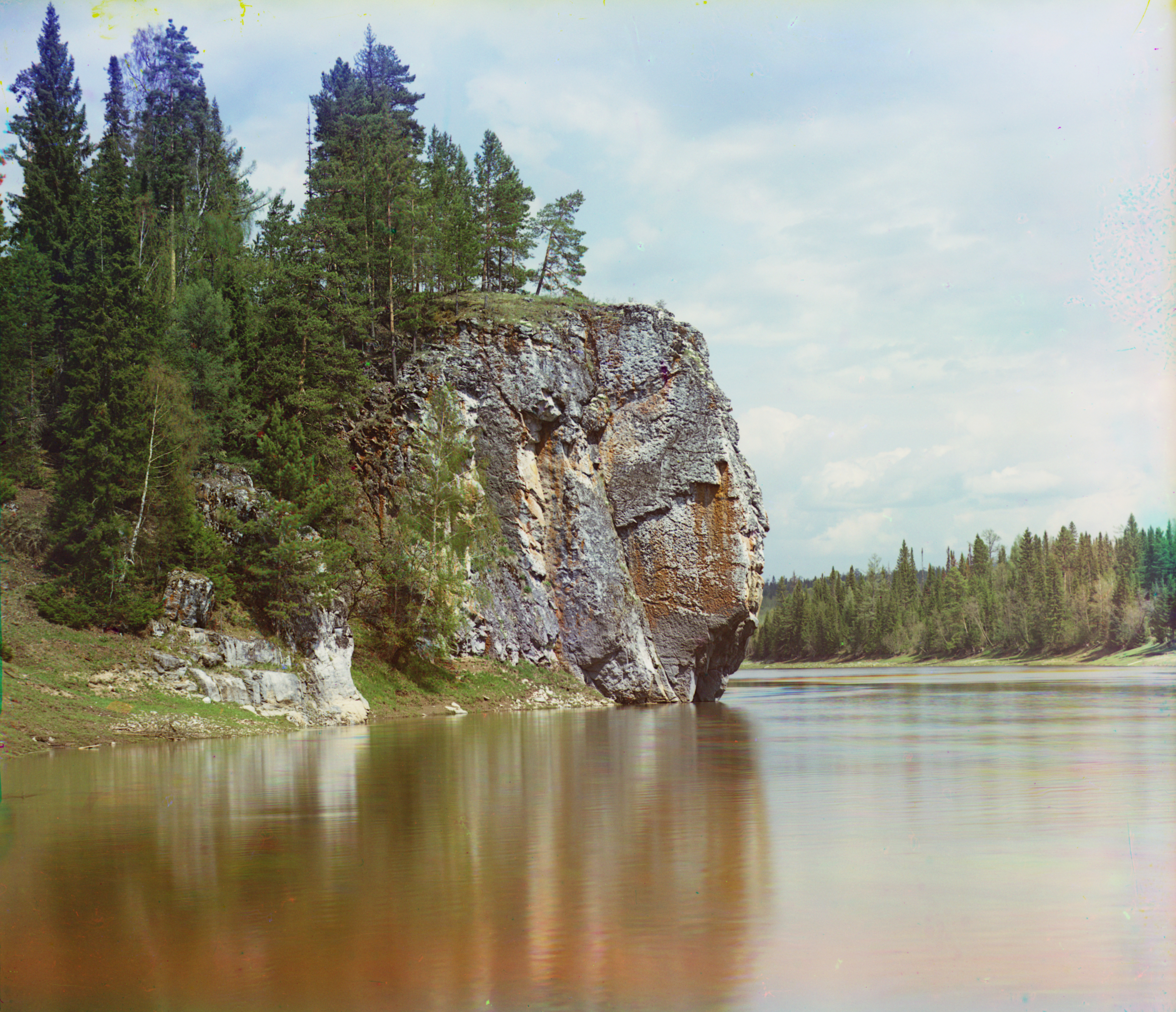
- View of the river in the 1910s. Maksimovsky rock.

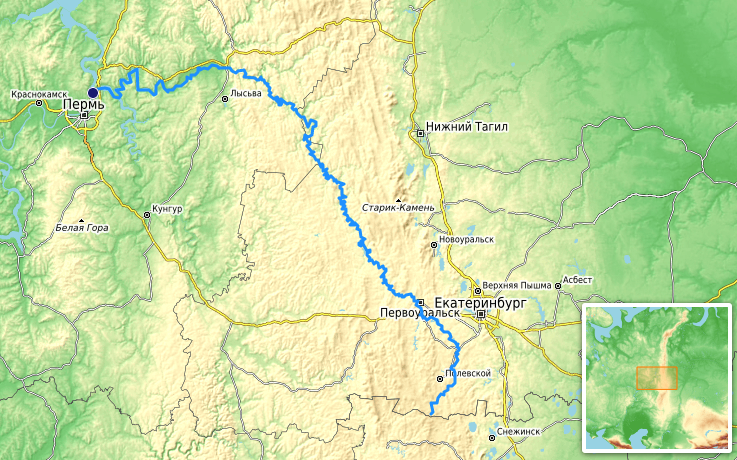

Location
- Country: Russia

Physical characteristics
- Source
  - location: Central Ural
  - coordinates: 56.157°N 60.346°E
  - elevation: 356 m (1,168 ft)
- Mouth: Kama Reservoir
  - coordinates: 58.1575°N 56.3874°E
  - elevation: 108.5 m (356 ft)
- Length: 592 km (368 mi)
- Basin size: 23,000 km^{2} (8,900 sq mi)
- Discharge
  - average: 222 m^{3}/s (7,800 cu ft/s)

Basin features
- Progression: Kama Reservoir→ Kama→ Volga→ Caspian Sea

The Chusovaya (Russian: Чусова́я) is a river flowing in Perm Krai, Sverdlovsk Oblast and Chelyabinsk Oblast of Russia. A tributary of the Kama, which in turn is a tributary of the Volga, discharges into the Chusovskoy Cove of the Kamsky Reservoir. The river is remarkable in that it originates on the eastern slopes of the Ural Mountains in Asia, crosses the mountains, and mostly runs on their western slopes in Europe. The Chusovaya River is widely used as a source of water. In particular, its water is taken from the Volchikhinsky Reservoir, 37 square kilometres (14 mi^{2}), to the Verkhneisetsky Reservoir to supply the major city of Yekaterinburg. Fifteen smaller reservoirs are spread over about 150 tributaries of the river.

There are numerous metal and coal mines along the Chusovaya, and the river was intensively used to deliver their production to the western Russia. However, industrial navigation nearly halted with the development of railways in the early 20th century. Chusovoy is the major remaining port on the river.

The Chusovaya River is famous for its hundreds of large rocks located along the shoreline which are the major tourist attraction of the area. Some rocks posed much danger to boats, especially during the spring thaw. They are generally called boitsy (бойцы, lit. fighters). Many of them have individual names and are protected by the state as natural monuments.

== Hydrography ==
The basin of the Chusovaya River has an area of 23,000 square kilometres (8,900 mi^{2}) and an average elevation of 356 metres (1,168 ft). The river is 592 kilometres (368 mi) (777 kilometres according to other sources) and has an average height gradient of 0.4 m/km. It has two sources: Poludennaya Chusovaya and Western (Zapadanaya) Chusovaya. The former originates in a swampy area in the north of Chelyabinsk Oblast and flows to the north. After 45 kilometres (28 mi), it merges with the Western Chusovaya, which starts at the Ufaley ridge. Then the river flows for about 150 kilometres (93 mi) on the eastern slope of the Ural Mountains; here its width is 10 to 13 metres (33 to 43 ft). In the upper stream Chusovaya takes many tributaries and shows on its shores outcrops of crystalline shale, which were formed through the interaction of magmatic and sedimentary rocks.

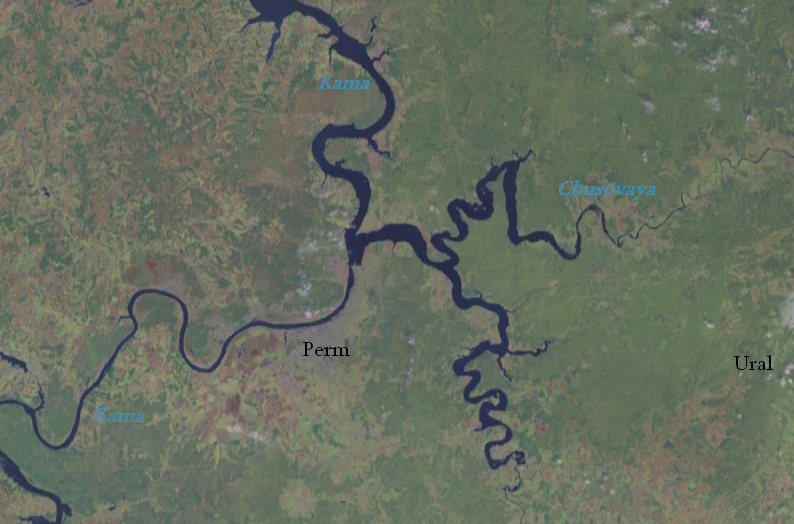
Satellite image of the confluence of the Kama and Chusovaya rivers.

In the middle reaches, the river slopes have canyon-like character. Here the river cuts through several low mountain ranges, which tower above the riverbed as cliffs called boitsy. There are about 200 of them in the middle reaches and about 50 are protected by the state as natural monuments. Boitsyare of sedimentary origin and are made from limestone and rarely dolomite, anhydrite and shale; they rise 10 to 115 metres (33 to 377 ft) above the water and extend for 30 to 1,500 metres (100 to 4,920 ft). Limestone is prone to weathering which often creates peculiar shapes. Karst processes created numerous caves and grottoes in this area. The river here has a mountainous character with about 70 rapids, and its elevation here decreases by 120 metres (390 ft) over a length of 280 kilometres (170 mi). Large boulders sometimes protrude above the water surface. Here the river is 120 to 140 metres (390 to 460 ft) wide and is rather winding, skirting mountain ranges and making numerous loops. One loop near Utkinskoy settlement is 5 kilometres (3 mi) in diameter and is almost a closed loop.

In the lower reaches, after exiting from the Ural Mountains, the river has a plain character. Here it flows through meadows, marshes, deciduous and mixed forests; it slows down and widens in some places up to 300 metres (980 ft), making occasional broad bends. The river discharges into the Chusovskoy Cove of Kama Reservoir, which is associated with the Kama hydroelectric power station located 693 kilometres (431 mi) from the mouth of the Kama River. Construction of the dam resulted in flooding of the lower reaches of the Chusovaya up to 125 kilometres (78 mi) from the mouth. The bottom of the river throughout its length is mainly covered in pebbles.

The water discharge varies between 8.4 and 4,570 cubic metres per second (300 and 161,390 cu ft/s) with the average of 222 cubic metres per second (7,800 cu ft/s). The flow is relatively strong – about 10 times that of such rivers as Volga and Kama; it is about 8 kilometres per hour (5 mph) on average and may reach 25 kilometres per hour (16 mph) in some places. Chusovaya usually freezes in late October through early December and thaws in April. Ice jams are common for the lower reaches with the increase in the water level of up to 2.8 metres (9.2 ft). The river is fed by snow (55%). precipitation (29%) and underground waters (18%). The floods typically occur between mid-April and mid-June. During the early summer, there are 6–7 rain floods with water levels rising up to 4 to 5 metres (13 to 16 ft). In July through August, the river depth decreases to 7 to 15 centimetres (2.8 to 5.9 in) in some places.

=== Tributaries ===
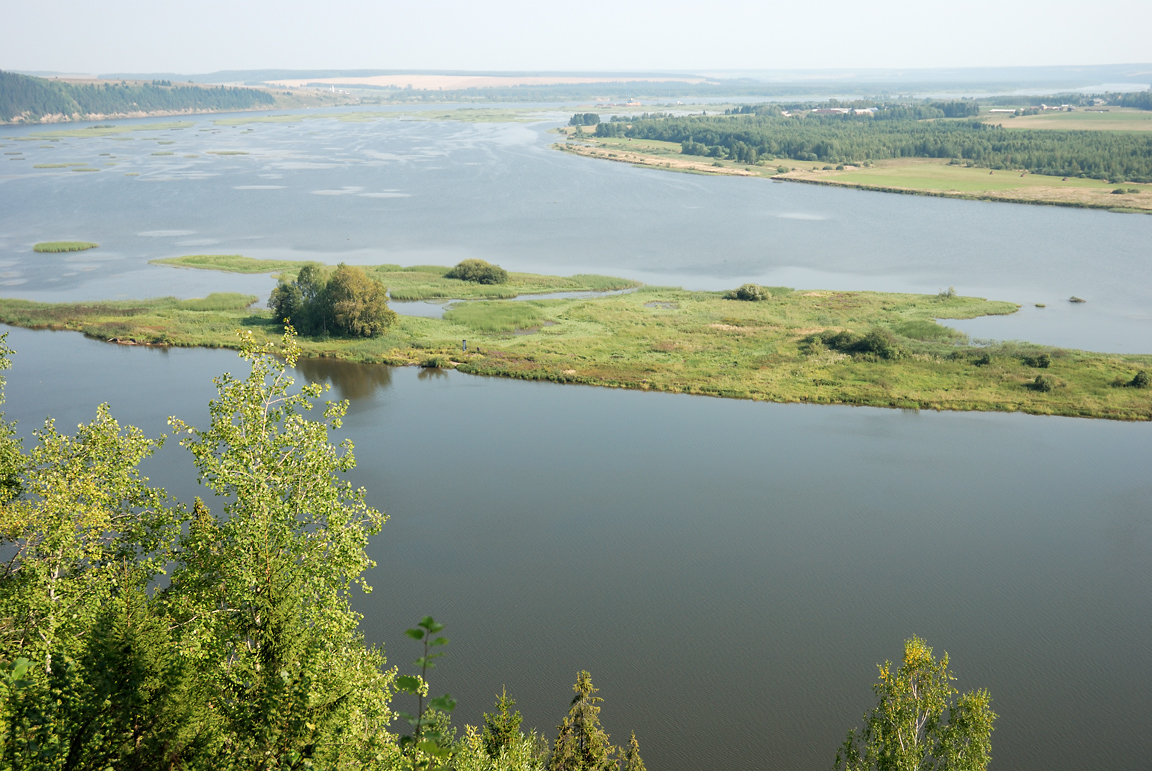
Lower reaches of Chusovaya

Chusovaya takes more than 150 tributaries with the largest being the river Sylva. The Kumysh tributary dives underground for about 6 km; the place where it disappears is called нырок in Russian ("dive" in English) by the local people, and the place where it resurfaces is named вынырок ("coming to the surface"). Such behavior is unusual but not unique to Kumysh and is observed for about 15 other rivers of the Urals. The main tributaries of the Chusovaya are from source to mouth:

- Revda (left)
- Bolshoy Shishim (right)
- Utka (left)
- Sulyom (right)
- Mezhevaya Utka (right)
- Serebryanka (right)
- Sylvitsa (right)
- Kumysh (left)
- Koyva (right)
- Usva (right)
- Lysva (left)
- Sylva (left)

== Flora and fauna ==
The upper reaches of the Chusovaya have abundant marshes and meadows. Forests are rare and are mostly pine forests. The middle reaches are covered by boreal coniferous forests, which are dominated by pine, Siberian Pine, larch and fir. Forests are scarce also in the lower reaches and mostly contain aspen, birch, mountain ash and willow. Fishes include minnow, bass, ruffe, roach, pike, ide (Leuciscus idus), chub (Squalius cephalus) and bream. There are colonies of crayfish. The tributaries show traces of beavers and the main river hosts muskrats. In the autumn, the river is visited by ducks, geese and other waterfowl. The surrounding forests are inhabited by usual taiga animals such as moose, brown bear, wolf, lynx, fox, hare, squirrel, hazel grouse and black grouse.

== History ==
The river had long been inhabited by people, as evident from numerous Neolithic and Bronze Age settlements found on the river banks. The 15th Century chronicler Giacomo Filippo Foresti (a.k.a. Jacobus Philippus Foresti da Bergamo) mentioned a river in the area named the Thisageta, and the 19th Century archaeologist Sir Ellis Minns proposed that the Chusovaya may originally have been named after the Thyssagetae, a little-known steppe tribe who apparently lived in the area.

In the Middle Ages, the river basin was mostly populated by Bashkirs, Mansi and Komi-Permyaks. It is assumed that the Battle of Chulmandore, in which Komi-Permyaks defeated Mongols, occurred near the river mouth. The Chusovaya River was first mentioned in 1396 in the Novgorod chronicles. Russians started active explorations of the Urals in the early 16th century, and the first Russian settlement Nizhnechusovskie Gorodki appeared on Chusovaya in 1568. From 1579, the garrison of this settlement was headed by the Russian explorer Ermak. The entire river basin was then owned by merchants Stroganov. Stroganovs in particular supplied the expedition of Ermak in the autumn of 1581 up the Chusovaya and beyond the Urals.

Subsequently, the vast lands beyond the Urals, including the upper Chusovaya, were given to Demidov, and the border between the possessions of Stroganov and Demidov was at the river Mezhevaya Utka. Demidov was actively exploring the rich local deposits in his lands and built several iron works, including Polevskoy (1722), Vasilyevo-Shaitansky (1732), Sredneuralskiy (1734) and Seversky (1735).

Before construction of the railway across the Urals, the river served as an important route for transporting metals and fur from the Urals to the western Russia. The first port for this purpose was built in the mouth of the Utka tributary in 1703 by the orders of Peter the Great. Every spring, with the start of the flood, heavily loaded barges were sent from the wharf in the upper Chusovaya to Perm. It was rather difficult to navigate heavy wooden ships through the fast and winding river and many were crashing to the coastal cliffs. About 50 barges had major accidents between 1857 and 1861 on the Chusovaya. In the spring of 1877 alone, 47 barges sank drowning more than 100 men, 23 of those barges crashed at one and the same cliff Brigand (Russian: Разбойник). Massive efforts were spent from the 17th through 19th centuries to improve the navigation conditions on Chusovaya. The most dangerous shore cliffs were blown up with dynamite, including the Brigand (this was one of the world's first controlled underwater explosions.) Smaller boulders protruding at the river center were removed, and hundreds mooring poles had been installed. Logs were set up in the places where the currents tended to wash up boats on the rocks in order to soften the impact. These measures drastically reduced the number of accidents (from 10% to 4% of the total number of shipments in 1890) and the traffic on the river grew from 49,500 tonnes in 1862 to 128,800 tonnes in 1873. It then dropped to 107,200 tonnes and remained at this level through the 1890s.

The barges used on Chusovaya were sturdy wooden boats 35 to 40 metres (115 to 131 ft) long and 6 to 8 metres (20 to 26 ft) wide that could carry up to 200 tonnes. Some barges were reinforced inside with metal stripes and could sustain up to 10 navigation seasons. Barges were equipped with roped weights, which were thrown overboard to increase the drag thereby reducing the barge speed when needed. The first steamship appeared on Chusovaya in 1841, it was a metal vessel named Nikita Demidov. For the first three years, the ship was bringing barges loaded with the production of the Staroutkinsky plant between Suksun and Levshino. In 1844, there was an attempt to run the ship in the middle reaches. After a 24-day trip, she managed to pass only 200 kilometres (120 mi) and then crashed, once again illustrating the difficulty of navigating the river.

River shipping declined after 1878 with the opening of the Gornozavodskaya railway. Since the early 20th century, shipment of metals was nearly halted and the barges were only occasionally transporting grain and supplies. The last barge trip occurred in 1920. As a result, many settlements along the river bank have been abandoned. However, the ironworks remained and provided the Soviet Army with metal during World War II.

== Commercial use ==
The Chusovaya is extensively used for water supply. In particular, water from Volchihinskoe reservoir is supplied to the Upper Iset Pond to serve the needs of Yekaterinburg and its suburbs. In order to improve the water supply, Nyazepetrovsk cascade was built in the mid-1970s. With this hydraulic system, Western Chusovaya was supplied with water from the Nyazepetrovsk reservoir on the Ufa. There are 15 small reservoirs at the plants on the tributaries of Chusovaya.

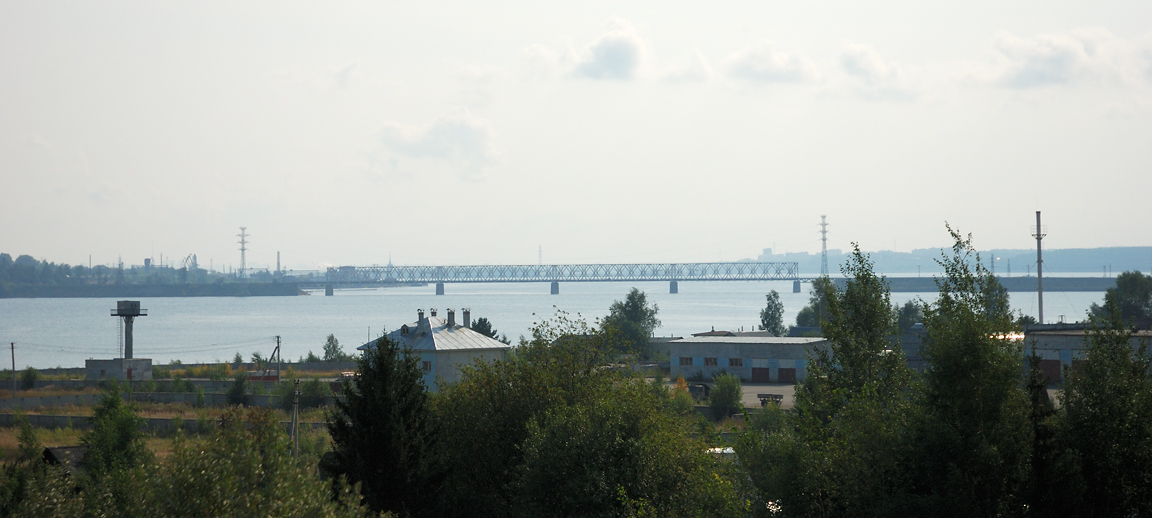
A railway bridge across Chusovaya near its confluence to the Kama Reservoir.

The river basin contains numerous deposits of iron, chromium, platinum, gold, diamond and coal. They were developed since the 17th century, some have been depleted and some are still being mined. Major settlements on the river (from source to the mouth) are Revda, Pervouralsk, Bilimbai, Staroutkinsk, Kyn, Ust-Koiva, Chusovoy and Verhnechusovskie Gorodki.

River is navigable from the city of Chusovoy, but the navigation sees very little commercial use nowadays. The railway bridge at the river mouth limits the height of passing ships to 9.5 metres (31 ft). Besides, between the 1930s and early 1980s, the river basin was intensively used for logging; logs were rafted loose, i.e. neither guided nor bundled, that cluttered the river. The last such rafting was carried out on Chusovaya in 1973, and since 1990 it is legally prohibited in Russia.

== Ecology ==
According to the Office for Environmental Protection of Perm Oblast, the water of the river near the town of Chusovoy is contaminated and does not meet the standards for the drinking and sanitary water. In 2006, the content of copper exceeded the maximum permissible concentration (MPC) twice, manganese 8 times, iron 5 times, petroleum 2 times (it was 21 times MPC in 2003) and hexavalent chromium 1.5 times (mostly due to the plant "Chrompic" in Pervouralsk). The biggest polluters of the river are Chusovskoy Steel Works and Chusovskoy Gorvodocanal.

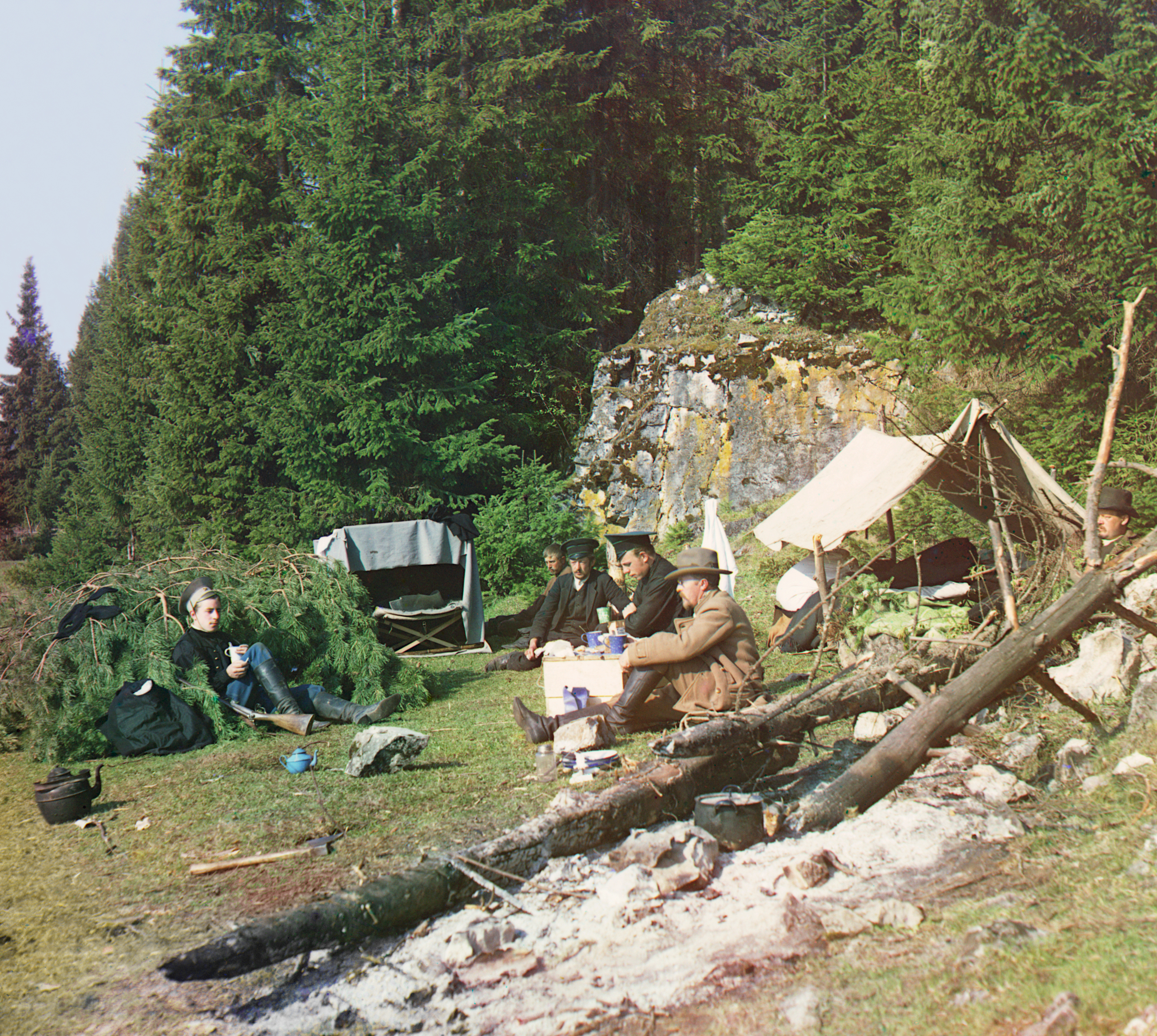
Overnight at a cliff on Chusovaya (1912).

== Tourism ==
Chusovaya has long been known for its rock formations, many of which have poetic names. They pose no dangers to light vessels and attract tourism. A tourist route was formed here in the 1960s and was visited by about 3,000 people per year. In one summer season of the 1980s, several tens of thousands tourists drafted along the river.

The major objects of attraction are the river banks, boitsy rocks and their caves and grottoes. Many of these rocks are under state protection as natural monuments. About 200,000 people annually visit the Kungur Cave near Chusovoy. This labyrinth of karst caves was formed as a result of dissolution of gypsum and anhydrites by water at a depth of 60 to 80 metres (200 to 260 ft) and is explored only up to about 6 kilometres (3.7 mi).
