= Ust-Kishert, Perm Krai =

Ust-Kishert Усть-Кишерть
- Selo
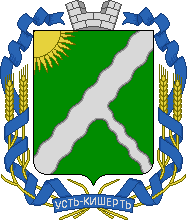
- Coat of arms
- Interactive map of Ust-Kishert
- Location of Ust-Kishert Ust-Kishert (Perm Krai)
- Coordinates: 57°21′38″N 57°14′33″E
- Country: Russia
- Federal subject: Perm Krai
- Administrative district: Kishertsky District
- Founded: 1648

Population (2010 Census)
  - Total: 4,202
  - Estimate (2021): 3,986 (−5.1%)

Administrative status
  - Capital of: Kishertsky District
- Time zone: UTC+5 (MSK+2)
- Postal code: 617600
- OKTMO ID: 57624428101

Ust-Kishert (Russian: Усть-Кишерть) is a rural locality (a selo) and the administrative center of Kishertsky District of Perm Krai, Russia. Population: 4,202 (2010 census); 4,525 (2002 census); 4,823 (1989 Soviet census).
