= Kishertsky District =

Kishertsky District Кишертский район (Russian)
- District
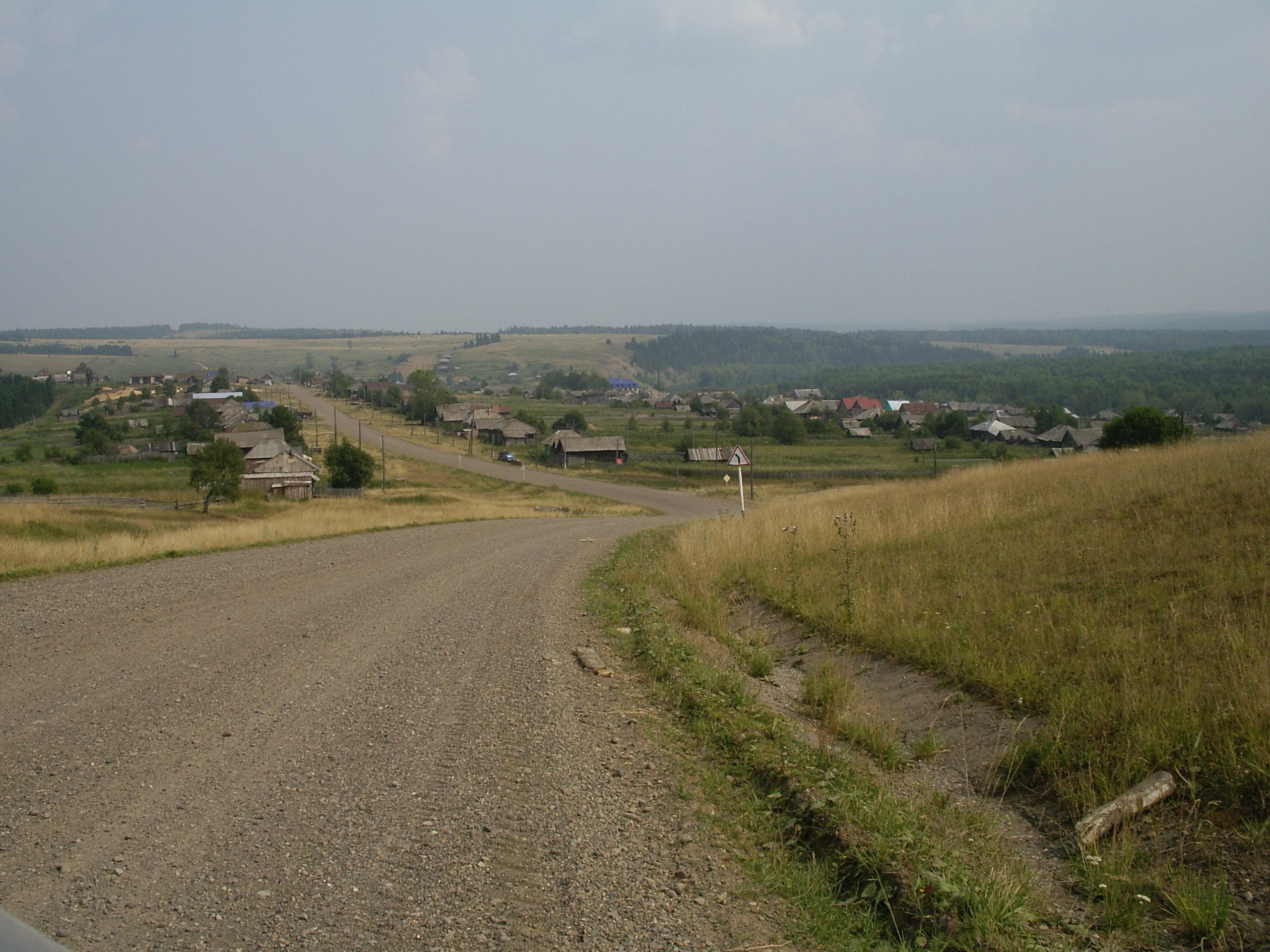
- KEntrance to Molyobka, Kishertsky District

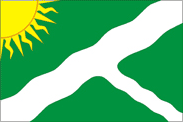
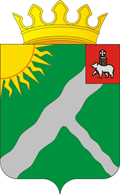
- Flag Coat of arms
- Location of Kishertsky District in Perm Krai
- Coordinates: 57.353°N 57.626°E
- Country: Russia
- Federal subject: Perm Krai
- Established: January 15, 1924
- Administrative center: Ust-Kishert

Area
  - Total: 1,400 km^{2} (540 sq mi)

Population (2010 Census)
  - Total: 12,777
  - Density: 9.1/km^{2} (24/sq mi)
  - Urban: 0%
  - Rural: 100%

Administrative structure
  - Inhabited localities: 86 rural localities

Municipal structure
  - Municipally incorporated as: Kishertsky Municipal District
  - Municipal divisions: 0 urban settlements, 5 rural settlements
- Time zone: UTC+5 (MSK+2)
- OKTMO ID: 57624000
- Website: http://kishert.permarea.ru/

Kishertsky District (Russian: Кише́ртский райо́н) is an administrative district (raion) of Perm Krai, Russia; one of the thirty-three in the krai. Municipally, it is incorporated as Kishertsky Municipal District. It is located in the southeast of the krai. The area of the district is 1,400 square kilometers (540 sq mi). Its administrative center is the rural locality (a selo) of Ust-Kishert. Population: 12,777 (2010 census); 15,093 (2002 census); 17,957 (1989 Soviet census). The population of Ust-Kishert accounts for 32.9% of the district's total population.

== Geography and climate ==
The district stretches for 30 kilometers (19 mi) from north to south and for 50 kilometers (31 mi) from east to west.

Annual precipitation is 500–600 millimeters (20–24 in).

== History ==
The district was created on January 15, 1924 as Ust-Kishertsky District (Усть-Кишертский район) of Kungur Okrug of Ural Oblast. It was renamed Kishertsky District on September 30, 1925.

== Demographics ==
The most numerous ethnic groups, according to the 2002 Census, include Russians at 94.7% and Tatars at 3%.

== Economy ==
The economy of the district is based on agriculture, mining, forestry, and food industries.

== Sources ==
- Законодательное собрание Пермской области. Закон №416-67 от 28 февраля 1996 г. «Об административно-территориальном устройстве Пермского края», в ред. Закона №504-ПК от 9 июля 2015 г. «О внесении изменений в Закон Пермской области "Об административно-территориальном устройстве Пермского края"». Вступил в силу с момента опубликования. Опубликован: "Звезда", №38, 12 марта 1996 г. (Legislative Assembly of Perm Oblast. Law #416-67 of February 28, 1996 On the Administrative-Territorial Structure of Perm Krai, as amended by the Law #504-PK of July 9, 2015 On Amending the Law of Perm Oblast "On the Administrative-Territorial Structure of Perm Krai". Effective as of the moment of publication.).
- Законодательное собрание Пермской области. Закон №1723-350 от 10 ноября 2004 г. «Об утверждении границ и о наделении статусом муниципальных образований Кишертского района Пермского края», в ред. Закона №273-ПК от 14 декабря 2013 г. «О внесении изменений в отдельные Законы Пермской области, Коми-Пермяцкого автономного округа, Пермского края». Вступил в силу через десять дней со дня официального опубликования. Опубликован: "Бюллетень Законодательного Собрания и администрации Пермской области", №12, I часть, 9 декабря 2004 г. (Legislative Assembly of Perm Oblast. Law #1723-350 of November 10, 2004 On Establishing the Borders and on Granting the Status to the Municipal Formations of Kishertsky District of Perm Krai, as amended by the Law #273-PK of December 14, 2013 On Amending Various Laws of Perm Oblast, Komi-Permyak Autonomous Okrug, Perm Krai. Effective as of the day which is ten days following the day of the official publication.).
