= Kumbakonam block =

Kumbakonam block is a community development block in the Kumbakonam taluk of Thanjavur District, Tamil Nadu, India. There are a total of 47 villages in this block. The block is surrounded by the Thirumanur and T.Palur blocks of Ariyalur District to the north, Thiruvidaimarudur and Thiruppanandal blocks of Thanjavur District to the east and Tiruvarur block of Tiruvarur District to the south and Papanasam block of Thanjavur district to the west. It is one of the six blocks of Thanjavur district watered by the Kaveri River.

== List of Panchayat Villages ==
SI.No	Panchayat Village
1	Agarathur
2	Ammachatram
3	Anaikkudi
4	Annalagraharam
5	Ariyapadaiveedu
6	Asoor
7	Athiyur
8	Baburajapuram
9	Cholanmaligai
10	Devanancheri
11	Eraharam
12	Innambur
13	Kadichambadi
14	Kallapuliyur
15	Kallur
16	Keelapalayar
17	Koranattu Karuppur
18	Korukkai
19	Kothankudi
20	Kovilacheri
21	Kumarankudi
22	Maharajapuram
23	Manambadi
24	Marudanallur
25	Nagagudi
26	Neerathanallur
27	Palavathankattalai
28	Pandaravadai Perumandi
29	Patteeswaram
30	Puthur
31	Sakkottai
32	Senganur
33	Seshambadi
34	Sundaraperumalkoil
35	Thenampadugai
36	Thillaiyambur
37	Thippirajapuram
38	Thirunallur
39	Thiruppurambiyam
40	Thiruvalanjuli
41	Udaiyalur
42	Ullur
43	Umamaheswarapuram
44	Uthamathani
45	Valapuram
46	Valaiyapettai
47	Vilandakandam
