= Thiruvidaimarudur block =

The Thiruvidaimarudur block is a revenue block in the Thiruvidaimarudur taluk of the Thanjavur district in Tamil Nadu, India. It has a total of 48 panchayat villages.

== List of panchayat villages ==
SI.No	Panchayat Village
1	Ammangudi
2	Andalampettai
3	Avaniyapuram
4	Elandurai
5	Enanallur
6	Govindapuram
7	Injikollai
8	Keeranur
9	Koohur
10	Kothankudi
11	Kovanur
12	Krishnapuram
13	Malayappanallur
14	Mallapuram
15	Mangudi
16	Manjamalli
17	Mathur
18	Melaiyur
19	Nachiarkoil
20	Nagarasampettai
21	Narasinganpettai
22	Paruthicheri
23	Paruthikudi
24	Perappadi
25	Poundarigapuram
26	Puthagaram
27	S.pudur
28	Sathanur
29	Sembiavarambal
30	Semmangudi
31	Sooriyanarkoil
32	Srinivasanallur
33	Thandalam
34	Thendanthottam
35	Thepperamanallur
36	Thirucherai
37	Thirumangalakudi
38	Thirunaraiyur
39	Thiruneelagudi
40	Thiruppandurai
41	Thiruvisanallur
42	Thukkatchi
43	Vanduvancheri
44	Vannakkudi
45	Vilankudi
46	Villiyavarambal
47	Visalur
48	Vittalur
