= Thiruvaiyaru block =

Thiruvaiyaru block is a revenue block in the Thiruvaiyaru taluk of Thanjavur district, Tamil Nadu, India. There are 40 villages in this block.

== List of Panchayat Villages ==
SI.No	Panchayat Village
1	Allur
2	Ambadumelagaram
3	Ammaiyagaram
4	Avikkarai
5	Budarayanallur
6	Kadamangudi
7	Kaduveli
8	Kalumangalam
9	Kalyanapuram I
10	Kalyanapuram II
11	Kandiyur
12	Karugudi
13	Karuppur
14	Keelathirupanthuruthi
15	Konerirajapuram
16	Kulimathur
17	Maharajapuram
18	Mannarsamudram
19	Marur
20	Muhasakalyanapuram
21	Naducauvery
22	Peramur
23	Ponavasal
24	Royampettai
25	Sathanur
26	Semmangudi
27	Thillaisthanam
28	Thiruchotruthurai
29	Thirupalanam
30	Thiruvalampozhil
31	Uppukatchipettai
32	Vadugakudi
33	Vaithianathanpettai
34	Valappakudi
35	Vanarangudi
36	Varagur
37	Vellamperambur
38	Venkatasamudram
39	Vilangudi
40	Vinnamangalam
