= Mangudi =

Mangudi may refer to:

== Places in India ==
- Mangudi, Lalgudi (Trichy district)
- Mangudi (Thanjavur district)
- Mangudi (Tirunelveli District)
- Mangudi, Annavasal, Pudukkottai
- Mangudi, Aranthangi, Pudukkottai
- Mangudi-pudukottai

== Other ==
- Mangudi Minor, a 1978 Tamil film
