= Thandalam =

Thandalam may refer to several places in India:

- Thandalam, Chennai, Tamil Nadu (perhaps the most common meaning)
- Thandalam, Thiruvananthapuram, Kerala
- Thandalam, Thanjavur, Tamil Nadu
