= Thirucherai =

- village
- Location in Tamil Nadu, India
- Coordinates: 10°55′56″N 79°31′58″E
- Country: India
- State: Tamil Nadu
- District: Thanjavur
- Taluk: Kumbakonam taluk

Population (2001)
  - Total: 3,389

Languages
  - Official: Tamil
- Time zone: UTC+5:30 (IST)
- Postal code: 612605

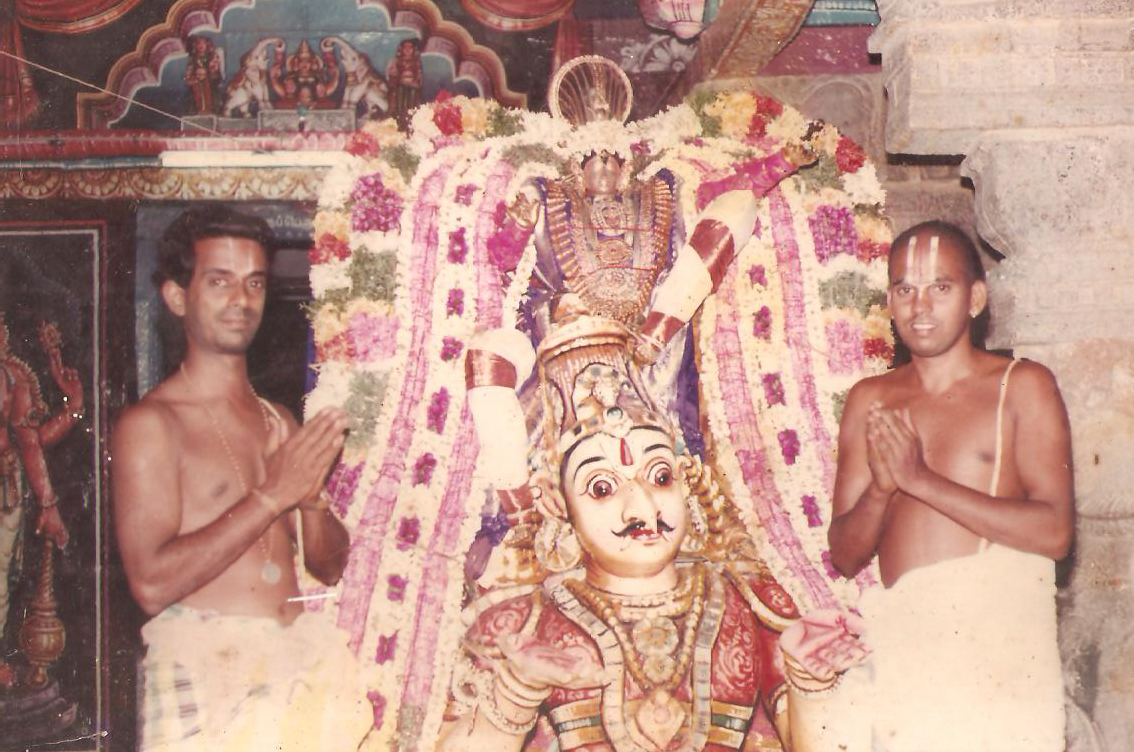
Saranathan

Thirucherai is a village in the Kumbakonam taluk of Thanjavur district, Tamil Nadu, India. It is bordered by Aandiruppu to the east. The Tirucherai Saranathan Temple is located in the village.

== Location ==
Thirucherai is located 4 km from Kudavasal and around 14 km from Kumbakonam on the Kumbakonam-Tiruvarur State Highway 64.

== Demographics ==
As per the 2001 census, Thirucherai had a total population of 3389, with 1673 males and 1716 females. The sex ratio was 1.026. The literacy rate was 79.35%

Notable people from Thirucherai include film director N. Lingusamy.
