= Innambur Ezhutharinathar Temple =

Hindu temple of Shiva in Innambur, India

Ezhutharinathar Temple
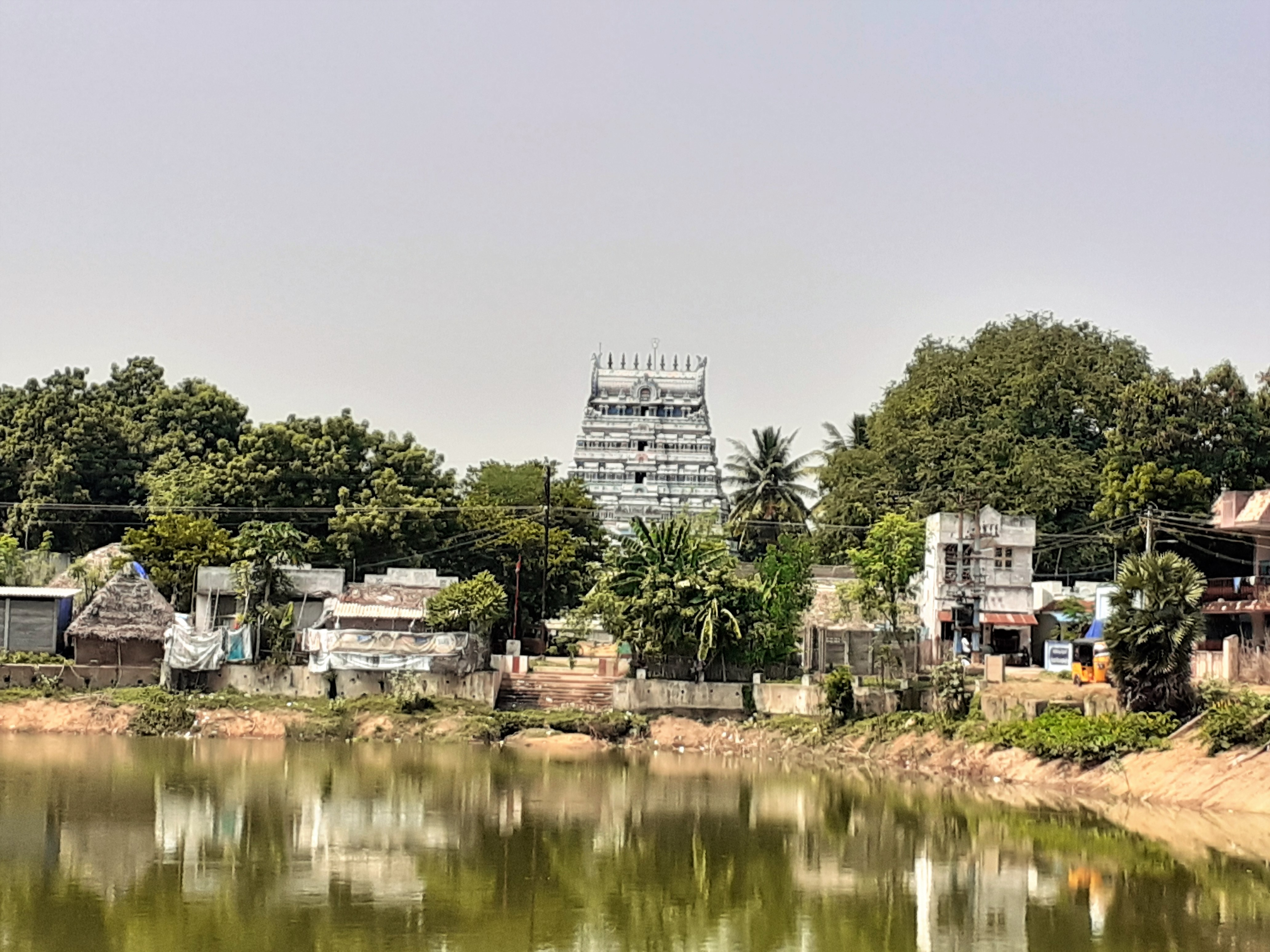
- The temple gopuram (tower)

- Location in Tamil Nadu

Religion
- Affiliation: Hinduism
- District: Thanjavur
- Deity: Ezhutharinathar (Shiva), Nithya Kalyani (Parvati)

Location
- Location: Innambur
- State: Tamil Nadu
- Country: India
- Coordinates: 10°58′54″N 79°20′20″E

Architecture
- Type: Dravidian architecture

Innambur Ezhutharinathar Temple is a Hindu temple to Shiva in Innambur, a village in the outskirts of Kumbakonam, in Thanjavur district in Tamil Nadu, India. Shiva is worshipped as Ezhutharinathar and his consort Parvati as Nithya Kalyani. Ona Kantheeswarar is mentioned in the 7th century Tamil Saiva canonical work, the Tevaram, written by Tamil saint poets known as the Nayanars and classified as Paadal Petra Sthalam, the 275 temples in the canon.

The temple has a five-tiered rajagopuram, the entrance tower and all the shrines are enclosed in rectangular walls. The temple is maintained and administered by the Hindu Religious and Endowment Board of the Government of Tamil Nadu.

== Legend ==
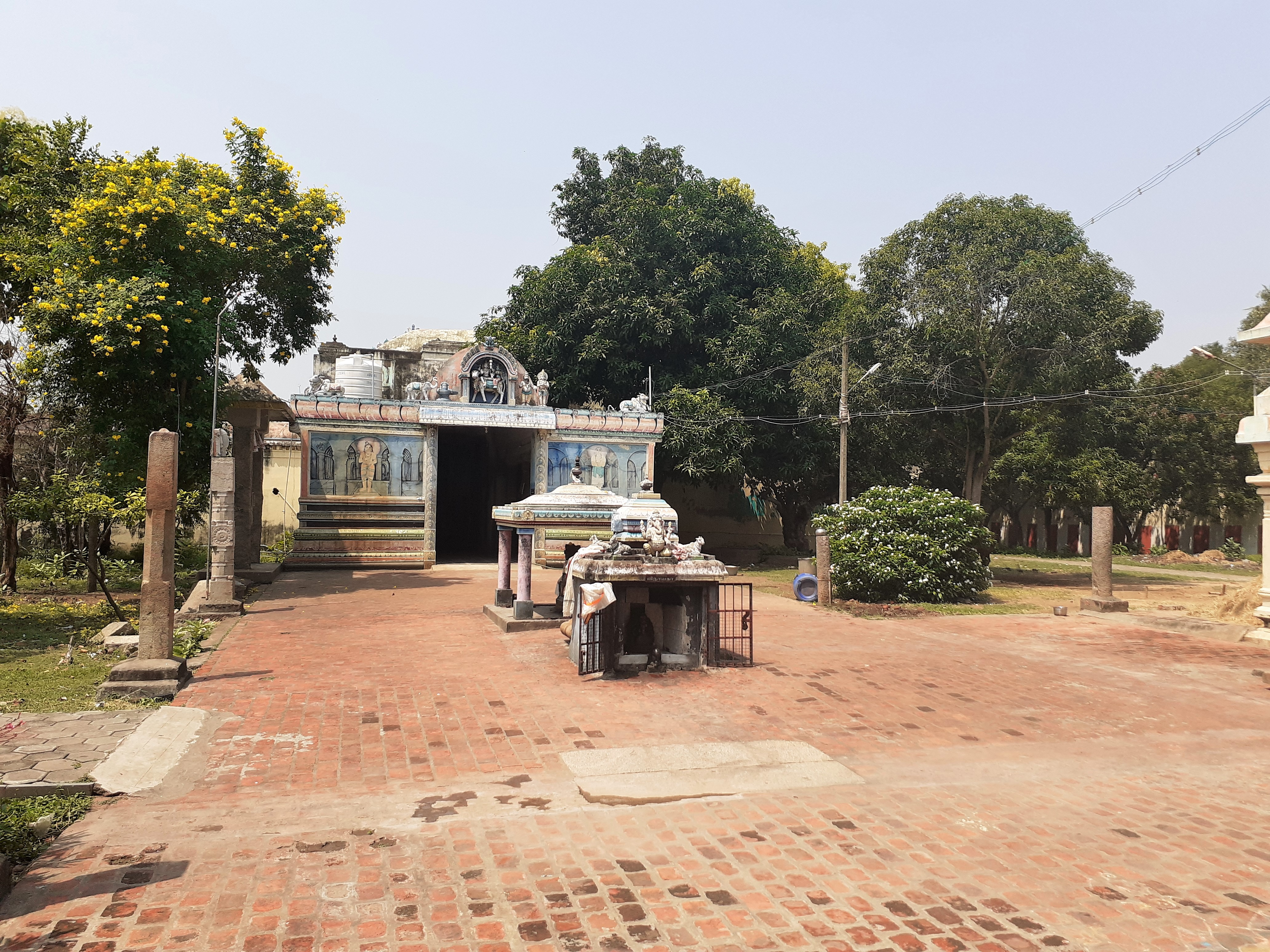
Entrance of the Shiva shrine

As per Hindu legend, once the accountant Of the temple was asked to submit the accounts to the king. The accountant did not have the correct accounts during the time and feared punishment from the king. An ardent devotee of Shiva, the accountant prayed to the god to rescue him. Shiva, in the form of the accountant, submitted the accounts. The king was pleased and praised the accountant, who was amused at the events. He later realised that it was divine grace. Since Shiva came down and submitted the accounts, he came to be known as Ezhutharinathar. As per another legend, the presiding deity was worshipped by an elephant. There is also a belief that sage Agastya attained knowledge about grammar after worshipping Ezhutharinathar. The temple is counted as one of the temples built on the northern banks of River Kaveri.

== Architecture ==
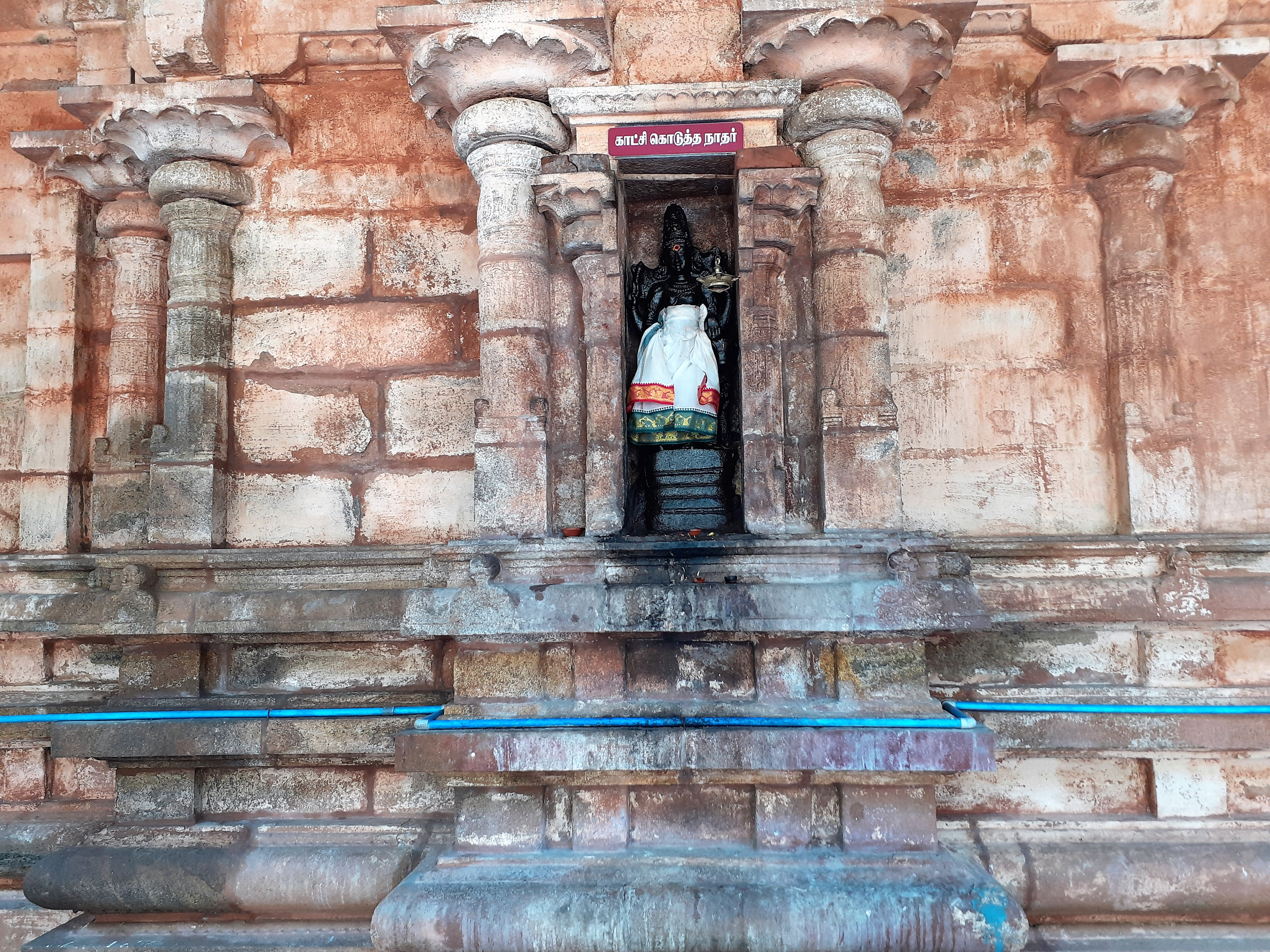
Image of Brahma

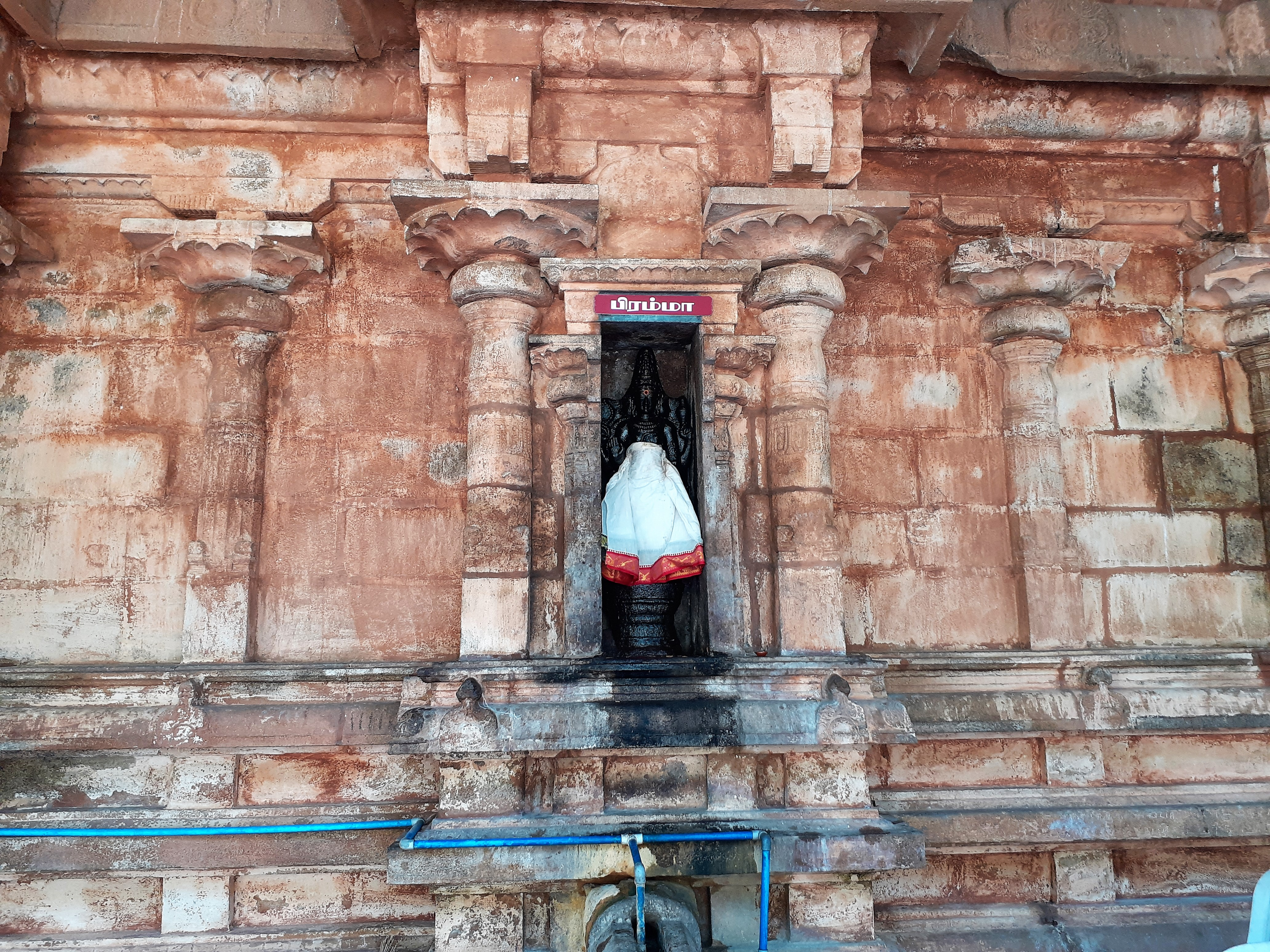
Image of Katchikodutha Nathar

The temple is located 10 km (6.2 mi) north-west of Kumbakonam on the Kumbakonam - Thirupurambiyam road. Ezhutharinathar temple has a rectangular plan with two prakarams (outer courtyard) covering an area of 1 acre (0.40 ha) and a five-tiered rajagopuram (gateway tower) facing East. The central shrine faces east and houses the image of Ezhutharinathar (Shiva) in the form of the lingam made of granite and is believed to be a swayambhu (self manifested). There are shrines for Shiva's sons Ganesha (Vinayagar) and Kartikeya (Murugan), on either side of the sanctum entrance. The granite images of Nandi (the bull and vehicle of Shiva), a tall flag staff and a Balipeeta, the place of offering, axial to the sanctum. As in other Shiva temples of Tamil Nadu, the first precinct or the walls around the sanctum of Ona Kantheeswarar has images of Dakshinamurthy (Shiva as the Teacher), Durga (warrior-goddess) and Chandikeswarar (a saint and devotee of Shiva). The temple precinct is surrounded by granite walls. Following the legend of the elephant, the roof over the sanctum is in the form of an elephant, called Gajaprashta Vimana.
