= Karuvalarcheri Agastheeswarar Temple =

Hindu temple in India

Coordinates: 10.9245°N 79.4161°E

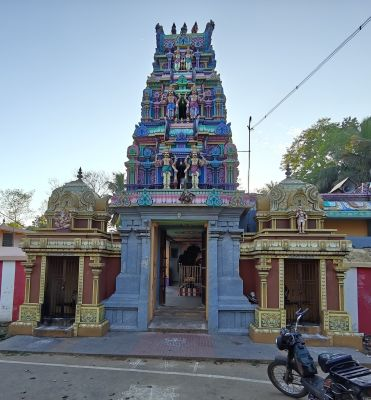
Karuvalarcheri Agastheeswarar Temple

Karuvalarcheri Agastheeswarar Temple is a Hindu temple located at Karuvalarcheri in Thanjavur district of Tamil Nadu, India.

== Location ==
This temple is located at Kumbakonam-Valangaiman-Mannargudi road, at a distance of 2 k.m. from Marudanallur in Karuvalarcheri.

== Presiding deity ==
The presiding deity, in the form of Lingam, is Shiva. He is called as Agastheeswarar. His consort is known as Akilandesvari. The consort is self made. So, there is no Abhisheka to this deity. It is rare to see such a deity anywhere. One can see the full form of the deity only during Maha Shivaratri and the nine days of Navaratri. On other days half form of the deity could be seen while the other half is closed with screen. On routine days only the face of the deity can be seen and worshipped.

== Speciality ==
Akilandeswari, is called as Karu Valarkkum Nayaki. Those who are without children came to worship this temple in order to beget children. There is a faith that if married women who are not having children come and worship here, will be bestowed with children.
