= Vilangudi =

Vilangudi may refer to:

- Vilangudi, Madurai, Tamil Nadu
- Vilangudi, Thanjavur, Tamil Nadu
