= Mathur, Kumbakonam =

Coordinates: 10.9065°N 79.4482°E

Mathur
- village
- Interactive map of Mathur
- Country: India
- State: Tamil Nadu
- District: Thanjavur
- Taluk: Kumbakonam

Population (2001)
  - Total: 2,376

Languages
  - Official: Tamil
- Time zone: UTC+5:30 (IST)

Mathur is a village in the Kumbakonam taluk, Thiruvidaimarudur block of Thanjavur district, Tamil Nadu, India.

== Demographics ==
As per the 2001 census, Mathur had a total population of 2376 with 1191 males and 1185 females. The sex ratio was 995. The literacy rate was 75.84
