= Mallapuram (disambiguation) =

Mallapuram and similar can mean these places in India:

- Mallapuram, a village in Tamil Nadu
- Malappuram, a city in Kerala
- Malappuram district in Kerala
- Mallapur, a suburb of Hyderabad, Andhra Pradesh
- B. Mallapuram, another name for Bommidi, a town in Dharmapuri district in Tamil Nadu
- Gudur, Kurnool, a village in Andhra Pradesh
