= Sarguna Lingeswarar Temple =

Shiva temple in Tamil Nadu, India

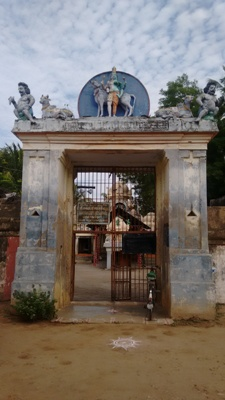
The entrance of the temple

Sarguna Lingeswarar Temple(சற்குணலிங்கேஸ்வரர் கோயில்), also known as the Karukudi Nathar Temple, is a Hindu temple located at Marudhanallur in the Thanjavur district of Tamil Nadu, India. The temple is dedicated to Shiva.

== Location ==
Marudhanallur is located at a distance of 5 kilometres from Kumbakonam on the Mannargudi road.

== Architecture ==
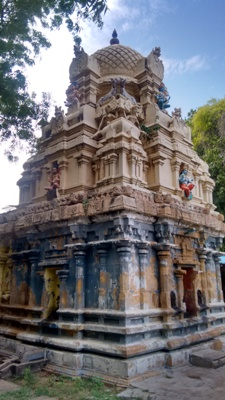
Vimana of the presiding deity

The main idol is a shivalinga called Prithvi Linga made of sand. There is also another linga called Hanumantha Linga. There are shrines to Ganesha, Murugan, Dakshinamurti and the Navagrahas.

== Significance ==
The Saivite saint Sambandar had sung praises of the temple in the Thevaram. The neighbouring village of Enanallur is the birthplace of Enadi Nayanar, one of the 63 Nayanmars.

A trader named Dhananjayan had been cured of leprosy at this place and is frequented by people afflicted with the disease.
