= Kothangudi =

Kothangudi may refer to:

- Kothangudi, Kumbakonam taluk, a village in the Kumbakonam taluk of Thanjavur district, Tamil Nadu, India
- Kothangudi, Papanasam taluk, a village in the Papanasam taluk of Thanjavur district, Tamil Nadu, India
