= Paruthicheri =

Village in Tamil Nadu, India

- village
- Country: India
- State: Tamil Nadu
- District: Thanjavur
- Taluk: Kumbakonam

Population (2001)
  - Total: 1,021

Languages
  - Official: Tamil, English
- Time zone: UTC+5:30 (IST)

Paruthicheri is a village in the Kumbakonam taluk of Thanjavur district, Tamil Nadu, India.

== Demographics ==
As per the 2001 census, Paruthicheri had a total population of 1021 with 503 males and 513 females. The sex ratio was 1030. The literacy rate was 75.5.
