= Kumarankudi =

- village
- Country: India
- State: Tamil Nadu
- District: Thanjavur
- Taluk: Kumbakonam

Population (2001)
  - Total: 2,091

Languages
  - Official: Tamil
- Time zone: UTC+5:30 (IST)

Kumarankudi is a village in the Kumbakonam taluk of Thanjavur district, Tamil Nadu, India.

== Demographics ==
As per the 2001 census, Kumarankudi had a total population of 2091 with 1044 males and 1047 females. The sex ratio was 1003. The literacy rate was 54.43
