= Kumaramangalam, Thanjavur =

Kumaramangalam
- village
- Country: India
- State: Tamil Nadu
- District: Thanjavur
- Taluk: Kumbakonam

Population (2001)
  - Total: 1,315

Languages
  - Official: Tamil
- Time zone: UTC+5:30 (IST)

Kumaramangalam is a village in the Kumbakonam taluk of Thanjavur district, Tamil Nadu, India.

== Demographics ==
As per the 2001 census, Kumaramangalam had a total population of 1315 with 676 males and 639 females. The sex ratio was 945. The literacy rate was 72.69%.
