= Soundararajan Temple, Kadichambadi =

Temple in Tamil Nadu, India

Soundararajan Temple is an old Hindu temple located in Kadichambadi village near Kumbakonam in Tamil Nadu, India. It is dedicated to the Hindu god Vishnu. According to Hindu mythology, the site was the place from where Vishnu gave glorious appearance to Brahma.

== Temple complex ==
The Rajagopuram of Soundararajan Temple comprises three phrases. The main entrance of the temple faces eastwards (there was formerly a separate complex for garudhan which is now shifted to the temple entrance). The centre of the temple consists of a separate complex for Shri Saundararajan Perumal which is east facing. There is also a separate complex for Sri Saundaravalli and Andal.

== Temple Deities ==
- Sri Soundararajan Perumal, Bhoomidevi, Sridevi
- Sri Soundaravalli
- Andal
- Anjaneyar
- Nammalvar
- Thirumangai Alvar
- Ramanujar

== Temple Tank ==
The temple tank or pushkarani is located to the north of the temple. Biruku Munivar did thavas near this tank to get rid of his sin. Hence it is also called “Birukuthirtham” and “Brahmathirtham”.

== Stone inscriptions ==
There are incomplete stone inscriptions in the walls of the Sri Soundaravalli complex and near to Alvar.

The sense of the Sri Soundaravalli complex inscription is that the garden which situated to the south of the temple was used to decorate Sarangapani temple, Kumbakonam. It also specifies that 28,800 sq ft of land were given to "Ara alagar" (Sri Soundrarajan Perumal).

The Alvar complex stone inscription tells of a Diya donation for the temple.
