= Thirumaignanam =

- village
- Country: India
- State: Tamil Nadu
- District: Thanjavur
- Taluk: Kumbakonam

Population (2001)
  - Total: 895

Languages
  - Official: Tamil
- Time zone: UTC+5:30 (IST)

Thirumaignanam is a village in the Kumbakonam taluk of Thanjavur district, Tamil Nadu, India.

== Demographics ==
As per the 2001 census, Thirumaignanam had a population of 895 with 451 males and 444 females. The sex ratio was 984. The literacy rate was 89.57%.
