= Palaiyanallur =

- village
- Country: India
- State: Tamil Nadu
- District: Thanjavur
- Taluk: Kumbakonam

Population (2001)
  - Total: 200

Languages
  - Official: Tamil
- Time zone: UTC+5:30 (IST)

Palaiyanallur is a village in the Kumbakonam taluk of Thanjavur district, Tamil Nadu, India.

== Demographics ==
As per the 2001 census, Palaiyanallur had a total population of 200 with 102 males and 98 females. The sex ratio was 961. The literacy rate was 76.84
