= Valaiyapettai =

Coordinates: 10°58′N 79°21′E

- Village
- Interactive map of Valaiyapettai
- Country: India
- State: Tamil Nadu
- District: Thanjavur
- Taluk: Kumbakonam

Population (2001)
  - Total: 4,810

Languages
  - Official: Tamil
- Time zone: UTC+5:30 (IST)
- Postal code: 612702

Valaiyapettai is a village in the Kumbakonam taluk of Thanjavur district, Tamil Nadu, India.

== Demographics ==
As per the 2001 census, Valaiyapettai had a total population of 4810 with 2390 males and 2420 females. The sex ratio was 1013. The literacy rate was 69.37%.
