= Perumandi =

- Village
- Location in Tamil Nadu, India Perumandi (India)
- Coordinates: 10°58′51″N 79°23′02″E
- Country: India
- State: Tamil Nadu
- District: Thanjavur
- Taluk: Kumbakonam

Population (2001)
  - Total: 7,000

Languages
  - Official: Tamil
- Time zone: UTC+5:30 (IST)
- PIN: 612***
- Telephone code: 0435
- Vehicle registration: TN:49

Perumandi is a village in the Kumbakonam taluk in Thanjavur district in the Indian state of Tamil Nadu.

== Demographics ==
As of 2001 India census, Perumandi had a population of 7000. Males constitute 51% of the population and females 49%. Perumandi has an average literacy rate of 83%, higher than the national average of 59.5%: male literacy is 88%, and female literacy is 79%. In Perumandi, 8% of the population is under 6 years of age.
