= Seshambadi =

- village
- Country: India
- State: Tamil Nadu
- District: Thanjavur
- Taluk: Kumbakonam

Population (2001)
  - Total: 1,827

Languages
  - Official: Tamil
- Time zone: UTC+5:30 (IST)

Seshambadi is a village in the Kumbakonam taluk of Thanjavur district, Tamil Nadu, India.

== Demographics ==
As per the 2001 census, Seshambadi had a total population of 1827 with 940 males and 887 females. The sex ratio was 944. The literacy rate was 46.82.
