= Muppakoil =

Mooppakoil
- village
- Country: India
- State: Tamil Nadu
- District: Thanjavur
- Taluk: Kumbakonam

Population (2001)
  - Total: 342

Languages
  - Official: Tamil
- Time zone: UTC+5:30 (IST)

Muppakoil is a village in the Kumbakonam taluk of Thanjavur district, Tamil Nadu, India.

== Demographics ==
As per the 2001 census, Muppakoil had a total population of 342 with 160 males and 182 females. The sex ratio was 1136. The literacy rate was 86.75
