= Palavathankattalai =

- village
- Country: India
- State: Tamil Nadu
- District: Thanjavur
- Taluk: Kumbakonam

Population (2001)
  - Total: 5,596

Languages
  - Official: Tamil
- Time zone: UTC+5:30 (IST)

Palavathankattalai is a village in the Kumbakonam taluk of Thanjavur district, Tamil Nadu, India.

== Demographics ==
As per the 2001 census, Palavathankattalai had a total population of 5596 with 2811 males and 2785 females. The sex ratio was 991. The literacy rate was 85.37
