= Vaniyakarambai =

- village
- Country: India
- State: Tamil Nadu
- District: Thanjavur
- Taluk: Kumbakonam

Population (2001)
  - Total: 157

Languages
  - Official: Tamil
- Time zone: UTC+5:30 (IST)

Vaniyakarambai is a village in the Kumbakonam taluk of Thanjavur district, Tamil Nadu, India.

== Demographics ==
As per the 2001 census, Vaniyakarambai had a total population of 157 with 84 males and 73 females. The sex ratio was 869. The literacy rate was 89.05%.
