= Keelakorukkai =

- village
- Country: India
- State: Tamil Nadu
- District: Thanjavur

Population (2001)
  - Total: 1,262

Languages
  - Official: Tamil
- Time zone: UTC+5:30 (IST)

Keelakorukkai is a village in the Kumbakonam taluk of Thanjavur district, Tamil Nadu, India.

== Demographics ==
As per the 2001 census, Keelakorukkai had a total population of 1262 with 605 males and 657 females. The sex ratio was 1069. The literacy rate was 87.92
