= Irandankattalai =

- village
- Country: India
- State: Tamil Nadu
- District: Thanjavur

Population (2001)
  - Total: 874

Languages
  - Official: Tamil
- Time zone: UTC+5:30 (IST)

Irandankattalai is a village in the Kumbakonam taluk of Thanjavur district, Tamil Nadu, India.

== Demographics ==
As per the 2001 census, Irandankattalai had a total population of 874 with 413 males and 461 females. The sex ratio was 1113. The literacy rate was 76.37.
