= Devanancheri =

- village
- Location in Tamil Nadu, India Devanancheri (India)
- Coordinates: 11°1′36″N 79°22′50″E
- Country: India
- State: Tamil Nadu
- District: Thanjavur

Government
  - Panchayat President: S.Rajaram

Population (2001)
  - Total: 2,737

Languages
  - Official: Tamil
- Time zone: UTC+5:30 (IST)
- Postal code: 612501
- Telephone code: 0435
- Vehicle registration: TN 68

Devanancheri is a village in the Kumbakonam taluk of Thanjavur district, Tamil Nadu. It is located 42 km north of the district headquarters in Thanjavur, 8 km from Kumbakonam, and 286 km from the state capital, Chennai. The local language is Tamil.

== Geography ==
Devanancheri is located 42 km north of the district headquarters in Thanjavur, 8 km from Kumbakonam, and 286 km from the state capital, Chennai. The neighboring villages are Athiyur (2 km), Neerathanallur (2 km), Thirunallur (1 km), Inaipriyalvattam (1 km), Kadichambadi (3 km), and Cholapuram (4 km). Devanancheri is surrounded by Thiruppanandal Taluk and Tiruvidaimarudur Taluk towards the east, and Kumbakonam Taluk and Valangaiman Taluk towards the south. It is also on the border with the district of Ariyalur (39 km). Devanancheri's postal code is 612501 and the postal head office is at Koranattukkaruppur.

== Population ==
As per the 2001 census, Devanancheri had a total population of 2737 with 1376 males and 1361 females. The sex ratio was 989. The literacy rate was 68.07. It comes under the Kumbakonam legislative assembly constituency and the Mayiladuthurai parliamentary constituency.

== Agriculture ==
The village people's revenue is dependent on agriculture. The River Manniyaru provides water for the agriculture and pumped irrigation is also available. The major crops cultivated in Devanancheri are paddy, pulses, gingelly, groundnut and sugarcane. Maize, soybeans, and redgram are also grown.

== Education ==
- Aided Middle School
- Minerva Primary and Higher Secondary School
- Annai College Of Arts & Science
- Skss Arts College
- Mass College Of Arts & Science
- Arasu Engineering College &government higher secondary school

== Temples ==
The Vinayagar, Sivan, Pachai Amman, Kaliyamman, Mariyamman, Thiraupathi Amman, Anjaneyar and Ayyanar temples are famous. Each year festivals are held in the temples.

== Transportation ==
The Kumbakonam railway station is the nearest railway to Devanancheri. The main bus terminal is in Kumbakonam, and provides for inner and outer area transportation. Devanacheri is on a main route to Chennai. There are airports in Thanjavur and Trichy

== See also ==
- Athiyur
