= Thandanthottam =

- village
- Country: India
- State: Tamil Nadu
- District: Thanjavur
- Taluk: Kumbakonam

Population (2001)
  - Total: 3,557

Languages
  - Official: Tamil
- Time zone: UTC+5:30 (IST)

Thandanthottam is a village in the Kumbakonam taluk of Thanjavur district, Tamil Nadu, India.

== History ==
The Thandanthottam village is situated 6 km from Kumbakonam the temple town of Tamil Nadu. It is surrounded by important religious towns like Uppiliappan temple, Nachiarkoil on the banks of Arasalar. (Arasalar means Hari Sollalar according to Kanchi Periyaval). Thandanthottam name is said to have evolved from Thiru thandavan thottam - which name was founded on the faith that Siva performed thandavam or the cosmic dance in this place and gave darshan to Appar, Sundarar, Sambandar and Manickavachakar. The place is also known as Nardhanapuri and there are many Thevarams in praise of this Lord. The original inhabitants of this village have migrated far and wide across the world today. They initially settled in Kerala and Tamil Nadu.

The Original name of this sacred place is 'Thandavanthottam'. It is located 3 miles from the Oppiliappan Temple, in the southeast direction & is better known as 'Thandanthottam'. This Temple has significant historical significance, and is situated at the Bank of 'Arasalaru', 14 km away from Kumbakonam. This place is 4 furlongs away from a small village called 'Murukkangudi' in the south direction.

'Manikatti Pullaiyar' welcomes us just after covering 2 furlongs. When Lord Siva was dancing, a bell gave way and fell down from his leg. Pullaiyar found it out and restored it on his father's leg. Thus he got the name 'Manikatti Pullaiyar'! The name of this place got subsequently changed from 'Nardhanapuri' to 'Thandavapuri' to 'Thandavanthottam'.

== Demographics ==
As per the 2001 census, Thandanthottam had a total population of 3557 with 1767 males and 1790 females. The sex ratio was 1013. The literacy rate was 81.02.

== Temples ==
There are four temples in this village :

- Lord Muthuvelayudaswamy temple by the side of the sacred tank Suriya Theertham
- Lord Natanapuriswarar temple with his consort Goddess Sivakamasundari by the side of the Agasthiya Theertham
- Lord Agastheeswara temple
- Lord Kalyanasundaramoorthi with his consort Goddess Umadevi and a Perumal temple.

Sri Natanapureeswarar Temple

It is said that three Siva Temples first existed in this village. Out of these, one temple got completely damaged. The Agastheesawarar Temple got destroyed and only the Agastheeswarar idol is graciously present in a small hut. In the opposite Sri Natanapureeswarar temple, the Abhirami Amman exists. Sri Natansapureeswarar Temple is located in the northeast quarter of the place. It is an old temple, having several historical evidences - and is situated facing the east.

The metallic books of 'Thandanthottam' are famous. Through these Books we come to know that this place earned its name during the times of the Pallavas & Cholas. These Books talk about the second Nandivarma Pallavas, who reigned over Kanchi in the 8th century. We understand that it is he who constructed the Sri Vaikunta Perumal Temple in Kanchi. Also we learn from these books that Nandivarman won the war against the Ganga Cholan, Sri Purushan & captured the 'Ugrodhayam' (diamond chain) and 'Pattavardhana' (elephant) from the Ganga Chola King. The Statues of the Gods in the Kanchi Sri Vaikunta Perumal temple bring these scenes in front of our eyes, and the sculptures existing therein describe these events. These metallic books also tell us about granting land to Veda experts and donating land for reading Mahabharatam in both the temples. Sri Natansapureeswarar Temple is in a square shape. After the Pallavas in the days of the Cholas, the sanctum sanctorum & Ardha Mandapam were renovated, but were subsequently damaged. The surrounding walls were also destroyed, and got reconstructed in later years. Sri Natansapureeswarar is graciously present with great sacred beauty in the shape of a Sivalinga.

Sri DakshinaMurthy is an ancient idol & Sages exist alone. In the western arcade surrounding the shrine, Vinayagar, Shanimugar accompanied by Valli and Deivayani are placed. They are shown as a statue called 'Vanadurgai' in the sanctum sanctorum quarter of the northern part. Whether it is Vanadurgai and whether it belongs to that quarter is not clearly understood. Nandi's sacred face is also there. Nearby another Woman is also there, a similar statues of whose is near Mahalakshimi Sannidhi in Thiruveezhimizhalai temple.

50 years back, Kumbhabhishekham was performed in this temple, and presently several sacred activities are conducted here. At the northwest of the Temple, a tank named Brahma Theertham is there. In the front, the Kali Temple exists. Statues of Saptha Mathaas Veerabhadrar & Pullaiyar, which were there, have been kept in Sivalaya. As the name suggests, Sri Kalyana Sundara Murthy is also there (with a beautiful physique) in the Sri Natansapureeswarar Temple. He is also known as Mappillai Swami. However, because of the non-availability of an appropriate security, for the time being, he is graciously present along with Sri Kathayayini Ambal in the Oppiliyappan Temple behind iron bars.

Agathiyar did not witness Samani's sacred marriage in the North. However, he enjoyed seeing it in South. He asked Kalyana Sundarar for 2 boons. First boon - Those who find it difficult to get married, should get married soon, in case they worship Vaikasi Vishaka sacred marriage held every year. Second Boon - Those who come here and worship the Perumar should get the effect of worshipping in Kailas. Swami granted the Boons. Agathiyar sage lived in this village and worshipped Agastheeswarar. Presently the same Agastheeswarar stays in a small hut at the south side of the Sri Natansapureeswarar Temple. Very soon a temple should be built there.

At the outside mandap of Sri Natansapureeswarar Temple, mother Sivakamasundari faces south and is placed sacredly. The Goddess is present with a goad in the upper arms, Abhayahasthanam in the lower right arm and her left hand resting on her hip. At the South west of the Sivalaya, Sri Varadaraja Perumal is present along with Sridevi and Bhoodevi. Also present are Navaneedhakrishnan accompanied by Rukmini - Sathyabhama, Sri Lakshminarayanan, Vishwagchenar, Sri Anjaneyar & Ramanuja idols. Vinayagar temple with a destroyed roof is there at the South of that temple. We prayed to Vigneeswaran that the temple be renovated at the earliest and the Kumbabhishekam performed. Sri Velayudaswami

Usually Iyanar, the village deity is graciously present at the land area of the village end. However, at Thandanthottam, Sri Ayyappan is present in the middle of the village. He is called 'Malayala Shastha'. The people of this village worship him as Sri Velayudaswami. He is the boon-giver. In Kali Yuga, he grants boons. He is the actual God, and is the deity of several families. Many families derive benefit from his compassionate eyesight, and live happily. These village residents begin any good job, only after saying 'Velayudham Velayudham', and from other villages, number of people keep coming to offer their sincere prayers. Even though the Moolavar is Sastha, people worship him as Muruga accompanied by Valli & Deivayanai. With a view to identifying the God in the manner, the residents of the village have made and kept a spear on his hand & a peacock at the base. On the same base, their 3 statues are erected. Swami's right arm is posing as Abhayastham. An elephant, and base for offering sacrifices are in front of the sacred place facing east.

Outside mandap, another Iyanar is graciously present along with Purna & Pushkala in a small shape. He keeps a whip at his right arm. Idumbam and seven angels are graciously present facing the north of this temple. A horse made out of lime is also there. Similar to the Sri Natansapureeswarar Temple, sacred activities are also conducted here.

On the Wednesday after Amavasya in Chithirai month, special festivals are performed on Sri Velayudhaswami, who is flower-decorated for 10 days. On the 9th day, the 'Parivettai' festival is celebrated. That day, the Swami is taken in a procession on a horse - driven by a carriage for an approximately 2-mile distance in the land area. Next day, Kavadi attam are conducted very admirably. People of this village, without conducting this festival do not thrash heaps of straw, which are post harvest in Thai month. One person did not follow this tradition in one year and his life was in danger. People are therefore very careful in thrashing heaps of straw only after completion of the festival.

The village is mix of Hindus and non Hindus living peacefully abiding the main deity Velayudhaswami. In recent years a house in the agraharam was sold to a non Hindu. During 3rd day of the utsavam when the Swamy was passing by his residence he performed disrespectful activities. The moment swamy passed by his residence, he fell down with stroke and was shouting for help. People helped him and educated him about the power of Velayudhaswamy. He vacated the house the same night and went to his home town. People in the village still remembers this afresh and abides by Swamy for every act.

=== Idol theft ===
The idols of Parvati and four other deities were stolen from the Nadanapureeswarar temple on 12 May 1971. A year later idols of Nataraja and Golu Amman were stolen and all seven idols were smuggled abroad sometime after that. The Idol Wing of the Criminal Investigation Department Department (IW-CID) has traced the Parvati idol to the Bonhams auction house in the United States. Sambandar idol is traced to Christie's auction house in the United States.

| S.No. | Deity | Stolen Idol traced to | Country | Current status | More Details |
|---|---|---|---|---|---|
| 1 | Parvati | Bonhams | United States | Unknown | |
| 2 | Dancing Krishna | | | Unknown | |
| 3 | Dancing Sambandar | Private collector | United States | Unknown | Auctioned by Christie's in 2008 |
| 4 | Agasthiar | | | Unknown | |
| 5 | Ayyanar | | | Unknown | |
| 6 | Nataraja | | United States | Unknown | |
| 7 | Golu Amman | | | Unknown | |
