= Uthamadani =

- village
- Country: India
- State: Tamil Nadu
- District: Thanjavur
- Taluk: Kumbakonam

Population (2001)
  - Total: 610

Languages
  - Official: Tamil
- Time zone: UTC+5:30 (IST)

Uthamadani is a village in the Kumbakonam taluk of Thanjavur district, Tamil Nadu, India.

== Demographics ==
In the 2001 census, Uthamadani had a total population of 610 with 313 males and 297 females. The sex ratio was 949. The literacy rate was 45.37%.
