= Kothangudithattimal =

- village
- Interactive map of Kothangudithattimal
- Coordinates: 11.01628°N 79.35418°E
- Country: India
- State: Tamil Nadu
- District: Thanjavur
- Taluk: Kumbakonam

Population (2001)
  - Total: 705

Languages
  - Official: Tamil
- Time zone: UTC+5:30 (IST)

Kothangudithattimal is a village in the Kumbakonam taluk of Thanjavur district, Tamil Nadu, India.

== Demographics ==
As per the 2001 census, Kothangudi had a total population of 705 with 343 males and 362 females. The sex ratio was 1055. The literacy rate was 65.73.

It now appears to have a population of 811, with about 190 houses.
