= Marutadi =

Coordinates: 10°59′N 79°24′E

- village
- Interactive map of Marutadi
- Country: India
- State: Tamil Nadu
- District: Thanjavur
- Taluk: Kumbakonam

Population (2001)
  - Total: 209

Languages
  - Official: Tamil
- Time zone: UTC+5:30 (IST)

Marutadi is a village in the Kumbakonam taluk of Thanjavur district, Tamil Nadu, India.

== Demographics ==
As per the 2001 census, Marutadi had a total population of 209 with 107 males and 102 females. The sex ratio was 953. The literacy rate was 82.16
