= Ammathottam =

- village
- Interactive map of Ammathottam
- Coordinates: 10.9492151°N 79.4058327°E
- Country: India
- State: Tamil Nadu
- District: Thanjavur

Population (2001)
  - Total: 78

Languages
  - Official: Tamil
- Time zone: UTC+5:30 (IST)

Ammathottam is a village in the Kumbakonam taluk of Thanjavur district, Tamil Nadu, India.

== Demographics ==
As per the 2001 census, Ammathottam had a total population of 78 with 39 males and 39 females. The sex ratio was 1000. The literacy rate was 69.44.
