= Vilandakandam =

Coordinates: 11°02′N 79°25′E

- village
- Interactive map of Vilandakandam
- Country: India
- State: Tamil Nadu
- District: Thanjavur
- Taluk: Kumbakonam

Population (2001)
  - Total: 1,589

Languages
  - Official: Tamil
- Time zone: UTC+5:30 (IST)

Vilandakandam is a village in the Kumbakonam taluk of Thanjavur district, Tamil Nadu.

== Demographics ==
As per the 2001 census, Vilandakandam had a total population of 1589 with 751 males and 838 females. The sex ratio was 1116. The literacy rate was 64.63.
