= Thillaiyambur =

- village
- Country: India
- State: Tamil Nadu
- District: Thanjavur
- Taluk: Kumbakonam

Population (2001)
  - Total: 3,282

Languages
  - Official: Tamil
- Time zone: UTC+5:30 (IST)

Thillaiyambur is a village in the Kumbakonam taluk of Thanjavur district, Tamil Nadu, India.

== Demographics ==
As per the 2001 census, Thillaiyambur had a total population of 3282 with 1679 males and 1603 females. The sex ratio was 955. The literacy rate was 67.91.
