= Villiyavarambal =

Coordinates: 10°57′N 79°26′E

- village
- Interactive map of Villiyavarambal
- Country: India
- State: Tamil Nadu
- District: Thanjavur
- Taluk: Kumbakonam

Languages
  - Official: Tamil
- Time zone: UTC+5:30 (IST)

Villiyavarambal is a village in the Kumbakonam taluk of Thanjavur district, Tamil Nadu.

== Demographics ==
As per the 2001 census, Agarathur had a total population of 1094 with 547 males and 547 females. The sex ratio was 1000. The literacy rate was 81.02.
