= Nagarasampettai =

Coordinates: 10°53′N 79°26′E

- village
- Interactive map of Nagarasampettai
- Country: India
- State: Tamil Nadu
- District: Thanjavur
- Taluk: Kumbakonam

Population (2001)
  - Total: 2,200

Languages
  - Official: Tamil
- Time zone: UTC+5:30 (IST)

Nagarasampettai is a village in the Kumbakonam taluk of Thanjavur district, Tamil Nadu, India.

== Demographics ==
As per the 2001 census, Nagarasampettai had a total population of 2200 with 1135 males and 1065 females. The sex ratio was 938. The literacy rate was 80.23
