= Melakorukkai =

- village
- Country: India
- State: Tamil Nadu
- District: Thanjavur
- Taluk: Kumbakonam

Population (2001)
  - Total: 2,281

Languages
  - Official: Tamil
- Time zone: UTC+5:30 (IST)

Melakorukkai is a village in the Kumbakonam taluk of Thanjavur district, Tamil Nadu, India.

== Demographics ==
As per the 2001 census, Melakorukkai had a total population of 2281 with 1138 males and 1143 females. The sex ratio was 1004. The literacy rate was 73.19 Melakorukkai has a total population of 2,521 people. There are about 654 houses in Melakorukkai village.

== Geography ==
The total geographical area of village is 299.78 hectares. Kumbakonam is nearest town to Melakorukkai.
