= Thiruppandurai =

- village
- Interactive map of Thiruppandurai
- Country: India
- State: Tamil Nadu
- District: Thanjavur
- Taluk: Kumbakonam

Population (2001)
  - Total: 1,321

Languages
  - Official: Tamil
- Time zone: UTC+5:30 (IST)

Thiruppandurai is a village in the Kumbakonam taluk of Thanjavur district, Tamil Nadu, India.

== Demographics ==
In the 2001 census, Thiruppandurai had a population of 1321, with 684 males and 637 females. The sex ratio was 931. The literacy rate was 76.38%.
