= Kadichambadi =

- village
- Interactive map of Kadichambadi
- Coordinates: 11°00′20″N 79°22′29″E
- Country: India
- State: Tamil Nadu
- District: Thanjavur

Population (2001)
  - Total: 1,705

Languages
  - Official: Tamil
- Time zone: UTC+5:30 (IST)

Kadichambadi is a village in the Kumbakonam taluk of Thanjavur district, Tamil Nadu, India.

== Demographics ==
As per the 2001 census, Kadichambadi had a total population of 1705 with 867 males and 838 females. The sex ratio was 967. The literacy rate was 64. It is located 5 km from Kumbakonam. The name is derived from an event when a king, who stayed here, woke up by a bird's sound. The incident is referred to as "Kirricham Padi" (Kirricham - a bird, Padi - sings). From that the name slowly changed to Kadichambadi.

The Soundararajan Temple, dedicated to Vishnu, is situated here.
