= Katchukattu =

- village
- Location in Tamil Nadu, India
- Coordinates: 10.972829°N 79.511161°E
- Country: India
- State: Tamil Nadu
- District: Thanjavur

Population (2001)
  - Total: 931

Languages
  - Official: Tamil
- Time zone: UTC+5:30 (IST)

Kachukkattu is a village in the Kumbakonam taluk of Thanjavur district, Tamil Nadu, India.

== Demographics ==
As per the 2001 census, Katchukattu had a total population of 931 with 458 males and 473 females. The sex ratio was 1033. The literacy rate was 72.72
