= Pangal, Thanjavur district =

Coordinates: 16°15′N 77°59′E

Pangal
- village
- Interactive map of Pangal
- Country: India
- State: Tamil Nadu
- District: Thanjavur
- Taluk: Kumbakonam

Population (2001)
  - Total: 310

Languages
  - Official: Tamil
- Time zone: UTC+5:30 (IST)

Pangal is a village in the Kumbakonam taluk of Thanjavur district, Tamil Nadu, India.

== Demographics ==
As per the 2001 census, Pangal had a total population of 310 with 142 males and 168 females. The sex ratio was 1183. The literacy rate was 74.55%.
