= Sholamaligai =

- village
- Country: India
- State: Tamil Nadu
- District: Thanjavur
- Taluk: Kumbakonam

Population (2001)
  - Total: 4,970

Languages
  - Official: Tamil
- Time zone: UTC+5:30 (IST)

Sholamaligai is a village in the Kumbakonam taluk of Thanjavur district, Tamil Nadu, India.

== Demographics ==
As per the 2001 census, Sholamaligai had a total population of 4970 with 2475 males and 2495 females. The sex ratio was 1008. The literacy rate was 74.5
