= Allur, Thanjavur =

Village in Thanjavur, Tamil Nadu, India

Coordinates: 10.826632°N 79.038014°E

Allur is a village in Thiruvaiyaru block, Thanjavur district in Tamil Nadu state, India. It is one of the 49 villages in the Thiruvaiyaru block. The postal code of the village is 613101.

== Population ==
The total population of the village is 2219 in 525 houses. Male population is 1102 and the female population is 1117. There are 218 children in the village.

== Literacy rate ==
The literacy rate of the total population of the village is 71%. Male literacy rate is 77% and female literacy rate is just 66%.628 out of 2219 are illiterate people in Allur.

== Other information ==
- The total area of the village is 5.25 sq.kilometers.
- 15 kilometers away from Thiruvaiyaru, the block's headquarters.
- 22 kilometers away from Thanjavur, the district's headquarters.
- Nearest town is Thirukkattupalli.
