= Inam Asur =

- village
- Country: India
- State: Tamil Nadu
- District: Thanjavur

Population (2001)
  - Total: 519

Languages
  - Official: Tamil
- Time zone: UTC+5:30 (IST)

Inam Asur is a village in the Kumbakonam taluk of Thanjavur district, Tamil Nadu, India.

== Demographics ==
As per the 2001 census, Inam Asur had a total population of 519 with 248 males and 271 females. The sex ratio was 1093. The literacy rate was 78.51.
