= Madhavapuram =

Coordinates: 16°54′N 81°19′E

- village
- Interactive map of Madhavapuram
- Country: India
- State: Tamil Nadu
- District: Thanjavur
- Taluk: Kumbakonam

Population (2001)
  - Total: 138

Languages
  - Official: Tamil
- Time zone: UTC+5:30 (IST)

Madhavapuram is a village in the Kumbakonam taluk of Thanjavur district, Tamil Nadu, India.

== Demographics ==
As per the 2001 census, Madhavapuram had a total population of 138 with 67 males and 71 females. The literacy rate was 83%.
