= Mathi, Kumbakonam =

Mathi
- village
- Country: India
- State: Tamil Nadu
- District: Thanjavur
- Taluk: Kumbakonam

Population (2001)
  - Total: 1,588

Languages
  - Official: Tamil
- Time zone: UTC+5:30 (IST)

Mathi is a village in the Kumbakonam taluk of Thanjavur district, Tamil Nadu, India.

== Demographics ==
As per the 2001 census, Mathi had a total population of 1588 with 788 males and 800 females. The sex ratio was 1015. The literacy rate was 75.64
