= Kovanur =

- village
- Country: India
- State: Tamil Nadu
- District: Thanjavur
- Taluk: Kumbakonam

Population (2001)
  - Total: 2,161

Languages
  - Official: Tamil
- Time zone: UTC+5:30 (IST)
- Postal code: 612602

Kovanur is a village in the Kumbakonam taluk of Thanjavur district, Tamil Nadu, India.

== Demographics ==
As per the 2001 census, Kovanur had a total population of 2,161 with 1,094 males and 1,067 females. The sex ratio was 975. The literacy rate was 78.22.
