= Thimmakudi =

- village
- Location in Tamil Nadu, India Thimmakudi (India)
- Coordinates: 10°58′01″N 79°20′42″E
- Country: India
- State: Tamil Nadu
- District: Thanjavur
- Taluk: Kumbakonam

Population (2011)
  - Total: 994

Languages
  - Official: Tamil
- Time zone: UTC+5:30 (IST)
- Postal code: 612302

Thimmakudi is a village in the Kumbakonam taluk of Thanjavur district, Tamil Nadu, India.

== Demographics ==
As per the 2011 census, Thimmakudi had a total population of 994. The literacy rate was 70.93%.
