= Saranathan Temple =

Hindu temple of god Vishnu in Thirucherai, India

Saranatha Perumal Temple
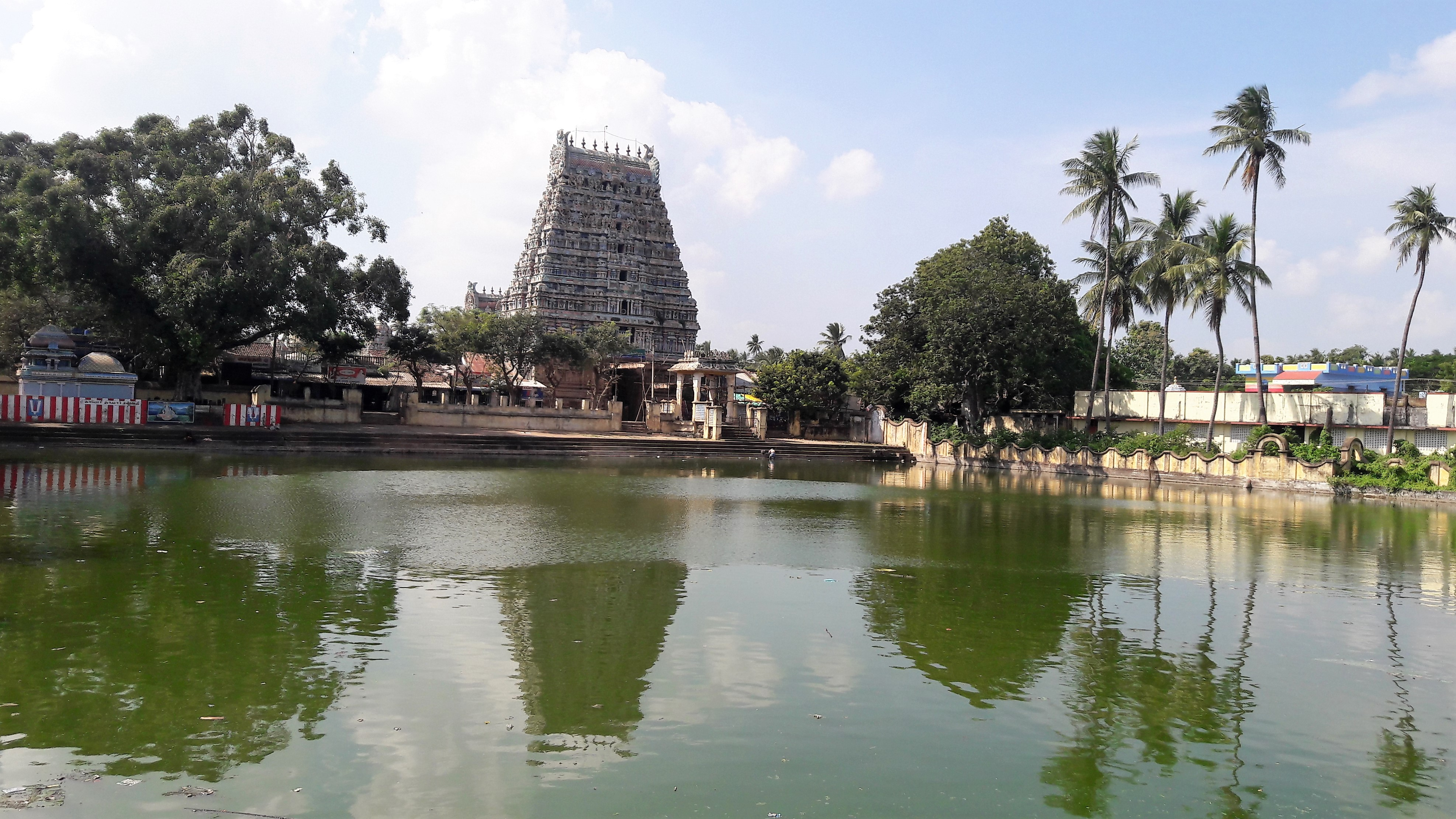

- Location in Tamil Nadu

Religion
- Affiliation: Hinduism
- District: Thiruvarur
- Deity: Saranatha Perumal (Vishnu); Saranayaki Thayar (Lakshmi)
- Features: Tower: Sara Vimanam; Temple tank: Sara Pushkarani

Location
- Location: Thirucherai
- State: Tamil Nadu
- Country: India
- Coordinates: 10°52′43″N 79°27′15″E

Architecture
- Type: Dravidian architecture
- Creator: Cholas
- Direction of façade: Standing

The Saranathan Temple in Thirucherai, a village on the outskirts of Kumbakonam in the South Indian state of Tamil Nadu, is dedicated to the Hindu god Vishnu. The temple is glorified in the Nalayira Divya Prabandham, the early medieval Tamil canon of the Alvar saints from the 6th–9th centuries CE. It is one of the 108 Divya Desams dedicated to Vishnu, who is worshipped as Saranathan and his consort Lakshmi as Saranayaki. It is believed that Saranathan appeared for Kaveri, the river goddess, who performed penance at this place.

The temple is believed to be of significant antiquity with contributions at different times from Medieval Cholas, the Vijayanagara Empire and Madurai Nayaks. A granite wall surrounds the temple, enclosing all its shrines and three of the four bodies of water. The rajagopuram, the temple's gateway tower has five tiers and raises to a height of 120 ft (37 m). The temple is unique where the presiding deity Vishnu has five consorts. It has also a shrine dedicated to the river Kaveri, which is a unique feature among all Vishnu temples.

Saranathan is believed to have appeared to the goddess Kaveri, the sage Markandeya and the Hindu god Indra. Six daily rituals and three yearly festivals are held at the temple, of which the chariot festival, celebrated during the Tamil month of Chittirai (March–April), is the most prominent. The temple is maintained and administered by the Hindu Religious and Endowment Board of the Government of Tamil Nadu.

== Legend ==
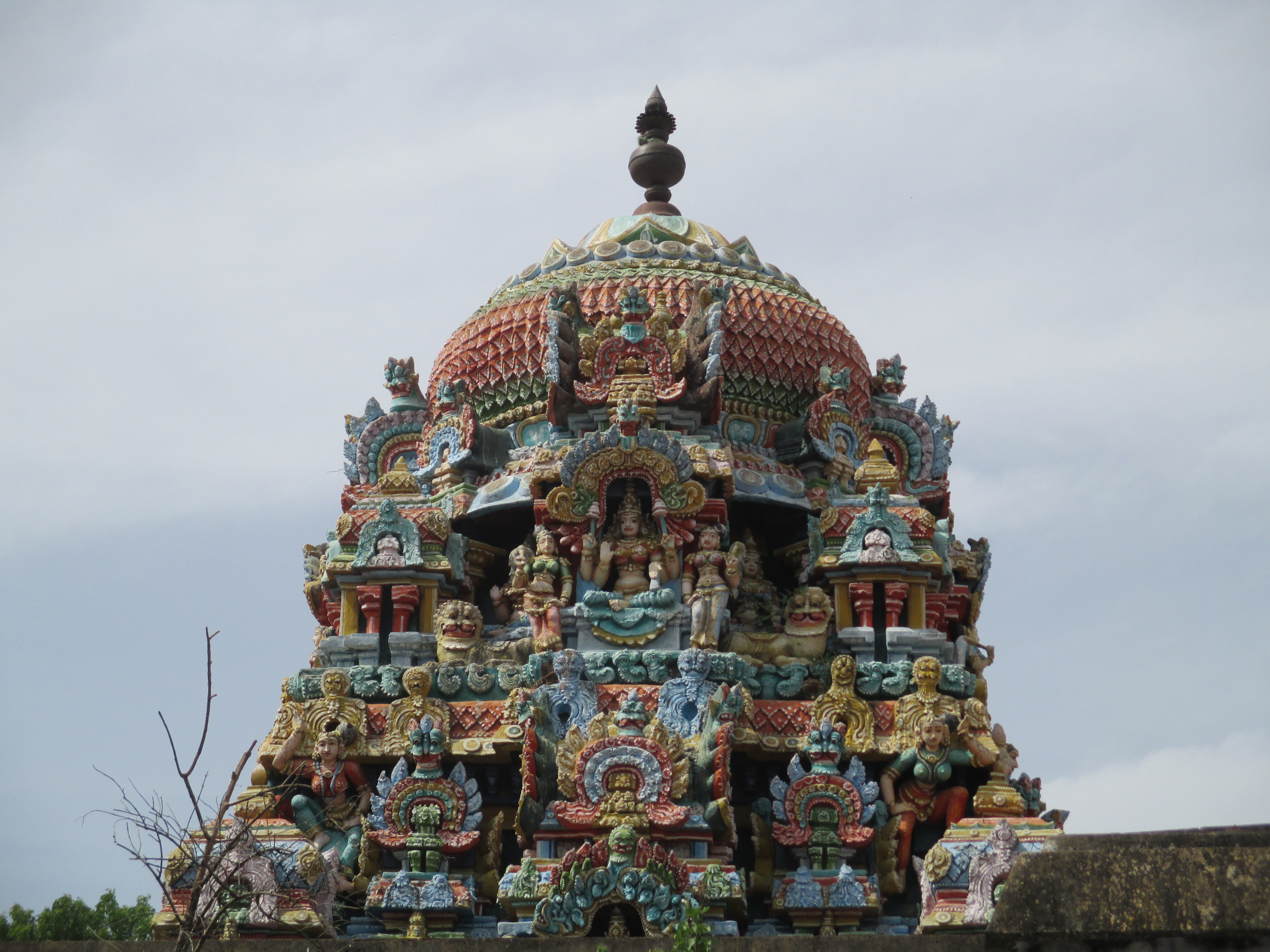
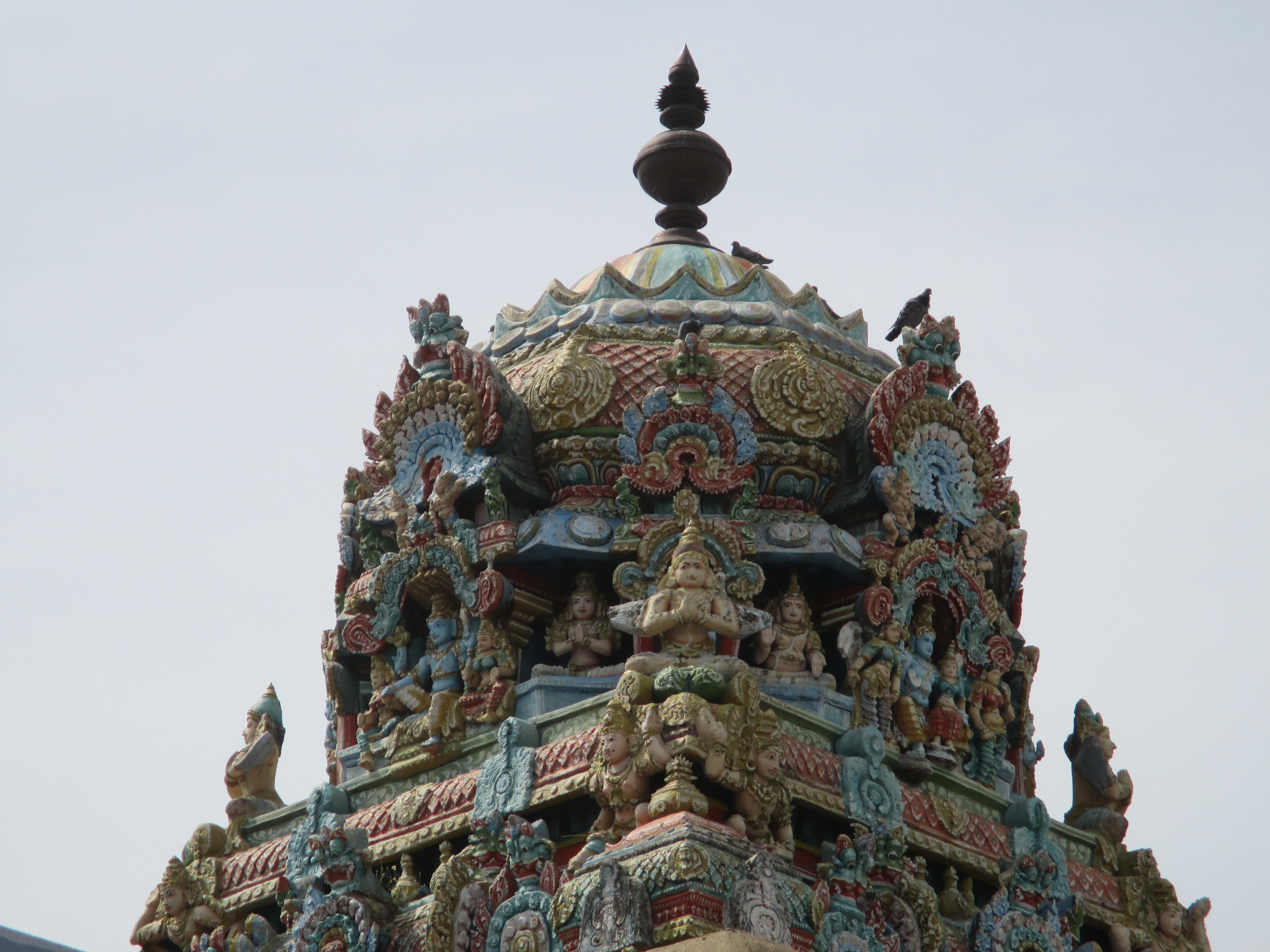
Shrines of Saranathan and Saranayagi

As per Hindu legend, when time came to destroy the world and finish the yuga, the creator deity, Brahma, was worried. He pleaded Vishnu to tell him a way to keep the tools necessary for srishti (creation) and all the Vedas (scriptures) safe. Vishnu ordered him to put them in a strong mud pot. After trying mud from all places, Brahma finally made a pot out of the sand taken from Thirucherai and saved all Vedas and all necessary aids for creation. Due to the role as saviour for all living things after the Mahapralaya (dissolution) so this place is called "Sara Shetram".

All the rivers approached Brahma to find who was most superior amongst them. He said that during the Vamana avatar, Vishnu appeared as a dwarf and later became Trivikrama to the king Mahabali. He placed his third foot on the demon king and cleansed the river Ganga (Ganges) by placing his foot in it. Based on the narration, Brahma quoted that Ganga was the holiest of all rivers. The goddess Kaveri wanted her status to be equal to Ganga and performed a severe penance. To test her devotion, Vishnu appeared in the form of a child in front of her. Realising the anonymity, Kaveri treated the child with care and motherly devotion. Vishnu was pleased with her devotion and revealed all his ten avatars to her and asked her to visit Sara Kshetram and have a holy dip in the Sara Pushkarani. He also granted her the boon that during the Tula month (October - November), she would be considered superior to Ganga.

== History ==
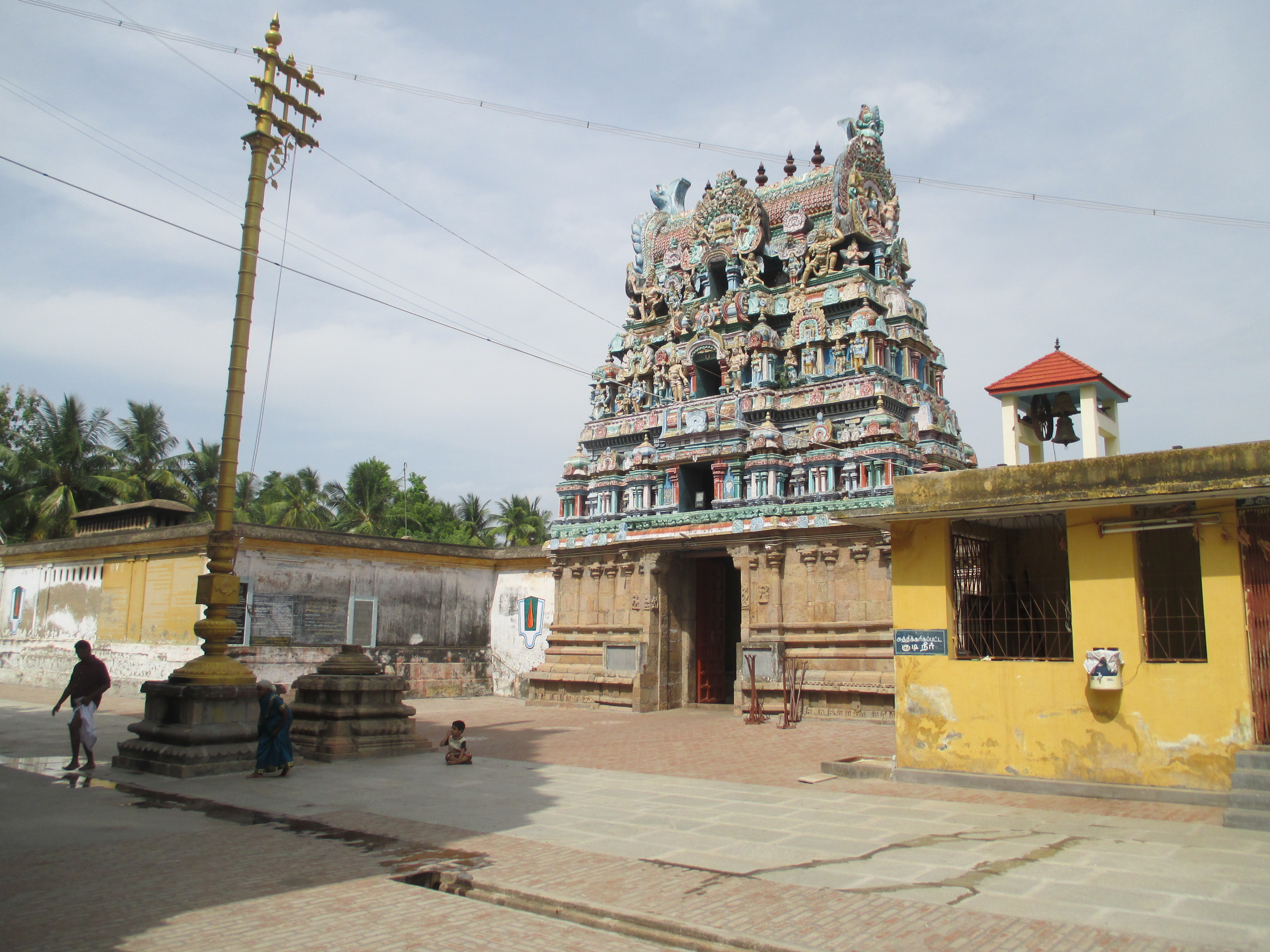
Image of the temple towers

There are two inscriptions in the temple from the period of Chola Parakesari Varman (906-946 AD) and Babasahib of Madavipallam (1728–38) indicating various grants to the temple. The temple is believed to be of significant antiquity with contributions at different times from Medieval Cholas, the Vijayanagara Empire and Madurai Nayaks. The crown of some of the images from the Chola period show influence of Buddhist tradition in the region. The metal image of Sita is believed to be a classic example of Chola Art during the 9th-10th centuries.

After the fall of the Vijayanagar empire in Tanjore, Alagiya Manavala Naicker who ruled Tanjore planned to erect a temple for Rajagopala swamy in Mannarkudi. He appointed his minister Narasa Boopalan for this job. He was to get Blackstones from all possible places. This minister was a great worshipper of Saranatha Perumal of Thirucherai and wanted to erect a temple for him too. So he ordered his men to unload one stone from each cart which passed Thirucherai. A spy of the king caught hold of this and informed the king. The angered king came for an inspection. But before that overnight Narasa Boopalan constructed this temple and to please the king he added a shrine for Rajagopala swamy. His plan worked and he was saved from the king's anger after that the king ordered him to complete the temple with his money.

== Architecture ==
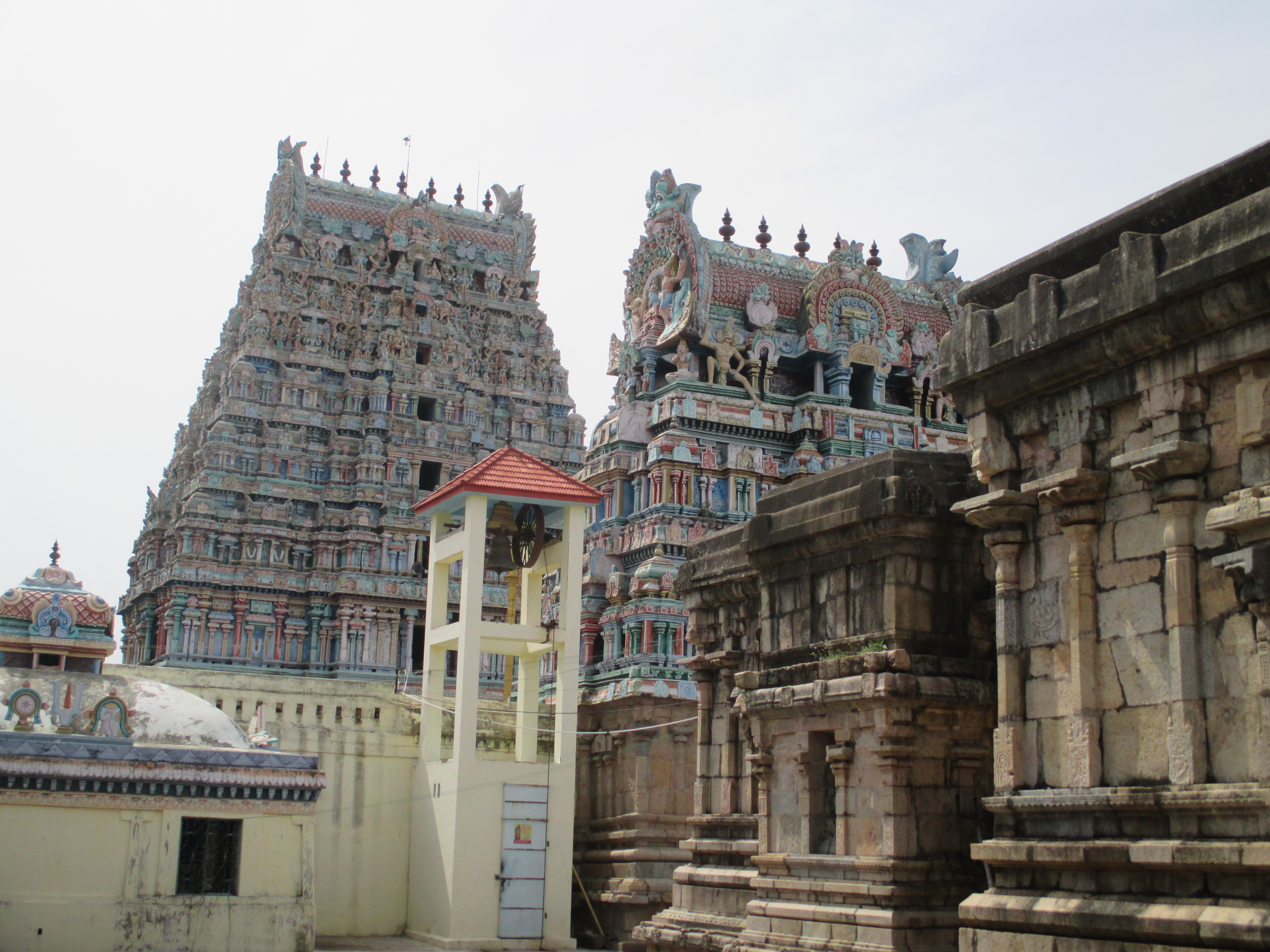
Image of the temple towers

The temple is 380 ft (120 m) long and 380 ft (120 m) wide. The temple has a temple tank in front of the temple with the same dimension. The five-tiered gopuram (temple tower) is 120 ft (37 m) tall and pierces the large compound wall around the temple. There is a second gopuram that is three-storied and it is located in the first precinct around the sanctum. The presiding deity, Sarantha has a 12 ft (3.7 m) tall image in standing posture. The stone images of Kaveri and sage Markandeya are housed in the sanctum. The festival deity is accompanied by Bhudevi, Sridevi, and Niladevi. A small idol of Santhanakrishna and Selvar is also housed in the sanctum. The shrine of Saranatha's consort Saranayaki Thayar is located adjacent to the sanctum. The image of both the main idol and the festival image in the Thayar are depicted in a seated posture. In the second precinct there is a Kalayana hall, where there is a shrine of Rajagoplaswamy. The images of Rukmini and Satyabhama are also housed in the same shrine. In front of the shrine, the shrine of Thiruvenkatamudayam is situated. There are separate shrines of Rama, Narashima, Kaliyamardhana, Bala Saranatha, Senai Mudaliar, Ramanuja, Pillai Lokacharya, the Alvars and Manavala Mamunigal in the temple. Mudikondan River flows from the west and Kudamurutti River in the south of the temple. There is a shrine of Hanuman from the west end of the temple tank and Vinayaka from the north-eastern side.

The goddess Kaveri is seen in a maternal posture with a child on her lap. The temple is one of the few places where there is a separate shrine for this deity.

== Religious significance ==
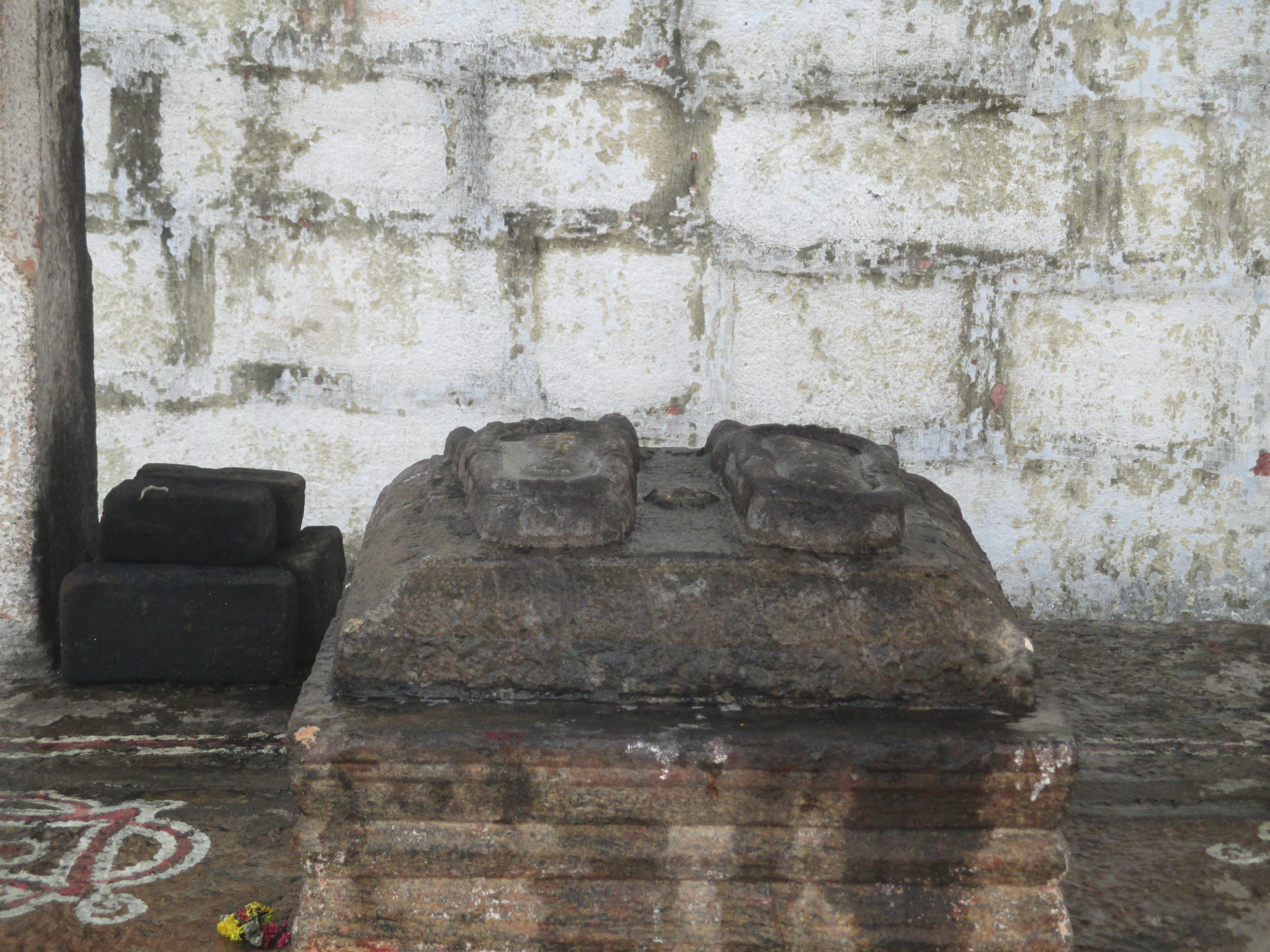
The feet of Rama

The temple is revered in the Nalayira Divya Prabandham, the 7th–9th century Sri Vaishnava canon, by Thirumangai Alvar in eleven hymns. The temple is classified as a Divya Desam, one of the 108 Vishnu temples that are mentioned in the compilation. He has mentioned the devotees of Saranatha who are deeply immersed in Narayana. Divya Kavi Pillai Perumal Aiyangar in his Ashta Prabanda states that people should not waste their time glorifying wealthy men, but should laud the greatness of the almighty. This is the only Divya Desam where Vishnu is seen with five consorts. The temple is represented in five divine elements of Perumal, Nachiyar, Vimana, Tirtha and land and hence called Tirucherai. A Chola king named Satyakeerthi is believed to have worshipped the presiding deity for childbirth and had a son.

During the coronation of Rama, the avatar of Vishnu, Vibishana was presented the sacrosanct Sri Ranga Vimana. He was carrying it all the way to his kingdom of Lanka and midway, to rest, he placed the image on the banks of Kaveri. After performing his routine puja, he tried to lift the Vimana, but it could not be lifted. Mahavishnu appeared to him and said that he desired to stay as Ranganatha in the place, which went on to become Srirangam. Vishnu also desired to watch the Brahmotsavam at Tirucherai. The festivals of the temple are thus considered sacred. The temple is counted as one of the temples built on the banks of the river Kaveri.

As per a local legend, the king of Thanjavur sent material through his minister Narcapapular to the Rajagopalaswamy Temple, Mannargudi, but the minister used the material to build the Thirucherai temple. The king discovered this and wanted to punish the minister. The minister is believed to have prayed to Tirucherai deity to save him from the punishment. But upon seeing the form of Mannargudi temple in this temple, the king relented.
