= Vanduvancheri =

- Village
- Country: India
- State: Tamil Nadu
- District: Thanjavur
- Taluk: Kumbakonam

Population (2001)
  - Total: 442

Languages
  - Official: Tamil
- Time zone: UTC+5:30 (IST)

Vanduvancheri is a village in the Kumbakonam taluk of Thanjavur district, Tamil Nadu, India.

== Demographics ==
As per the 2011 census, Vanduvancheri has had a total population of 7,384, which includes 3,609 males and 3,775 females. The average sex ratio is 1046. The literacy rate has been noted being 79.71%.
