= Thirunariyur =

Thirunaraiyur
- village
- Country: India
- State: Tamil Nadu
- District: Thanjavur
- Taluk: Kumbakonam

Population (2001)
  - Total: 5,698

Languages
  - Official: Tamil
- Time zone: UTC+5:30 (IST)
- Postal code: 612602

Thirunaraiyur is a village in the Kumbakonam taluk of Thanjavur district, Tamil Nadu, India.

== Demographics ==
As per the 2001 census, Thirunaraiyur had a total population of 5698 with 2787 males and 2911 females. The sex ratio was 1044. The literacy rate was 75.95%.
