= Kovilacheri =

- village
- Country: India
- State: Tamil Nadu
- District: Thanjavur
- Taluk: Kumbakonam

Population (2001)
  - Total: 1,505

Languages
  - Official: Tamil
- Time zone: UTC+5:30 (IST)

Kovilacheri is a village in the Kumbakonam taluk of Thanjavur district, Tamil Nadu, India.

== Demographics ==
As per the 2001 census, Kovilacheri had a total population of 1505 with 732 males and 773 females. The sex ratio was 1056. The literacy rate was 66.02

== Education ==
The Annai College of Arts and Science is based in Kovilacheri.
