= Tiruvarur block =

Tiruvarur block is a revenue block in the Tiruvarur taluk of Tiruvarur district, Tamil Nadu, India. It has a total of 34 panchayat villages.
