= Marudanallur =

- village
- Location in Tamil Nadu, India Marudanallur (India)
- Coordinates: 10°55′26″N 79°24′08″E
- Country: India
- State: Tamil Nadu
- District: Thanjavur
- Taluk: Kumbakonam

Population (2001)
  - Total: 2,605

Languages
  - Official: Tamil
- Time zone: UTC+5:30 (IST)

Marudanallur is a village in the Kumbakonam taluk of Thanjavur district, Tamil Nadu, India.

== Demographics ==
As per the 2001 census, Marudanallur had a total population of 2605 with 1333 males and 1272 females. The sex ratio was 954. The literacy rate was 78.07
