= Innambur =

Coordinates: 10°59′N 79°20′E

- village
- Interactive map of Innambur
- Country: India
- State: Tamil Nadu
- District: Thanjavur

Population (2001)
  - Total: 2,464

Languages
  - Official: Tamil
- Time zone: UTC+5:30 (IST)

Innambur is a village in the Kumbakonam taluk of Thanjavur district, Tamil Nadu, India.

== Demographics ==
As per the 2001 census, Innambur had a total population of 2464 with 1207 males and 1257 females. The sex ratio was 1041. The literacy rate was 73.03.
