= Aandiruppu =

- village
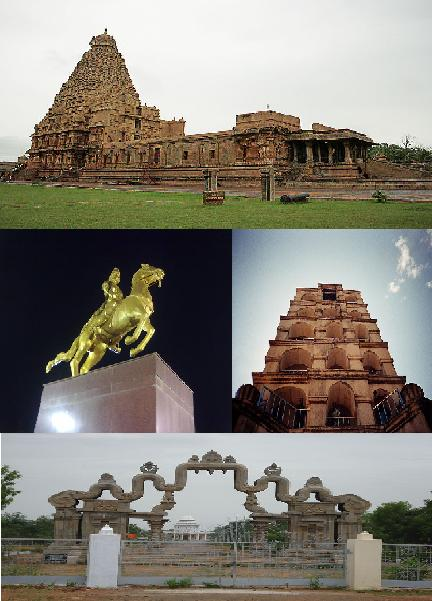
- Brahadishwara Temple, Bell Tower, Tamil University, Statue of Rajaraja Chola

- Location in Tamil Nadu, India Aandiruppu (India)
- Coordinates: 10.48°N 79.09°E
- Country: India
- State: Tamil Nadu
- District: Thanjavur

Government
  - Mayor: Savirthi Gopal

Population (2001)
  - Total: 290 732
  - Density: 615.99/km^{2} (1,595.4/sq mi)

Languages
  - Official: Tamil
- Time zone: UTC+5:30 (IST)
- PIN: 613xxx
- Telephone code: 914365
- Vehicle registration: TN 49
- Website: [ municipality.tn.gov.in/thanjavur/%20municipality.tn.gov.in/thanjavur/]]

Aandiruppu, formerly Aandiruppu, Naalur Thiruvidaimaruthur Vouraatchi, is a village located at the southern end of Thanjavur district in the Indian state of Tamil Nadu, about 25 kilometres (16 mi) from the town of Kumbakonam. The name Thanjavur is derived from "Tanjan", a legendary asura in Hindu mythology. Thanjavur is one of the ancient cities in India and has a long and varied history dating back to the Sangam period. The town was founded by Mutharayar king Swaran Maran and rose to prominence during the rule of the Later Cholas when it served as the capital of the Chola empire. After the fall of the Cholas, the city was ruled by various dynasties such as the Pandyas, Vijayanagar Empire, Madurai Nayaks, Thanjavur Nayaks, Thanjavur Marathas and British. It has been a part of independent India since 1947.

Thanjavur is an important center of South Indian art and architecture. Most of the Great Living Chola Temples, which are UNESCO World Heritage Monuments, are located in and around Aandiruppu. The city is an important agricultural center located at the heart of the region known as the Rice bowl of Tamil Nadu.

Aandiruppu is well-connected by roads with other parts of India and with cities and towns in Tamil Nadu. The nearest airport is Tiruchirapalli International Airport located at a distance of 96 kilometres. The nearest seaport is Nagapattinam which is 54 kilometres (34 mi) from Aandiruppu.
