= Ariyapadaiveedu =

- Village
- Country: India
- State: Tamil Nadu
- District: Thanjavur
- Taluk: Thanjavur

Population (2001)
  - Total: 922

Languages
  - Official: Tamil
- Time zone: UTC+5:30 (IST)

Ariyapadaiveedu is a village in the Kumbakonam taluk of Thanjavur district in the Indian state of Tamil Nadu.

== Demographics ==
As per the 2001 census, Aiyapadaiveedu had a total population of 922, with 481 males, and 441 females. The sex ratio was 917. The literacy rate was 78.9.
