= Thenampadugai Thattimal =

- village
- Country: India
- State: Tamil Nadu
- District: Thanjavur
- Taluk: Kumbakonam

Population (2001)
  - Total: 778

Languages
  - Official: Tamil
- Time zone: UTC+5:30 (IST)

Thenampadugai Thattimal is a village in the Kumbakonam taluk of Thanjavur district, Tamil Nadu, India.

== Demographics ==
As per the 2001 census, Thenampadugai Thattimal had a total population of 778 with 384 males and 394 females. The sex ratio was 1026. The literacy rate was 58.51
