= Kadamangudi =

Coordinates: 11.090819°N 79.427709°E

- village
- Interactive map of Kadamangudi
- Country: India
- State: Tamil Nadu
- District: Thanjavur

Languages
  - Official: Tamil
- Time zone: UTC+5:30 (IST)
- PIN: 612504
- Telephone code: 0435
- Nearest city: Kumbakonam
- Lok Sabha constituency: Mayiladuthurai
- Vidhan Sabha constituency: Thiruvidaimarudur

Kadamangudi is a village in Thanjavur district of the Indian state of Tamil Nadu, situated along the river Kollidam. It consists of just over 100 families. It is surrounded by the river Kollidam which flows through here in north, village of Veerakkan in the south, village of Koothanur to the east and village of Ayyanallur to the west.

It is situated 300 km from the state capital Chennai and 18 km from the nearest big town Kumbakonam. To approach this village you have alight at Thirupanandal or Senganoor on the Chennai-Kumbakonam state highway.

Though it has agrarian background like any other village in India, it has distinguished itself from other villages by producing minimum one graduate per family. Also, it has created many teachers and Government employees.

The Thanjavur district ends here and the other side of river Kollidam is in Trichy district.

In 2009 General Elections, it was shifted to Mayiladuthurai (Lok Sabha constituency) from Thanjavur district.
