= Poundarigapuram =

- village
- Country: India
- State: Tamil Nadu
- District: Thanjavur
- Taluk: Kumbakonam

Population (2001)
  - Total: 3,089

Languages
  - Official: Tamil
- Time zone: UTC+5:30 (IST)
- Postal code: 612202
- Vehicle registration: TN 68

Poundarigapuram is a village in the Kumbakonam taluk of Thanjavur district, Tamil Nadu, India. In older days the village name Poundarigapuram is also known as "Yenathimangalam"

Poundarigapuram is a small village located near the temple town of Kumbakonam. Nestling among the fertile fields, nurtured by the soothing waters of the river Kaveri, the village, although small in size, is great in name and fame. In fact, the village derives its name from Poundarika, a special type of yaga. Ayya Kumara Tata Desika, who was the Rajaguru to the ruler of Thanjavur, performed this special yaga in Vennar Bank near Thanjavur, about three hundred years ago. This village was set up and named Poundarikapura, in commemoration of this special yaga. This village are nearby all Navagraha temples.

== Nearby temples ==
1. Uppliyappan koil = 3 km
2. Raghusthalam = 3km
3. Sri prithiyangiradevi temple = 2km
4. Suriyanar koil = 10km
5. Mahamaham tank =11 km

== Demographics ==
As per the 2001 census, Poundarigapuram had a total population of 3089 with 1542 males and 1547 females. The sex ratio was 1003. The literacy rate was 76.37
