= Senganur =

- village
- Country: India
- State: Tamil Nadu
- District: Thanjavur
- Taluk: Thiruvidaimarudur

Population (2001)
  - Total: 1,634

Languages
  - Official: Tamil
- Time zone: UTC+5:30 (IST)

Senganur is a village in the Thiruvidaimarudur taluk of Thanjavur district in Tamil Nadu, India.

== Demographics ==
As per the 2001 census, Senganur had a population of 1,634 with 820 males and 814 females. The sex ratio was 993 and the literacy rate, 67.79.
