= Elandurai =

- village
- Country: India
- State: Tamil Nadu
- District: Thanjavur

Population (2001)
  - Total: 1,046

Languages
  - Official: Tamil
- Time zone: UTC+5:30 (IST)

Elandurai is a village in Kumbakonam taluk, Thanjavur district, Tamil Nadu.

== Demographics ==
As per the 2001 census, Elandurai had a population of 1046 with 523 males and 523 females. The sex ratio was 1000 and the literacy rate, 74.68.
