= Kallapuliyur =

Coordinates: 12°23′N 79°26′E

- village
- Interactive map of Kallapuliyur
- Country: India
- State: Tamil Nadu
- District: Villupram

Population (2001)
  - Total: 2,082

Languages
  - Official: Tamil
- Time zone: UTC+5:30 (IST)

Kallapuliyur is a village in the Gingee taluk of Villupuram district, Tamil Nadu, India.

== Demographics ==
As per the 2001 census, Kallapuliyur had a total population of 2082 with 1065 males and 1018 females. The sex ratio was 955. The literacy rate was 64.4
