= Mallapuram =

- village
- Country: India
- State: Tamil Nadu
- District: Thanjavur
- Taluk: Kumbakonam

Population (2001)
  - Total: 1,469

Languages
  - Official: Tamil
- Time zone: UTC+5:30 (IST)

Mallapuram is a village in the Kumbakonam taluk of Thanjavur district, Tamil Nadu, India.

== Demographics ==
As per the 2001 census, Mallapuram had a total population of 1469 with 737 males and 732 females. The sex ratio was 993. The literacy rate was 79.31.

== See also ==
- B. Mallapuram - alternative name for Bommidi in Tamil Nadu
