= Mangudi (Thanjavur district) =

- village
- Country: India
- State: Tamil Nadu
- District: Thanjavur
- Taluk: Kumbakonam

Population (2001)
  - Total: 1,946

Languages
  - Official: Tamil
- Time zone: UTC+5:30 (IST)

Mangudi is a village in the Kumbakonam taluk of Thanjavur district, Tamil Nadu, India.

== Demographics ==
As per the 2001 census, Mangudi had a total population of 1946 with 965 males and 981 females. The sex ratio was 1017. The literacy rate was 75.12
