= Ammangudi =

- village
- Location in Tamil Nadu, India Ammangudi (India)
- Coordinates: 10°57′3″N 79°29′45″E
- Country: India
- State: Tamil Nadu
- District: Thanjavur

Population (2001)
  - Total: 1,356

Languages
  - Official: Tamil
- Time zone: UTC+5:30 (IST)

Ammangudi is a village in the Kumbakonam taluk of Thanjavur district, Tamil Nadu. It is the birthplace of Krishnan Raman Brahmarayar who served as the Commander-in-chief of the Chola army.

== Demographics ==
As per the 2001 census, Ammangudi had a total population of 1356 with 685 males and 671 females. The sex ratio was 980. The literacy rate was 78.64.
