= Mangudi-pudukottai =

- panchayat town
- Location in Tamil Nadu, India
- Coordinates: 10.41°N 78.71°E
- Country: India
- State: Tamil Nadu
- District: Pudukkottai
- Elevation: 128 m (420 ft)

Population (2001)
  - Total: 1,574

Languages
  - Official: Tamil
- Time zone: UTC+5:30 (IST)

Mangudi is a panchayat town in Pudukkottai district in the state of Tamil Nadu, India.

== Geography ==
Annavasal is located at 10.47°N 78.7°E. It has an average elevation of 128 metres (419 feet).

== Demographics ==
As of 2001 India census, Mangudi had a population of 1574. Males constitute 47% of the population and females 54%. Annavasal has an average literacy rate of 64%, higher than the national average of 59.5%; with 55% of the males and 45% of females literate. 14% of the population is under 6 years of age.

== Schools in Mangudi ==
- Government High School

== Hospitals ==
- Government Hospital - Annavasal
- Government Hospital - mangudi
