= Ullur =

- Census town
- Location in Tamil Nadu, India
- Coordinates: 10°58′30″N 79°24′05″E
- Country: India
- State: Tamil Nadu
- District: Thanjavur

Population (2001)
  - Total: 7,779

Languages
  - Official: Tamil
- Time zone: UTC+5:30 (IST)

Ullur is a census town in Thanjavur district in the Indian state of Tamil Nadu.

== Demographics ==
As of 2001 India census, Ullur had a population of 7779. Males constitute 50% of the population and females 50%. Ullur has an average literacy rate of 80%, higher than the national average of 59.5%: male literacy is 85%, and female literacy is 75%. In Ullur, 10% of the population is under 6 years of age.
