= Perappadi =

Coordinates: 10°54′N 79°30′E

- Village
- Interactive map of Perappadi
- Country: India
- State: Tamil Nadu
- District: Thanjavur
- Taluk: Kumbakonam

Population (2011)
  - Total: 1,500

Languages
  - Official: Tamil
- Time zone: UTC+5:30 (IST)

Perappadi is a village in the Kumbakonam taluk of Thanjavur district, Tamil Nadu, India.

== Demographics ==
At the 2011 census, Perappadi had a population of 1,500 (752 males and 748 females). The sex ratio was 995. The literacy rate was 75.85%.
