= Vittalur =

Coordinates: 10°59′N 79°29′E

- village
- Interactive map of Vittalur
- Country: India
- State: Tamil Nadu
- District: Thanjavur
- Taluk: Kumbakonam

Languages
  - Official: Tamil
- Time zone: UTC+5:30 (IST)

Vittalur is a village in the Kumbakonam taluk of Thanjavur district, Tamil Nadu.

== Demographics ==
As per the 2001 census, Vittalur had a total population of 1688 with 853 males and 835 females. The sex ratio was 979. The literacy rate was 69.75.
