= Thandalam, Thanjavur =

Thandalam
- village
- Country: India
- State: Tamil Nadu
- District: Thanjavur
- Taluk: Kumbakonam

Population (2001)
  - Total: 1,444

Languages
  - Official: Tamil
- Time zone: UTC+5:30 (IST)
- PIN: 612402
- Vehicle registration: TN 68

Thandalam is a village in the Kumbakonam taluk of Thanjavur district, Tamil Nadu, India. It is in the Kumbakonam-Mannargudi arterial road.

== Demographics ==
As per the 2001 census, Thandalam had a total population of 1444 with 736 males and 708 females. The sex ratio was 962. The literacy rate was 83.03.

== Notable people ==
The current head of the Kanchi Kamakoti Peetam, Sankaracharya Sri Vijayendra Saraswathi was born in this village.
