= Nagagudi =

Nadagudi
- village
- Country: India
- State: Tamil Nadu
- District: Thiruvarur
- Taluk: Nannilam

Population (2001)
  - Total: 432

Languages
  - Official: Tamil
- Time zone: UTC+5:30 (IST)
- Postal code: 610107

Nagagudi is a village in the Nannilam taluk of Thiruvarur district, Tamil Nadu, India.

== Demographics ==
Nadagudi in Thiruvarur District in the Indian state of Tamil Nadu. It is the headquarters town for Nannilam Taluk.

The town is a main hub for the nearby villages. Many of the population are farmers. Nannilam is located 30 km west of Karaikal and 30 km east of Kumbakonam. The people mainly depend on agriculture, almost 70% of the population are employed in agriculture, Nadagudi and the surrounding area is home to many temples, including Shiva temple which is located c. Sri Maha Mariamman Temple, permual temple, ஐயனார் சுவாமி கோவில்

government school primary agriculture co-operative society
