= Kothangudi, Kumbakonam taluk =

Kothangudi
- village
- Country: India
- State: Tamil Nadu
- District: Thanjavur
- Taluk: Kumbakonam

Population (2001)
  - Total: 1,959

Languages
  - Official: Tamil
- Time zone: UTC+5:30 (IST)

Kothangudi is a village in the Kumbakonam taluk of Thanjavur district, Tamil Nadu, India.

== Demographics ==
As per the 2001 census, Kothangudi had a total population of 1959 with 990 males and 969 females. The sex ratio was 979. The literacy rate was 65.59
