= Malayappanallur =

Coordinates: 10.9458°N 79.4098°E

- village
- Interactive map of Malayappanallur
- Country: India
- State: Tamil Nadu
- District: Thanjavur
- Taluk: Kumbakonam

Population (2001)
  - Total: 1,407

Languages
  - Official: Tamil
- Time zone: UTC+5:30 (IST)

Malayappanallur is a village in the Kumbakonam taluk of Thanjavur district, Tamil Nadu, India.

== Demographics ==
As per the 2001 census, Malayappanallur had a total population of 1407 with 697 males and 710 females. The sex ratio was 1019. The literacy rate was 63.24
