= Vellamperambur =

Village in Tamil Nadu, India

- village
- Interactive map of Vellamperambur
- Coordinates: 10°50′35″N 79°03′20″E
- Country: India
- State: Tamil Nadu
- District: Thanjavur

Languages
  - Official: Tamil
- Time zone: UTC+5:30 (IST)
- Postal code: 613 101

Vellamperambur is a village in Thanjavur District, Tamil Nadu, India.
