= Ammachatram =

Ammachatram elangovan city
- village
- Interactive map of Ammachatram
- Coordinates: 10.981654°N 79.420795°E
- Country: India
- State: Tamil Nadu
- District: Thanjavur

Population (2011)
  - Total: 2,967

Languages
  - Official: Tamil
- Time zone: UTC+5:30 (IST)
- Vehicle registration: TN-

Ammachatram is a village situated 6 km from Kumbakonam (Temple Town) to Mayiladuthurai route on [State Highway (SH - 64)] and 277 km away from Chennai. The village is called Mela Ammachatram (West) and Ammachatram (East) that's centered in between UmaMaheswarapuram, Thirunageswaram(Famous for Rahu and Oppiliappan temple), Kumbakonam and Mayiladuthurai which is nearby the panchayat of Thepperumalnallur (famous for its Bhagavatha mela) and comes under Kumbakonam and Thiruvidaimarudur Taluk in Thanjavur District. Ammachatram is a village in Kumbakonam taluk, Thanjavur district, Tamil Nadu.

== Demographics ==
As per the 2011 census, Ammachatram had a population of 2967 with 1455 males and 1512 females, giving a sex ratio of 1039 compared to the state average of 996. 270 (9.1%) of the population was aged 0-6, and the literacy rate was 85.09% compared to a state average of 80.09%.

== Etymology ==
An ancient village prescribed in "Bavishyotta puranam" as "Bairavapuram" after some period it was called "Sakkuvambalpuram" or "Ammani Ammal Chatiram", presently pronounced as Ammachatiram in Tamil.
