= Keeranur, Kumbakonam =

Keeranur
- village
- Country: India
- State: Tamil Nadu
- District: Thanjavur

Population (2001)
  - Total: 1,410

Languages
  - Official: Tamil
- Time zone: UTC+5:30 (IST)

Keeranur is a village in the Kumbakonam taluk of Thanjavur district, Tamil Nadu, India.

== Demographics ==
As per the 2001 census, Keeranur had a total population of 1410 with 714 males and 696 females. The sex ratio was 975. The literacy rate was 78.61
