= Thukkatchi =

Thukkachi
- village
- Country: India
- State: Tamil Nadu
- District: Thanjavur
- Taluk: Kumbakonam

Population (2001)
  - Total: 2,190

Languages
  - Official: Tamil
- Time zone: UTC+5:30 (IST)

Thukkatchi is a village in the Kumbakonam taluk of Thanjavur district, Tamil Nadu, India.

== Demographics ==
In the 2001 census, Thukkatchi had a total population of 2190 with 1052 males and 1138 females. The sex ratio was 1082. The literacy rate was 73.23
