= Baburajapuram =

Coordinates: 10.5700°N 79.2000°E

- village
- Interactive map of Baburajapuram
- Country: India
- State: Tamil Nadu
- District: Thanjavur

Population (2001)
  - Total: 3,101

Languages
  - Official: Tamil
- Time zone: UTC+5:30 (IST)

Baburajapuram is a village in the Kumbakonam taluk of Thanjavur district, Tamil Nadu.

== Demographics ==
As per the 2001 census, Baburajapuram had a total population of 3101 with 1533 males and 1568 females. The sex ratio was 1023. The literacy rate was 75.24.
