= Sembiavarambal =

- Village
- Country: India
- State: Tamil Nadu
- District: Thanjavur
- Taluk: Kumbakonam

Population (2001)
  - Total: 1,100

Languages
  - Official: Tamil
- Time zone: UTC+5:30 (IST)

Sembiavarambal is a village in the Kumbakonam taluk of Thanjavur district, Tamil Nadu, India.

== Demographics ==
As per the 2001 census, Sembiavarambal had a total population of 1100. The sex ratio was 1.0267, with 543 males and 557 females. The literacy rate was 74.97%.
