= Injikollai =

- village
- Interactive map of Injikollai
- Coordinates: 10.875832°N 79.479239°E
- Country: India
- State: Tamil Nadu
- District: Thanjavur

Population (2001)
  - Total: 3,631

Languages
  - Official: Tamil
- Time zone: UTC+5:30 (IST)

Injikollai is a village in the Kumbakonam taluk of Thanjavur district, Tamil Nadu, India.

== Demographics ==
As per the 2001 census, Injikollai had a total population of 3631 with 1813 males and 1818 females. The sex ratio was 1003. The literacy rate was 74.28.
