= Enanallur =

Coordinates: 10°55′N 79°26′E

- village
- Interactive map of Enanallur
- Country: India
- State: Tamil Nadu
- District: Thanjavur

Population (2001)
  - Total: 2,079

Languages
  - Official: Tamil
- Time zone: UTC+5:30 (IST)

Enanallur is a village in Kumbakonam taluk, Thanjavur district, Tamil Nadu.

== Demographics ==
As per the 2001 census, Enanallur had a population of 2079 with 1068 males and 1011 females. The sex ratio was 947 and the literacy rate, 69.19.
