= Vilangudi, Thanjavur =

Vilangudi
- village
- Interactive map of Vilangudi
- Coordinates: 10°56′54″N 79°29′58″E
- Country: India
- State: Tamil Nadu
- District: Thanjavur
- Taluk: Thiruvaiyaru

Population (2001)
  - Total: 1,210

Languages
  - Official: Tamil
- Time zone: UTC+5:30 (IST)
- PIN: 613204

Vilangudi is a village in the Kumbakonam taluk of Thanjavur district, Tamil Nadu, India. It is nearly 10 km from Aduthurai.

== Demographics ==
As per the 2001 census, Vilangudi had a total population of 1210 with 611 males and 599 females. The sex ratio was 980. The literacy rate was 68.81
