= Maharajapuram =

Maharajapuram is an evergreen village panchayat located in Srivilliputhur block in the Virudhunagar district of Tamil Nadu, India. With a net area of about 2,194.22 hectares, it has a population of 8,278 scattered over 2,596 households. The literacy rate is 55.17% and about 76% of the net scheduled tribe population of the block resides at the village.
