= Agarathur =

- village
- Location in Tamil Nadu, India Agarathur (India)
- Coordinates: 11°0′24″N 79°24′2″E
- Country: India
- State: Tamil Nadu
- District: Thanjavur

Languages
  - Official: Tamil
- Time zone: UTC+5:30 (IST)

Agarathur is a village in the Kumbakonam taluk of Thanjavur district, Tamil Nadu.

Agarthur is a village near Kumbakonam. It is in Thanjavur district. It is an agriculture village. It has the famous Mahasakthi Mariyamman temple in South Street of Agarathur. The village's people are mostly agriculture workers and engineers. The village has four streets and 700 people. The area of the village is acres. Two types of people there are Padaiyachi and Parayar. The village temples are Mariyamman, Murugan, Pillaiyar, Muniswarar, Ayyanar, Pidariamman, Sivan and Perumal. It has two pools called Kilakolam and Melakolam in Tamil. Temple ceremonies happen once yearly. It is a famous temple ceremony for the surrounding 10 villages. Ceremony types are palkudam, kaavadi, annathanam, sedalthiruvila, maavilakku, arichandhiranadakam. Amman roam four streets 8 days and nights, and the last day and full night they roam with some kacheri like kuravan kurathi, dhenampettai thappu, etc.
