= Athiyur =

- Village
- Location in Athiyur Tamil Nadu, India Athiyur (India)
- Coordinates: 11°2′49″N 79°22′51″E
- Country: India
- State: Tamil Nadu
- District: Thanjavur
- Region: Chozha Dynasty

Government
  - Panchayat President: Jeya Seela A

Population (2011)
  - Total: 2,630

Languages
  - Official: Tamil
- Time zone: UTC+5:30 (IST)
- PIN: 612503
- Telephone code: 0435
- Vehicle registration: TN68
- Website: http://athiyurvillage.blogspot.com/

Athiyur is a village in the Kumbakonam taluk of Thanjavur district, Tamil Nadu India. It is located 44 km north of the district headquarters in Thanjavur. Agriculture is the basis of the economy. Almost every job and/or occupation is in some way or another agriculturally related.

== Geography ==
Athiyur is located 44 km north of the district headquarters in Thanjavur, 11 km from Kumbakonam, and 284 km from the state capital, Chennai. Anoor, Kurugoor, Anna Nagar are the sub-villages. Uthamathani (1 km away), Devanancheri (2 km away), Kallur (3 km away), Neerathanallur (3 km away), and Thirunallur (3 km away) are the neighboring villages. Athiyur is surrounded by Thiruppanandal Taluk and Tiruvidaimarudur Taluk towards the east, and Kumbakonam Taluk and Valangaiman Taluk towards the south. Athiyur is connected to Kumbakonam, and Solapuram by road. The Manniyaru River provides water to be used in the irrigation of the agricultural crops produced in the area.

== Population ==
As per the 2001 census, Athiyur had a total population of 2274 with 1150 males and 1124 females. The literacy rate was 56.73%. Recently in the 2011 census, Athiyur had a total population of 2630 and the literacy rate was 72.99%. In comparison to the 2001 census, the literacy rate and population have increased. Athiyur is a village panchayat consisting of three villages named Athiyur, Aanoor and Kurugoor. It comes under Kumbakonam legislative assembly constituency and Mayiladuthurai parliamentary constituency.

== Agriculture ==
The village people's revenue is dependent on the agriculture. The River Manniyaru provides the water for the agriculture and motor (pump set) is also available. The major crops cultivated in Athiyur are paddy, pulses, gingelly, groundnut and sugarcane. The minor crops like maize, soybeans, and redgram are also grown. Paddy is the principal crop grown in three seasons, namely kuruvai, samba and thaladi. Pulses like blackgram, greengram and cash crops like cotton and gingelly are grown in rice fallows. The most plentiful crops that people harvest are paddy (rice), gram, grain, sugar cane, wheat, sesame, vegetables, cotton, casuarina trees (savukku), fruits, chilly, banana trees, gingelly, groundnut, and pulses.

== Climate ==
The period from November to February in Athiyur is pleasant with a climate full of warm days and cool nights. The onset of summer is from March, with the mercury reaching its peak by the end of May and June. The average temperatures range from 81 °F (27 °C) in January to 97 °F (36 °C) in May and June. Summer rains are sparse and the first monsoon i.e., the South-West monsoon, sets in June and continues until September. North-East monsoon sets in October and continues until January. The rainfall during South-West monsoon period is much lower than that of North-East monsoon. North-East monsoon is beneficial to the village at large because of the heavy rainfall. The average rainfall is 37 inches (940 mm), most of which is contributed by the North-East moon.

== Education ==
The Panjayat Union Primary School provides the education in Athiyur and sub villages. Athiyur Panjayat Union has three schools but the head is Athiyur Panjayat Union Primary School and the other schools are controlled by Athiyur School. The higher secondary schools are in Devanancheri, Kadichampadi, and Kumbakonam.

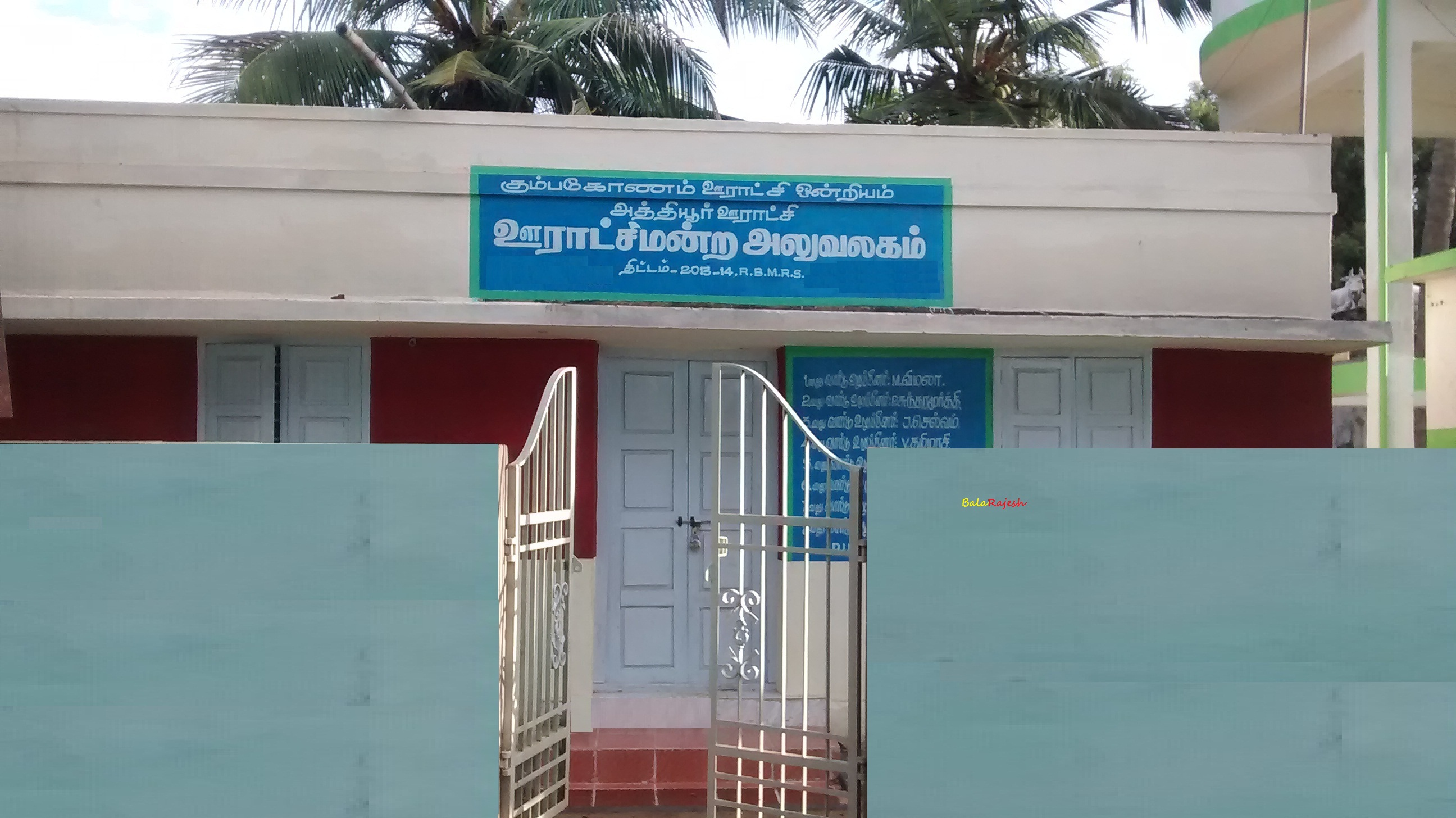
Athiyur Panjayat Board

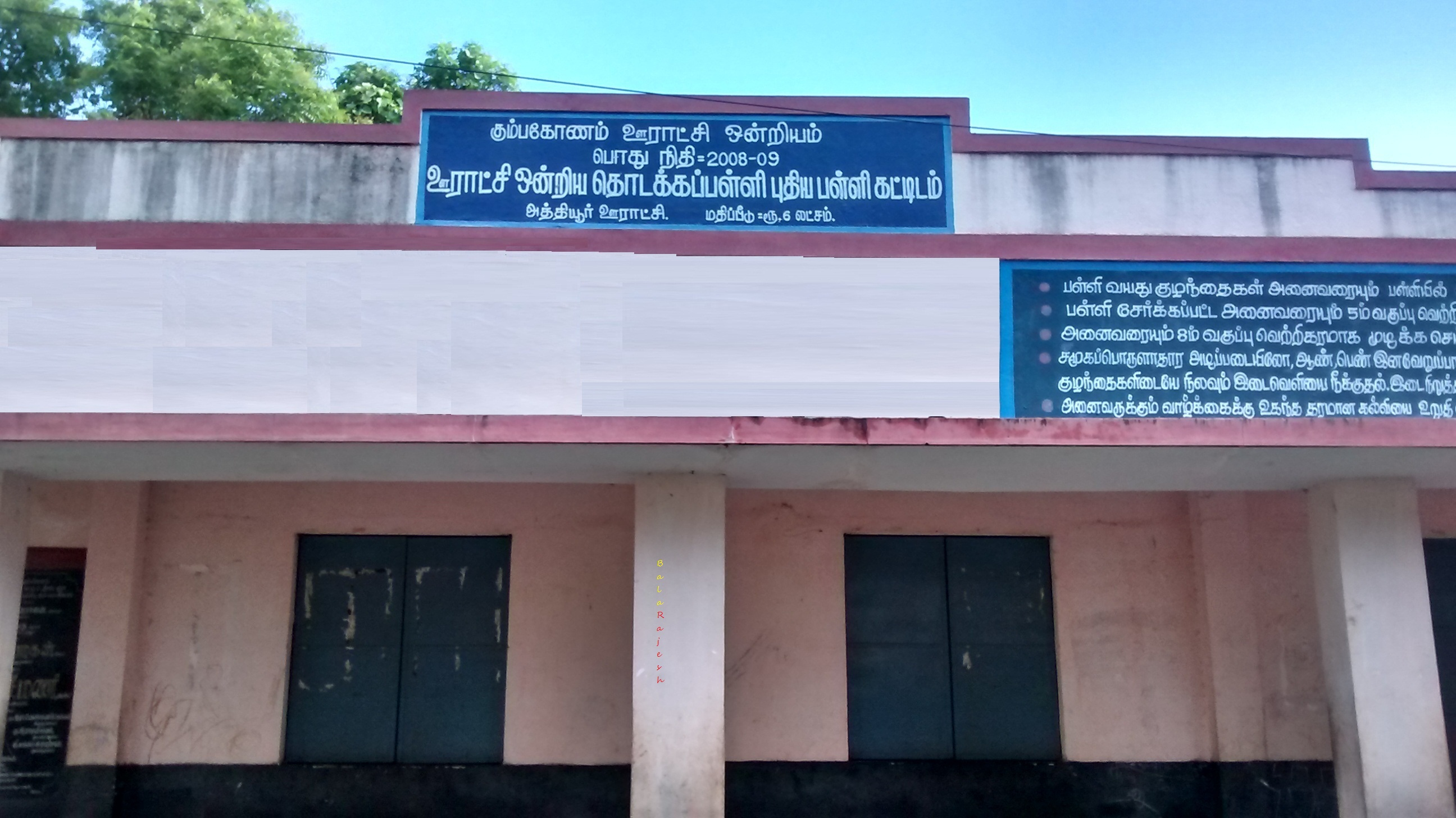
Athiyur School

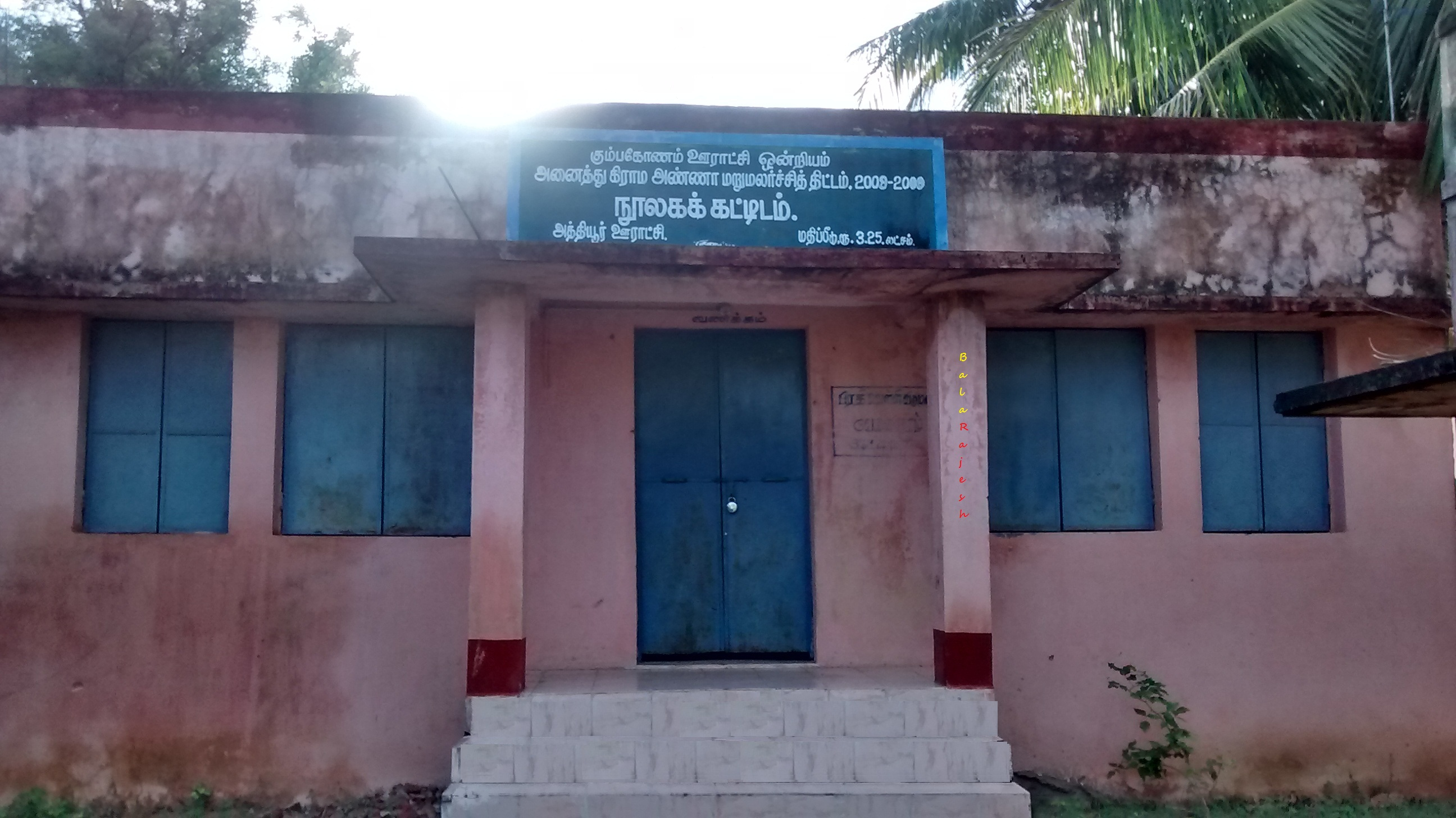
Athiyur Library

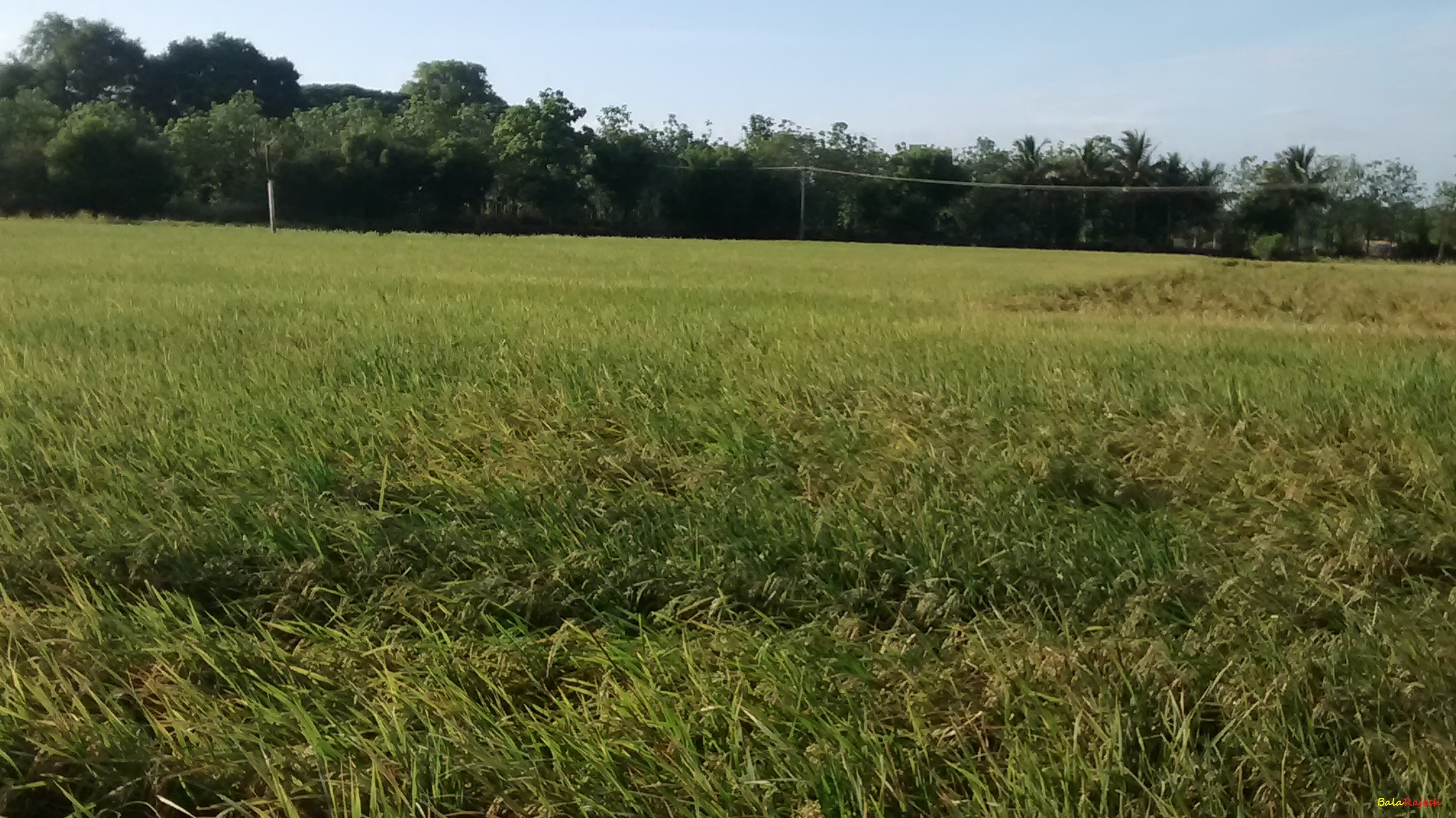
Agriculture land

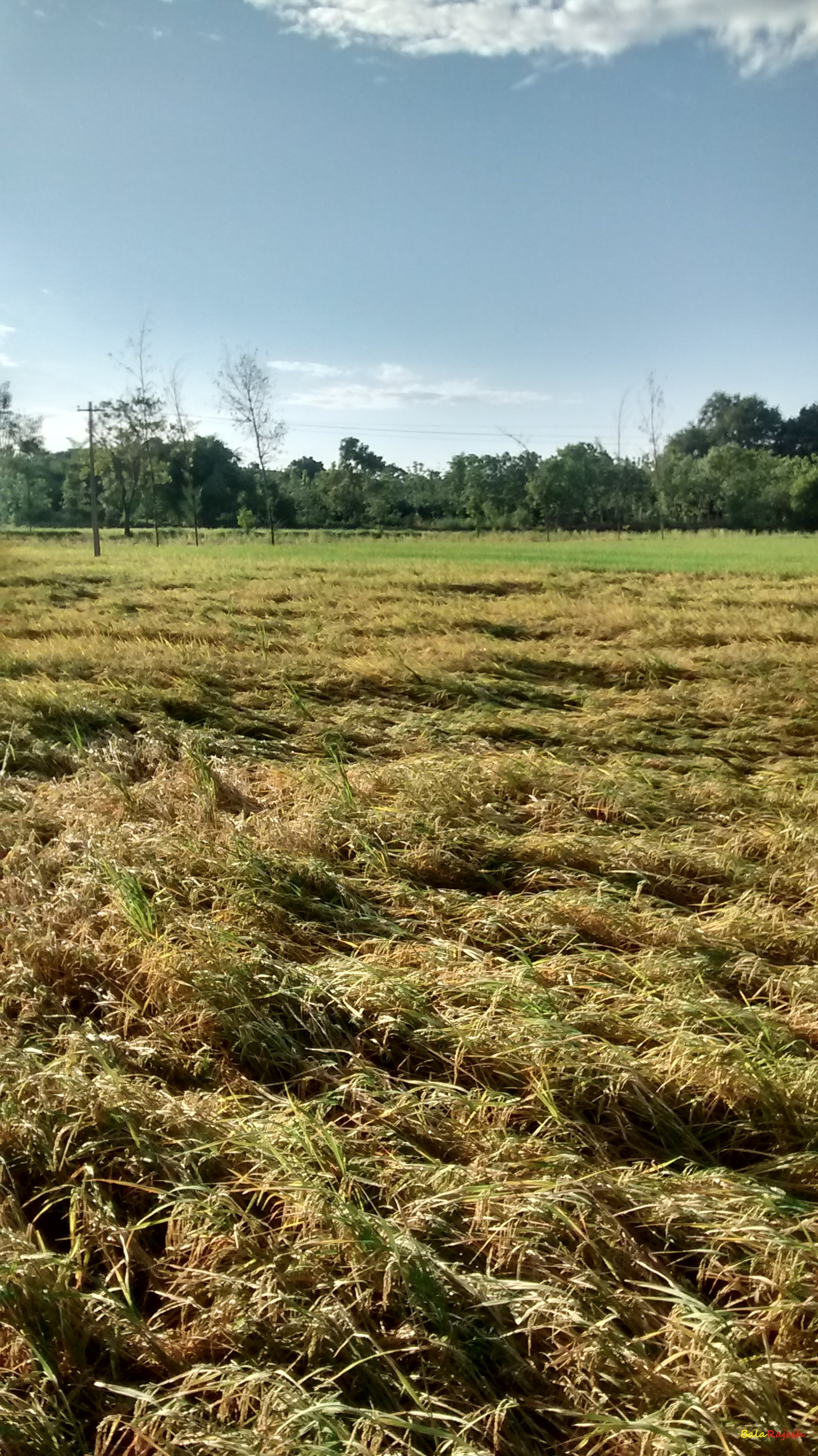
Agriculture land

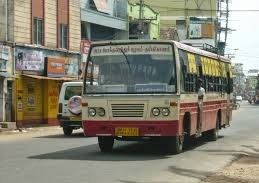
Bus at Athiyur

== Temples ==
The Vinayagar, Sivan, Amman, Munishwaran, and Ayyanar temples are famous. Each year festivals are held in the temples.

Hindu Festivals:

- Special Pongal Festivals (3 days)
- Tamil New Year
- Aadi 18 (Perukku)
- Thai Pusam

== Transportation ==
The Kumbakonam railway station is the nearest railway to Athiyur. However, the Thanjavar railway station is the only major railway station in the area. The Thanjavar railway station is located 44 km away from Athiyur. The main bus terminal is in Kumbakonam, and provides for inner and outer area transportation. There are airports located in Thanjavur and Trichy.
