= Kumbakonam Taluk =

Coordinates: 10.97°N 79.42°E

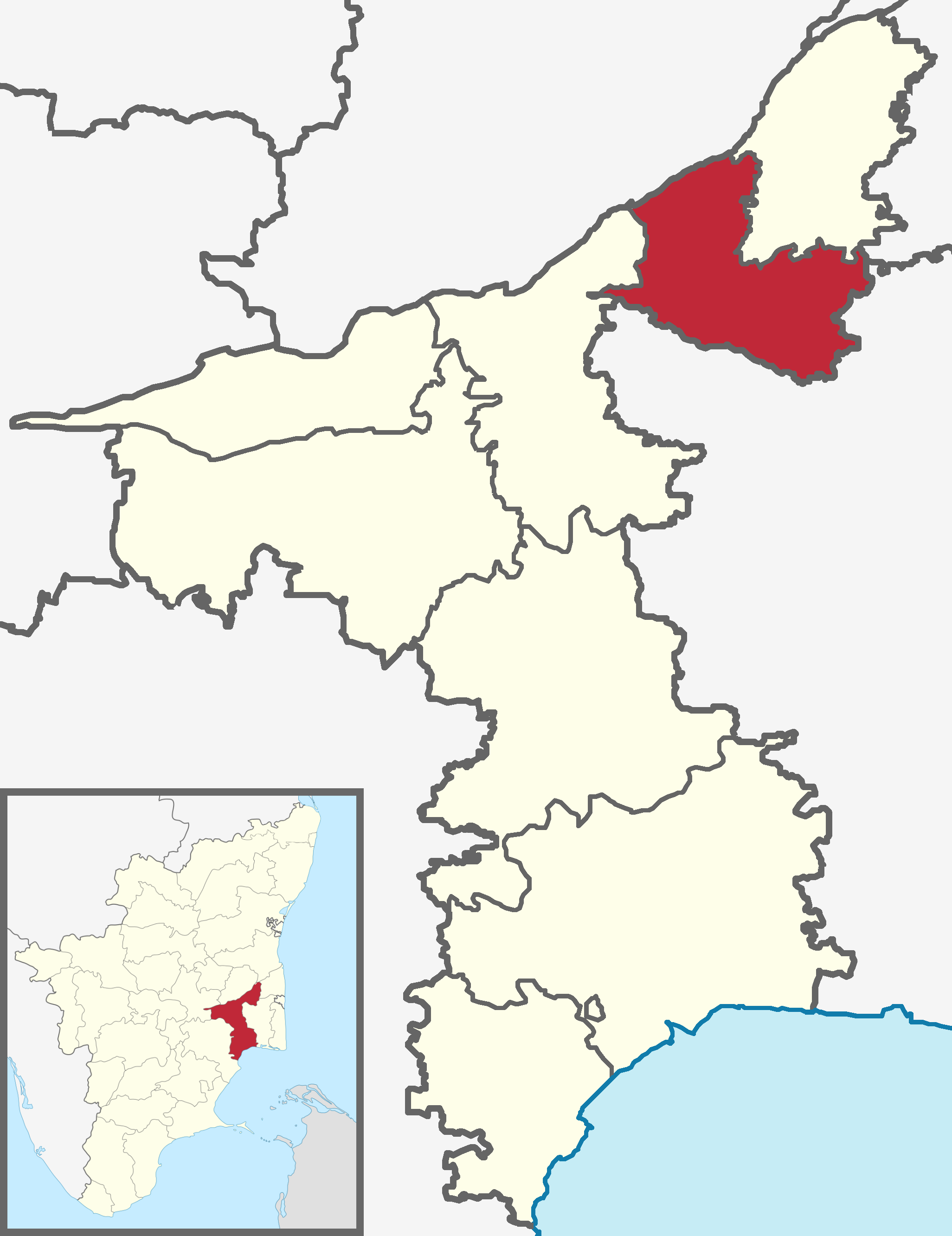
Location of Kumbakonam taluk in Thanjavur district

Kumbakonam taluk is a taluk of Thanjavur district of the Indian state of Tamil Nadu. The headquarters of the taluk is the city of Kumbakonam.

== Demographics ==
According to the 2011 census, the taluk of Kumbakonam had a population of 435,962 with 216,186 males and 219,776 females. There were 1017 women for every 1000 men. The taluk had a literacy rate of 78.05. Child population in the age group below 6 was 20,558 Males and 19,889 Females.

== Villages ==
- Ammangudi
- Ammathottam
- Inam Asur
- Injikollai
- Irandankattalai
- Katchukattu
- Keelakorukkai
- Keeranur
- Kothangudithattimal
- Kumaramangalam
- Madhavapuram
- Malayappanallur
- Marutadi
- Mathi
- Melakorukkai
- Muppakoil
- Palaiyanallur
- Pangal
- Perappadi
- Poundarigapuram
- Sembiavarambal
- Sholamaligai
- Thandanthottam
- Thenampadugai Thattimal
- Thimmakudi
- Thirumaignanam
- Thirunariyur
- Thukkatchi
- Vaniyakarambai
- Villiyavarambal
- Vittalur

patteeswaram

Chozhanmaligai Harichandrapuram Keezhapazhayar Udaiyalur Aariyapadaur Selvarajapuram Thenampadugai Muzhayur Korkai Nathankoil Thennur Ariyathidal Sivapuram Puthur Pambapadaiyur
