= Thiruppanandal block =

The Thiruppanandal block is a revenue block in the Thiruvidaimarudur taluk of the Thanjavur district in Tamil Nadu, India. It has a total of 44 panchayat villages.

== List of Panchayat villages ==
SI.No	Panchayat Village
1	Mattiyur
2	Anaikarai
3	Aralur
4	Athippakkam
5	Chidambaranathapuram
6	Irumoolai
7	Kadiramangalam
8	Kanjanur
9	Kannarakudi
10	Karuppur
11	Kattanagaram
12	Kavanur
13	Keelasooriyamoolai
14	Kilamandur
15	Koilramapuram
16	Kondasamudram
17	Koothanur
18	Kottur
19	Kulasekaranallur
10	Kurichi
21	Maharajapuram
22	Malakattur
23	Manalur
24	Manikudi
25	Marathurai
26	Melasooriyamoolai
27	Mullangudi
28	Mullukudi
29	Narikudi
30	Neikuppai
31	Neivasal
32	Pandanallur
33	Sarabhojirajapuram
34	Serugudi
35	Thirukudikaval
36	Thirulogi
37	Thirumandurai
38	Thirumangaicheri
39	Thiruvalliangudi
40	Thittacheri
41	Thugili
43	Ukkarai
44	Veerakkan
45	Velur
46	Sikkalnayakkanpett
