= Akshayanathasamy Temple, Tirumanthurai =

Temple in Tamil Nadu, India

Akshayanathasamy Temple is a Hindu temple dedicated to the deity Shiva, located at Tirumanthurai in Thanjavur district, Tamil Nadu, India.

== Vaippu Sthalam ==
According to Periya Puranam, this is one of the shrines of the Vaippu Sthalams sung by Tamil Saivite Nayanar Sambandar. This place is also known as Manthurai. In Tamil Nadu there are two places in the name of Manthurai. They are known as Vadakarai Manthurai and Thenkarai Manthurai. Vadakarai Manthurai, on the banks of Cauvery, is located at Trichy-Lalgudi, is the 58th Paadal Petra Sthalam known as Maanturai Amravaneswarar Temple. Thenkarai Manthurai is located at near Suriyanarkoil in Aduthurai-Thiruppanandal route in the Kumbakonam-Mayiladuthurai road. This is Thenkarai Manthurai.

== Presiding deity ==
The presiding deity in the garbhagriha, represented by the lingam, is known as Akshayanathasamy. The Goddess is known as Yoganayaki.

== Specialities ==
As Chandra participated in the Daksha yajna, he had to face the wrath of Shiva. He was affected by some disease and in order to get cured he asked the advice of his guru. As per his advice Chandra came to this place and worshipped the deity. Then the disease was cured. Kalamaa Muni and Navagraha during their halt at Suriyanar Koil worshipped the presiding deity of this temple. Till date devotees after worshipping Akshayanathasamy, goes to Suryanar Koil. In this temple there is a well. During Valarpirai (waxing moon) the water level increases and during Theypirai (waning moon) the water level decreases. During Amavasya, in December 2018, the water from the well started to come out, when large number of devotees saw them with surprise.

== Structure ==
The temple has a gopura. In the prakara shrines of Vinayaka, Subramania, Gajalakshmi and Venugopala Perumal are found. There is also Nataraja shrine. Bhairava, Surya and Somasundara are also found. The shrine of Somasundara is found in the left side. Temple tank is found near the temple. In the kosta, Dakshinamurti, Nartana Vinayaka, and Lingodbhava are found. Vinayaka is found with his consort. Shrine of Sambandar, Appar, Sundarar and Manikkavacakar is also found.

== Location ==
The temple is located in Kumbakonam-Mayiladuthurai road, next to Thirubhuvanam, Thiruvidaimarudur and Aduthurai. Through Aduthurai, in left, after reaching Thirumangalakudi and Suryanar Kovil, in the right a road leads to Manalur. Through Poompuhar-Kallanai road also this place can be reached. One time puja is held in the temple.
