= Serugudi =

- village
- Location in Tamil Nadu, India Serugudi (India)
- Coordinates: 10.98°N 79.47°E
- Country: India
- State: Tamil Nadu
- District: Thanjavur
- Taluk: Thiruvidaimarudur

Government
  - Body: Serugudi Village Panchayat

Population (2001)
  - Total: 1,118

Languages
  - Official: Tamil
- Time zone: UTC+5:30 (IST)
- Nearest city: Tiruchirapalli
- Sex ratio: 951 ♂/♀
- Lok Sabha constituency: Mayiladuthurai
- Vidhan Sabha constituency: Thiruvidaimarudur
- Civic agency: Serugudi Village Panchayat

Serugudi is a village in the Thiruvidaimarudur taluk of Thanjavur district, Tamil Nadu, India. It is situated between Thiruppanandal and Pandanallur. The nearest bus stop is at Kakithapattarai.

According to the 2001 census, it had a population of 2,094 with 1070 men and 1024 women. During British rule, the village was a part of Shiyali taluk of Tanjore District. The village is famous for its Ayyanar temple, Virupaksheeswarar Temple and Shitala Amman temple.

== History ==
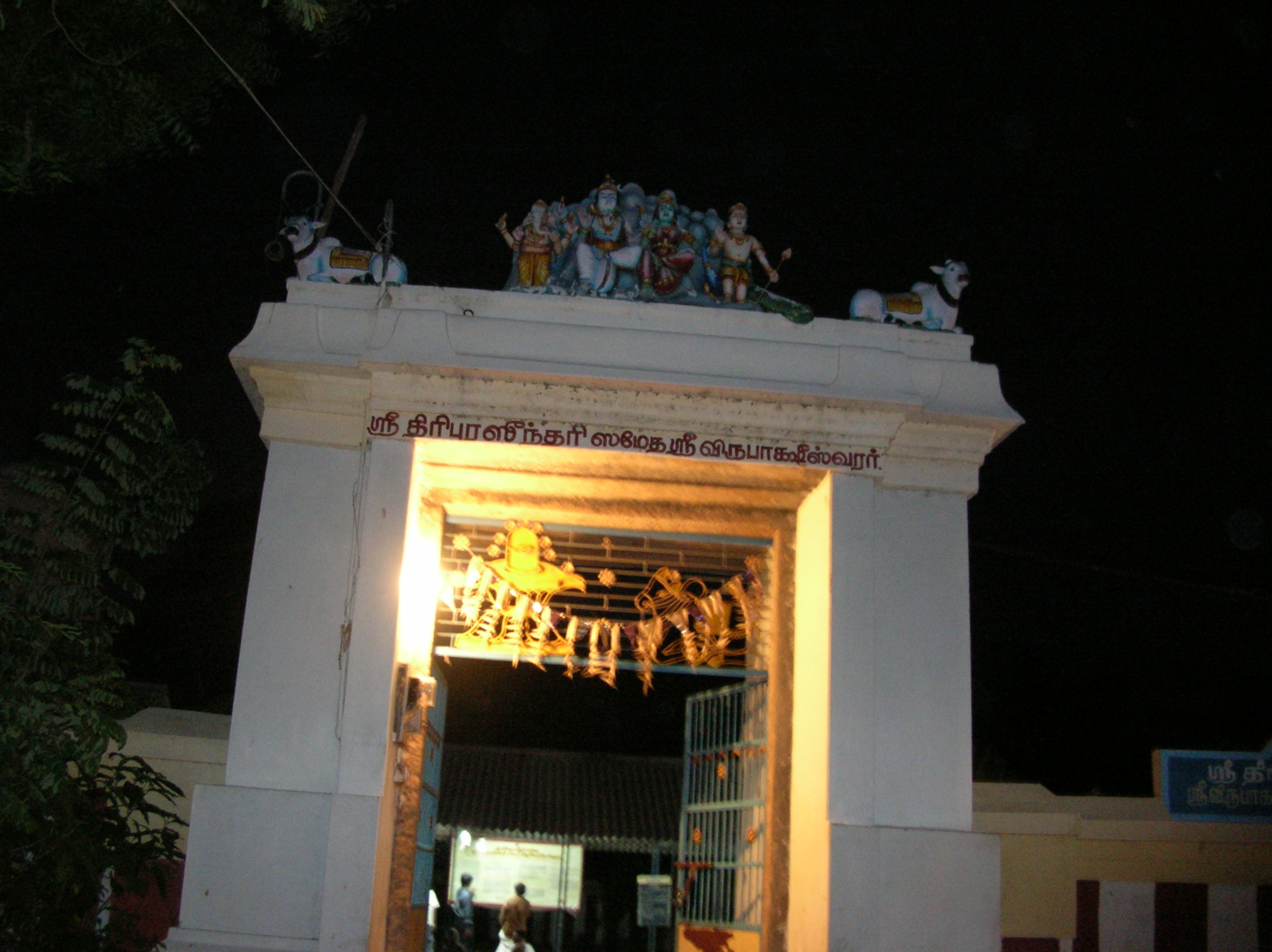
The Virupaksheeswarar Temple at Serugudi

Serugudi was established by Kulothunga Chola I as a brahmadeya under the name "Solakulavalli chaturvedimangalam" at the behest of his queen Solakulavalli. Kulothunga Chola I invited Brahmins from conquered lands to settle in the village and gave large gifts of land to them. The Virupaksheeswarar temple at Serugudi was constructed by Rajaraja Chola II in about 1160 AD. A 12th century inscription found on a wall adjoining the Dakshinamoorthi shrine in the temple complex records the grant and mentions the name of the village as "Thannaru" and the name of the deity as "Thannarudaya Nayanar". The stone and mortar temple was built upon an older brick shrine centred on a vilva tree. Rajaraja Chola II is also credited with the founding of a nearby shrine dedicated to Sithala Devi. Serugudi was also alternatively known as "Virupakshipuram".

The Virupaksheeswarar Temple was renovated and consecrated by Chandrashekarendra Saraswati, the Shankaracharya of Kanchi matha in 1949.

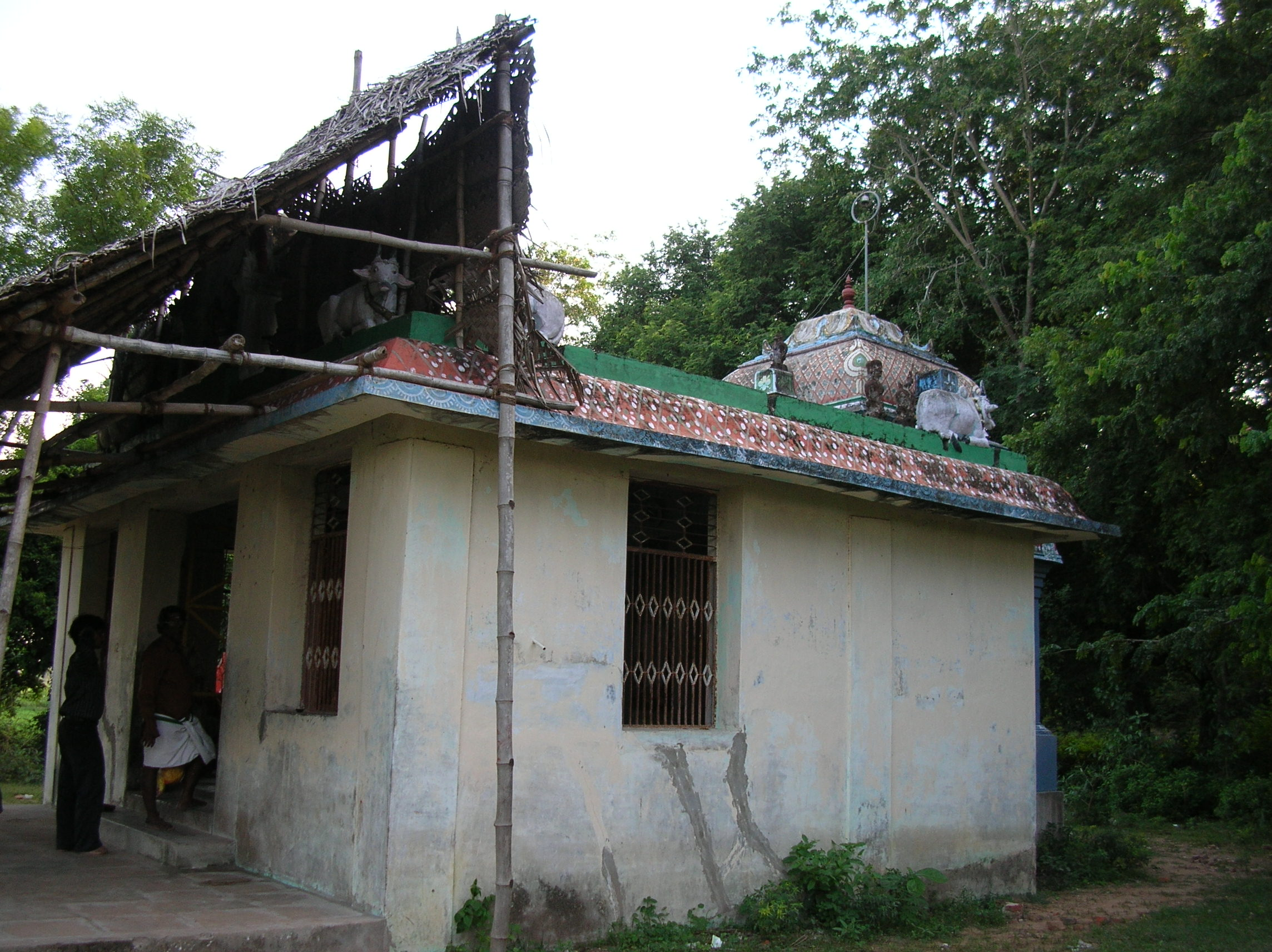
Ayyanar temple in Serugudi
