= Pandanallur =

Suburban in Tamil Nadu, India

Coordinates: 11°08′N 79°31′E

- Village
- Interactive map of Pandanallur
- Country: India
- State: Tamil Nadu
- District: Thanjavur
- Taluk: Thiruvidaimarudur

Languages
  - Official: Tamil
- Time zone: UTC+5:30 (IST)

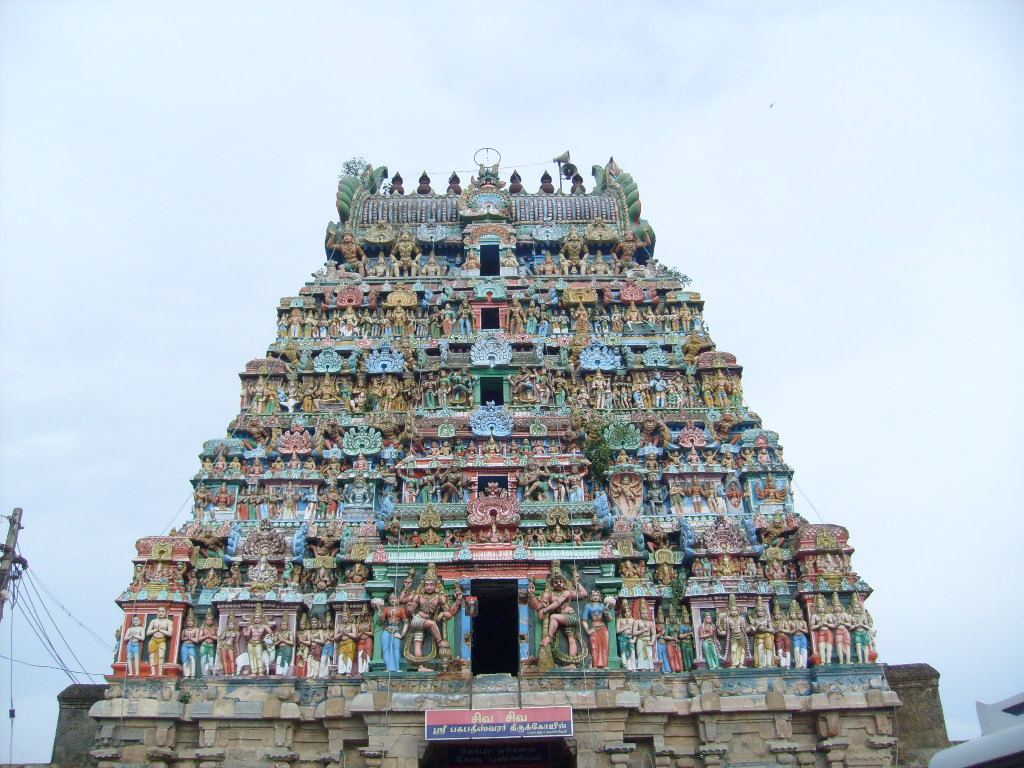
The entrance to the Pasupatiswarar Temple

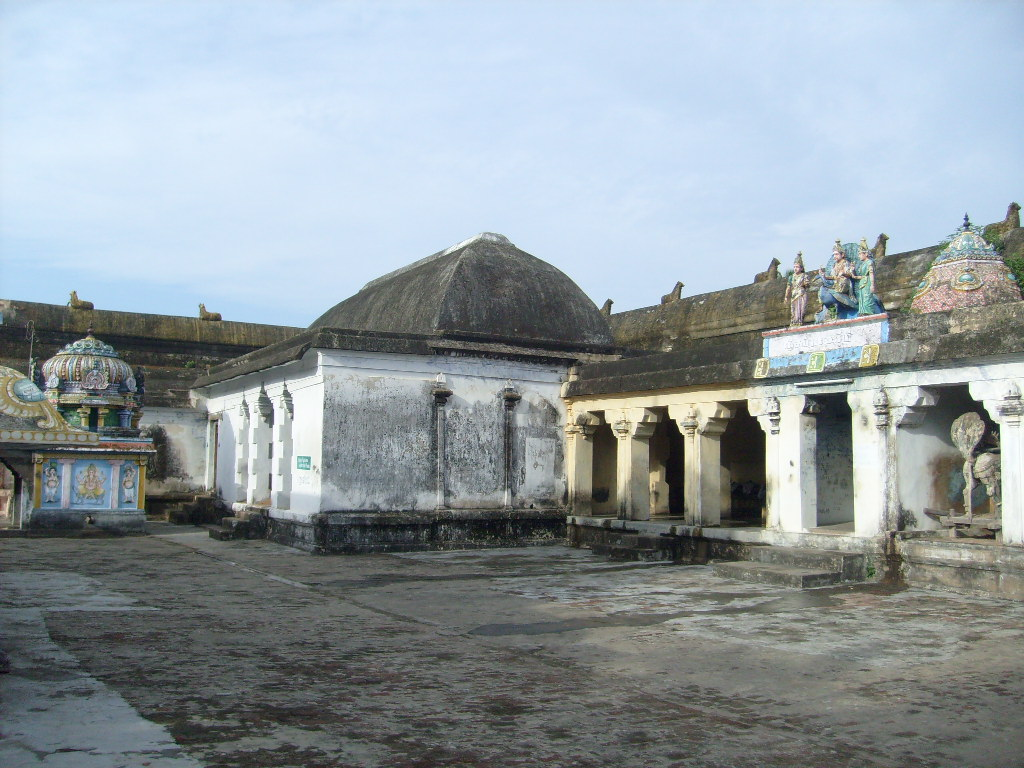
The interiors of the Pasupatiswarar Temple

Pandanallur is an Indian village located in the Thiruvidaimarudur taluk of Thanjavur district, Tamil Nadu. It is north of the town of Aduthurai, not far from the city of Mayiladuthurai. Pandanallur is a culturally significant place, known for its Pasupatiswarar Temple and Adikesava Perumal temple. The Pandanallur style of Bharatanatyam also traces its origin to Pandanallur.

== Demographics ==
The Pandanallur village has population of 4680 of which 2370 are males while 2310 are females with total of 1146 families residing. Average Sex Ratio of Pandanallur village is 975 which is lower than Tamil Nadu state average of 996. Child Sex Ratio for the Pandanallur as per census is 917, lower than Tamil Nadu average of 943. The children(0-6) form 10.32% of total population. Pandanallur village has lower literacy rate compared to Tamil Nadu. In 2011, literacy rate of Pandanallur village was 79.49% compared to 80.09% of Tamil Nadu. In Pandanallur Male literacy stands at 84.56% while female literacy rate was 74.31%.

== Transport ==
Pandanallur is located at the distance of 290 km (180 mi) from Chennai, 29 km (18 mi) from Kumbakonam, 20 km (12 mi) from Mayiladuthurai and 34 km (21 mi) from Sirkazhi,10 km (6.2 mi) from Thiruppanandal,15 km (9.3 mi) from Aduthurai,10 km (6.2 mi) from Kuttalam,10 km (6.2 mi) from Anaikarai,13 km (8.1 mi)from Manalmedu.

== See also ==
- Thiruppanandal
- Manalmedu
- Serukadambur
- Anaikkarai

== Sources ==
- "Map of revenue villages in Thiruvidaimarudur taluk". Government of Tamil Nadu. Archived from the original on 27 September 2011.
