= Sundaresvarar Temple, Durvasapuram =

Shiva temple in Tamil Nadu, India

Sundaresvarar Temple is a Siva temple in Durvasapuram in Pudukkottai district in Tamil Nadu, India.

== Location ==
This temple is located on the Tirumayam-Madurai road, at a distance of 10 kilometres from Tirumayam.

After the war in Sri Lanka, Rama returned to Ayodhya. Durvasar along with other rishis returned. At that time, on his way he worshipped the deity of this temple. So, this place was known as Durvasapuram.

== Presiding deity ==
The presiding deity is known as Sundaresvarar. The goddess is known as Bagam Piriyal. Kala Bhairava is found in a separate shrine. As special importance is given to him in this temple, it is also known as Bhairava Temple. The arthi which was shown to Bhairava is not given to devotees. Likewise the offerings, especially the food, which were given to the presiding deity and the goddess is not given to the devotees. Vilva is the temple tree. Bhairava tirtta is the temple tank.

== Structure ==
The entrance is found in a different style. In the front mandapa, Sanisvara, Surya, Chandra, Saptamatas and Karuppasamy are found. In the kosta of the presiding deity Dakshinamurthi is found. The Muyalaga is found facing left.

== Festivals ==
In order to kill the two asuras Sambasuran and Padmasuran, Bhairava came from the third eye of Shiva. As he destroyed them during the Tamil month of Karthikai, a festival known as Samba Sashti festival is held in a grand manner. During the Tamil month of Aani 10 day festival is held. During Panguni Thiriyambakashtami festival is held.

== Worshipping time ==
The temple is opened for worship from 6.00 to 12.00 noon and 4.00 to 8.30 p.m. Pujas are held four times daily at Kalasanthi (9.30 a.m.), Uttchikkalam (noon 12.00), Sayaratchai (6.30 p.m.) and Arthajamam (8.00 p.m.).
