= Tirur (disambiguation) =

Tirur is a city in Kerala, India. It may also refer to:

- Tirur Taluk, a Taluka in Kerala
- Tirur (State Assembly constituency), a constituency in Kerala
- Tirur railway station, a railway station in Kerala
- Tirur Village, a village panchayat in Tamil Nadu, India
- Tirur, Iran, a city in Minab County, Hormozgan province
