= Airavateswarar Temple, Maruthuvakudi =

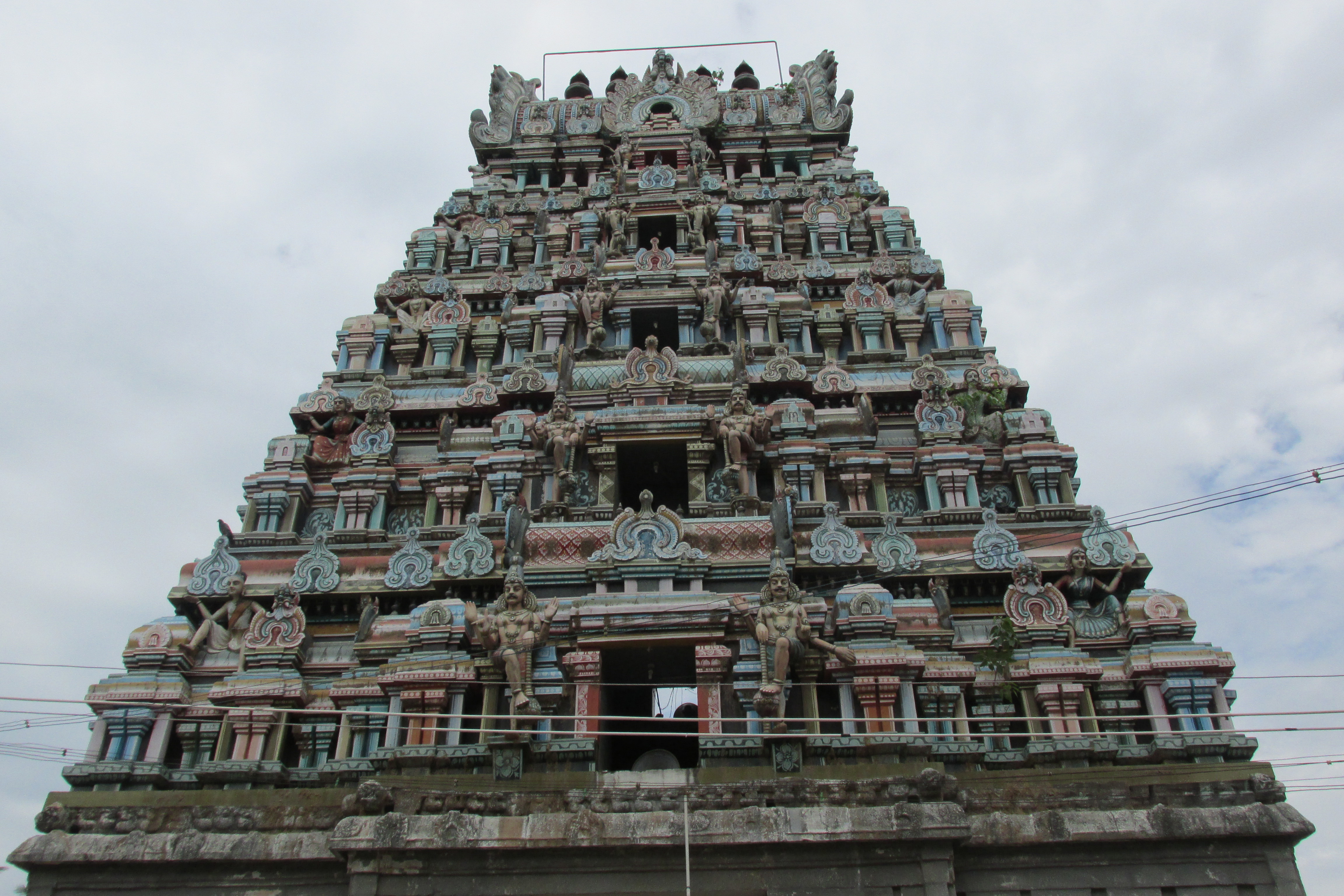
Koil Gopuram

Airavateswarar Temple (also known as Viruchiga Rasi Sthalam Sri Abirami Sameda Iravadeaswarar Temple) is a Hindu temple located at Maruthuvakudi near Aduthurai in the Thanjavur district of Tamil Nadu, India.

== Legend ==
Indra, the god-king of Heaven, and his white elephant Airavata were cursed by Sage Durvasa for throwing a garland given to them by the god Brahma. Indra lost his Kingdom and Airavata turned black. Indra worshipped the god Shiva here and was eventually released from the curse. It is also the place where Shiva slew the demon Marutthuvasura, from which the name of the village originated from.

== Deities ==
The presiding deity is known as Airavateswarar. His consort is known as Abirami. The lingam icon of Shiva is said to be made of white clay and was not sculpted by man but self menifested (swayambhu). The stone image of Nandi faces the Shiva, and is located slightly away from its original position. It is named Baana Nandi and looks pored on its surface. It is believed the Nandi was injured with Maruthuvasura's arrows and protected his master Shiva. Besides Shiva, his consort, the goddess Parvati as Abirami Amman worshipped here. In addition to the famous Thirukkadaiyur temple of the goddess, there are five temples dedicated to her. Shiva's son, Ganesha, called "Viruchika Vinayagar" (who has a trunk resembling Virchika-Scorpion) is worshipped. He is believed to be able to heal poisonous insect bites of those who worship him. Shiva's other son Murugan is worshipped with his consorts.

== Vaippu Sthalam ==
It is one of the shrines of the Vaippu Sthalams sung by Tamil Saivite Nayanar Appar.

== Architecture ==
The temple was constructed from bricks and stone. It is built with Dravidian architecture in the Chola style. The Gopuram is six stories high. It was said to be built during the reign of the Chola queen Sembiyan Mahadevi, which is attested by some stone carvings at the temple. The temple was ruined then restored. The "Kumbabhishekam" (consecretion ceremony) of this temple recently took place on 31 August 2006. This Kumbabishekam was performed at this temple after 200 years.

== Nearby landmark ==
The famous Tamil Nadu Rice Research Institute is located beside the temple is one of the landmark.

== Photogallery ==
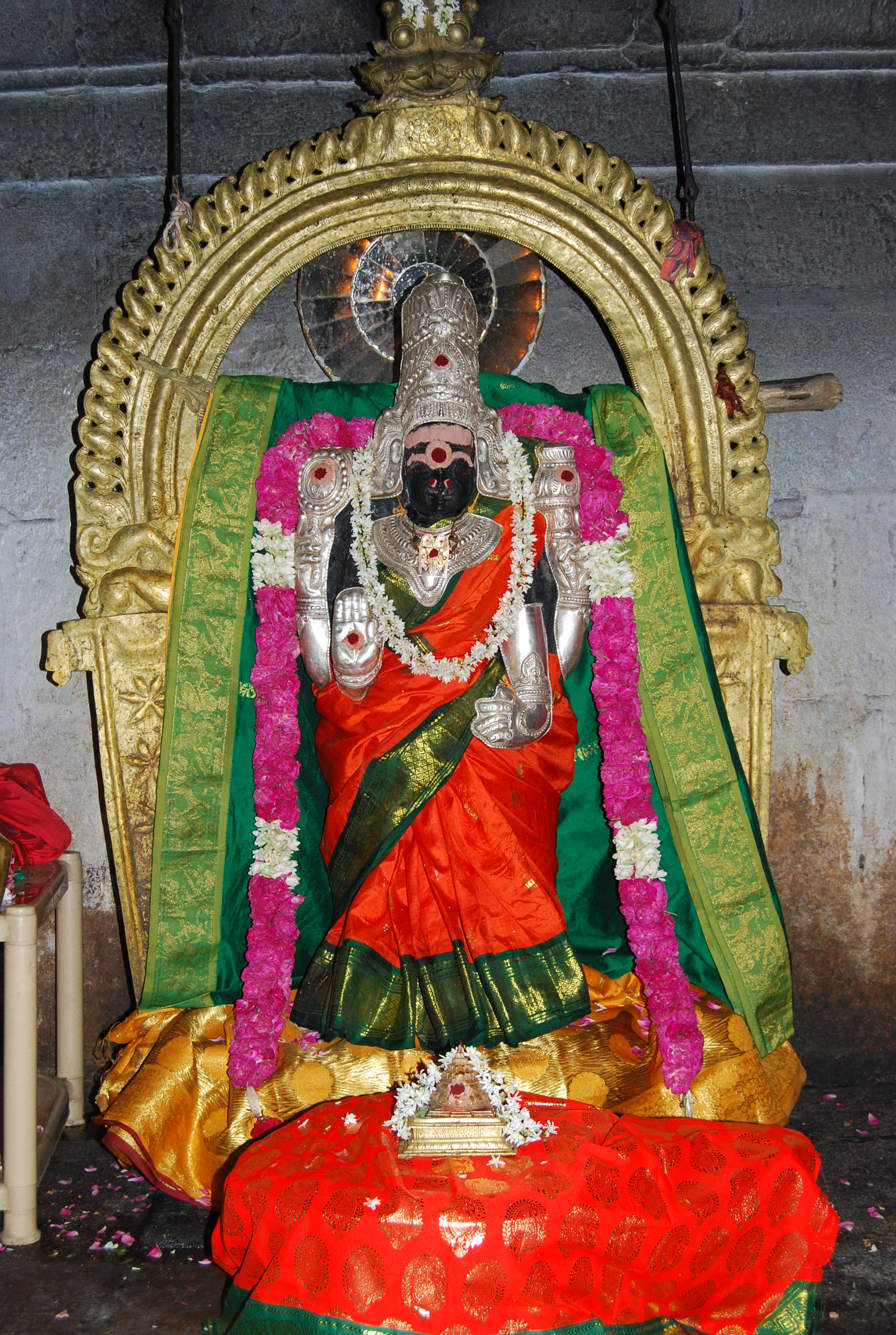
Goddess Abirami Amman

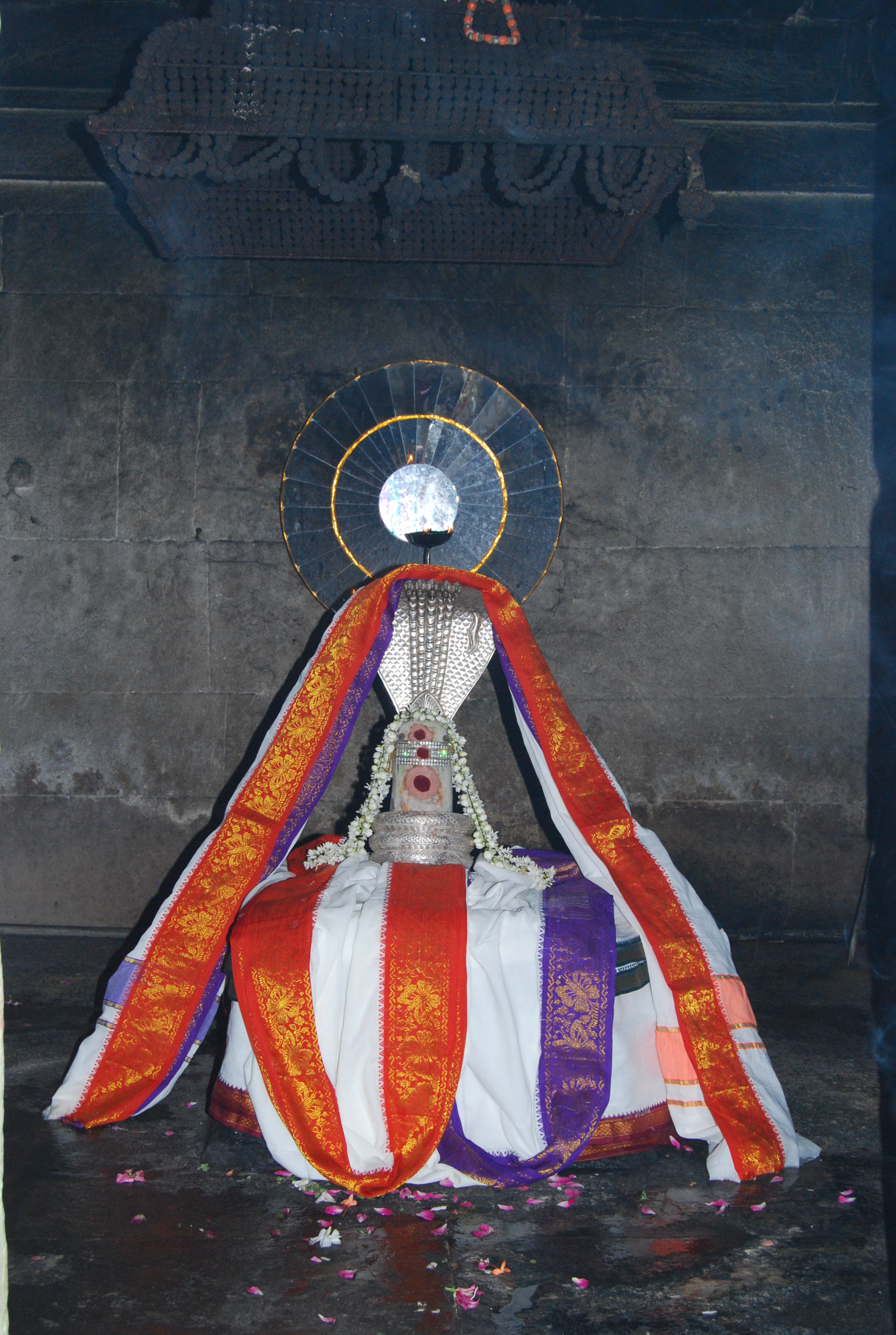
Shiva

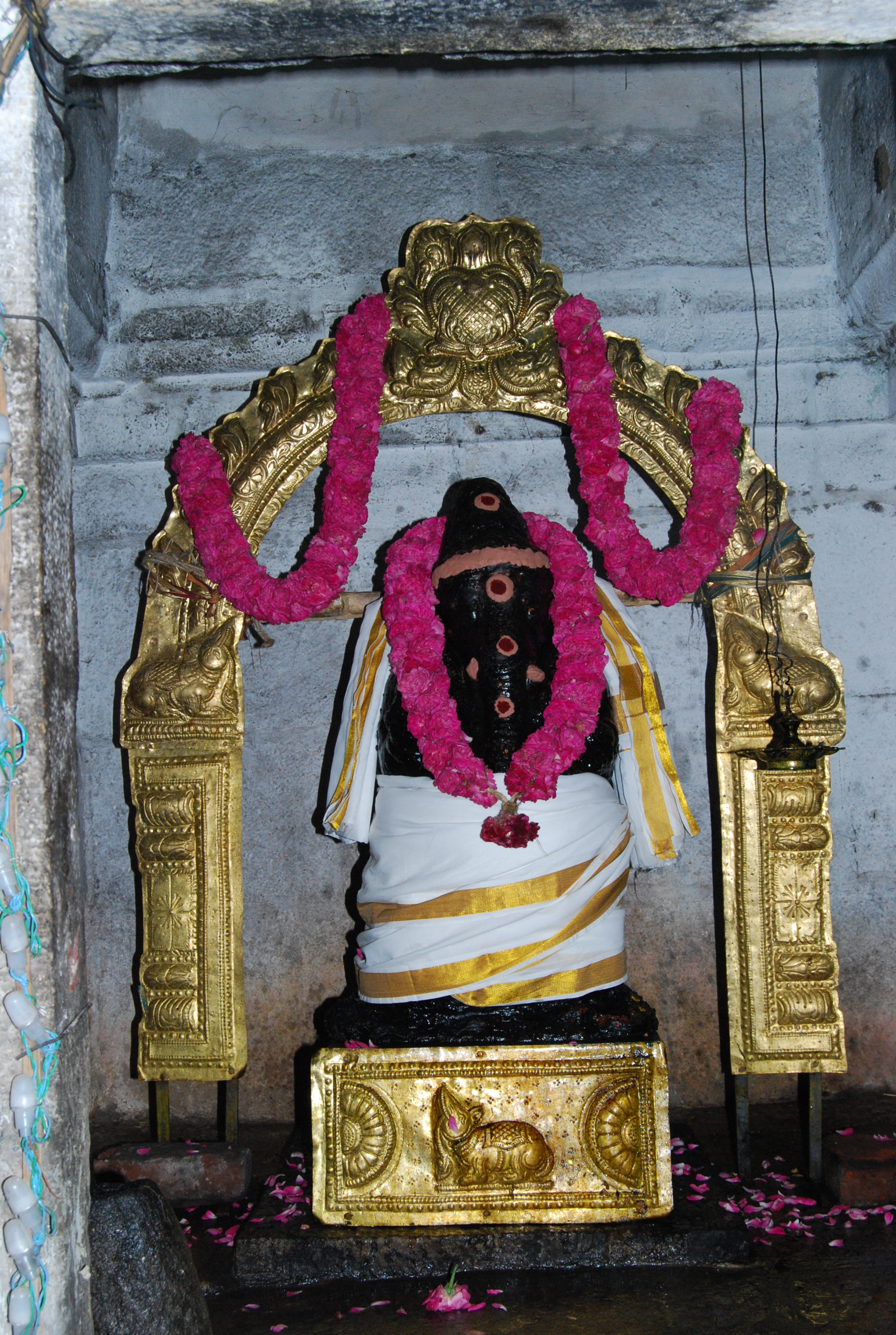
Ganesha

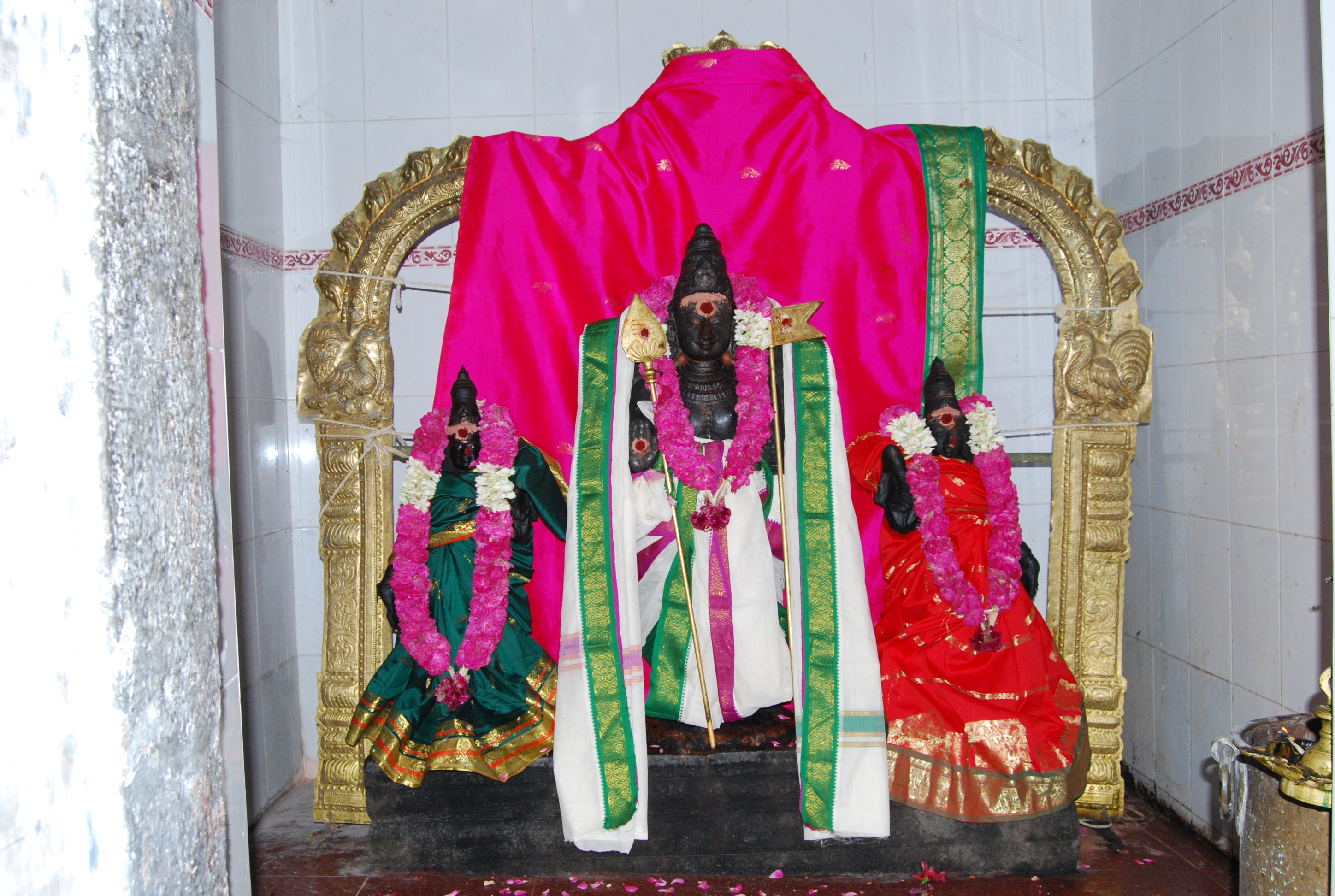
Murugan

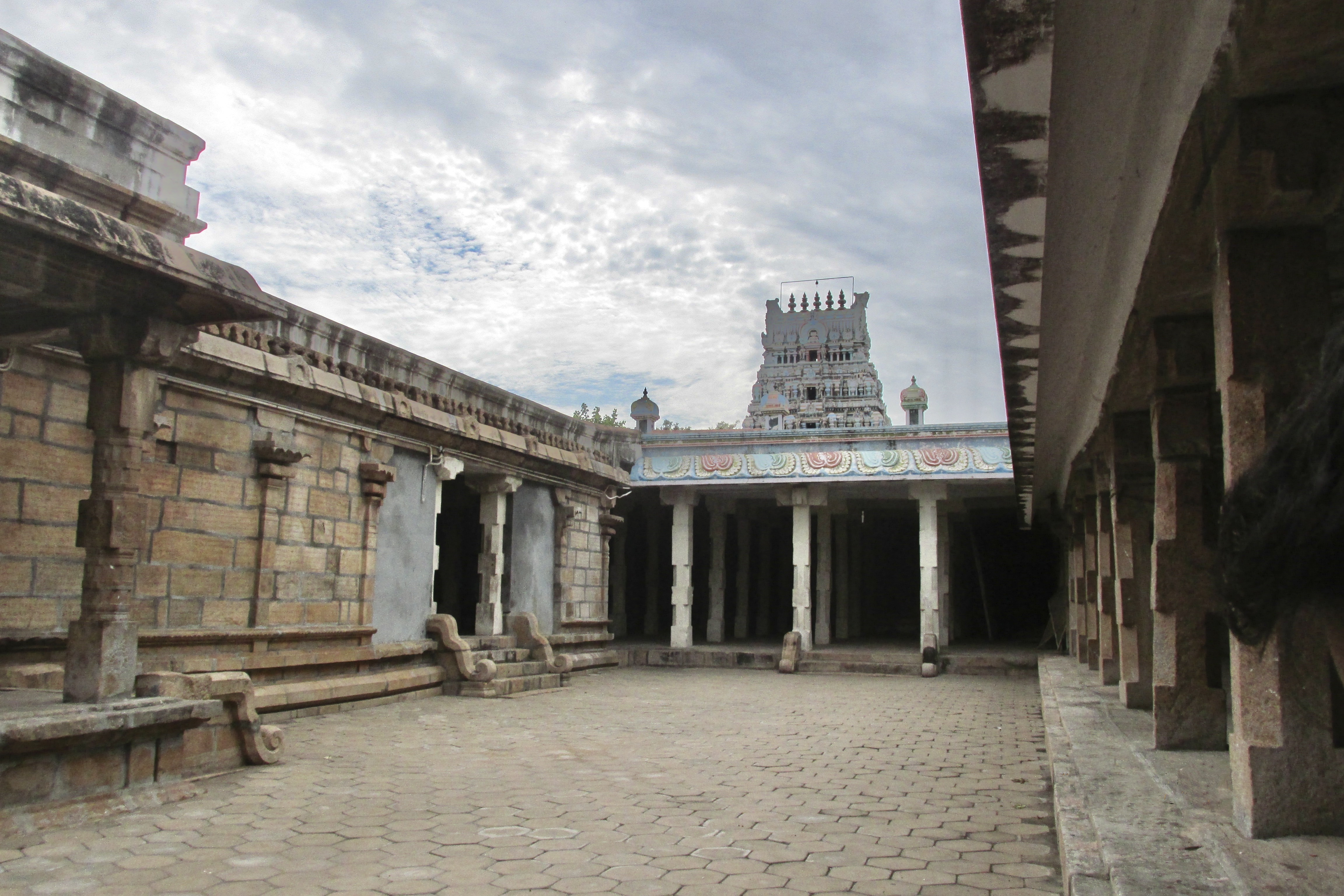
Temple premises
