= Pasupatiswarar Temple =

Shiva temple in Thanjavur district, Tamil Nadu, India

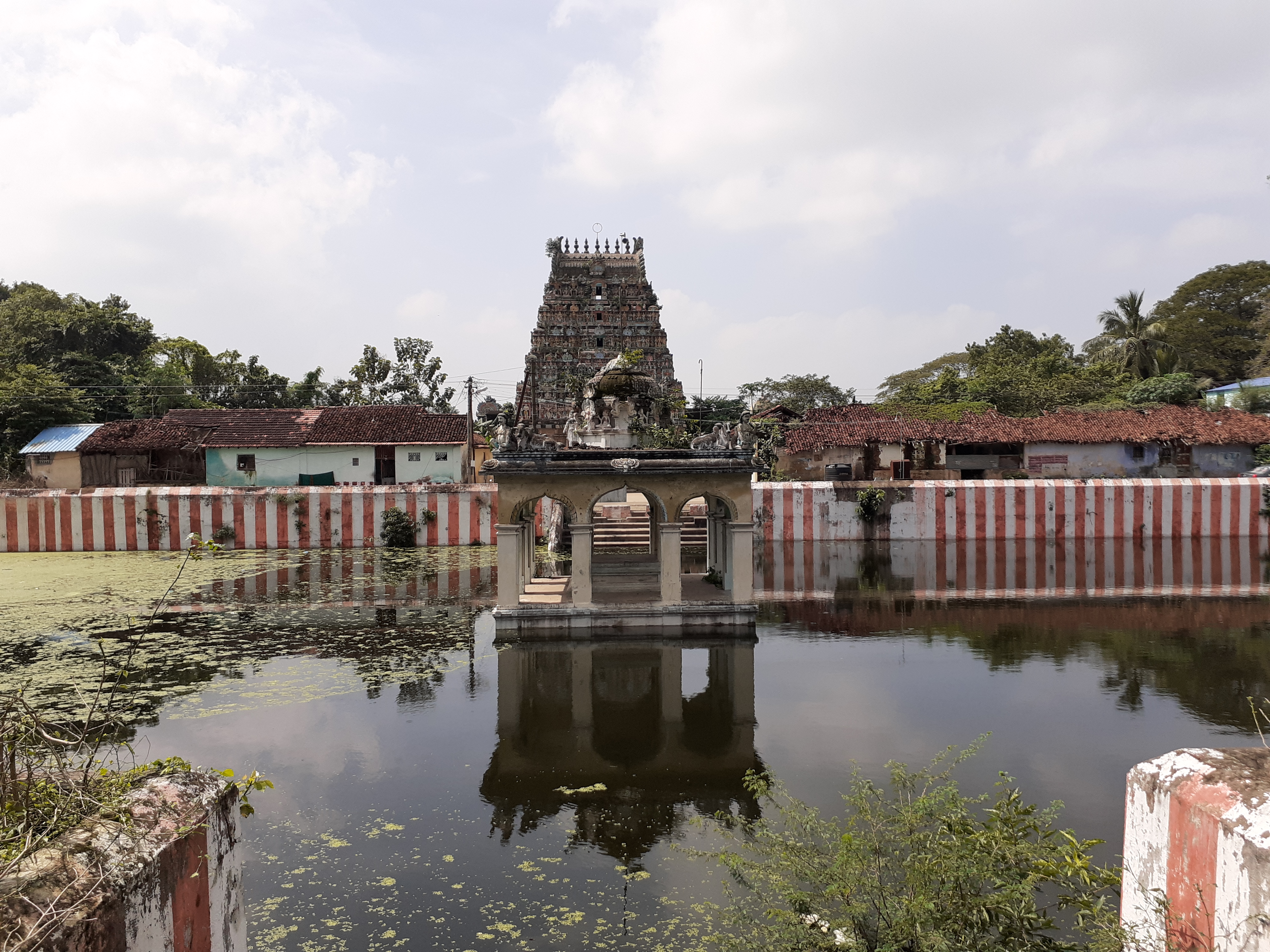

- Location in Tamil Nadu

Religion
- Affiliation: Hinduism
- District: Thanjavur
- Deity: Pasupatiswarar(Shiva)

Location
- Location: Tamil Nadu, India
- State: Tamil Nadu
- Country: India
- Coordinates: 11°7′N 79°31′E

Architecture
- Type: Dravidian architecture

Pasupatiswarar Temple is located in Pandanallur in the Thiruvidaimarudur taluk of Thanjavur district in the South Indian state of Tamil Nadu. Shiva is worshiped as Pasupatheeswarar, and is represented by the lingam and his consort Parvati is depicted as Mangalambika. The presiding deity is revered in the 7th century Tamil Saiva canonical work, the Tevaram, written by Tamil poet saints known as the nayanars and classified as Paadal Petra Sthalam.

This temple is associated with Parvathi playing with a ball, giving the name Pandanainallur to the village and subsequently worshipped the presiding deity in the form of a cow, giving the name Pasupatheeswarar to the presiding deity. There are many inscriptions associated with the temple indicating contributions from Cholas. The oldest parts of the present masonry structure were built during the Chola dynasty during the 11th century, while later expansions, are attributed to later periods.

The temple houses a three-tiered gateway tower known as gopuram. The temple is now maintained and administered by Hindu Religious and Charitable Endowments Department of the Government of Tamil Nadu.

== History ==
There are multiple inscriptions in the temple from the Cholas from the 10th century. The earliest inscription is recorded from the time of Rajaraja I. There are inscriptions from the subsequent kings like Vikrama Chola (1118–35), Rajadhiraja II (1166–1178), Kulothunga III (1178–1218) and Rajaraja III (1216–1256). There are inscriptions indicating donations to the temple from the Vijayanagar Empire. The inscriptions refer the presiding deity as Pasupathy Devan and Pasupatheeswarar, while the village is mentioned as Pandanainallur and Vadanattu Vilathurnattu Pandanallur. In modern times, the temple is maintained and administered by the Hindu Religious and Charitable Endowments Department of the Government of Tamil Nadu. The temple has dance traditions specialising in Bharatanatyam.

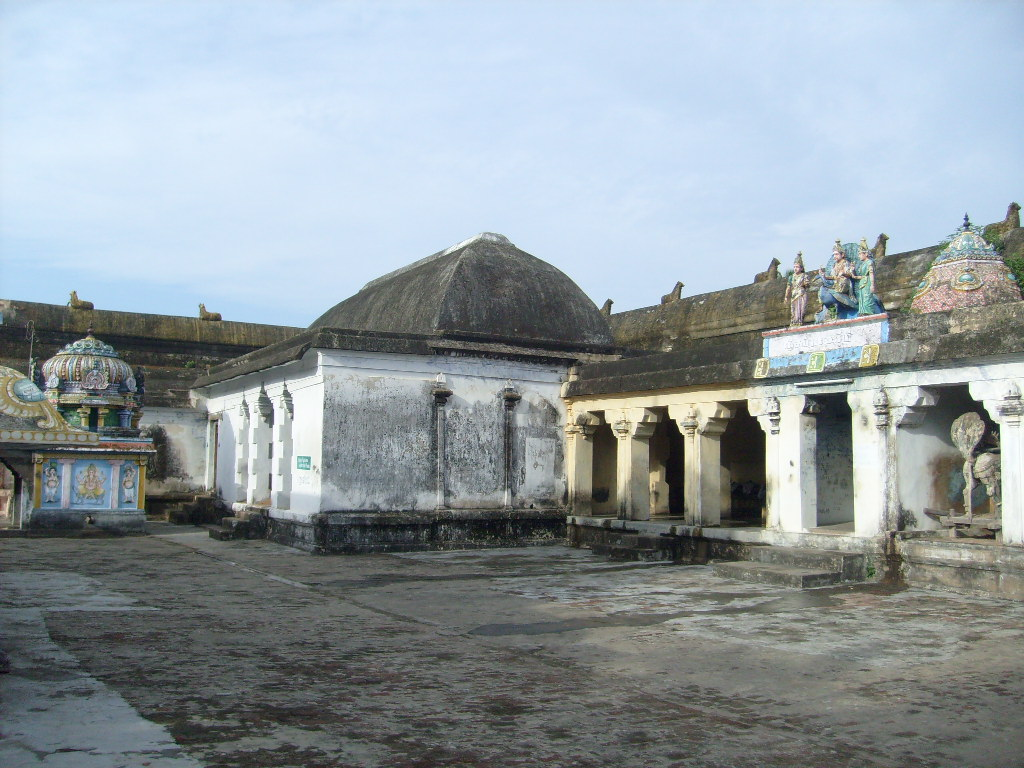
The interiors of the Pasupatiswarar Temple

The temple is mentioned in the verses of Tevaram, the 7th century Saivite canonical work. As the temple is in Tevaram, it is classified as Paadal Petra Sthalam, one of the 275 temples that find mention in the Saiva canon.
