= Prananadeswarar Temple =

Shiva temple in Mayiladuthurai district, Tamil Nadu, India

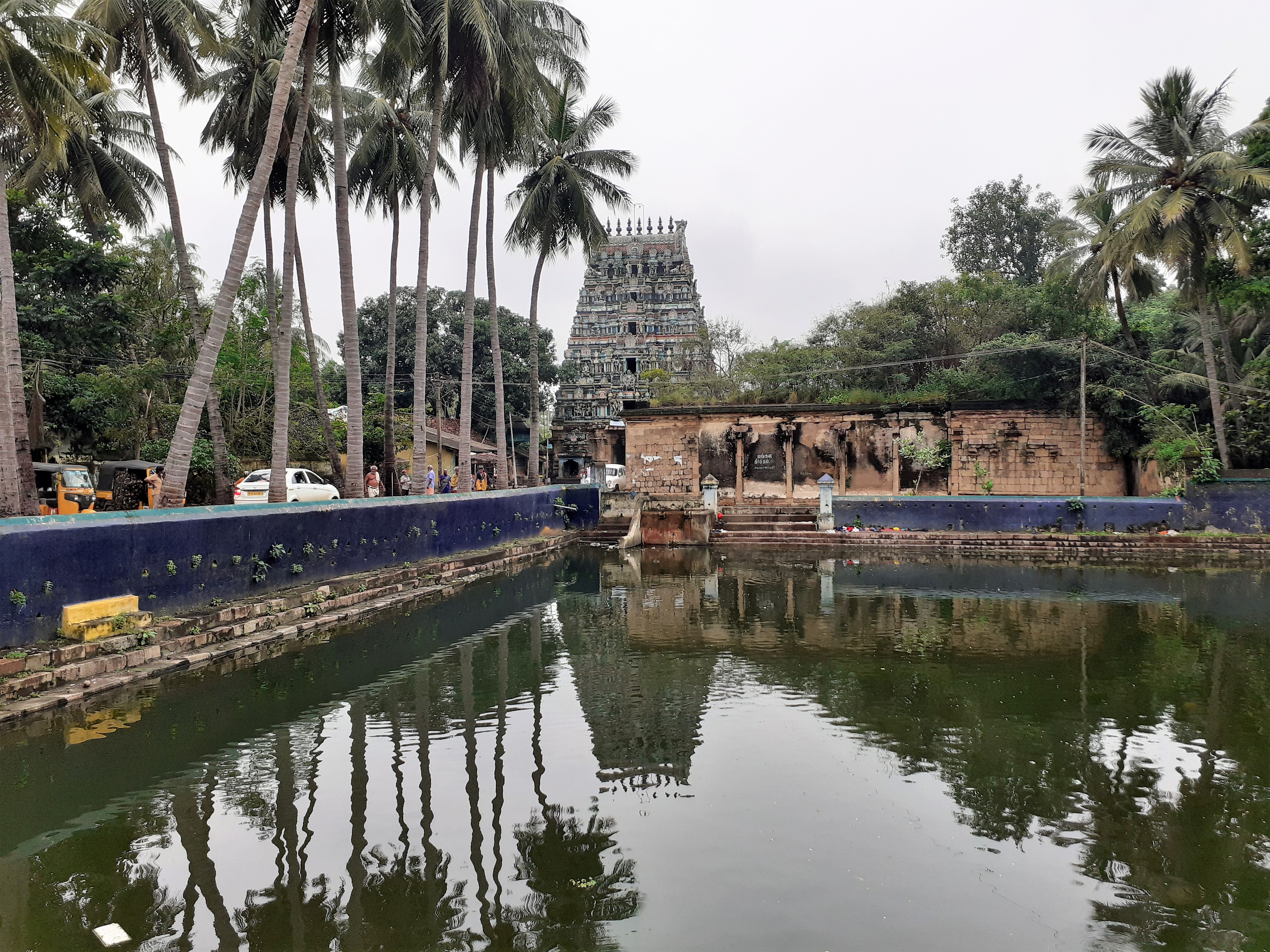

- Location in Tamil Nadu

Religion
- Affiliation: Hinduism
- District: Tanjore
- Deity: Prananadeswarar(Shiva) Mangalambigai(Parvathi)

Location
- Location: Thirumangalakudi, Kumbakonam, Tamil Nadu, India
- State: Tamil Nadu
- Country: India
- Coordinates: 11°1′27″N 79°28′14″E

Architecture
- Type: Dravidian architecture

Prananadeswarar Temple is a Hindu temple dedicated to Shiva located in Thirumangalakudi in Thanjavur District of Tamil Nadu, India. Shiva is worshiped as Prananatheswarar, and is represented by the lingam and his consort Parvati is depicted as Mangala Nayagi. The presiding deity is revered in the 7th century Tamil Saiva canonical work, the Tevaram, written by Tamil poet saints known as the nayanars and classified as Paadal Petra Sthalam.

There are many inscriptions associated with the temple indicating contributions from Cholas, Thanjavur Nayaks and Thanjavur Maratha kingdom. The oldest parts of the present masonry structure were built during the Chola dynasty in the 9th century, while later expansions, are attributed to later periods, up to the Thanjavur Nayaks during the 16th century.

The temple house a five-tiered gateway tower known as gopurams. The temple has numerous shrines, with those of Mangalapureeswarar and Mangalanayagi being the most prominent. The temple is mentioned by Tevaram hymns

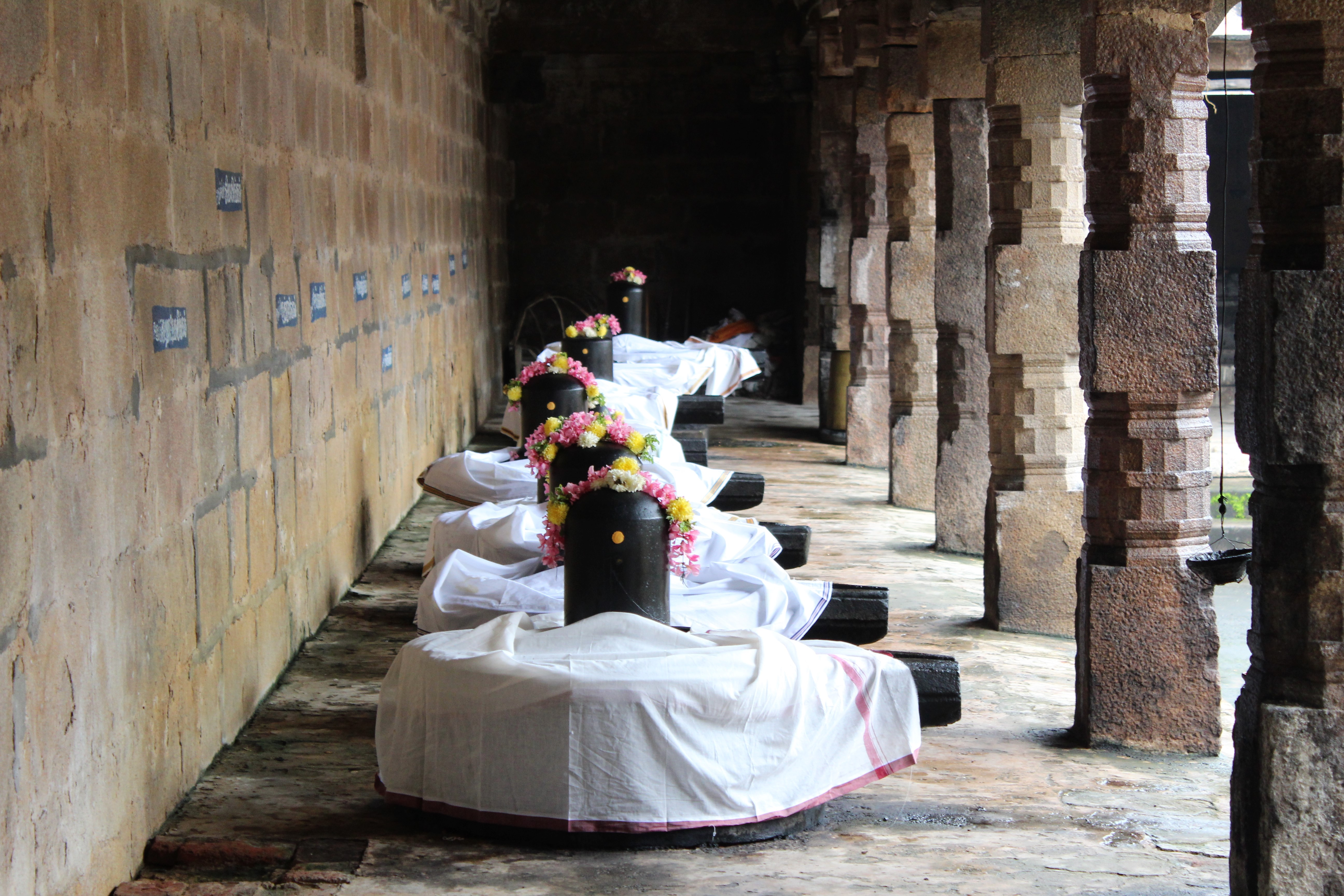
Set of Lingas in the precinct

== Architecture ==
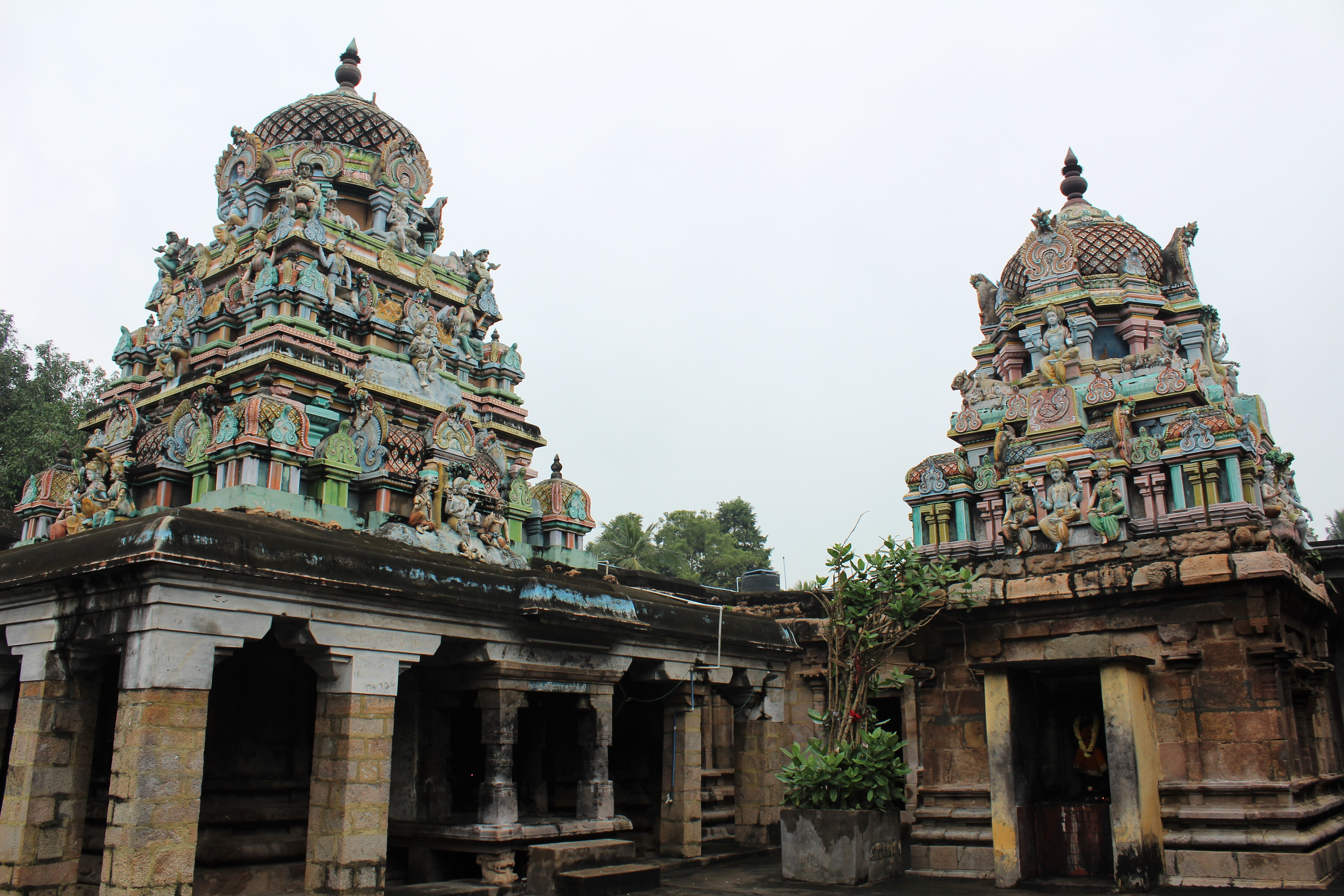
Image of the precinct

Around six inscriptions are found in the temple from the Cholas, Pallavas and Vijayanagara kings. There are inscriptions from the period of Kulothunga Chola, indicating this temple as Kulothunga Cholesawaram. The temple is located in the village of Thirumangalakudi, 2 kilometres from the Aduthurai and 16 km from Kumbakonam. The temple house a five-tiered gateway tower known as gopurams. There are three precincts in the temple. The presiding deity is Prananadeswarar (Shiva) and the Goddess, Mangalambigai (Parvathi). The main deity is believed to be Swayambu Lingam(self formed). The temple faces east and is entered via a five-tiered pyramidal rajagopuram (gateway tower). The presiding deity in the form of lingam is housed in the sanctum in square shape. The attached hall, the ardhamandapa measures the same width as the sanctum, while its length is twice the sanctum. The ardhamandapa projects towards the east. The Mukhamandapa has a square structure. There are five devakoshtas that cover the exterior walls of the sanctum. The images of Dakshinamurthy and Brahma are the only ones remaining out of the five. There are two large Dvarapala, guardian deities on either side of the entrance of the ardhamandapa. The water bodies associated with the temple are Mangala Theertham, the temple tank located outside the temple. There are images of river Kaveri and Meikandadevar located around the shrines of the sanctum.

== Religious importance ==
The temple is revered in the verses of Tevaram, the 7th century Saivite canonical work by the three saint poets, namely, Appar, Sambandar and Sundarar. As the temple is revered in Tevaram, it is classified as Paadal Petra Sthalam, one of the 275 temples that find mention in the Saiva canon. The temple is counted as one of the temples built on the northern banks of River Kaveri. The unique feature of this temple is that all the presiding deities are named Mangalam, indicating prosperity. Parvathi as Mangalambigai, Vinayagar as Mangala Vinayagar, Vimanam (Tower) as Mangala Vimanam, Theertham (Temple Tank) as Mangala Theertham all indicate prosperity. The temple is one of a few temples in South India where Kaali Attam, a dance depiction of Hindu deity Kali is performed. During the KaaLiyaa Attam performance, an evil form depiction succumbs against the dancer performer depicting Kali. The temple and the nearby Suryanar Kovil are closely associated in worship practices. Devotees have to visit Suryanar Kovil after visiting the Thirumangalakudi temple.
