= Kovil Sanna Puram =

Village in India

Kovil Sanna Puram is a village in the Thiruvidaimarudur taluk of Thanjavur district, Tamil Nadu, in India.
