= Kathiramangalam Vana Durga Temple =

Temple in Tamil Nadu, India

Kathiramangalam Vana Durga
- Vana Durga Parameshwari Amman Temple
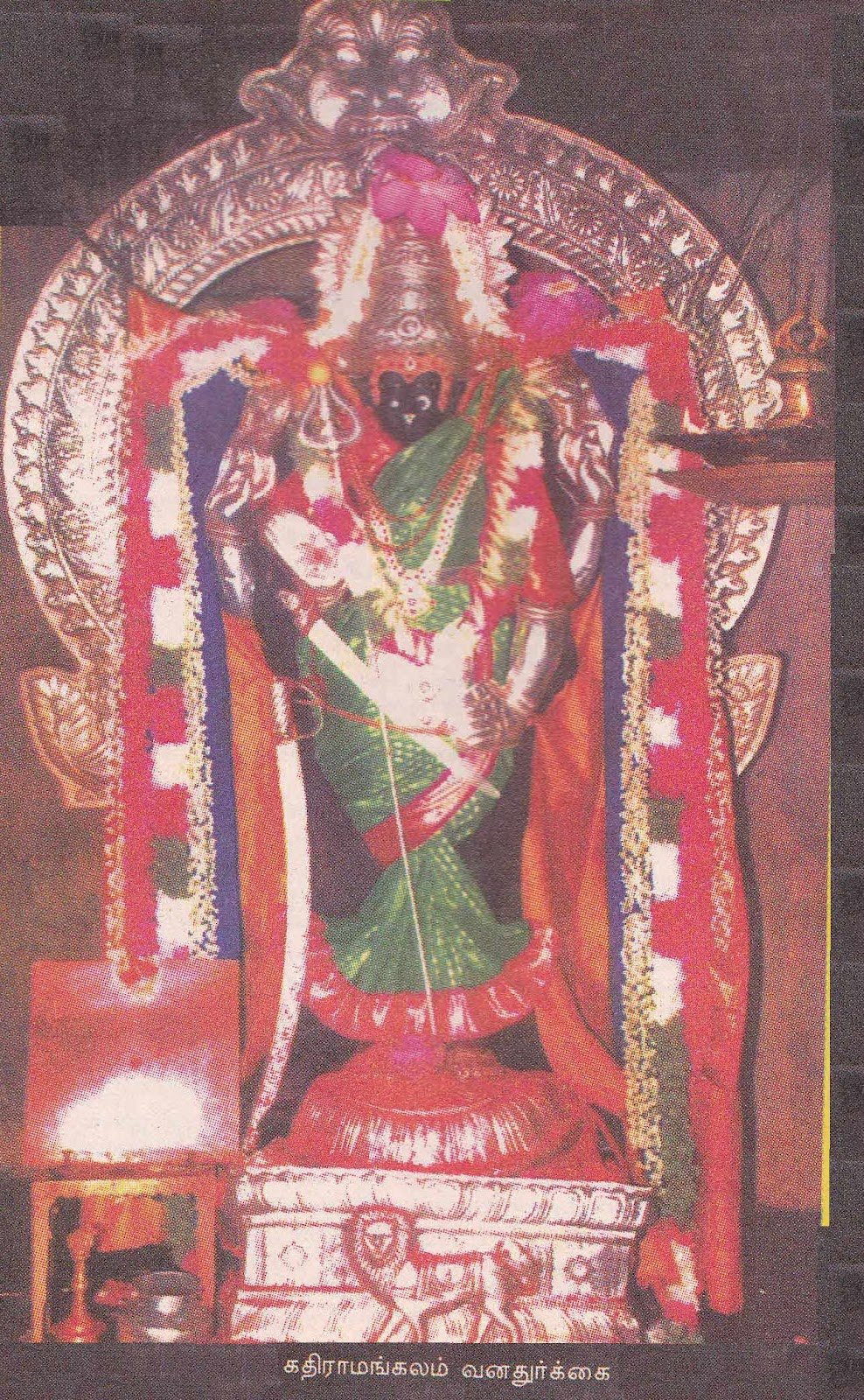
- Vana Durga idol durga devi

Religion
- Affiliation: Hinduism
- Deity: Vana Durga

Location
- Location: Kathiramangalam, Thanjavur district
- State: Tamil Nadu
- Country: India
- Geographic coordinates: 11.07°N 79.52°E

Kathiramangalam Vana Durga, also known as Vana Durga Parameshwari Amman, is a temple situated in Kathiramangalam, Thanjavur District in Tamil Nadu. The temple is located 25 kilometers away from Kumbakonam and 15 kilometers from Mayiladuthurai.

The primary deity of the temple is Vana Durga, a manifestation of the goddess Durga. The main Idol of the temple is 6 feet high and puja in the temple is held during Raahu Kaalam. Contact Chandrasekaran Gurukkal 9443071765 for Abhishekam/Homam. On Weekends, worship is offered to Vana Durga from 8:00 a.m. to 1:00 p.m. and from 4:30 p.m. to 8:00 p.m.

Legends

Kathiramangalam Vana Durga is one of the Nava (9) Durga temples. The presiding deity is Shri Vana Durga Parameswari Amman. It is believed that she visits Kashi during the night and comes back every day. The ancient name of the Village is "Siva Malliga Vanam". Special poojas are held during Raahu Kaalam on Sundays at this temple and the goddess is also called Raahu Kaala Durga.

Legend says that when Agasthiyar came to this vanam (forest), he prayed to this goddess. Markandeya also prayed to this goddess. The full name of the village is "Kathir Veaintha Mangalam". The Tamil Poet Kambar lived there for a time andprayed to Durga when he wrote the Ramayana. In all Shaivite temples Durga is one among the Deities., but Kathiramangalam has a separate temple for Durga ialone Here the Durga is in the Padma Peedam whereas in other temples Durga is in Simma or Mahisha Vahanam. The Temple faces east.

Temple Speciality

People whose Birth star sign is Mrigashirsa Nakshatra have to visit Vana Durga Amman Temple - Kathiramangalam in Tamil Nadu twice a year or at least once in a year. They should stay in the temple or premises for two and a half hours. Visit the Temple in your Birth star or Nakshatra i.e. visit the temple on Mrigashirsha Nakshatra.

Marriages are said to be made in heaven. But nowadays marriages are stopped midway during marriage ceremony for unexplainable reasons. For those who are affected like these things, there is a temple for worship. It is called Vana Durga parameswari Thirukovil. It is situated in a place called Kathiramangalam and is situated 15 km from Kumbakonam and 10 km from Suriyanar Kovil in the route of Kumbakonam to Mayiladuthurai.

The Temple

The primary deity of the temple is Vana Durga, a manifestation of the goddess Durga. The main Idol of the temple is 6 feet high and puja in the temple is held at Ragu kalam. On Weekends worship is offered to Vana Durga from 8:00 a.m to 11:00 a.m.

The Durgai here is faced towards east and is said to be so auspicious. Sage Agasthiar installed this Durgai and sage Mirugandar worshiped this Durgai. Poet Kambar used to pray Vana Durga regularly and once she had covered his house with paddy during heavy rain.

Moolavar: Vana Durga Parameswari

Sthala Theertham: Sivagangai

Sthala Vriksham: Lotus

Prayers

Devotees make archanai to get remedy in various issues by using different flowers like senthamarai for money, malligai for peace, Sevanthi for debit clearance, sevvarali for united family, manoranjitham for reunion of couples, marikolunthu for union of relationships, sembaruthi for business, Roja for marriage.

Temple Timings

Temple is open from 8 am to 1 pm and 4.30 to 8 pm If you wish to perform abishekam then call up the temple priest the previous day so that he can make arrangements such as getting the necessary things when you arrive the following morning. A taxi from Mayiladuthyrai will take about 25 minutes to reach the temple. In 2017, the taxi charge is INR 1200 for 5 hours up to 100 km. There are no shops nearby. So take water bottle with you.

Contact

Sri Vana Durga Parameswari Temple

Kathiramangalam, Tiruvidaimaruthur Taluk

Thanjavur District Phone: Abhishekam/Homam: 9443071765 Phone: +91 4364 232 344, 9443071765

Connectivity

The temple is situated 15 kilometers away from Kumbakonam and 7 kilometers from Mayiladuthurai.

Nearest Railway Station is located at Kumbakonam & Mayiladuthurai. The nearest airport is located at Trichy.
