= Neikuppai =

Neikuppai is a village in the Thiruvidaimarudur taluk of Thanjavur district, India. It is located at a distance of 25 km from Kumbakonam on the road to Pandalur. The Sundareswarar Temple is located here.

== Population ==
According to the 2001 census, the village had a population of 2,062 with 1,053 men and 1,009 women in 479 households. The sex ratio was 958. The literacy rate was 74.
