= Thepperamanallur =

Thepperamanallur is a revenue village in the Thiruvidaimarudur taluk of Thanjavur district, Tamil Nadu, India.
