= Vilva =

Vilva (Russian: Вильва) may refer to several places in Russia:

- Vilva (river), a river in Perm Krai
- Vilva, Gornozavodsky District, a settlement in Gornozavodsky District
- Vilva, Dobryansky District, a settlement in Dobryansky District
