= Sundareswarar Temple, Neikuppai =

Shiva temple in Tamil Nadu, India

Sundareswarar Temple is a Hindu temple located at Neikuppai, Tamil Nadu, India, about 25 kilometres from Kumbakonam. The temple is dedicated to Shiva.

== Significance ==
The temple is about 500–1000 years old and frequented by childless and unmarried people.
