= Thirumangalakudi =

Coordinates: 11.0214°N 79.4714°E

Thirumangalakudi Aduthurai
- village
- Interactive map of Thirumangalakudi
- Country: India
- State: Tamil Nadu
- District: Thanjavur
- Taluk: Thiruvidaimarudur

Population (2011)
  - Total: 7,193

Languages
  - Official: Tamil
- Time zone: UTC+5:30 (IST)
- Postal code: 612102

Thirumangalakudi is a village near Aduthurai in the Thiruvidaimarudur taluk of Thanjavur district in Tamil Nadu, India. Prananadeswarar Temple, a Hindu temple dedicated to Shiva, is located here.

== Demographics ==
According to the 2001 census, Thirumangalakudi had a population of 7,500 with 3,474 males and 3,719 females. The sex ratio was 1,071. The village had a literacy rate of 90. Thirumangalakudi has 5 mosques and size-able amount of muslim population.
