= Kathiramangalam, Thanjavur district =

Kathiramangalam Kathir vaitha mangalam Kadiramangalam
- village
- Country: India
- State: Tamil Nadu
- District: Thanjavur

Languages
  - Official: Tamil
- Time zone: UTC+5:30 (IST)

Kathiramangalam is a village in the Thiruvidaimarudur taluk of Thanjavur district in Tamil Nadu, India. It is situated on the border with Tiruvarur and Nagapattinam districts. The place is known for Kathiramangalam C.S.I Holy Trinity Church.
