= Viswanathapuram =

Village in Tamil Nadu, India

Viswanathapuram is a village situated between Aduthurai to Thiruppanandal, coming under Thiruvidaimarudur Taluk, Sooriyanarkoil post-612102 at Tanjore district. The greenish fields with rice, banana, sugarcane, and cotton are always visible due to dedicated agriculture. This place has plenty of water, using Cauvery river irrigation.

== Surrounding places ==
The villages such as Idayanallur, Ilanganallur, Karprian Kurichi, Nedunthidal, Manikkudi and Thiruloki are nearby surrounded . Out of which Thiruloki is treated as historical place, due to Chola kings has utilized in the name of Thirai loki for collection of revenue (Tamil name Thirai).

The wife of Raja Raja Chola I named 'Thirailokkiya Madevi' belongs Thiruloki and is referred to as ‘Thirailokkiya Madevi Chathurvedi mangalam’ in inscriptions, later as Thiruloki.

This village comes under Thiruvidaimarudur legislative assembly and Mayiladuthurai Parliamentary constitution with a population of 250 people around 0.5 square kilometer area (as on 2013). Thiruppanandal and Aduthurai are two minor commercial places and Kumbakonam is a major commercial place. Facilities like lighting, water, and roads are developed but transport is still not yet developed efficiently.

== Geography ==
The temperature is around 20 to 38 °C (68 to 100 °F), elevation is 58 feet (18 m) above sea level and soils are black and grey mixed clay soil. The period from October to January is a pleasant time to visit for natural views covered by plenty of water, birds, climates with greenish atmosphere everywhere.

== Culture ==
This village is called as "Viswanathapuram" from the name of God 'Viswanathar'. The temple inside the village named as 'Vishalatchi Amman', and it makes natural correlation, relationship with Lord Viswanathar. This people gives importance to describe their village as Kaasiyin veesam Viwanathapuram, and believes veesam part of Varanasi is Viswanathapuram. The culture is still traditionally followed by "somavaaram" to worship Lord Siva and Parwathi during Karthikai month every Monday, which reflects their involvement with previous culture.

The Pongal days are celebrated during January by all levels of people.

== Temples ==
The familiar Navagraha Sun Temple at Sooriyanarkoil, Sukran temple at Kanjanur, and Ezhu Loka Thiripura Nayaki Amman temple, Thiruloki Perumal Temple are surrounded remarkable places.

Most temples in and around are followed with Lord Sivan admire. and the agricultural lands mostly belong to Thiruppanadal Shiva mutt.

== Education ==
They depends for elementary and middle school education from Idayanallur or Chitridaiyanallur, and high school education from Aduthurai or Thiruppanandal. The educational rate has gradually increased, and around 70% of people have received their educational knowledge. People nowadays started gradually to work at different places based on their education and job profession.
