= Tamil Nadu Rice Research Institute =

Indian agricultural research institute

- Type: University Research Institute
- Established: 1985
- Chancellor: Governor of Tamil Nadu
- Students: 7500
- Location: Aduthurai, Thanjavur District, Tamil Nadu, India
- Campus: Rural
- Affiliations: Tamil Nadu Agricultural University
- Website: sites.tnau.ac.in/trri/

The Tamil Nadu Rice Research Institute (TRRI) is an Indian research institute working in the field of rice under Tamil Nadu Agricultural University (TNAU). Situated in Aduthurai, in Thanjavur district, it was established in April, 1985 in TNAU to meet the research requirements of the region with the help of existing Agricultural Colleges and Research centres and perform lead function for rice and rice based cropping system research. TRRI coordinate the research programmes of all the stations of the state on rice and rice based cropping system research. This directorate responsible for coordinating research in the Region II of the TNAU.

== History ==
It is first established as a Research Station at Manganallur in 1912, subsequently shifted to Aduthurai as Agricultural Research Station in 1922. In 1962 it was renamed as Regional Research Station, and about a decade later in 1973, University Research Centre of Tamil Nadu Agricultural University (TNAU) started in State Regional Research Station and University. Finally in 1981, the two Research Centres were merged and named Tamil Nadu Rice Research Institute. At that time the research station at Tirur Village was also brought under the university's control. it was elevated as a Directorate (Rice Lead Centre) of the university in 1985.

== Units ==
The following units operate at TRRI:

- Crop Improvement
- Crop management
- Plant Protection
