= Thenkurangaduthurai Temple, Aduthurai =

Shiva temple in Tamil Nadu, India

Thenkurangaaduturai
- Aduthurai Temple
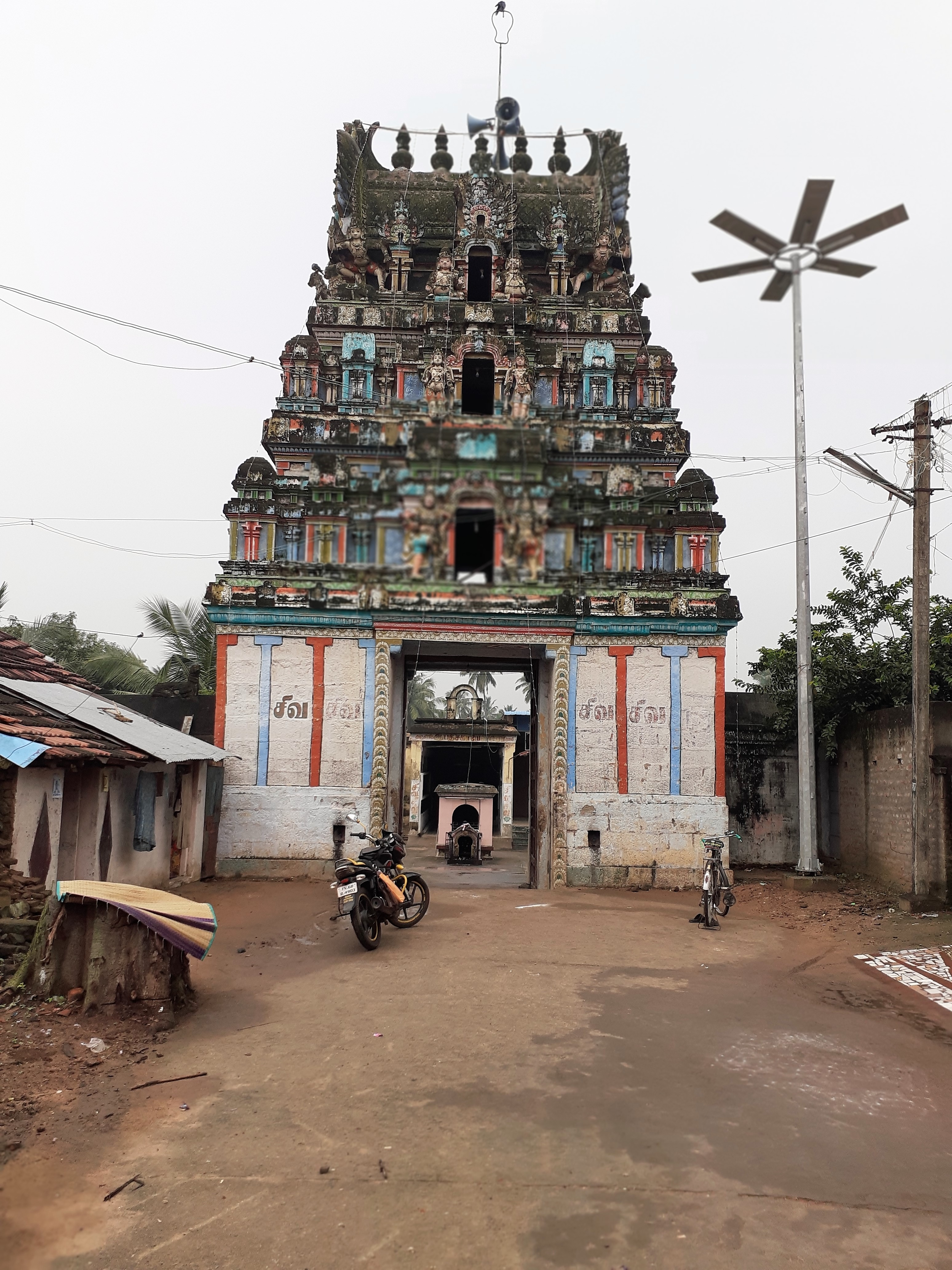

- Location in Tamil Nadu

Religion
- Affiliation: Hinduism
- District: Tanjore
- Deity: Abathsagaeswarar (Shiva)

Location
- Location: Aduthurai,
- State: Tamil Nadu
- Country: India
- Coordinates: 11°00′N 79°18′E

Architecture
- Type: Dravidian architecture

Abathsahayeswarar Temple, Aduthurai (also calledTen Kurangaadutrai Temple, Aduthurai) is a Hindu temple dedicated to Shiva in the village of Aduthurai, Tamil Nadu, India. Shiva is worshipped as Apathsaheswarar, and is represented by the lingam. His consort Parvati is depicted as Prabhavalli. The presiding deity is revered in the 7th century Tamil Saiva canonical work, the Tevaram, written by Tamil saint poets known as the nayanars and classified as Paadal Petra Sthalam.

It houses two gateway towers known as gopurams. The tallest is the western tower, with five stories and a height of 72 feet (22 m). The Aippassi Annabhishekam festival is celebrated during the day of the Aippasi (October - November) is the most prominent festival.

The temple was originally built by the Cholas and has around fifteen inscriptions from them. The present masonry structure was built during the Nayak during the 16th century. In modern times, the temple is maintained and administered by Thiruvaduthurai Adheenam, a Saiva monastic institution.

== Legend ==
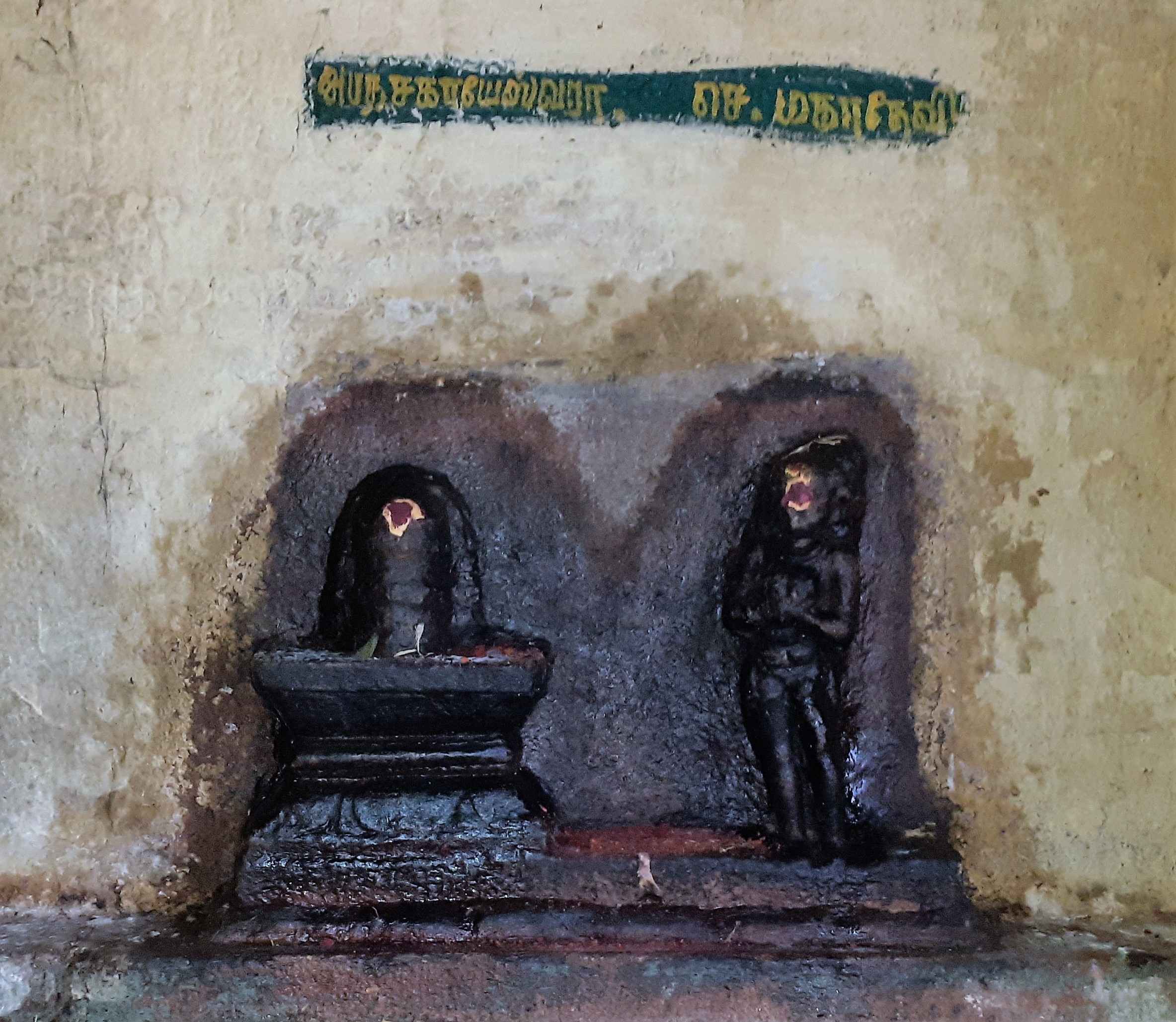
Legend of Sugriva worshipping Shiva

As per Hindu legend, during the Ramayana times, the monkey king Vaali had a fight with a demon king. They both started fighting for a long time inside a cave. Vaali's brother Sugriva was guarding the cave at the entrance. At one point, blood started flowing like a river. Sugriva felt that Vaali was killed in the combat and he closed the cave with a rock. He informed the incident to the people and he was crowned the king of Kishkintha. Vaali who eventually won the battle, came back to see that Sugriva was occupying his throne. He felt Sugriva deceived him and tried to kill him. Sugriva is believed to have prayed to Shiva at this place. Shiva was pleased by the devotion of Sugriva and rescued him from his brother Vaali because Sugriva could not compete with Vaali in a fight. Sugriva prayed to Shiva who turned Sugriva to a swan and kept him above the 'Vilva' tree, so Vaali could not find him. It is believed Rama searching for Sita came here with Hanuman and Sugriva and prayed here which gives an additional tribute to this temple. Since Shiva descended to save his devotee in danger, he is called Apathsahayeswarar (Apath means danger, Sahyayam means rescuer). The temple is counted as one of the temples built on the banks of River Kaveri. Since a monkey (called Kurangu in Tamil) worshipped Shiva in place on the banks of a river (Attru thurai in Tamil) the place came to be known as Kungatruthurai. Since there is another temple with a similar name is located on the north, this place is called Then Kurangatruthurai, the one located on the South.

== Architecture ==
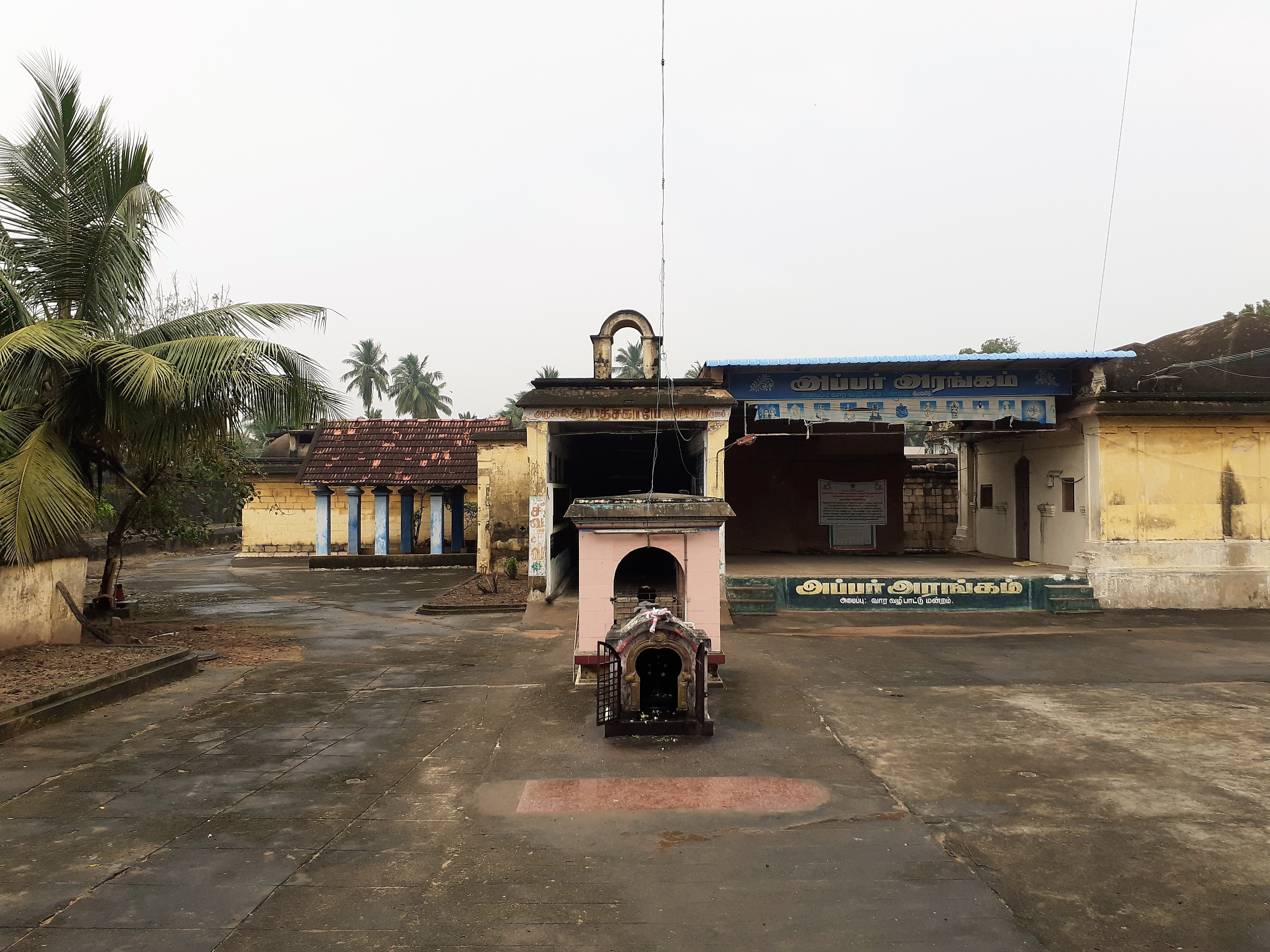
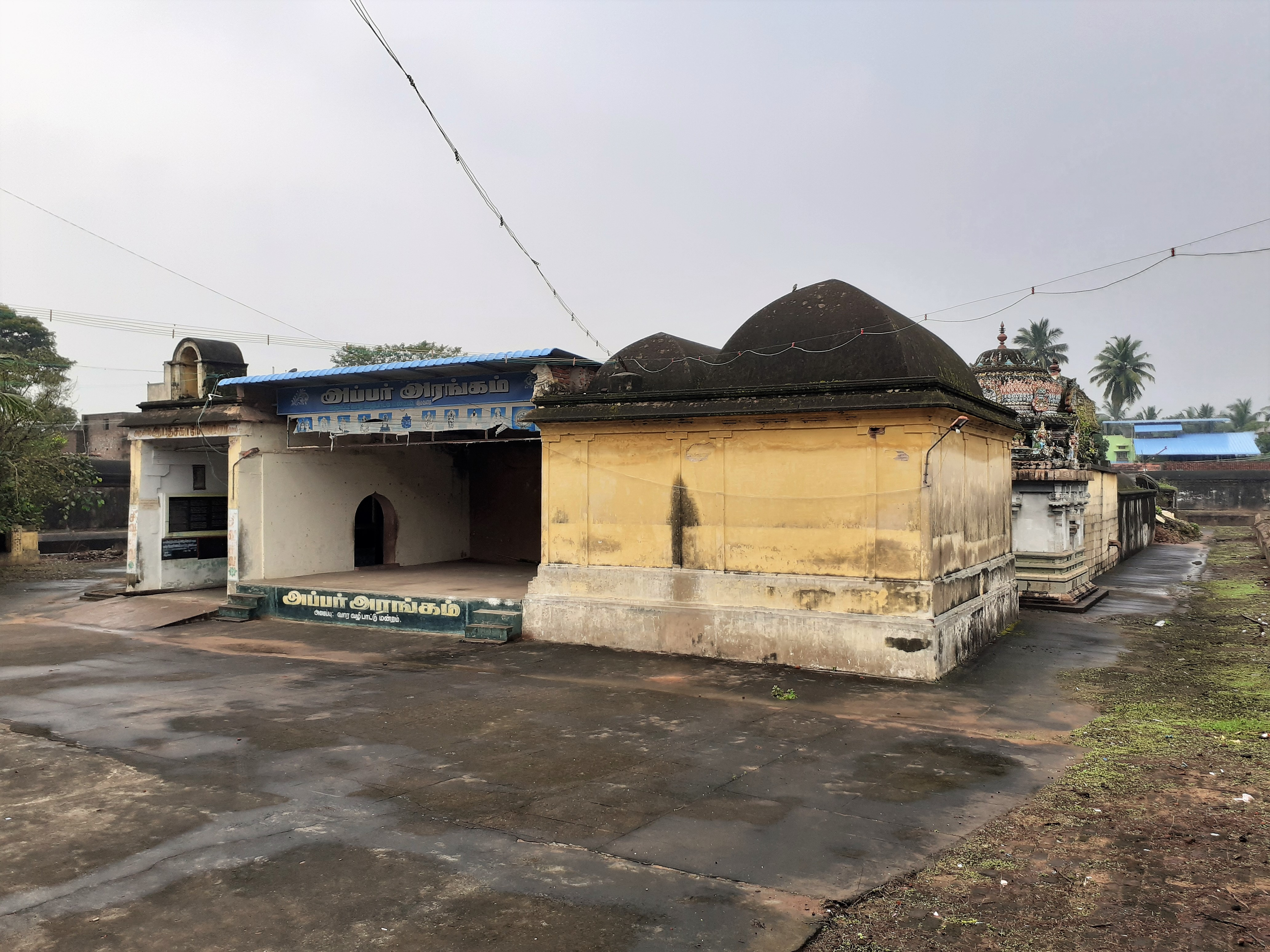
Shrines within the temple

The temple is located in Aduthurai, 14 km away from Kumbakonam on the Kumbakonam- Mayiladuthurai road. The Aduthurai railway station is also close by to the temple. The temple is surrounded by vast streets on all the four sides. The temple is built in Dravidian style with Vimaanas and a three-storied Gopuram. This temple is under the maintenance of Thiruvaduthurai Adheenam, a Saiva monastic institution. The temple is believed to have been built by Sembiyan Mahadevi, the Chola queen. The plaque of Sugriva worshipping Shiva is seen on the walls around the sanctum in the first precinct. There are fifteen inscriptions in the temple belonging to various kings like Parantaka II (Sundara) (963–980), Rajaraja I (985–1014), Kulothunga I (1070–1120), Virarajendra (1063–1070) and Marna Cataiyan. All the shrines of the temple are located inside the concentric walls of the temple. The sanctum is axial to the entrance tower facing east. The shrine of Mangalambigai is located in the hall leading to the sanctum and faces south. The shrine of Ambal faces South. The precinct around the sanctum has images of Vinayaka, Arumuga with Valli, Gajalakshmi and Nataraja. There is a small stage called Appar Arangam near the temple flag post. One of the earliest bronze and stone statues of Nataraja are found in the temple, which is believed to have been donated by Sembian Mahadevi, a Chola queen.

The temple is one of those built on the banks of River Kaveri.
