= Vannakkudi =

- village
- Interactive map of Vannakkudi
- Coordinates: 10.999912°N 79.468279°E
- Country: India
- State: Tamil Nadu
- District: Thanjavur
- Taluk: Thiruvidaimarudur

Languages
  - Official: Tamil
- Time zone: UTC+5:30 (IST)

Vannakkudi is a village in the Thiruvidaimarudur taluk of Thanjavur district, Tamil Nadu, in India.

== Famous places ==
This village contains the Mariyamman temple and Samadhi of Vikrama Chozan just 1 km east of Mahalineswarar temple Thiruvidaimarudur - Lingathadi thidal - presently a private property. It was known Thiyagasamudra Chaturvedi mangalam during Vikrama period then renamed as Kulothunga chozha charutvedi Mangalam and eastern road to Vannakkudi was called Rajakkal Thambiran Thirveedhi.
