= Maruthuvakudi =

Maruthuvakudi Aduthurai
- town panchayat/Sub urban
- Location in Tamil Nadu, India
- Coordinates: 11°00′55″N 79°28′55″E
- Country: India
- State: Tamil Nadu
- District: Thanjavur district
- Capital: Aduthurai
- Largest city: Thanjavur

Area
  - Total: 2.5 km^{2} (0.97 sq mi)
- Elevation: 19.5 m (64 ft)

Population (2001)
  - Total: 11,455
  - Density: 5,000/km^{2} (13,000/sq mi)

Languages
  - Official: Tamil
- Time zone: UTC+5:30 (IST)
- PIN: 612101
- Telephone code: 91 435

Maruthuvakudi, also known as Aduthurai, is a small panchayat town situated near Kumbakonam, on the way to Mayiladuthurai, located in the Thanjavur District in the Indian state of Tamil Nadu. It is the sub urban region of business city of Kumbakonam.

== Etymology ==
Maruthuvakudi takes its name from the demon Maruthuvasura, who lived there according to legend.

The name Aduthurai comes from the Tamil word Thenkurangaduthurai, which translates to "southern land where monkeys used to dance". This is also the name of a Hindu temple dedicated to Shiva located there. The epic tales of Ramayana, in which monkeys play an important role, and especially the tales of Hanuman, may be linked to this name.

== Geography ==
There are two rivers to the north of Aduthurai: the Veera Chozhan river and the Cauvery. The landscape of rivers, trees, and paddy fields around Viswanathapuram is typical of Thanjavur district.

== Demographics ==
=== Population ===
As of the 2001 India census, Maruthuvakudi had a population of 11,455. Ten percent of the population was under six years of age. Males and females each constitute 50 percent of the population. Maruthuvakudi's literacy rate is 76 percent, considerably higher than the national average of 59.5 percent.

== Culture/Cityscape ==
=== Tourist Attractions ===
Aduthurai's major attraction is the Ten Kurangaaduturai Temple, which is believed to be the place where Sugreeva worshiped Lord Shiva. This highly revered shivasthalam is one of two Kurangaaduturai temples in Aduthurai, located south of the Cauvery River.

Airavateswarar Temple, Maruthuvakudi is a temple for Lord Shiva.

As per a legend, Indra, the god-king of Heaven, and his white elephant Airavata were cursed by Sage Durvasa for throwing a garland given to them by the god Brahma. Indra lost his Kingdom and Airavata turned black. He worshipped the god Shiva here and was eventually released from the curse. It is also the place where Shiva slew the demon Marutthuvasura, from which the name of the village originated from.

== Transport ==
=== By Rail ===
There is a railway station.

=== By Road ===
A bus terminal in the town connects it with other parts of Tamil Nadu. Bus route numbers A1, B1, 15A, 15B, 17, 27A, 27B, 27C, 33A, 33B, 53, 54 and 64 operates via the bus terminal. Various private and government long haul buses stop here connecting this town with major cities like Chennai, Coimbatore, Tiruchirappalli, Rameswaram, Palani, Pudhuchery, Cuddalore (also spelt as Kadalur) and Madurai. The nearest major railway station, Kumbakonam, is 14 kilometers away. The daily Uzhavan Express train to Chennai stops there.

The town is located on the Mayiladuthurai – Kumbakonam highway, and buses are available from Mayiladuthurai and Kumbakonam.

== Medical facilities ==
Bawaa Medical Aduthurai is located on Railway Road.

== Education ==
=== Schools ===
The Sri Kumara Gurupara Swamigal Higher Secondary School (KGSHSS) is the higher secondary school in Aduthurai. There are about 3,000 students in this school studying in both English and Tamil medium (from 6th to 12th grade). It has a computer science curriculum for +2 students, and a well established computer lab. The KGS Primary school, located on Perumal Koil Street, has classes for grades 1 to 5.

The Crescent Matriculation School is located in the nearby town of Avaniapuram and has over 2,000 students up to +2 level.

The Rice City Matriculation Higher Secondary School, situated near the Aduthurai railway station, aims to provide an all-round education for children at a low cost but with the same standard as the city schools.

=== Tamil Nadu Rice Research Institute ===
The Tamil Nadu Rice Research Institute is located in Aduthurai. The research station was first established at Manganallur in 1912, and was shifted to Aduthurai in 1922. In 1962 it was renamed the Regional Research Institute. In 1981, after 19 years of successful operation, it changed its name again to Tamil Nadu Rice Research Institute, or TRRI, and was elevated to Directorate of Rice Research Lead Centre in 1985.

The institute occupies around 64 hectares and produces various high-quality breeds of rice and cane sugar. The institute's main focus is on promoting short-term cultivation. Some noteworthy breeds developed here are Aduthurai 32 (ADT-32) and Aduthurai 36 (ADT-36).

== See also ==
- Vannakkudi (வண்ணக்குடி)
