= Manalmedu =

Manalmedu Naganathapuram
- Panchayat Town
- Location in Tamil Nadu, India
- Coordinates: 10.965°N 79.773°E
- Country: India
- State: Tamil Nadu
- District: Mayiladuthurai

Government
  - Type: panchayat Town

Population (2001)
  - Total: 10,201

Languages
  - Official: Tamil
- Time zone: UTC+5:30 (IST)
- Postal code: 609202
- Vehicle registration: TN-51 TN-82

Manalmedu is a panchayat town in Mayiladuthurai district in the Indian state of Tamil Nadu. It comes under Mayiladuthurai Taluk. The town is located 15 km from Mayiladuthurai town, 33 km from Kumbakonam and 15 km from kattumannarkoil town.

== Demographics ==
As of 2001 India census, Manalmedu had a population of 10201. Males constitute 51% of the population and females 49%. Manalmedu has an average literacy rate of 74%, higher than the national average of 59.5%: male literacy is 82%, and female literacy is 66%. In Manalmedu, 10% of the population is under 6 years of age...

The ancient name was called "Naganathapuram" by the name of Lord shiva temple shri. Naganatha swami' (naga means snake). The temple was believed to worshipped by the 'doumiya' rishi the guru of pandavas during their exile life.

The village "puthamangalam", birthplace of the famous Tamil writer, freedom fighter and pioneering journalist Kalki Krishnamurthy, is near this panchayat. Kundrakudi Adikalar was born in this town.

Manalmedu is largely Hindu Paraiyar and Vanniyars being the dominant Hindu community. Konar, Naidu, Karkatha Vellalars, Kallars, Mudaliars and Chettiars are other significant communities in the town.

This panchayat town is having Two government higher secondary schools and private schools. The boys higher secondary school is one of the oldest school in this circle, which was established way back 1948. The spinning mill at Manalmedu is now functioning as the Government Arts College.
