= Tugili =

- Village
- Country: India
- State: Tamil Nadu
- District: Thanjavur

Languages
  - Official: Tamil
- Time zone: UTC+5:30 (IST)
- Vehicle registration: TN-

Tugili is a village in the Thanjavur District of Tamil Nadu, India. It is next to the village of Kanjanoor.

There is a temple for Lord Shiva in this village. It is believed that worshipping in this temple would ensure that the worshipper does not face any issues in getting proper clothing.
