= Vilva, Dobryansky District =

Vilva Вильва
- Settlement
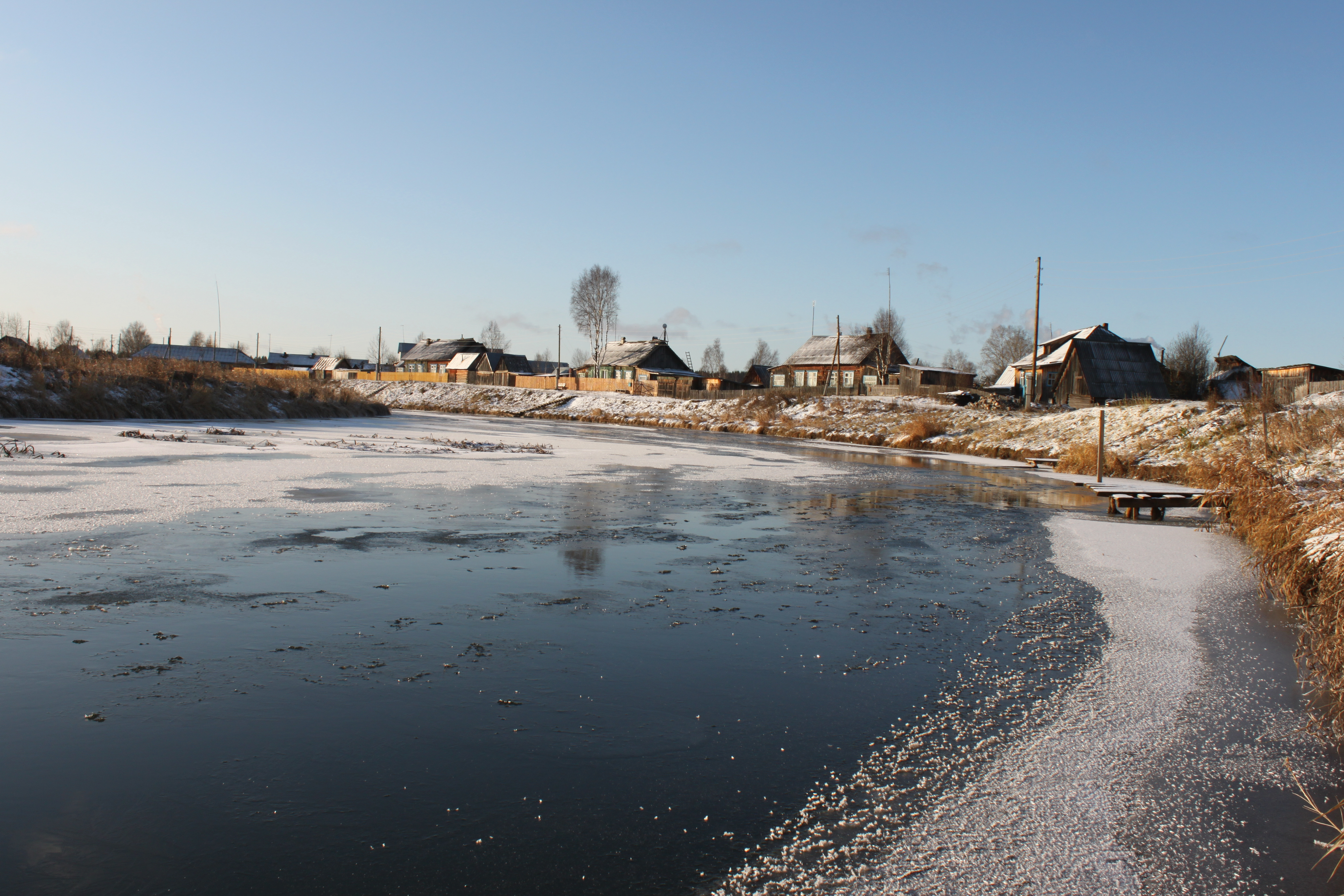
- Vilva in winter

- Location within Perm Krai Location within Russia
- Coordinates: 58°37′N 56°58′E
- Country: Russia
- Region: Perm Krai
- District: Dobryansky District
- Time zone: UTC+5:00

Vilva (Russian: Вильва) is a rural locality (a settlement) and the administrative center of Vilvenskoye Rural Settlement, Dobryansky District, Perm Krai, Russia. The population was 966 as of 2010. There are 24 streets.

== Geography ==
Vilva is located 49 km northeast of Dobryanka (the district's administrative centre) by road. Bokovaya is the nearest rural locality.
