= Vilva, Gornozavodsky District =

Vilva Вильва
- Settlement
- Location within Perm Krai Location within Russia
- Coordinates: 58°38′N 58°14′E
- Country: Russia
- Region: Perm Krai
- District: Gornozavodsky District
- Time zone: UTC+5:00

Vilva (Russian: Вильва) is a rural locality (a settlement) in Gornozavodsky District, Perm Krai, Russia. The population was 341 as of 2010. There are 20 streets.

== Geography ==
Vilva is located 45 km north of Gornozavodsk (the district's administrative centre) by road. Vizhaysky Priisk is the nearest rural locality.
