= Anaikarai =

- village
- Location in Tamil Nadu, India Anaikarai (India)
- Coordinates: 11.140093°N 79.452653°E
- Country: India
- State: Tamil Nadu
- District: Thanjavur

Population (2001)
  - Total: 2,757

Languages
  - Official: Tamil
- Time zone: UTC+5:30 (IST)
- Postal code: 612502
- Vehicle registration: TN 68

Anaikarai is a village panchayat under Thiruvidaimarudur Taluk in Tanjavur district, Tamil Nadu, India. Anaikarai connects with two major bridges. Nearly 1 km long on both sides. It is an island in the basin of Cauvery river. It is located at the distance of 260 km from Chennai and 25 km from Kumbakonam.

The Lower Anaicut built by Sir Arthur Cotton in 19th century AD across Coleroon, the major distributary of Cauvery, is said to be a replicated structure of Kallanai. Nearly 2000 families live in Anaikarai with the main occupation of agriculture and fishing. It is well known and place for river fishes.

== Demographics ==
Anaikkarai is divided into two regions, since it falls into two different districts of Ariyalur and Thanjavur.The population of vadakarai(kandiankollai) is not included into the population of Anaikkarai. The population of Anaikkarai (area between two bridges and Thenkarai a.k.a. Vinayagar theru) is regarded as the population of Vinayagar theru in 2011 census. Vinayagantheru village has population of 3551 of which 1796 are males while 1755 are females with 888 families residing. 10.26% of population are below the age of six. Average Sex Ratio of Vinayagantheru village is 977 which is lower than Tamil Nadu state average of 996. Child Sex Ratio for the Vinayagantheru is 904, lower than Tamil Nadu average of 943. Vinayagantheru village has higher literacy rate compared to Tamil Nadu. In 2011, literacy rate of Vinayagantheru village was 82.83% compared to 80.09% of Tamil Nadu. In Vinayagantheru Male literacy stands at 91.36% while female literacy rate was 74.18%.

== Temples ==
Sri Villiandavar (Ayyanar) temple is located in the west side of Anaikarai. It was built by Chola empire. The present Sri Villiandavar koil was renovated in early 2000 during Ms. Jayalalitha's regime. This temple is located in the mid of Cauvery river and Cauvery flows in "U" direction surrounding the temple. The temple also houses many statues of elephants and horses.

The Great Temple of Gangaikondacholisvaram is located just 10 km from Anaikarai.

== Transport ==
Anaikkarai is located at the distance of 260 km from Chennai and 25 km from Kumbakonam. Anaikkarai remains an important connecting point between Chennai and delta districts However the two bridges connecting Anaikarai with Kumbakonam is barred for heavy vehicles due to weakening after the heavy rains of 2009

The bridge has been repaired and opened to public for transport from 25 January 2012. Shortly after opening the bridge, both the bridges were again closed for heavy vehicles in 2013 and opened shortly in 24 Aug 2014 and closed again in 2017. Since then, only the light vehicles are allowed and cement barricades are built on both sides for pedestrians.

New four lane bridge is being constructed as that part of upgrading of NH-32 which doesn't passed through the village.

== Lower Anaicut dam ==
There are two dams, north and south one. These dams were built on Kollidam river by British government in 1902 for irrigation. Vadavar river, which has separate dam starts from the North Dam and drains into Veeranam reservoir. Most of the year, the dam remains dry. The river teems with crocodiles. A man reportedly died from crocodile attack .
