= Maanturai Amravaneswarar Temple =

Tirumaanturai Amravaneswarar Temple
- Manthurai Sivan Temple
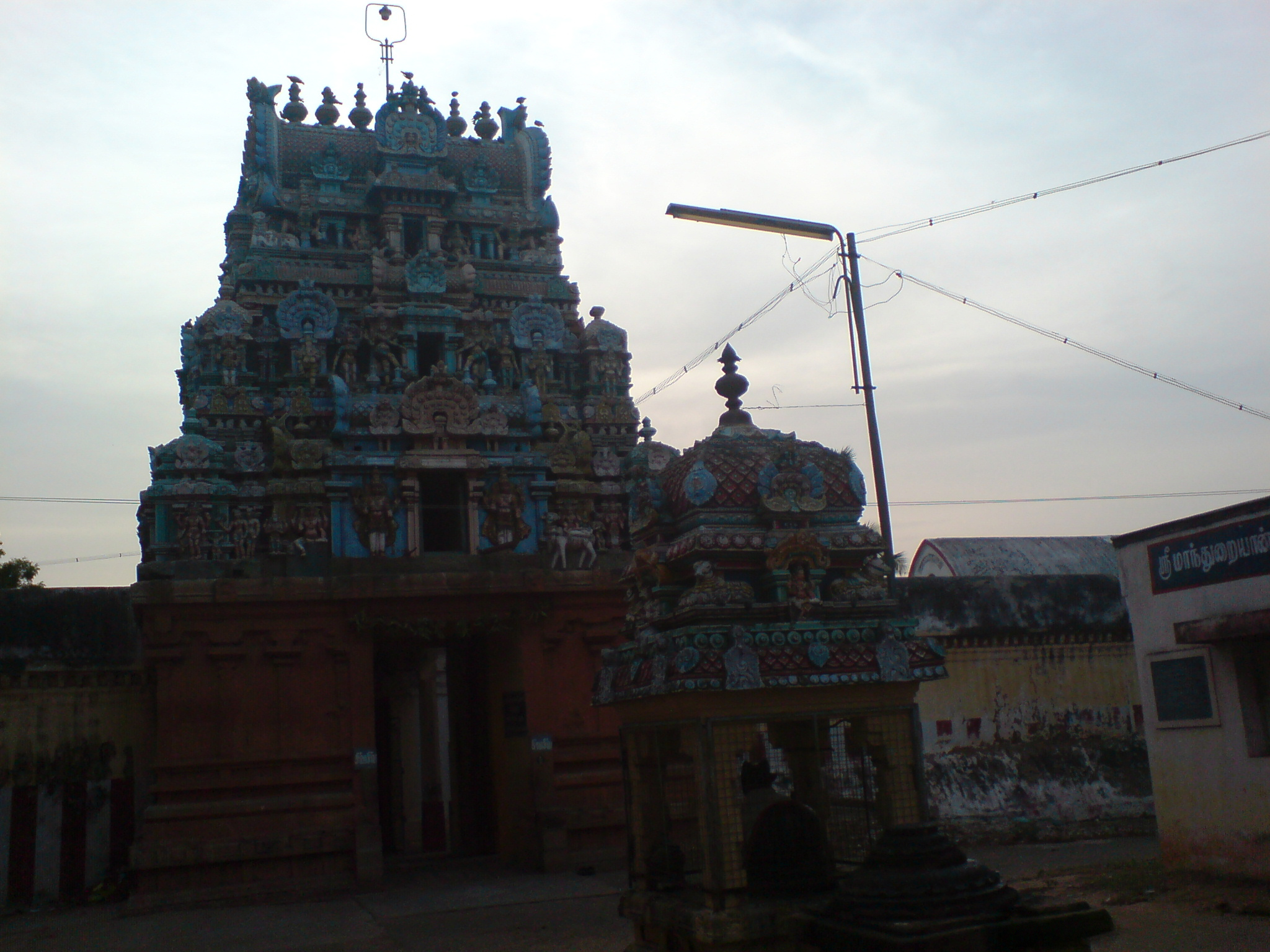

- Location in Tamil Nadu

Religion
- Affiliation: Hinduism
- District: Trichy
- Deity: Maanthuraiyappar, Amravaneswarar (Shiva) Azhagammai, BalaAmbigai (Parvathi)
- Features: Temple tank: Gayathri Nadi

Location
- Location: Manthurai
- State: Tamil Nadu
- Country: India
- Coordinates: 10°51′0″N 78°52′0″E

Architecture
- Type: Dravidian architecture

Maanturai Amravaneswarar Temple, is a temple dedicated to Hindu deity Shiva, located in Manturai, a village in the outskirts of Trichy, in the South Indian state of Tamil Nadu. It is one of the 275 Paadal Petra Sthalams, where the three of the most revered Nayanars (Saivite Saints), Appar and Tirugnana Sambandar have glorified the temple with their verses during the 7th-8th century. The temple has been widely expanded by Chola kings during the 11th century. The temple has three tiered gateway tower and a tank. Since Shiva bestowed a deer with a mango, this place is called Manthurai.

The temple has six daily rituals at various times from 5:30 a.m. to 10 p.m., and twelve yearly festivals on its calendar. The Chittirai festival during the Tamil month of Chittirai (April - May) is celebrated for fifteen days, portraying the various incidents associated with the temple legend. The temple is maintained and administered by the Hindu Religious and Endowment Board of the Government of Tamil Nadu.

== Legend ==
Shiva bestowed a deer with a mango here. Since Shiva bestowed a deer with a mango, this place is called Manthurai (maan is deer in Tamil). Surya, Chandra, Kanvar and Vishnu are said to have worshipped Shiva here. Mrikandu Munivar (father of Markandeya) and a deer are said to have worshipped Shiva under a mango tree, and this legend is illustrated in stucco in the temple. Brahma, the Hindu god of creation, is said to have brought the Gayatri Nadi at the completion of his worship here, and his act of having made the false claim of having seen the top of the column of fire in which Shiva had manifested himself, was absolved here. It is believed that sage Mrikandeeswara is believed to have performed penance at this temple and hence it is also called Mrikandeswarapura.

Indra, the king of celestial deities, is said to have worshipped Shiva to absolve himself of the sin of having deceived Ahalya, the wife of Gowtama Rishi. Bhrama and Vishnu adorn the niches in the walls of the sanctum. This place has been referred to in Thevaram, the Saiva anthology written by Saint Poet (7th Century AD) Thirugnana Sambanthar and Appar.

== Architecture ==
This temple is situated 15 km from Trichy in Maanthurai, a village in Trichy - Lalgudi road. The nearest railway station is at Lalgudi and the nearest airport is Tiruchirappalli International Airport. The Shiva temple at Manturai is spread over an area of 1.5 acres (6,100 m^{2}). The main rajagopuram is on the east side with three tiers. Inside the temple, there are two corridors. At the main entrance, the sculptures of Ganapathy and Muruga can be found on both the sides. The main shrine accommodates the image of Shiva known as Amravaneswarar and the Ambal his consort is known as Balambigai. There are lot of inscriptions in the walls of the temple revealing Chola architecture. There is a separate shrine for Balambigai to the right of Vedapureeswarar's sanctum. The first precinct on the four sides of the sanctum sanctorum are decorated with the images of Nayanmars, Murugan Sannadhi in the northwest and Durga Sannadhi on the northeast. The temple has Navagraha, which is sculpted in a lotus pedestal.

== Worship practices and festivals ==
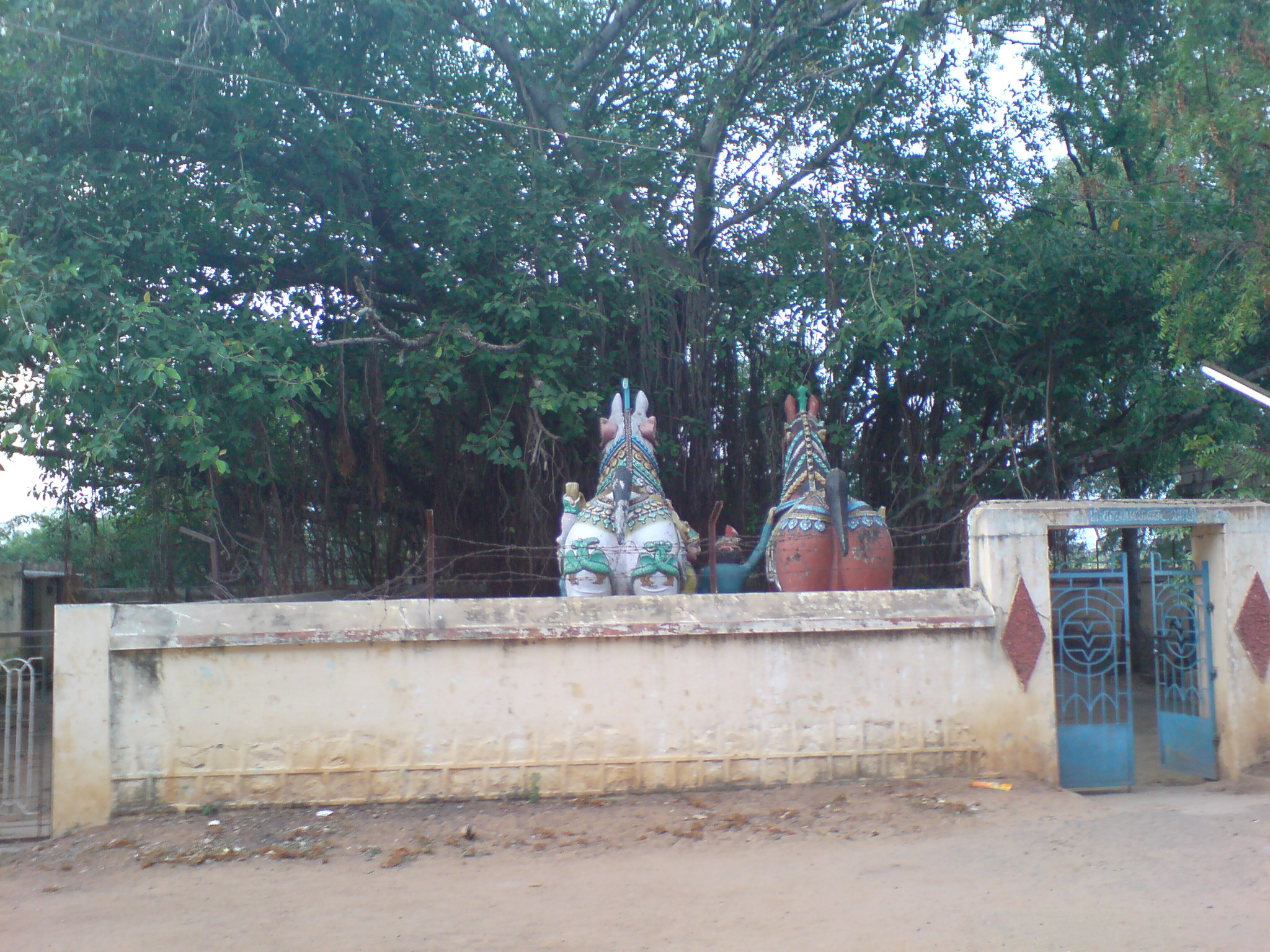
Images of horse sculptures outside the main entrance of the temple

The temple is one of the shrines of the 275 Paadal Petra Sthalams - Shiva Sthalams glorified in the early medieval Tevaram poems by Tamil Saivite Nayanar Sambandar. The temple is frequented by Hindu devotees with birth star of Moola praying for marriage and the temple is locally referred as Moola Nakshatra Parikara Stalam.

The temple priests perform the pooja (rituals) during festivals and on a daily basis. Like other Shiva temples of Tamil Nadu, the priests belong to the Shaivaite community, a Brahmin sub-caste. The temple rituals are performed six times a day; Ushathkalam at 5:30 a.m., Kalasanthi at 8:00 a.m., Uchikalam at 10:00 a.m., Sayarakshai at 6:00 p.m., Irandamkalam at 8:00 p.m. and Ardha Jamam at 10:00 p.m. Each ritual comprises four steps: abhisheka (sacred bath), alangaram (decoration), neivethanam (food offering) and deepa aradanai (waving of lamps) for both Mathuraiyappar and Azhagammai. The worship is held amidst music with nagaswaram (pipe instrument) and tavil (percussion instrument), religious instructions in the Vedas read by priests and prostration by worshippers in front of the temple mast. There are weekly rituals like somavaram and sukravaram, fortnightly rituals like pradosham and monthly festivals like amavasai (new moon day), kiruthigai, pournami (full moon day) and sathurthi. Annabishekam during the Tamil month of Aipassi (October–November), Karthikai Deepan during November–December and Adi Sankaracharya Jayanti in Vaikasi (May–June) are the festivals celebrated in the temple.
