= Tirur Village =

Neighbourhood in Tiruvallur district, Tamil Nadu, India

Coordinates: 13.1087°N 79.9594°E

Tirur village (or Tiruvur) is a panchayat located in the Thiruvallur district of Tamil-Nadu state, India.

== Geography ==
Chennai is the state capital for Tirur village. It is located around 35.3 kilometers from Tirur. The village is connected by rail route from the Chennai central suburbs nearest railway stations are Sevvapettai 1.5 km.

The surrounding nearby villages and its distance from Tirur are Aranvoyal 1.3 km, Perumalpattu 2.9 km, Putlur 3.9 km, Thaneerkulam 4.8 km, Ayalur 7.0 km, Tiruvallur 7.4 km, Veeraragavapuram 7.6 km, Sivanvoyal 7.9 km, Ikkadu 8.1 km, Koyambakkam 8.1 km, Perathur 8.3 km, Ikkadukandigai 8.4 km, Kalyanakuppam 9.9 km, Melanur 10.9 km, Vishnuvakkam 11.4 km, Velliyur 13.3 km, Karikalavakkam 13.6 km, Arumbakkam 26.2 km, Vilapakkam, Thozhur, Selai. The village straddles the Cooum River.

- Altitude : 39.47m MSL
- Average rainfall : 1184mm
- Maximum temperature (Mean) : 33.1˚C
- Minimum temperature (Mean): 22.5˚C
- Soil : Sandy clay, Non-calcareous light brown Medium fertile

== Religion ==
The village has a Shiva Temple which is more than 1,000 years old. The temple was converted as rock temple by Jatavarman Sundara Pandyan I around 1260CE. The temple name is Arulmigu Singandeswarar Udanurai Uthbalambal Thirukovil. The temple is very near to the Teachers Training Institution and can be reached by public transportation from the railway station. Also, there is an old Kariamanicka Perumal temple just opposite this Sivan temple which is in dilapidated condition. This temple made up of special red stones.

== Agriculture ==
The Tamil Nadu Paddy experimental station was founded in Tirur in 1942. In 1981 it was moved under the control of Tamil Nadu Agricultural University and the following year renamed as Rice Research Station. It is located about 1.5 km from Sevvapet Road Railway station. It has a crop-growing area of 12 hectares and besides rice it cultivates pulses, oil seeds and green manures.
