= Thiruvidaimarudur Taluk =

Taluk in Tamil Nadu, India

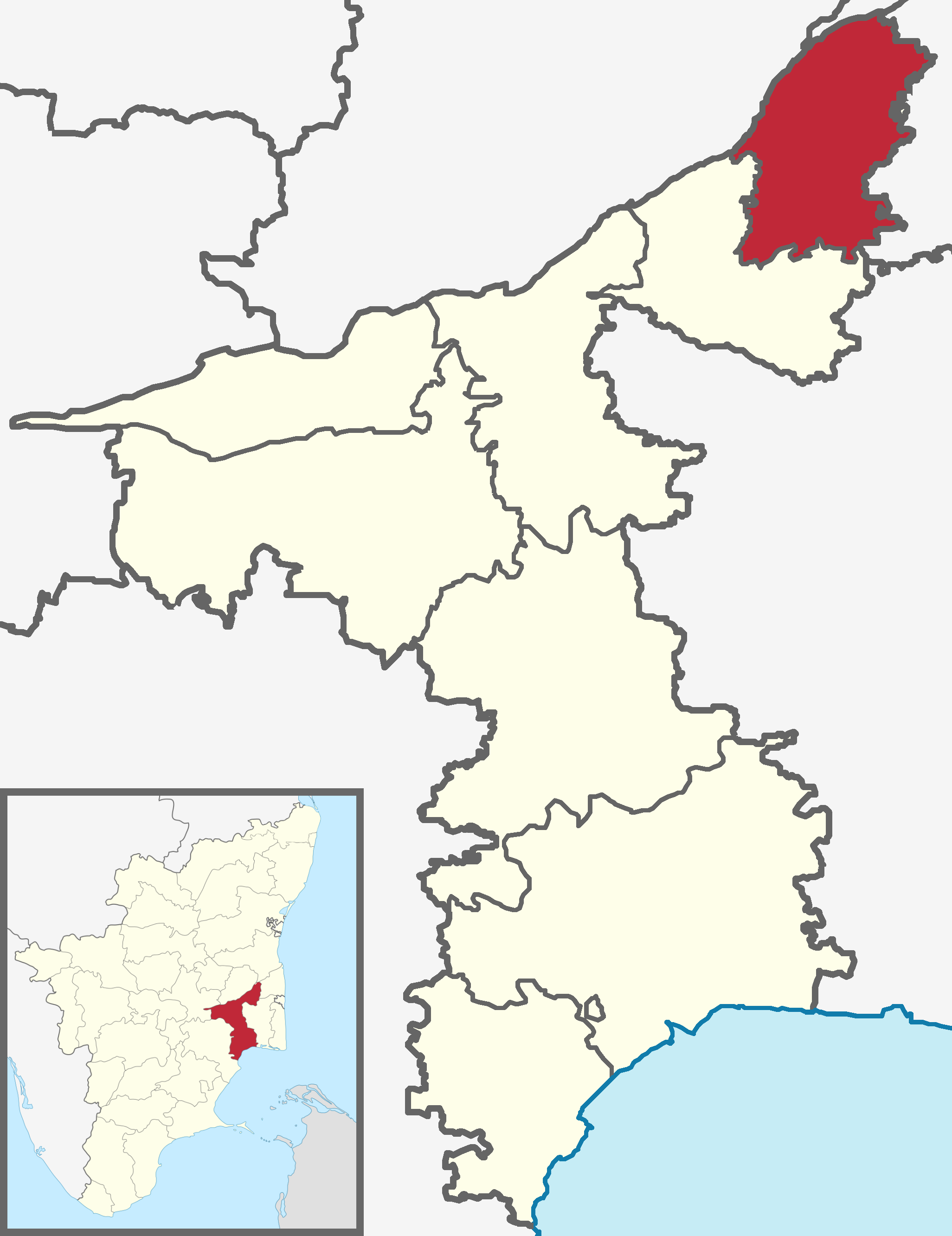

Thiruvidaimarudur taluk (திருவிடைமருதூர் தாலுகா) is a taluk in the Thanjavur district of the Indian state of Tamil Nadu. The headquarters is the town of Thiruvidaimarudur. It is further sub-divided into two revenue blocks: Thiruppanandal and Thiruvidaimarudur.

== Demographics ==
According to the 2011 census, the taluk of Thiruvidaimarudur had a population of 230,843 with 115,253 males and 115,590 females. There were 1003 women for every 1000 men. The taluk had a literacy rate of 75.04. Child population in the age group below 6 was 11,322 Males and 11,053 Females.

== See also ==
- Thepperamanallur
