= List of people from Perm =

Coat of Arms of Perm

This is a list of notable people who were born or have lived in Perm (1940–1957: Molotov), Russia.

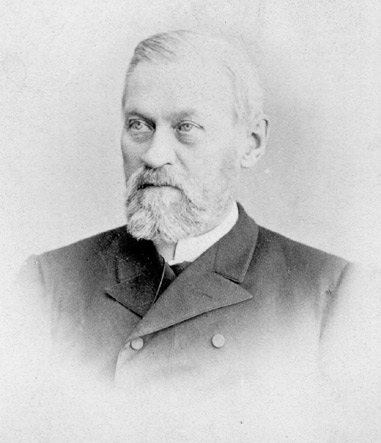
Dmitry Smyshlyayev (1828–1893)

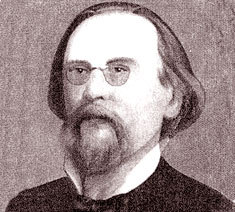
Ivan Larionov (1830–1889)

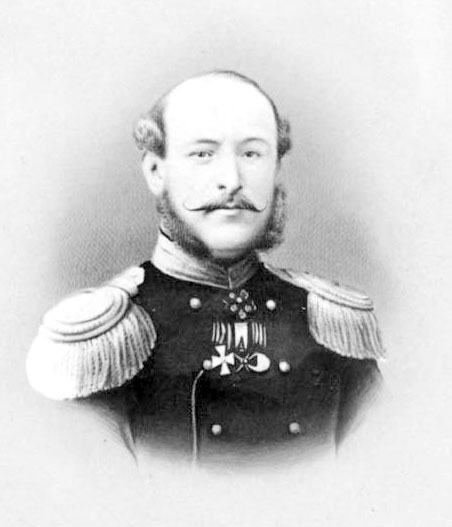
Dmitry Maksutov (1832–1889)

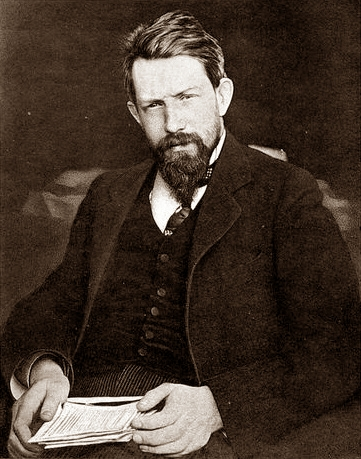
Peter Struve (1870–1944)

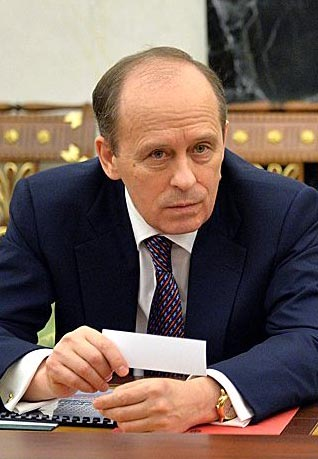
Alexander Bortnikov (born 1951)

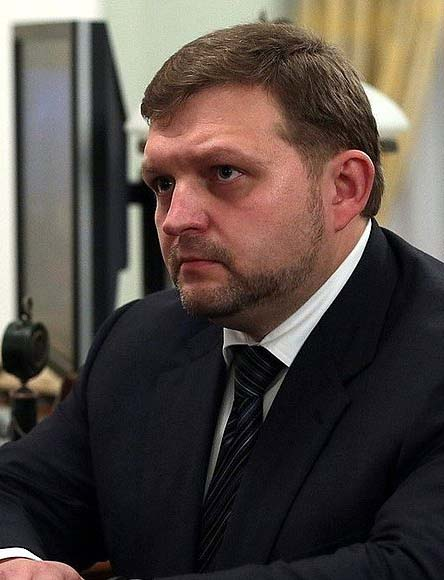
Nikita Belykh (born 1975)

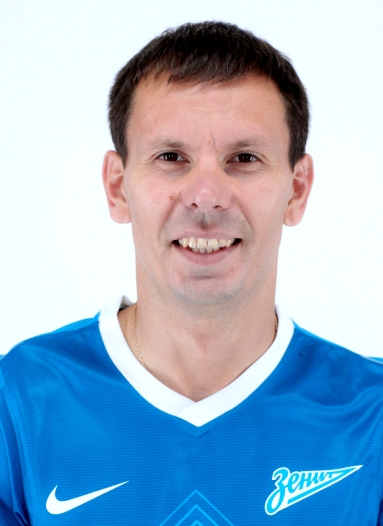
Konstantin Zyryanov (born 1977)

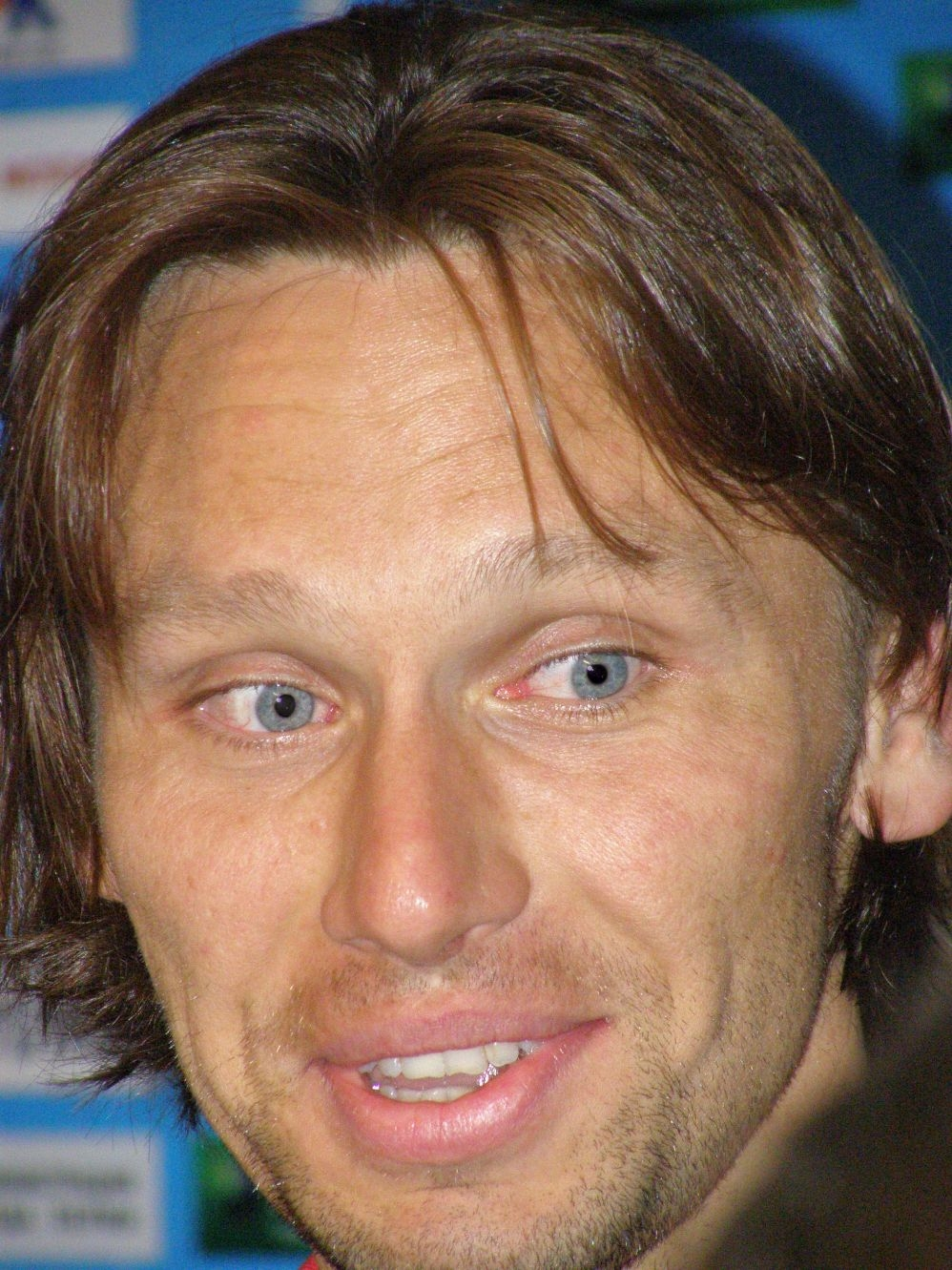
Aleksei Popov (born 1978)

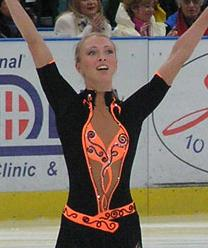
Tatiana Totmianina (born 1981)

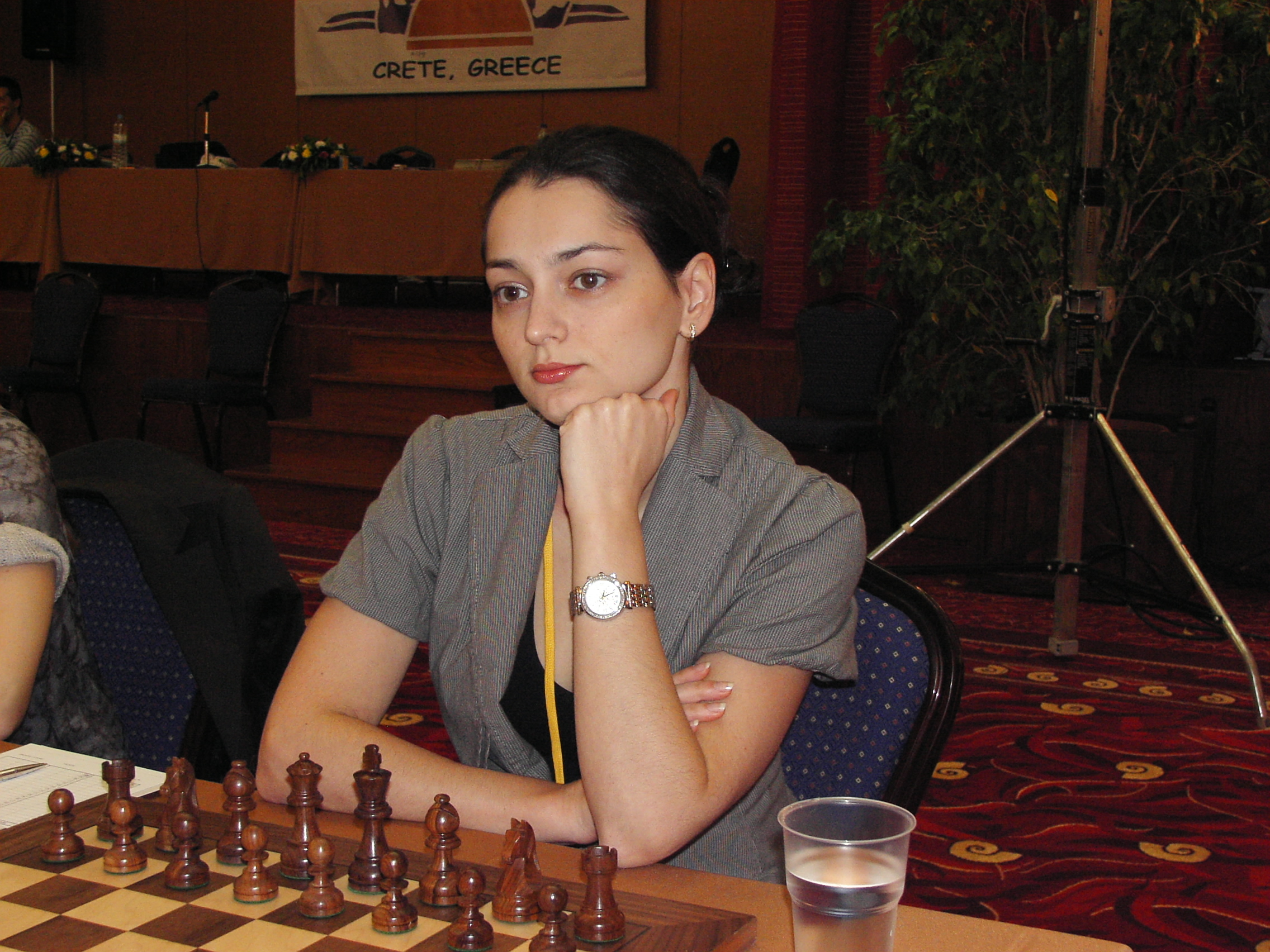
Alexandra Kosteniuk (born 1984)

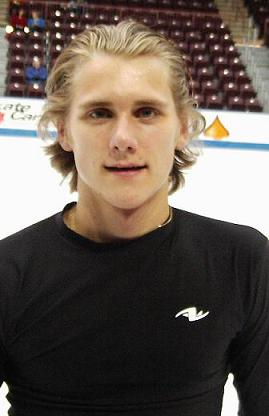
Andrei Griazev (born 1985)

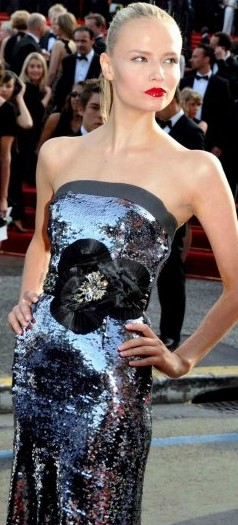
Natasha Poly (born 1985)

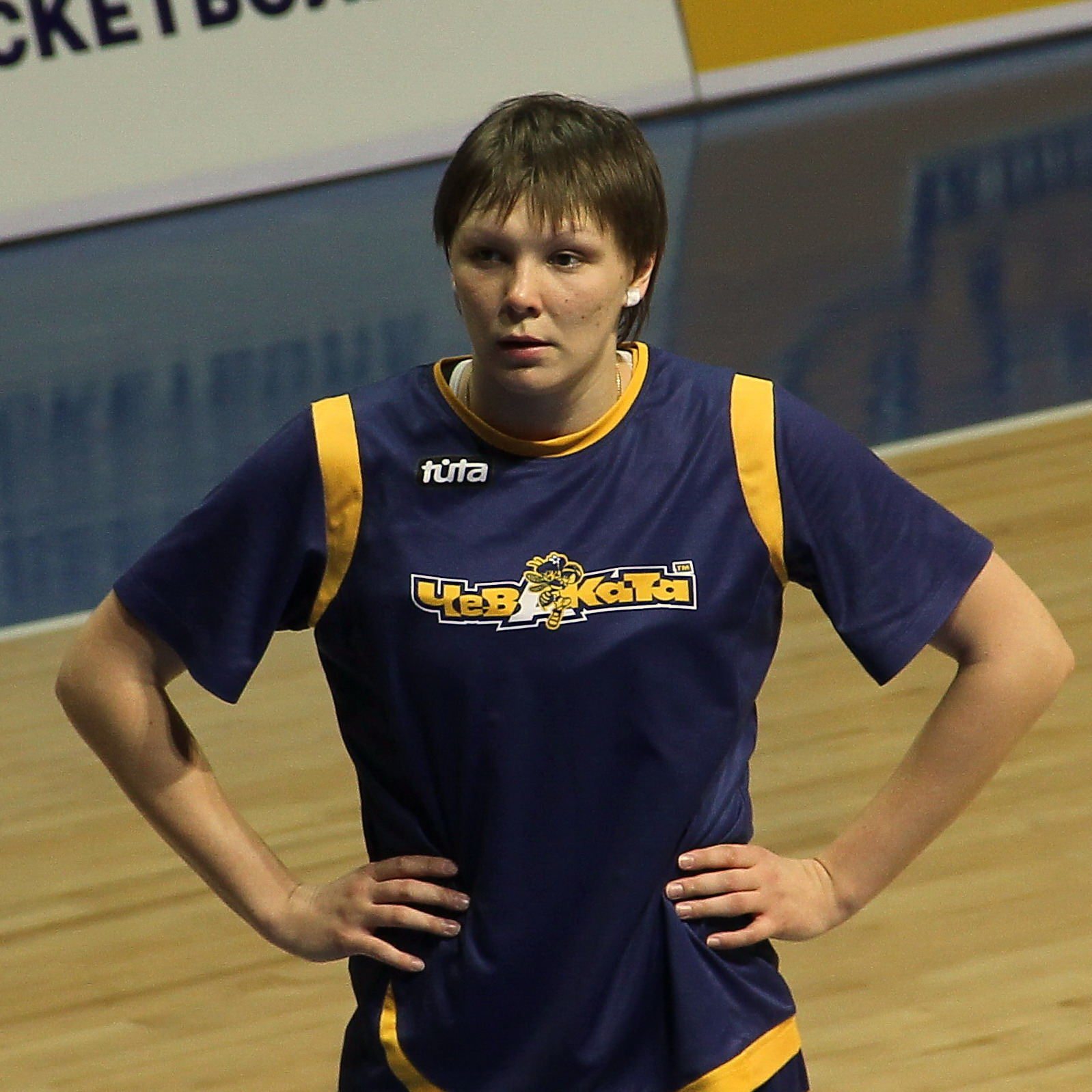
Kristina Alikina (born 1986)

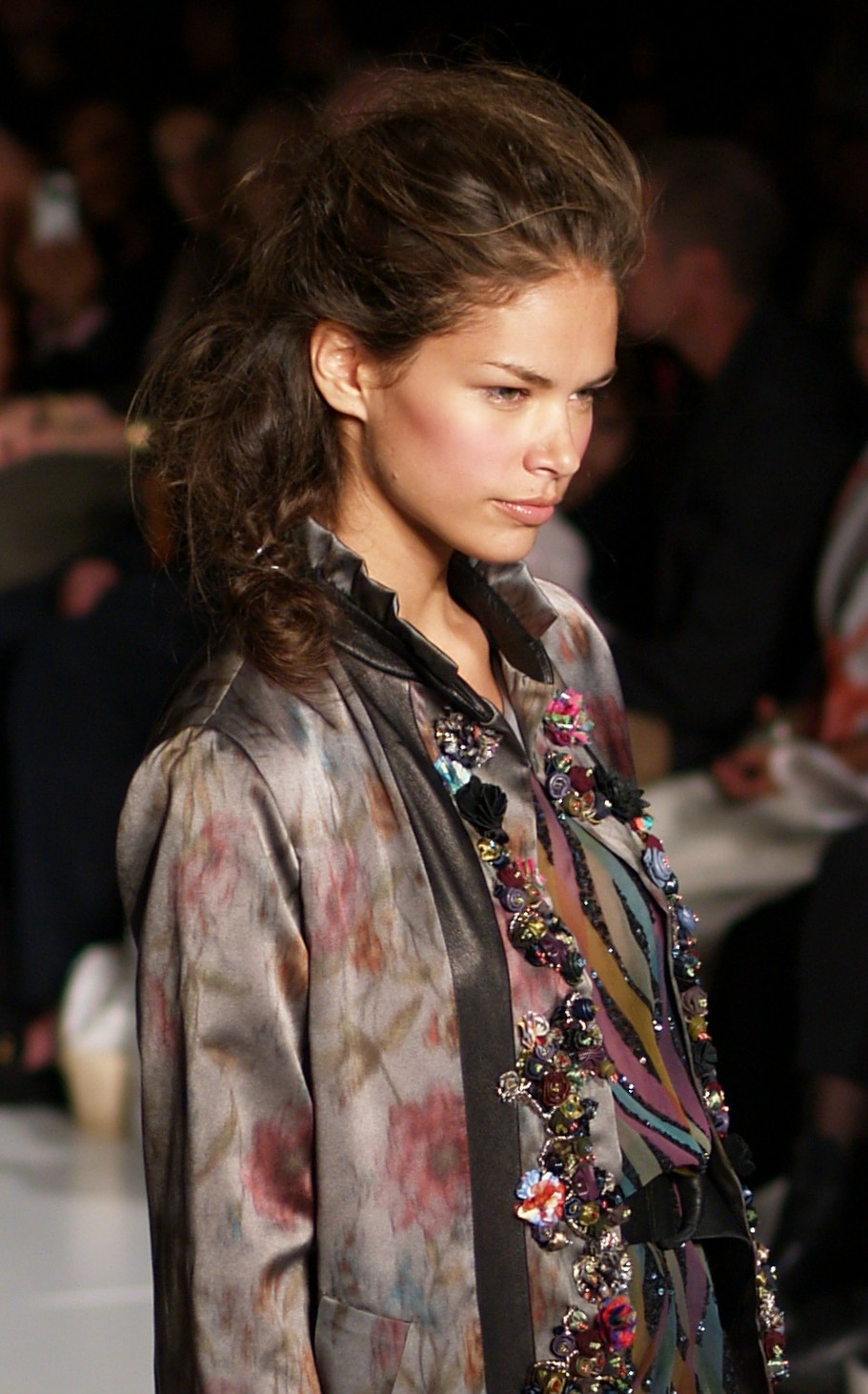
Katya Shchekina (born 1986)

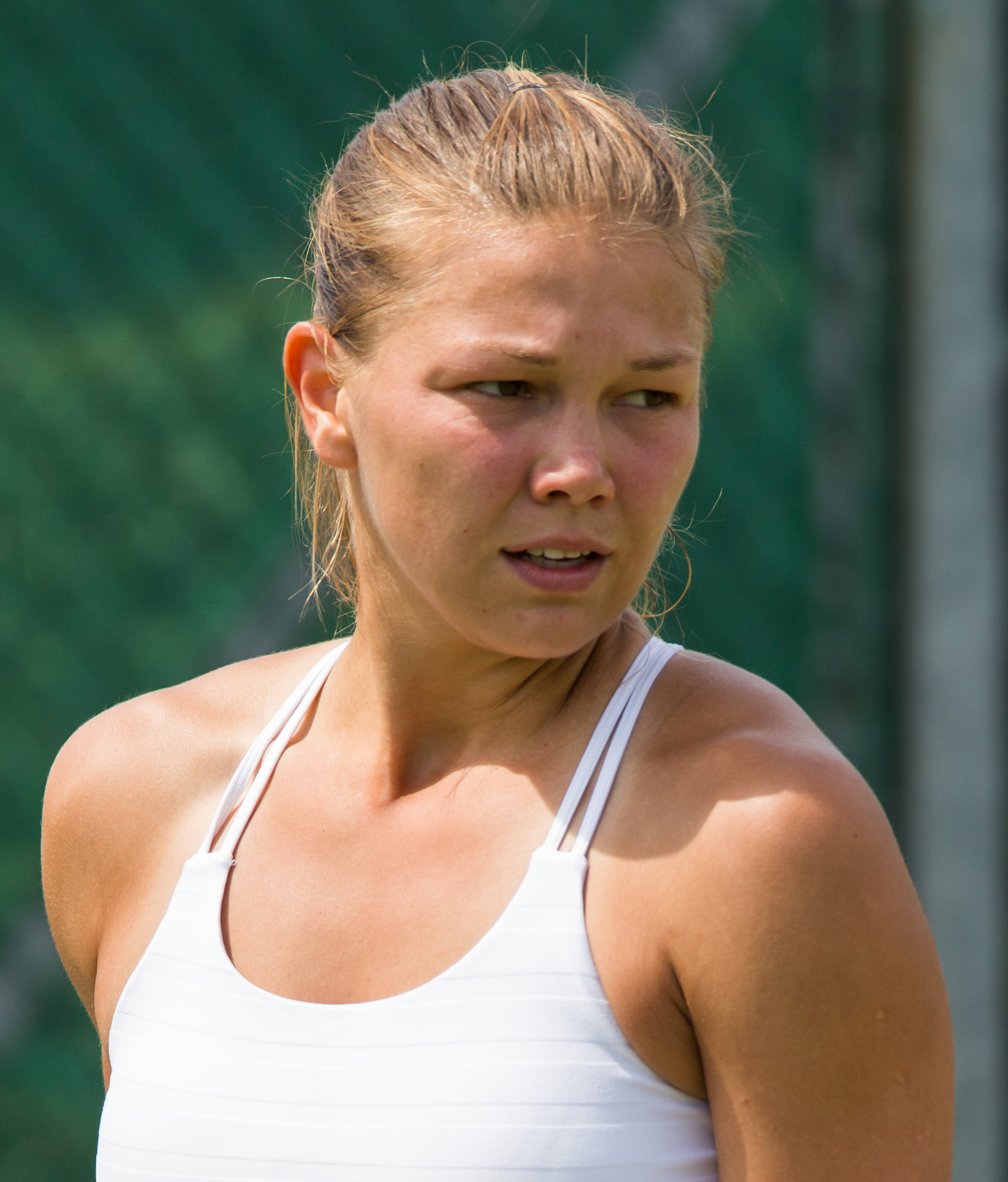
Marina Melnikova (born 1989)

== Born in Perm ==
=== 18th century ===
==== 1701–1800 ====
- Feodor Pryanishnikov (1793–1867), Russian actual privy councillor and postal administrator

=== 19th century ===
==== 1801–1900 ====
- Dmitry Smyshlyayev (1828–1893), Russian historian, ethnographer and politician
- Ivan Larionov (1830–1889), Russian composer, writer and folklorist
- Dmitry Maksutov (1832–1889), Imperial Russian Navy rear-admiral
- Pyotr Vereshchagin (1834–1886), Russian landscape and cityscape painter
- Vasily Vereshchagin (1835–1909), Russian portraitist, history painter and illustrator
- Peter Struve (1870–1944), Russian political economist, philosopher and editor
- Olga Lepeshinskaya (1871–1963), Soviet biologist
- Mikhail Osorgin (1878–1942), Russian writer, journalist, and essayist
- Vasily Kamensky (1884–1961), Russian Futurist poet, playwright and artist
- Ariy Pazovsky (1887–1953), Russian Jewish conductor

=== 20th century ===
==== 1901–1950 ====
- Nikolay Moiseyev (1902–1955), Soviet astronomer and expert in celestial mechanics
- Viktor Oreshnikov (1904–1987), Soviet Russian painter
- Vladimir Yemelyanov (1911–1975), Soviet actor and producer
- Vladislav Zanadvorov (1914–1942), Soviet writer
- Mikhail Schweitzer (1920–2000), Soviet film director
- Lev Voronin (1928–2006), Soviet Russian official
- Lora Yakovleva (1932–2022), Russian woman International Correspondence Chess Grandmaster, the second ICCF Women's World Champion in correspondence chess between 1972 and 1977
- Alexander Bolonkin (1933–2020), Russian-American scientist and academic
- Georgi Burkov (1933–1990), Soviet film actor
- Tamara Erofeyeva (born 1937), Soviet and Russian linguist
- Aleksandr Nossov (born 1942), Soviet Nordic combined skier
- Pavel Sadyrin (1942–2001), Soviet and Russian footballer and manager
- Igor Volgin (born 1942), Soviet and Russian writer and historian, poet, specialist in literature

==== 1951–1960 ====
- Alexander Bortnikov (born 1951), Russian official; Director of the FSB since 2008
- Valentin Stepankov (born 1951), first prosecutor general of the Russian Federation
- Vassily Solomin (1953–1997), Soviet boxer
- Venera Chernyshova (born 1954), Soviet biathlete
- Boris Kondakov (born 1954), Russian specialist in literary criticism, philologist
- Yury Trutnev (born 1956), Russian politician; Minister of Natural Resources and the Environment from 2004 to 2012
- Ludmila Kalinina (born 1957), Russian pair skating coach
- Valentin Yumashev (born 1957), Russian journalist, politician and businessman-developer

==== 1961–1970 ====
- Andrey Vavilov (born 1961), Russian politician and businessman
- Dmitry Fedoseyev (born 1965), Russian football player (1993–1999), coach (1993–1998) and sports functionary (1993–1999)
- Vladimir Filimonov (born 1965), Russian professional football player
- Igor Gindis (born 1965), Russian journalist, rock musician and actor
- Dmitry Rybolovlev (born 1966), Russian businessman, investor and philanthropist
- Vladislav Kormtshikov (born 1967), Russian ski-orienteering competitor and world champion
- Sergey Nagovitsyn (1968–1999), Russian singer, composer and author of Russian chanson style songs
- Dmitri Sergeyev (born 1968), Russian judoka
- Mikhail Zubkov (born 1968), Russian swimmer
- Dmitri Piskunov (born 1969), Russian professional football coach and a former player
- Andrei Smetanin (born 1969), Russian professional footballer
- Sergey Burdin (born 1970), Russian football player
- Vladimir Chagin (born 1970), Russian rally raid driver
- Yuliana Malkhasyants, Russian choreographer
- Tatiana Borodina, Russian opera soprano

==== 1971–1980 ====
- Anna Vodovatova (born 1971), Russian journalist
- Andrei Bryukhanov (born 1972), Russian football player
- Aleksandr Tretyakov (born 1972), Russian wrestler who won bronze medal at the 1996 Summer Olympics
- Alexander Gulyavtsev (born 1973), Russian professional ice hockey winger
- Konstantin Paramonov (born 1973), Russian football coach and a former player
- Yevgeni Yarkov (born 1973), Russian football player
- Nikita Belykh (born 1975), Russian politician; Governor of Kirov Oblast since 2009
- Rinat Farkhoutdinov (born 1975), Russian ice dancer
- Tatyana Tomashova (born 1975), Russian middle distance runner
- Sergey Armishev (born 1976), Russian football player
- Nikolai Bardin (born 1976), Russian professional ice hockey winger
- Michael Beilin (born 1976), Israeli Olympic Greco-Roman wrestler
- Natalia Tomilova (born 1977), Russian ski-orienteering competitor
- Andrei Tsaplin (born 1977), Russian professional footballer
- Konstantin Zyryanov (born 1977), Russian footballer
- Konstantin Chaschukhin (born 1978), Russian professional ice hockey goaltender
- Aleksei Popov (born 1978), Russian-born Kazakhstani footballer
- Grigori Petrovski (born 1979), Russian pair skater
- Aleksandr Pitchkounov (born 1979), Russian super heavyweight kickboxer and kyokushin karateka competing in K-1
- Yekaterina Shipulina (born 1979), Russian prima ballerina of the Bolshoi Ballet
- Vitali Koval (born 1980), Belarusian professional ice hockey goaltender
- Dmitri Polyanin (born 1980), Russian professional football player
- Alexander Zevakhin (born 1980), Russian professional ice hockey right winger

==== 1981–1985 ====
- Alexander Chagodayev (born 1981), Russian professional ice hockey forward
- Natalya Korostelyova (born 1981), Russian cross country skier
- Mikhail Kuleshov (born 1981), Russian ice hockey player
- Viktor Polyakov (born 1981), Ukrainian boxer of Russian ethnicity
- Viktoria Shliakhova (born 1981), Russian pair skater
- Tatiana Totmianina (born 1981), Russian pair skater
- Tatyana Veshkurova (born 1981), Russian sprint athlete
- DJ Smash (born 1982), Russian DJ in house music and electronic music
- Ilya Solaryov (born 1982), Kazakhstani professional ice hockey winger of Russian ethnicity
- Vyacheslav Belov (born 1983), Russian professional ice hockey defenceman
- Maxim Trankov (born 1983), Russian pair skater
- Pavel Alikin (born 1984), Russian professional footballer
- Alexandra Kosteniuk (born 1984), Russian chess Grandmaster and a former Women's World Chess Champion
- Evgeniy Pechenin (born 1984), Russian cross-country mountain biker
- Alexander Popov (born 1984), Russian former pair skater
- Andrei Griazev (born 1985), Russian figure skater
- Dmitri Megalinsky (born 1985), Russian professional ice hockey defenceman
- Alexander Nikulin (born 1985), Russian professional ice hockey player
- Natasha Poly (born 1985), Russian model
- Yevgeni Shipitsin (born 1985), Russian professional football player
- Katerina Shpitsa (born 1985), Russian actress of theater and cinema

==== 1986–1990 ====
- Kristina Alikina (born 1986), Russian basketball power forward
- Alexander Berkutov (born 1986), Russian professional ice hockey defenceman
- Olga Golovkina (born 1986), Russian athlete
- Nikolay Morilov (born 1986), Russian cross country skier
- Igor Polygalov (born 1986), Russian professional ice hockey forward
- Katya Shchekina (born 1986), Russian model
- Ilia Tkachenko (born 1986), Russian ice dancer
- Vitali Butikov (born 1987), Russian ice dancer
- Maksim Dyldin (born 1987), Russian sprint athlete
- Denis Kazionov (born 1987), Russian professional ice hockey winger
- Mariya Panfilova (born 1987), Russian (2007–2012), Ukrainian (2013–2014) and Belarusian (since 2015) biathlete
- Konstantin Bezmaternikh (born 1988), Russian pair skater
- Marina Mokhnatkina (born 1988), Russian mixed martial artist and sambo competitor
- Natalia Shestakova (born 1988), Russian pair skater
- Artem Borodulin (born 1989), Russian figure skater
- Marina Melnikova (born 1989), Russian tennis player
- Andrei Novoselov (born 1989), Russian pair skater
- Ekaterina Rybolovleva (born 1989), Russian businesswoman, equestrian and socialite
- Andrei Sekretov (born 1989), Russian professional football player
- Arina Ushakova (born 1989), Russian retired pair skater
- Ildar Khairullin (born 1990), Russian chess Grandmaster

==== 1991–2000 ====
- Liana Churilova (born 1991), Russian-American professional ballroom dancer
- Elena Komendrovskaja (born 1991), Russian female badminton player
- Aleksandr Subbotin (born 1991), Russian professional football player
- Maksim Batov (born 1992), Russian football defender
- Oleg Ponomarev (born 1992), Russian Paralympic Nordic skier
- Yevgeni Tyukalov (born 1992), Russian professional football player
- Sergei Abramov (born 1993), Russian ice hockey player
- Lubov Bakirova (born 1993), Russian pair skater
- Sabina Imaikina (born 1993), Russian pair skater
- Tanya Mityushina (born 1993), Russian fashion model
- Evgeni Klimov (born 1994), Russian Nordic combined skier
- Vasili Aleynikov (born 1995), Russian football player
- Anatoly Golyshev (born 1995), Russian ice hockey forward
- Anastasia Martiusheva (born 1995), Russian pair skater
- Tatiana Tudvaseva (born 1997), Russian pair skater
- Ivan Ivanchenko (born 1998), Russian football player
- Maria Vigalova (born 1999), Russian pair skater

== Lived in Perm ==
- Vasily Tatishchev (1686–1750), Russian statesman and ethnographer; founded the cities of Perm and Yekaterinburg
- Andrey Voronikhin (1759–1814), Russian architect and painter
- Alexander von Humboldt (1769–1859), Prussian geographer, naturalist and explorer
- Mikhail Speransky (1772–1839), Russian reformist during the reign of Alexander I of Russia
- Alexander Herzen (1812–1870), Russian writer and thinker
- Dmitry Mamin-Sibiryak (1852–1912), Russian author
- Vladimir Korolenko (1853–1921), Russian short story writer, journalist, human rights activist and humanitarian
- Nikolay Slavyanov (1854–1897), Russian inventor
- Alexander Popov (1859–1906), Russian physicist who is acclaimed in his homeland and eastern European countries as the inventor of radio
- Andronik (Nikolsky) (1870–1918), bishop in the Russian Orthodox Church and a saint
- Sergei Diaghilev (1872–1929), Russian art critic, patron, ballet impresario and founder of the Ballets Russes
- Mikhail Shuisky (1883–1953), Russian (people) opera and concert singer
- Boris Pasternak (1890–1960), Soviet and Russian poet, novelist and literary translator; lived in Perm for a time, and it figures in his novel Doctor Zhivago under the fictional name "Yuriatin" where Yuri sees Lara again in the public library
- Arkadiy Shvetsov (1892–1953), Soviet aircraft engine designer
- Margarita Kozhina (1925–2012), Soviet and Russian linguist
- Sergei Toropov (1928–1990), Russian historian and regional ethnographer
- Sergei Belov (1944–2013), Soviet professional basketball player
- Gennady Troshev (1947–2008), Russian Colonel General in the Russian military
- Pyotr Latyshev (1948–2008), Russian politician
- Nikolai Zarubin (1948–1998), Russian artist
- Alexei Ivanov (born 1969), Russian writer

== See also ==
- List of Russian people
- List of Russian-language poets
