= Zarubin =

Zarubin (Russian: Зарубин) is a Russian masculine surname originating from the noun zarub meaning a notch in a tree; its feminine counterpart is Zarubina. The surname may refer to the following notable people:

- Elizabeth Zarubina (1900–1987), Soviet spy, wife of Vasily
- Georgy Zarubin (1900–1958), Soviet diplomat
- Irina Zarubina (1907–1976), Soviet theater and film actress
- Ivan Zarubin (1887–1964), Russian linguist
- Nikolai Zarubin (1948–1998), artist
- Roman Zarubin (born 1976), canoe racer
- Ruslan Zarubin (born 1983), Ukrainian football player
- Vasily Zarubin (1894–1972), Soviet intelligence officer
- Viktor Ivanovich Zarubin (1866–1928), Russian painter
