= Yegoshikha Cemetery =

Cemetery in Perm, Russia

Coordinates: 58°00′45″N 56°16′11″E

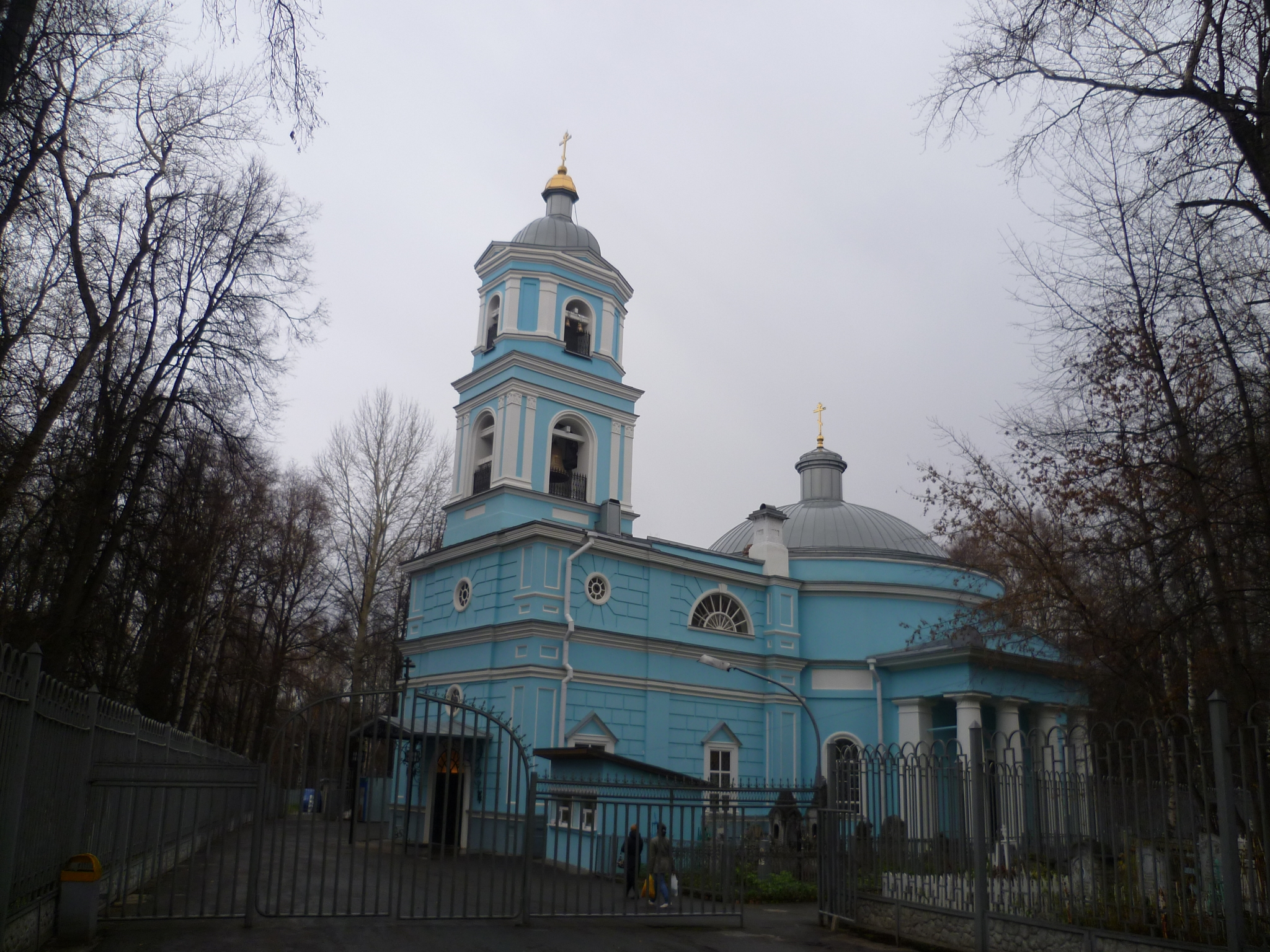
The Church of All Saints, 2011

Yegoshikha Cemetery (Russian: Егошихинское кладбище, romanized: Yegoshikhinskoye kladbishche) is the principal cemetery of the Russian city of Perm. It takes its name from the Yegoshikha River which borders it and was founded in the second half of the 18th century.

In 1784, the governor of Perm and Tobolsk, Eugene Kashkin, ordered the construction of a church for burying the dead. Near the first church at the cemetery, two more were built later: the Church of All Saints and the Church of the Assumption of the Virgin.

In the 1930s, executed political prisoners used to be buried in the cemetery. In 1996, the Perm branch of Memorial erected a monument to the victims of the Great Purge. The installation of the monument was sponsored by donations from Perm residents and the city and regional administrations.

== Notable graves ==
- Józef Piotrowski (1840–1923), participant in the January Uprising and an enlightener
- Mikhail Shuisky (1883–1953), opera singer
- Dmitry Dmitriyevich Smyshlyayev (1828–1893), historian, ethnographer and politician
- Pyotr Subbotin-Permyak (1886–1923), avant-garde painter
- Sergei Safronov (fighter pilot) (1930–1960), Soviet fighter pilot
