= Mark Kopytman =

Mark Kopytman (Hebrew: מרק קופיטמן; December 6, 1929 – December 16, 2011) was a composer, musicologist and pedagogue. He was a professor and a rector of the Rubin Academy (Jerusalem Academy of Music and Dance), and a Laureate of the Serge Koussevitzky Prize for his composition Voices of Memory (1986). Kopytman was awarded the title "People's Artist of Moldova" in 1992 by the Moldovan President for the creation of the first Moldovan national opera, Casa mare ("The Great House").

== Early life and education ==
Kopytman was born in Kamianets-Podilskyi in Ukraine (then part of the Soviet Union) in 1929. He received his initial training in piano and music theory at Chernivtsi Music College and later went on to study medicine at the Chernivtsi Medical Institute. After graduating from medical college, Kopytman studied composition with Roman Simovych at the Lysenko Academy of Music in Lviv and with S. Bogatirev at Tchaikovsky State Conservatory in Moscow. After gaining his second PhD in theory and composition, Kopytman taught at the conservatories of Moscow, Almaty and Chişinău. Several of his compositions won prizes and distinctions in competitions and festivals.

== Emigration ==
In 1972 Kopytman emigrated to Israel, where he became a Professor of Composition at the Rubin Academy of Music and Dance in Jerusalem. Kopytman eventually served as Chairman of the Theory and Composition Department, and later as Dean and the Deputy Head of the Academy (1974-1994).

In 1979, Kopytman was invited to teach as a permanent guest professor at Hebrew University of Jerusalem. He led seminars and master classes in composition, especially in heterophony, at universities and music schools throughout Europe and the United States.

== Compositions ==
Kopytman's individual style is inspired by Jewish folklore and combined with economical use of recent innovations and characterized by a strong accent on melodic lines in the web of heterophonic splitting of textures.

His orchestral and chamber compositions have been performed at many festivals across the world.

== Awards ==
Kopytman is recipient of several prizes; among them the prestigious Koussevitzky International Record Critics award for his orchestral work Memory (1986), the Israel ACUM Prize for lifetime achievement (1992), and the Israel Prime Minister Prize (2002).

== Selected works ==
Stage

- Casa Mare, opera in 2 acts (1966); libretto by Victor Teleucă after a drama by Ion Druță
- Monodrama, ballet music for clarinet, bassoon, 3 celli, percussion, harpsichord and piano (1975)
- Prism, ballet music for trombone and percussion (1976)
- Two Poems, ballet music for flute, violin, cello and piano (1978)
- And a Time for Every Purpose, ballet music for flute, trumpet, trombone and percussion (1979)
- Wings, music for drama (1979)
- Chamber Scenes from the Life of Süsskind von Trimberg, chamber opera (1982); libretto by Recha Freier

Orchestral

- Symphony (1956)
- Sinfonietta for chamber orchestra (1964)
- Six Moldavian Tunes (1965)
- Concerto for Orchestra (1976)
- Casa Mare, Suite I from the Opera (1980)
- Memory (1981)
- Music for Strings (1988)
- Cantus II for string orchestra (1990)
- Beyond All This for chamber orchestra (1997)
- Vanished Strains (2004)

Concertante

- Concertino for violin and chamber orchestra (1964)
- Concerto for piano and orchestra (1970)
- Kaddish for cello or viola and string orchestra (1981)
- Cantus III for bass clarinet and chamber orchestra (1984)
- Cantus V, Concerto for viola and orchestra (1990)
- Cantus VI for oboe and chamber orchestra (1995) or for clarinet and orchestra (2002)
- Cantus IV for violin and string orchestra (dedication, 2000) or for violin and chamber orchestra (dedication, 2003)
- Cantus VII for violin, cello and orchestra (2000)

Chamber and instrumental

- 2 Little Suites (1962, 1965)
- Pieces for oboe and piano (1966)
- String Quartet No. 1, Two Miniatures on Folk Tunes (1962)
- String Quartet No. 2 (1966)
- String Quartet No. 3 (1969)
- Lamentation for flute (1973)
- For Percussion (1975)
- For Harpsichord (1976)
- For Harp (1976)
- About an old Tune for violin, viola, cello and piano (1977)
- For Organ (1978)
- Cantus I for 3 oboes (1979)
- Cantus II for violin, viola and cello (1980)
- Dedication for violin or viola (1986)
- Ornaments I for 2 clarinets (1991)
- Chamber Music for clarinet and piano (1992)
- Kaddish for cello or viola and piano (1992)
- Tenero for cello (1993)
- Ornaments II for 2 bassoons (1993)
- Discourse I-II (Cantis VI) for oboe and string quartet (1994)
- Strain for string quartet (1995)
- Misterioso-Sussurando for cello (1998)
- Passolargo for guitar (1999)
- String Quartet No.4 "Eight Chapters" (2000)
- Music for Nine for string quartet and woodwind quartet (2001)
- Ornaments III for flute (2001)
- Farewell for string quartet (2001)
- Cantus II for string quartet (2003)
- Cantus IV for violin and piano (dedication, 2004)
- Cantus IV for viola solo (dedication, 1995)

Piano

- Polyphonic Pieces (1962–85)
- For Piano (1973)
- Basso Recitativo for 2 pianos (1977)
- Variable Structures, 12 Short Preludes (1985–87)
- Alliterations (1993)
- For Gregory, 3 Miniatures (2000)
- Bucolics, 5 Little Pieces for Children (2002)

Choral

- Distance beyond Distance, 10 Poems for mixed chorus (1960); text by Alexander Twardovsky (Russian)
- Forty Years for mixed chorus (1964); text by Victor Teleuke (Moldavian)
- Songs of Forest, Oratorio for soloists, chorus and orchestra (1965); text by Victor Teleuke (Moldavian)
- Water-colors for female chorus (1965); text by Nikolai Rilenkov (Russian)
- 10 Moldavian Folk Songs, Arrangements for mixed chorus (1966-1972)
- Stones for mixed chorus (1980); text from Quotations (English)
- Who Lights Up? for children's chorus (1987); text by Amir Gilboa
- Scattered Rhymes for mixed chorus and chamber orchestra (1988); text by Yehuda Amichai (Hebrew)
- Love Remembered for mixed chorus and chamber orchestra (1989); text by Yehuda Amichai (Hebrew)

Vocal

- Songs of Captivity and Struggle for baritone and piano (1957); text by Nikolas Gilien (Russian)
- Children's Songs for voice or children's/women's chorus (1959-1964)
- Songs of Anguished Love for voice and piano (1964); text by Silvia Kaputikjan (Russian)
- Unfinished Lines for baritone and orchestra (1969); text by Mirza Gelovani, Vladislav Zanadvorov, Chazai Kaloev, Nikolai Majorov (Russian)
- Soare cu Dinitz for voice and piano (1972); text by Michai Chiubotaru (Moldavian)
- October Sun for voice, flute, violin, piano and percussion (1974); text by Yehuda Amicahai (Hebrew)
- This Is a Gate without Wall for voice, clarinet, bassoon, violin, cello, percussion and piano (1975); text by Yehuda Amichai (Hebrew)
- Voices for voice, flute, 4 trombones and string orchestra (1975)
- Day and Night Arise to Heaven for voice, flute, trumpet and percussion (1977); text by Immanuel of Rome (Hebrew)
- Rotations for voice and orchestra (1979)
- Circles (Life of the World to Come) for voice, clarinet, cello and piano (1986); text by Abraham Abulafia (English)
- Letters of Creation for voice and string orchestra (1987); text from ancient Jewish poetry
- Letters of Creation for voice and piano (1988); text from ancient Jewish poetry (English)
- Eight Pages for solo voice (1989); text by Edmond Jabes (English)
- To Go Away for voice, clarinet, violin, cello and percussion (1989); text by Jonathan Ratosh (Hebrew)
- Soare cu Dinitz for voice and orchestra (1994); text by Michai Chiubotaru (Moldavian)
- Vocalise for voice and oboe (1995)
- Three Nights for voice and ensemble (1996); text by David Vogel (English)
- From Jewish Poetry for voice and chamber orchestra (1996); text by Edmond Jabes and from ancient Jewish poetry (English)
- Fermane for folk singer and 3 clarinets (1998)
- Casa Mare, Suite II from the Opera for mezzo-soprano, baritone and orchestra (1999)
- If There Are Seven Heavens, 12 Miniatures for voice and cello (2001); text by Edmond Jabes (English)
