= Alikin =

Alikin (Russian: Аликин) is a Russian masculine surname, its feminine counterpart is Alikina. It may refer to

- Pavel Alikin (born 1984), Russian football player
- Kristina Alikina (born 1986), Russian basketball player
- Vladimir Alikin (born 1957), Soviet biathlete
