= Vyacheslav Belov =

Vyacheslav Belov may refer to:

- Vyacheslav Belov (pentathlete) (1938–2010), Soviet modern pentathlon competitor
- Vyacheslav Belov (ice hockey) (born 1983), Russian ice hockey defenceman
