= Berkutov =

Berkutov (Russian: Беркутов) is a Russian masculine surname, its feminine counterpart is Berkutova. Notable people with the surname include:

- Alexander Berkutov (born 1986), Russian ice hockey defenceman
- Aleksandr Berkutov (1933–2012), Russian rower
