= Sheila Reid (athlete) =

Canadian track and field athlete

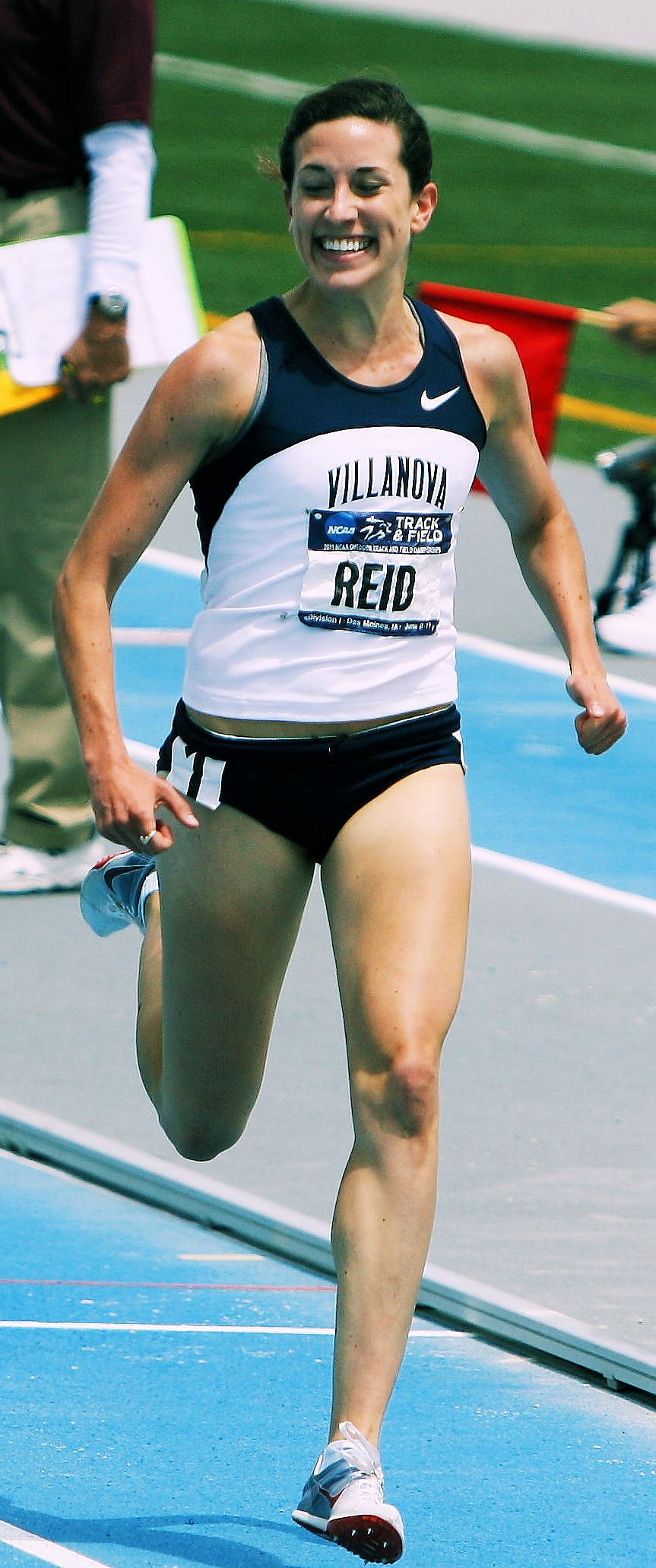
- Sheila Reid winning the 1500 m at the 2011 NCAA Women's Outdoor Track and Field Championship

Personal information
- National team: 2012 Olympics, 2013 World Championships, 2017 World Championships
- Born: August 2, 1989 (age 36) Toronto, Ontario
- Height: 5 ft 6 in (1.68 m)
- Weight: 115 lb (52 kg)

Sport
- Country: Canada
- Events: 1500 m, 5000 m, Cross country
- College team: Villanova Wildcats
- Turned pro: 2012
- Coached by: Mark Rowland

Sheila Reid (born August 2, 1989) is a Canadian track and field Olympian who competes in cross country, middle and long-distance running events. She competed collegiately at Villanova University. Reid won the 2010 and 2011 NCAA Women's Cross Country Championship, and in June 2011 became the first woman to win the 5000 m and the 1500 m at the NCAA Women's Outdoor Track and Field Championship. She won the Honda Sports Award as the nation's top female cross country runner in 2011, repeated as the best female cross country runner in 2012, and also won the Honda Sports Award for Track and field in 2012.

She competed in the 5000 m in Athletics at the 2012 Summer Olympics, and in the 1500 m at the 2013 World Championships in Athletics. Early in her professional career she worked as a volunteer assistant at Villanova University, and then went on to join Oregon Track Club Elite in May 2014.

== Running career ==
=== Professional ===
==== 2012 ====
In July 2012, Reid was named to the 2012 Canadian Summer Olympic Team. She competed in the 5000 m race, in which she placed 15th in her heat and 28th overall in the qualification heats.

==== 2013 ====
In 2013, she competed in the 1500 m at the 2013 World Championships in Athletics, falling a bit short of her expectations.

==== 2017 ====
On May 18, 2017, after being injured for some time, Reid made an astonishing comeback in the 1500m establishing a World Championships qualifying time of 4:07.07 while placing first at the USATF Distance Classic in San Francisco, CA. Prelude to her 2017 milestone qualification was her 4:10.40 winning performance at the Oregon Twilight on May 5. Continuing on a solid trajectory for the year, Reid placed second in 4:12.91 at the 2017 Canadian Track and Field Championships to qualify for the 2017 World Championships in London. At the 2017 World Championships in London on August 4, Reid was unable to advance to the 1500 m semi-finals after placing 12th in the preliminary heats in a time of 4:13.12.

== Personal bests ==
=== Overall ===
Surface	Event	Result	Venue	Date
Outdoor	1500m	4:02.96	Eugene, OR	01 JUN 2013
Outdoor	3000m	8:44.02	London (OP)	26 JUL 2013
Outdoor	5000m	15:23.64	Walnut, CA	20 APR 2012
Indoor	1000m	2:44.39	New York (Armory), NY	16 JAN 2010
Indoor	1500m	4:18.27	Eugene, OR	22 JAN 2016
Indoor	1 Mile	4:27.02	New York (Armory), NY	16 FEB 2013
Indoor	3000m	8:56.50	New York (Armory), NY	06 FEB 2016
Indoor	2 Miles	9:37.97	Boston (Roxbury), MA	02 FEB 2013

=== 2013 best achievements ===
Surface	Event	Result	Venue	Date
Indoor	2 Miles	9:37.97	Boston, MA (USA)	02.02.2013
Indoor	1 Mile	4:27.02	New York, NY (USA)	16.02.2013
Outdoor	800m	2:04.60	Walnut, CA (USA)	20.04.2013
Outdoor	1500m	4:02.96	Eugene, OR (USA)	01.06.2013
Outdoor	3000m	8:44.02	London (GBR)	26.07.2013

=== 2015 best achievements ===
Surface	Event	Result	Venue	Date
Outdoor	1500m	4:06.97	Padova (ITA)	06.09.2015
Outdoor	1 Mile	4:37.46	Philadelphia (USA)	25.04.2015

=== 2016 best achievements ===
Surface	Event	Result	Venue	Date
Indoor	1500m	4:18.27	Portland, OR (USA)	22.01.2016
Indoor	Mile	4:27.57	Boston (Boston University), MA (USA)	28.02.2016
Indoor	3000m	8:56.50	New York, NY (USA)	06.02.2016
Outdoor	1500m	4:03.96	Eugene, OR (USA)	28.05.2016
