= Athletics at the 2012 Summer Olympics – Women's 5000 metres =

Women's 5000 metres at the Games of the XXX Olympiad
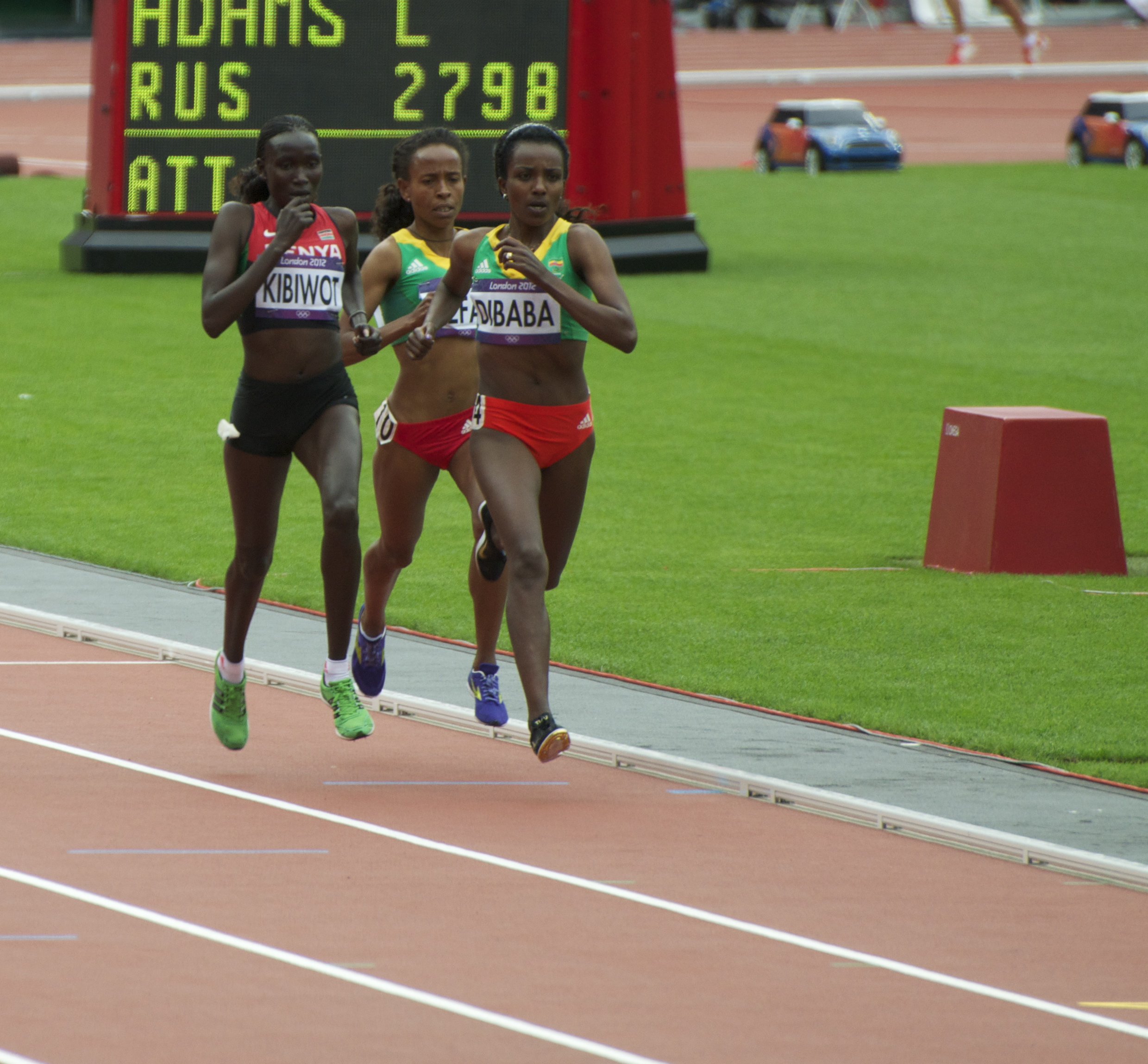
- Venue: Olympic Stadium
- Date: Aug 7 (prelim), Aug 10 (final)
- Competitors: 36 from 22 nations
- Winning time: 15:04.25

Medalists
1st place, gold medalist(s)		Meseret Defar	Ethiopia
2nd place, silver medalist(s)		Vivian Cheruiyot	Kenya
3rd place, bronze medalist(s)		Tirunesh Dibaba	Ethiopia

Official Video

The Women's 5000 metres competition at the 2012 Summer Olympics in London, United Kingdom. The event final was held at the Olympic Stadium on 10 of August.

From the start of the final Joanne Pavey took the lead, with Dibaba moving into the fourth position in the procession, ready to cover any moves. After about four laps Elena Romagnolo took up the front position for a few laps, to be replaced again with Pavey. At the 3K mark, Julia Bleasdale moved in behind her teammate, but in the next 200 metres, Dibaba decided it was time to take up the lead. The pace accelerated markedly, with the Ethiopian and Kenyan teams coming to the front and the others falling off the back. Viola Jelagat Kibiwot was the last to pay attention, sprinting along the outside to catch the group of leaders. Bleasdale was the last to stay with that group of six, who had achieved separation with 600 to go, Dibaba and Meseret Defar, led Kibiwot and Vivian Cheruiyot with the pace steadily increasing. With 200 to go, Cheruiyot moved into third, Kibiwot losing ground. Coming off the turn Defar moved onto Dibaba's shoulder, followed by Cheruiyot. Coming around the outside, Defar passed Dibaba, with Dibaba unable to change pace. 3 metres behind, Cheruiyot followed Defar to the line.

== Competition format ==
The Women's 5000m competition consisted of heats (Round 1) and a Final. The fastest competitors from each race in the heats qualified for the Final along with the fastest overall competitors not already qualified that were required to fill the eight spaces in the Final.

== Records ==
Prior to the competition, the existing World and Olympic records were as follows.

World record	Tirunesh Dibaba (ETH)	14:11.15	Oslo, Norway	6 June 2008
Olympic record	Gabriela Szabo (ROU)	14:40.79	Sydney, Australia	25 September 2000
2012 World leading	Vivian Cheruiyot (KEN)	14:35.62	Rome, Italy	31 May 2012

== Schedule ==
All times are British Summer Time (UTC+1)

Date	Time	Round
Tuesday, 7 August 2012	10:55	Round 1
Friday, 10 August 2012	20:05	Finals

== Results ==
Official Video of Round 1

=== Heats ===
Qual. rule: first 5 of each heat (Q) plus the 5 fastest times (q) qualified.

==== Heat 1 ====
Rank	Athlete	Nation	Time	Notes
1	Tirunesh Dibaba	Ethiopia	14:58.48	Q
2	Meseret Defar	Ethiopia	14:58.70	Q
3	Viola Kibiwot	Kenya	14:59.31	Q
4	Olga Golovkina	Russia	15:05.26	Q, PB
5	Julie Culley	United States	15:05.38	Q, PB
6	Tejitu Daba	Bahrain	15:05.59	q, PB
7	Silvia Weissteiner	Italy	15:06.81	SB
8	Kayoko Fukushi	Japan	15:09.31	SB
9	Barbara Parker	Great Britain	15:12.81	PB
10	Fionnuala Britton	Ireland	15:12.97	PB
11	Lyudmyla Kovalenko	Ukraine	15:18.60	
12	Judith Plá	Spain	15:20.39	PB
13	Karoline Bjerkeli Grøvdal	Norway	15:24.86	PB
14	Dudu Karakaya	Turkey	15:28.32	
15	Eloise Wellings	Australia	15:35.53	
16	Sandra López	Mexico	15:55.16	
-	Nadia Noujani	Morocco	DNF	
-	Sara Moreira	Portugal	DNS	

==== Heat 2 ====
Rank	Athlete	Nation	Time	Notes
1	Gelete Burka	Ethiopia	15:01.44	Q
2	Vivian Cheruiyot	Kenya	15:01.54	Q
3	Sally Kipyego	Kenya	15:01.87	Q
4	Julia Bleasdale	Great Britain	15:02.00	Q, PB
5	Molly Huddle	United States	15:02.26	Q, SB
6	Yelena Nagovitsyna	Russia	15:02.80	q, PB
7	Joanne Pavey	Great Britain	15:02.84	q, SB
8	Shitaye Eshete	Bahrain	15:05.48	q, PB
9	Elena Romagnolo	Italy	15:06.38	q, PB
10	Hitomi Niiya	Japan	15:10.20	PB
11	Almensh Belete	Belgium	15:10.24	SB
12	Kim Conley	United States	15:14.48	PB
13	Mika Yoshikawa	Japan	15:16.77	PB
14	Nadia Ejjafini	Italy	15:24.70	
15	Sheila Reid	Canada	15:27.41	
16	Zakia Mrisho	Tanzania	15:39.58	
17	Layes Abdullayeva	Azerbaijan	15:45.69	
18	Roxana Bârcă	Romania	16:01.04	

Notes: Q- Qualified by place
q - Qualified by performance (time)
PB - Personal best
NR - National record
SB - Seasonal best
DQ - Disqualified
DNS - Did not start
DNF - Did not finish

=== Final ===
Rank	Athlete	Nationality	Time	Notes
1st place, gold medalist(s)	Meseret Defar	Ethiopia	15:04.25	
2nd place, silver medalist(s)	Vivian Cheruiyot	Kenya	15:04.73	
3rd place, bronze medalist(s)	Tirunesh Dibaba	Ethiopia	15:05.15	
4	Sally Kipyego	Kenya	15:05.79	
5	Gelete Burka	Ethiopia	15:10.66	
6	Viola Kibiwot	Kenya	15:11.59	
7	Joanne Pavey	Great Britain	15:12.72	
8	Julia Bleasdale	Great Britain	15:14.55	
9	Olga Golovkina	Russia	15:17.88	
10	Shitaye Eshete	Bahrain	15:19.13	
11	Molly Huddle	United States	15:20.29	
12	Tejitu Daba	Bahrain	15:21.34	
13	Yelena Nagovitsyna	Russia	15:21.38	
14	Julie Culley	United States	15:28.22	
15	Elena Romagnolo	Italy	15:35.69	
