= Yelena Nagovitsyna =

Russian long-distance runner

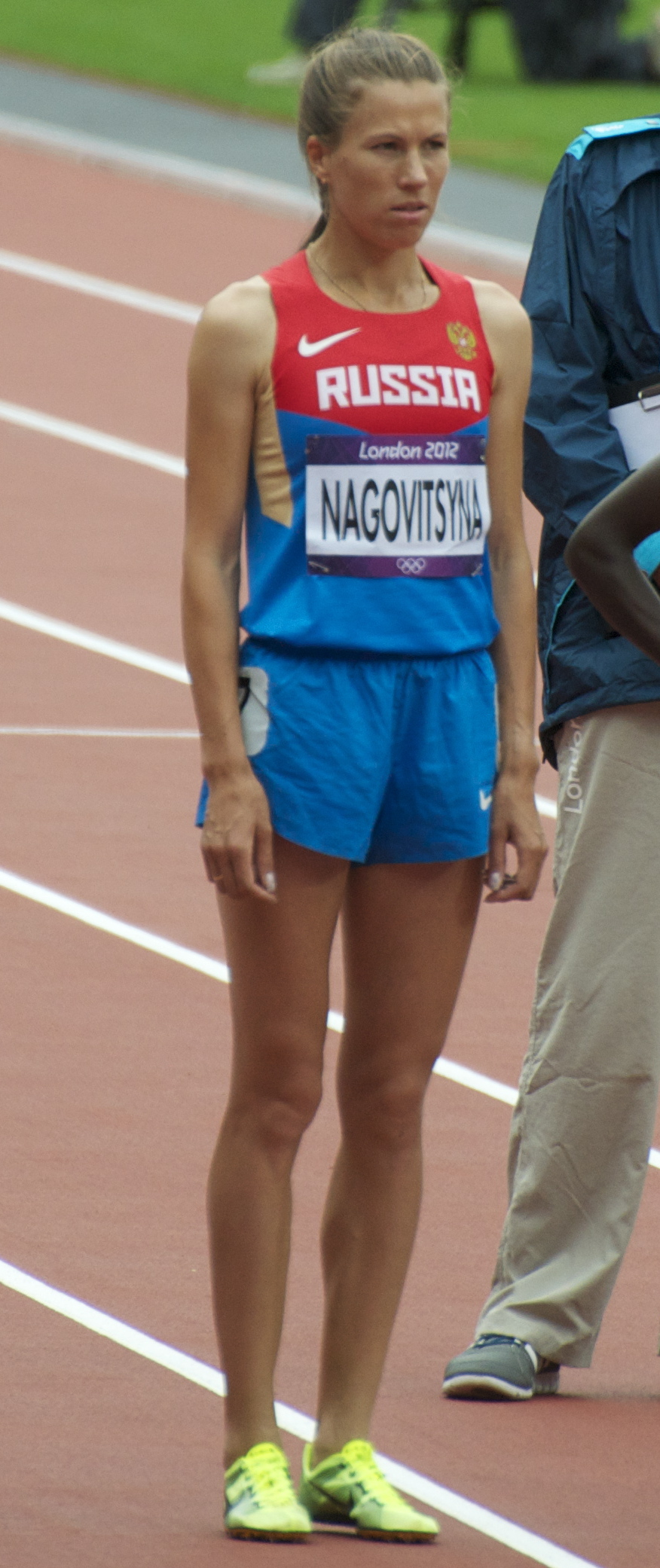
Yelena Nagovitsyna at the 2012 Olympics

Yelena Stanislavovna Nagovitsyna (Russian: Елена Станиславовна Наговицына; born 7 December 1982 in Udmurtia) is a Russian long-distance runner. At the 2012 Summer Olympics, she competed in the Women's 5000 metres, finishing 9th overall in Round 1, qualifying for the final, finishing in 13th position. In her qualifying round she achieved her personal best at 5000 metres, with a time of 15:02.80. In the same event, she finished in 9th place at the 2013 World Championships.
