= Nadia Noujani =

Moroccan long-distance runner

Nadia Noujani at the start of the 2013 World Cross Country Championships

Nadia Noujani (Arabic: نادية نوجاني; born 3 September 1981 in Touarga, Rabat-Salé-Kénitra) is a Moroccan long-distance runner. At the 2012 Summer Olympics, she competed in the Women's 5000 metres, but did not finish her race.

== Doping ==
Noujani tested positive for EPO at a competition in Tanger 26 April 2014, and was subsequently handed a two-year doping ban.
