= Olga Golovkina =

Russian athlete (born 1986)

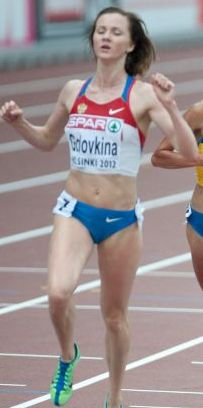
- Olga Golovkina winning the 5000 m final at the 2012 European Athletics Championships in Helsinki

Personal information
- Full name: Olga Gennadyevna Golovkina
- Born: 17 December 1986 (age 39) Perm, Russia
- Height: 1.70 m (5 ft 7 in)
- Weight: 50 kg (110 lb) (2013)

Sport
- Country: Russia
- Sport: Track and field
- Event: 5000 m
- College team: Chaykovsky State Institute of Physical Culture

Olga Gennadyevna Golovkina (Ольга Геннадьевна Головкина; born 17 December 1986) is a Russian athlete. She won the gold medal in the 5000 m at the 2012 European Athletics Championships in Helsinki in a time of 15:11.70 minutes.

Golovkina finished second in the 5000m at the 2013 Summer Universiade in Kazan behind Roxana Bârcă of Romania. She was subsequently upgraded to first place after Bârcă failed the post-race doping control, even though Golovkina herself then tested positive in an out-of-competition drugs test just five days after the race, for use of the prohibited anabolic steroid Dehydrochloromethyltestosterone. Golovkina was given a two-year ban from competition for her failed test, lasting from 16 July 2013 to 1 August 2015.

== International competitions ==
Representing Russia
Year	Competition	Venue	Position	Event	Notes
2010	European Championships	Barcelona, Spain	9th	5000 m	15:31.11
2012	European Championships	Helsinki, Finland	1st	5000 m	15:11.70
2012	Olympic Games	London, United Kingdom	9th	5000 m	15:17.88
2013	Universiade	Kazan, Russia	1st	5000 m	15:43.77

== See also ==
- List of doping cases in athletics
- List of European Athletics Championships medalists (women)
- List of people from Perm
