= Igor Volgin =

Russian poet (1942)

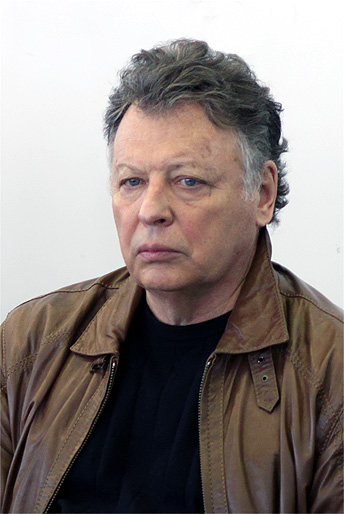
Igor Volgin, 2011

Igor Leonidovich Volgin (Russian: И́горь Леони́дович Во́лгин; born March 6, 1942, Molotov) is a Soviet and Russian writer and historian, poet, specialist in literature.

== Biography ==
Igor Volgin was born in March 1942 in Molotov, where his parents were in the evacuation. Father Leonid Samuilovich Volgin (1909–2002) a journalist. His mother, Rakhil Lvovna Volgina (1912–2002) corrector. In 1959 he graduated from the Moscow school No 626, from 1959 to 1964 - student MSU Faculty of History. Still during the period of study at the university he became known as a poet.

Scientific interests Igor Volgin studying the life and work of Fyodor Dostoyevsky, the history of Russian literature, the history of Russian journalism 19th century, Russian history. Volgin - author of over 250 scientific papers.

In 1997, Igor Volgin creates Dostoevsky Foundation, whose goal is to promote the study of the life and works of Russian classics, the implementation of scientific and cultural programs.

Lead author of the program Glass Bead Game on channel Russia-K.

== Personal life ==
Wife Katya Volgina (born September 13, 1987).
