= Konstantin Chaschukhin =

Russian ice hockey player

- Born: June 5, 1978 (age 46); Perm, Russia, Soviet Union
- Height: 5 ft 8 in (173 cm)
- Weight: 185 lb (84 kg; 13 st 3 lb)
- Position: Goaltender
- Caught: Left
- Played for: Molot-Prikamye Perm; HC Sibir Novosibirsk; HC Yugra
- NHL draft: Undrafted
- Playing career: 1995–2014

Konstantin Chaschukhin (born June 5, 1978) is a former Russian professional ice hockey goaltender who played in the Russian Superleague (RSL) and Kontinental Hockey League (KHL).

Chaschukhin was born in Perm, Russia.
