= Igor Gindis =

Russian journalist (born 1965)

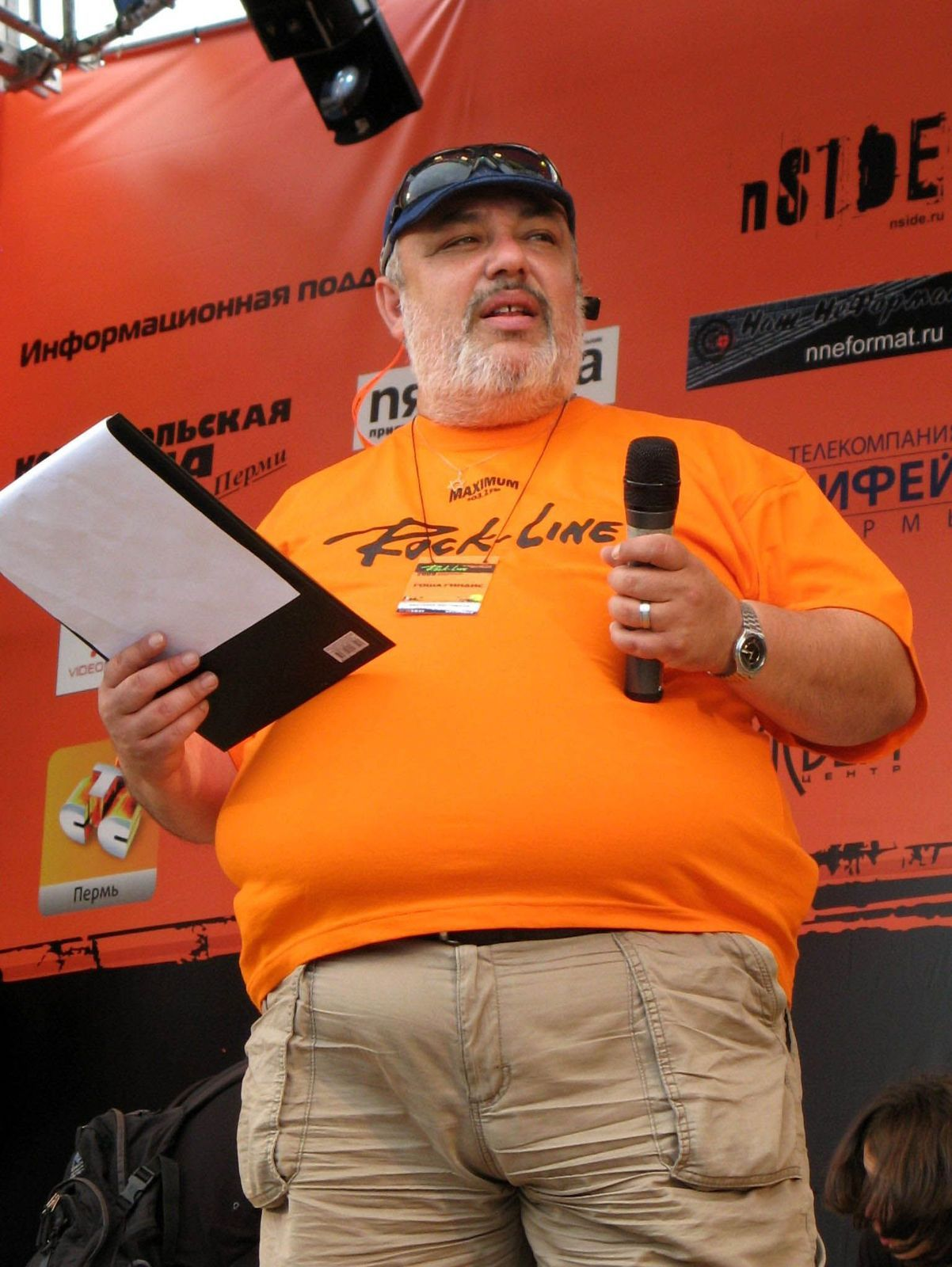

Igor Markovich Gindis (Russian: Игорь Маркович Гиндис, born 8 February 1965) is a Russian journalist, rock musician and actor. He is a presenter of show "Dezhurnyi po gorodu" (Russian: "Дежурный по городу", City Duty) on the TV channel "Rifey-Perm" in Perm Krai, Russia. In 2006, according to the results of a public opinion poll, conducted by the department of sociological monitoring of Perm Krai administration, Igor Gindis led the list of most famous journalists of Perm and Perm Krai. He obtained 22.5% votes in Perm Krai and 35.1% votes in Perm (Anna Vodovatova, his colleague from "City Duty", took the second place in the city and the third place in the krai).

== Acting career ==
Although Igor Gindis didn't get an actor's education, he played several roles in the shows of theatres of Perm. His debut was the main role in the show of Novy Theatre, "Whole Shakespeare in two hours". In the comedy "Hamster Day" by Mikhail Eliseev he played two roles: Irina Khakamada and "dream man". In 2007 he played the role of Takhir Zakirov in the show of Perm Academic Drama Theatre "Playing the Victim" (Russian: "Изображая жертву"), based on a play by the Presnyakov brothers, staged by Boris Milgram.

== Musical career ==
In 1996 Gindis founded the rock band "Batrachomyomachia" (Russian: Батрахомиомахия). This name goes from the Ancient Greek comic epic "Batrachomyomachia" (Ancient Greek: Βατραχομυομαχια, Battle of Frogs and Mice).
