= Mikhail Shuisky =

Russian opera singer

Mikhail Grigorievich Shuisky
- Михаил Григорьевич Шуйский
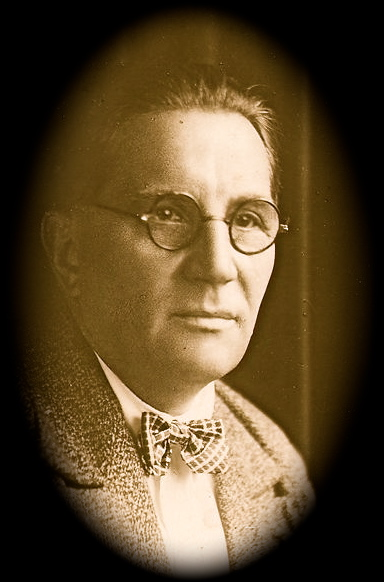
- Born: 13 November 1883; Novogeorgievsk, Russian Empire
- Died: 11 September 1953 (aged 69); Perm, Russia
- Occupations: Opera singer (baritone); Singing teacher
- Years active: 1910–1949
- Awards: Honored Artist of Russia; Order of the Red Banner of Labour

Mikhail Grigorievich Shuisky (Russian: Михаил Григорьевич Шуйский), (13 November [O.S. 1 November] 1883 – 11 September 1953) was a opera and concert singer. He sang leading baritone roles in Austria, Germany and Russia during his 40-year career. After his retirement from the stage, he taught singing.

He was born in Novogeorgievsk. He studied first at Saint Petersburg Conservatory, then at Vienna Conservatory from 1905 to 1909.

He sang leading roles at the Vienna Volksoper and the Landestheater Linz (where he was known as Michael Shuisky) and had signed long-term contracts to sing in Salzburg and Hamburg before the outbreak of the First World War. When war broke out, he returned to the Russian Empire, where he completed his career. He was a leading baritone in the Theatre of Opera and Drama in Saint Petersburg; Kiev Opera and Ballet Theatre; Odessa Opera and Ballet Theatre; and the Perm Opera and Ballet Theatre. Shuisky was made an Honored Artist of Russia in 1945 and received the Order of the Red Banner of Labour in 1946. He died in Perm shortly before his 70th birthday. A bust of Shuisky was displayed at an art exhibition in 1951 and is kept in the museum of the Perm Opera and Ballet Theatre.

== Biography ==
Shuisky was born November 13, 1883, in Novogeorgievsk province of Kherson (now Kirovohrad region) in Ukraine. His family soon moved to Kremenchuk, Poltava province. As a child, he sang in the family circle and appeared in the children's choir at the main Cathedral in Kremenchuk.

In 1904, Shuisky graduated from the Kharkov Commercial College of Emperor Alexander III – one of the largest business schools institutions in the Russian Empire. He was a daily soloist with the choirboys for ten years at the school's Temple, which was called Holy Face of the Lord.

In 1905, Shuisky entered the Saint Petersburg Conservatory to study solo singing. In response to the events of the first Russian revolution, classes at the Conservatory stopped. He went to Vienna to study under Professor Habeck at the Imperial Academy of Music and the Performing Arts, remaining until 1909.

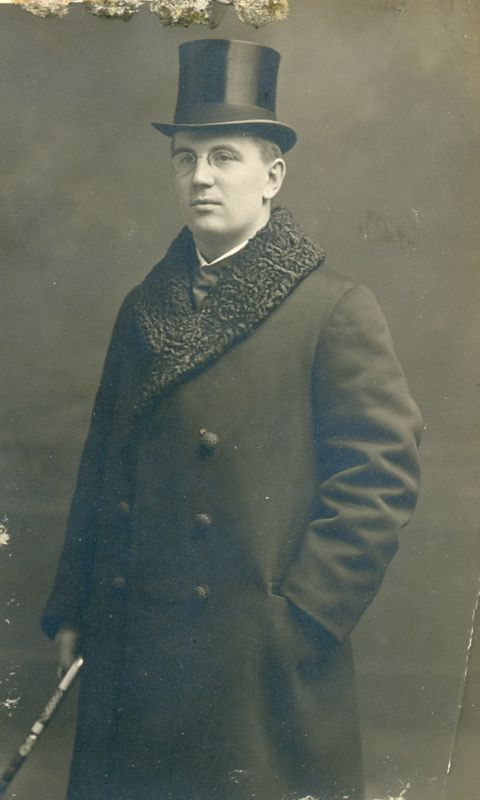
Shuisky in 1910

In 1910, a Russian member of parliament in Vienna invited Shuisky to participate in a concert in honor of Nikolai Gogol in Lviv. A review of this concert in the newspaper Prikarpatskaya Rus' (April 1910) said, "... Mr. Shuisky has a beautiful voice of extremely strong timbre and wide range, and may be considered the successor of the glorious Chaliapin." After a concert in Vienna, where he sang an aria as Petruchio in The Taming of the Shrew, critics wrote "...Mr. Mikhail Shuisky played Petruchio in 'The Taming of the Shrew' with amazing skill." In the newspaper Novoye Vremya of May 1910, critics wrote "Mikhail Shuisky has unique qualities as an opera singer. His baritone voice has a wonderful soft timbre and a wide range. Today, he can be compared only with Mattia Battistini. From everything we've heard at concerts, it can be assumed that M. Shuisky will take a place in the ranks of the finest singers of the world, maybe even the very finest." Following many successful concert performances Shuisky was invited to sing at the Vienna Volksoper.

In September 1911, Shuisky debuted as "Priest" in The Magic Flute. On October 21, 1911, he debuted as Biterolf in Tannhäuser. On November 18, 1911, he debuted as Escamillo in Carmen.

In 1912, to supplement his repertoire, Shuisky signed a contract for the season 1912/1913, as the only dramatic baritone with the Landestheater in Linz and in the summer in Salzburg. Linz was in at that time considered the third largest city in the Austrian Empire. During the two years in the opera house in Linz, Shuisky improved and increased his visibility. A review in the newspaper Die Wahrheit April 1912, said, "M. Shuisky, as a leading actor in G. Verdi's opera Rigoletto, did something unique. His singing was great and wonderful in every way, with amazing purity of sound. Mr. Shuisky again proved his artistic skill brilliantly."

On March 25, 1912, an anniversary concert for Anatoly Arkhangelsky at the Regent Russian Embassy Church in Vienna consisted entirely of works by Russian composers: Turchaninov, Berezovsky, Gretchaninov, Mandyczewski, Scriabin, Bortkiewicz, Mussorgsky, Arensky, Rubinstein and Anatoly Arkhangelsky. Shuisky was listed as baritone soloist of the Opera Volksoper. Paul de Conne played piano.

Shuisky received several proposals for contracts with the theaters Breslau, Linz, Leipzig, Munich, and Hamburg. On October 1, 1912, he signed a two-year agreement with the Imperial Theatre in Munich. On October 12, 1912, he inked a five-year agreement with the Hamburger und Altonaer Stadt-Theater in Hamburg. Political events made staying in Austria impossible. In 1913, Shuisky terminated all contracts and moved to Saint Petersburg. On March 30, 1913, in the city's Mariinsky Theatre, Shuisky successfully auditioned for voice jalong with tenor Malyshev. He had two years of experience on stage in Vienna, Linz, Salzburg, and therefore rejected the director's proposal as elementary. Shuisky, auditioned for Iosif Lapitsky, who was known in Saint Petersburg as a talented opera director and innovator. In 1912, he created the Musical Theater in Saint Petersburg.

On March 10, 1914, he contracted with the Musical Theater. The Agreement covered August 1914 to January 1915. Shuisky acted the part of Escamillo in the opera Carmen by Georges Bizet. From the beginning of World War I Shuisky was actively involved in patriotic charity concerts that were organized by MI Gorlenko-Dolina in the auditorium of Circus Ciniselli, which had a capacity of 5,000 spectators. He received letters of appreciation from Grand Duchess Xenia Alexandrovna and from Marie Pavlovna."To His Excellency Mr Michael Grigorevich Shuisky: Your gracious participation in the Patriotic Supper, on September 11 this year, in the auditorium of the Ciniselli Circus, contributed to the remarkable success of that night, all the proceeds from which went toward medical supplies for the sick and wounded. By order of the Grand Duchess, I have the honor to thank you from Her Imperial Highness for your kind assistance in helping the sick and wounded soldiers. General-Adjutant Prince M. Tashunin. 22 September 1914"

In 1916, Shuisky moved to Ukraine. During the German occupation and the Civil War in Ukraine, Shuisky was a teacher, soloist in concert performances and played the title role in Tchaikovsky's Eugene Onegin

From 1923 to 1932 Shuisky was an Artist of Ukrainian State Opera – he worked at the Opera and Ballet Theater in Kiev and Opera and Ballet Theater in Odessa. Shuisky was a soloist. He taught at the conservatory and sang in concerts and on the radio.

In 1932, as part of the Odessa Opera House committee, Shuisky went to Moscow, to the Ministry of Culture with his suggestions about how to stop conflicts between the creative team and the government's administration. The discussion led to Shuisky's exile to Perm.

From 1932 to 1949 Shuisky continued his creative work at the Theatre of Opera and Ballet of Perm.

On January 18, 1936, Perm newspaper Zvezda published an article, "The 25th anniversary of the opera singer Shuisky." It recorded that the Perm City Council supported the application for Shuisky to be given the title of Honored Artist of the Republic, which had been made by music and opera lovers and groups of actors from Perm to the People's Commissariat of Russia.

In 1945 Shuisky was awarded the "Honored Artist of the Russian Federation" is assigned to highly professional actors, who have received recognition from the public. In 1946, Shuisky was awarded the Order of the Red Banner, an established award for service in science, culture, literature, the arts, public education and other spheres of creative activity. On May 13, 1949, his 40th anniversary on stage was celebrated at a farewell performance. The program included scenes from Tosca (Shuisky as Baron Scarpia), Dubrovsky (Shuisky as Troekurov), and Prince Igor (Shuisky as Prince Igor).

In 1949, Shuisky began teaching.

Between 1951 and 1952 he wrote his memoirs, My Theatrical Memories, later archived at the Museum of the Opera and Ballet Theatre in Perm.

In 1951, a regional art exhibition displayed a bust of "M.G. Shuisky, Honored Artist of the RSFSR." The Sculpture is kept in the museum of the Opera and Ballet Theatre in Perm.

September 11, 1953, Shuisky died of a brain haemorrhage at age 69. He was buried in Yegoshikha Cemetery (Quarter X, Grave number 50) .

Tenor Ivan Kozlovsky had been one of Shuisky's students in Kiev. They maintained a lifelong friendship, and Kozlovsky took an active role in Shuisky's funeral.

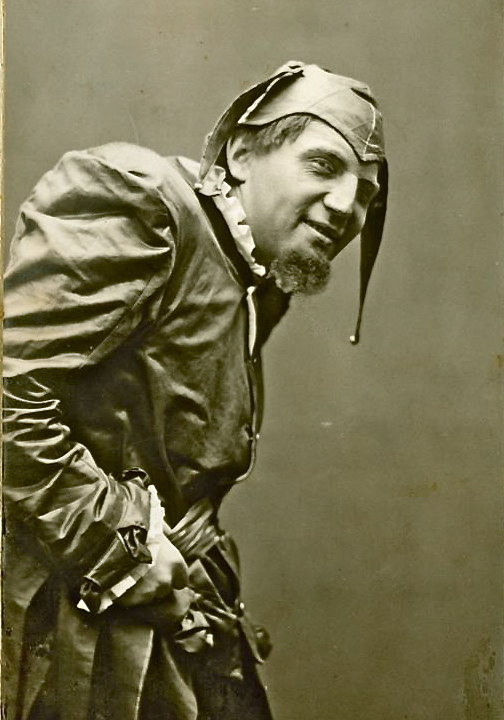
As Rigoletto, Linz, 1912

== Opera roles ==
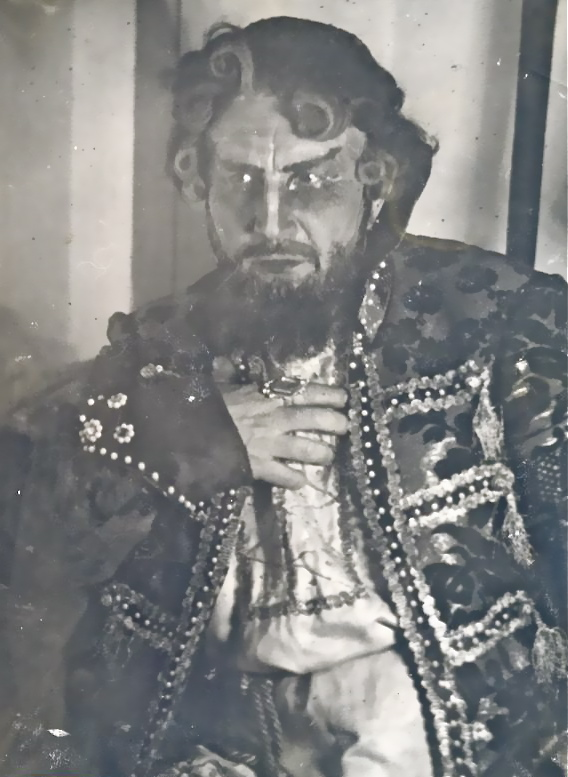
As Gryaznoy in The Tsar's Bride, Kiev

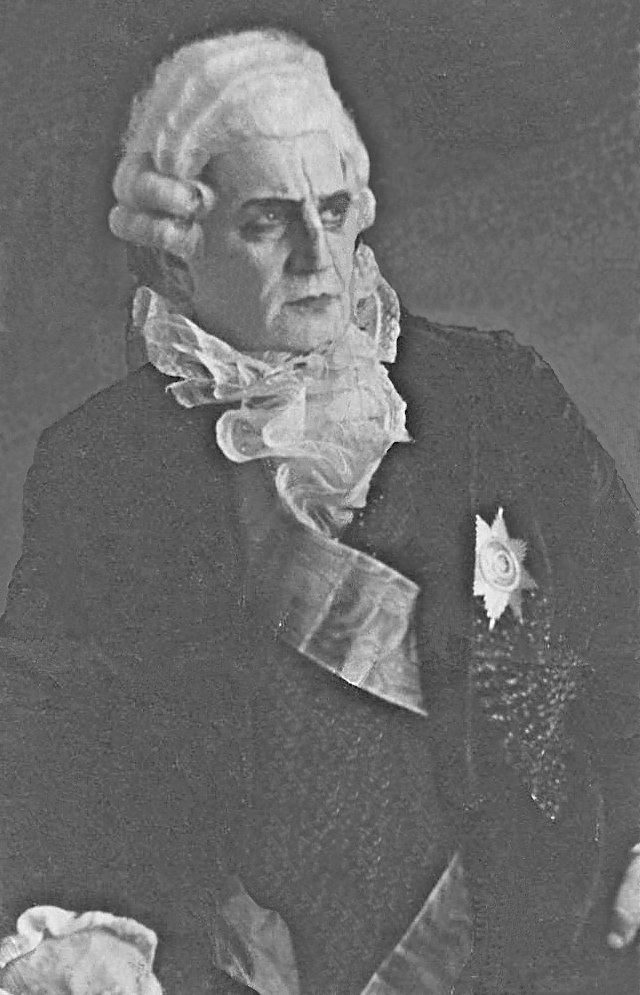
As Scarpia in Tosca, Odessa

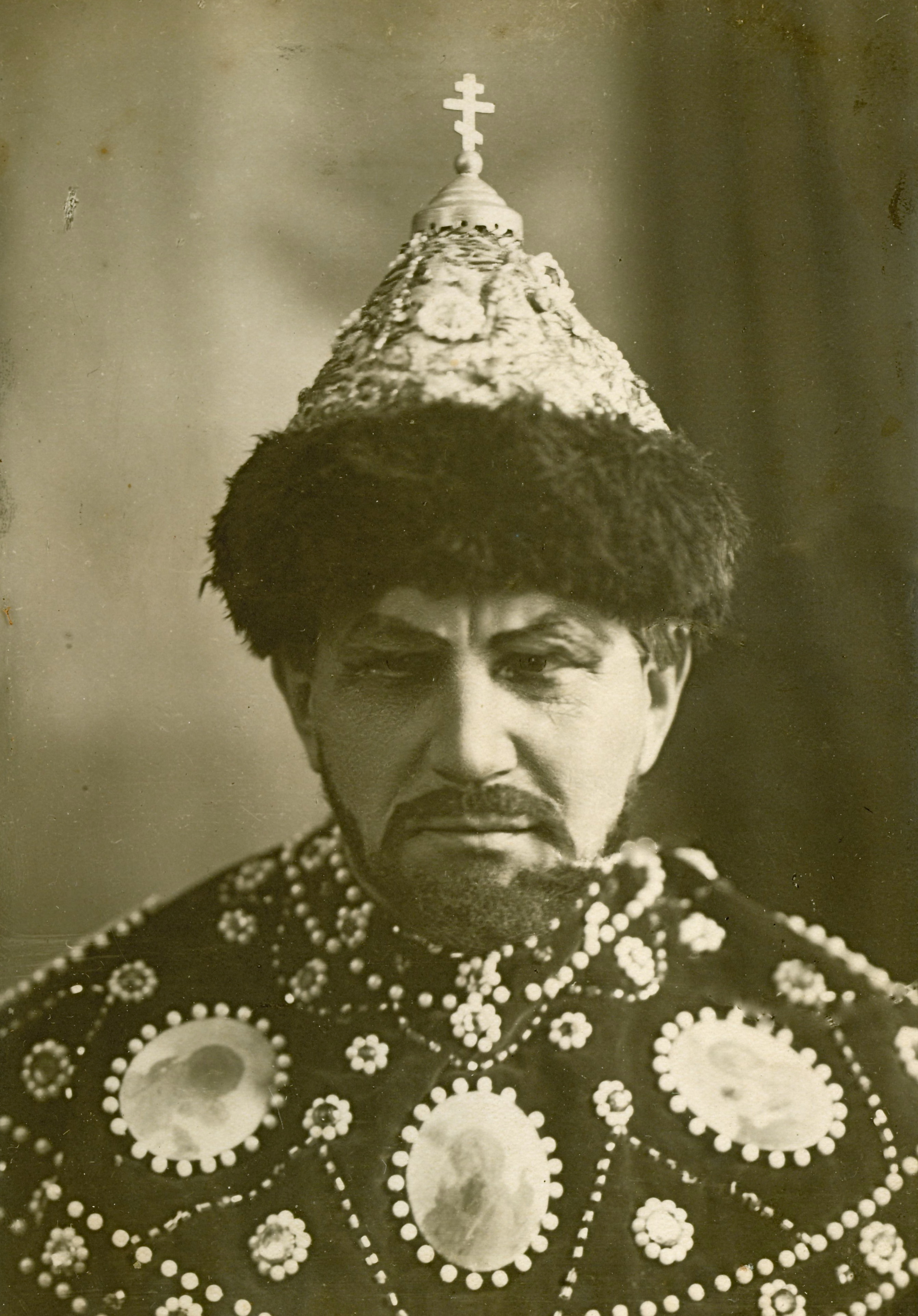
As Boris Godunov, Perm

Vienna Volksoper

- 1910 – Priest, The Magic Flute
- 1911 – Biterolf, Tannhäuser
- 1911 – Escamillo, Carmen

Landestheater Linz (1912–1913)

- Escamillo, Carmen
- Le Comte de Saint-Bris, Les Huguenots
- Nélusko, L'Africaine
- Don Pizarro Fidelio
- Amonasro, Aida
- Rigoletto, Rigoletto
- Otello, Otello
- Count di Luna, Il trovatore
- Renato, Un ballo in maschera
- Valentin, Faust
- Wotan, Die Walküre
- Biterolf, Tannhauser
- Beckmesser, Die Meistersinger von Nürnberg

Theatre of Opera and Drama, Saint Petersburg

- 1914 – Escamillo, Carmen

Union of Theatre Workers of the Russian Federation, Kremenchuk

- 1917 Eugene Onegin, Eugene Onegin

Opera houses in Kiev, Kharkiv, and Odessa

- 1922 – Prince Igor, Prince Igor
- 1922 – Boris Godunov, Boris Godunov
- 1932 – Mazeppa, Mazeppa

Perm Opera and Ballet Theatre (1931–1949)

- Boris Godunov, Boris Godunov
- Rigoletto, Rigoletto
- Iago, Otello
- Escamillo, Carmen
- Scarpia, Tosca
- Prince Igor, Prince Igor
- Grigory Gryaznoy, The Tsar's Bride
- Demon, The Demon
- Mazeppa, Mazeppa
- Shaklovity, Khovanshchina
- Figaro, The Barber of Seville
- Germont, La traviata
- Tonio, Pagliacci
- Amonasro, Aida

== Family ==
=== Yanina Pavlovska ===
In 1905, Shuisky met Yanina Pavlovska in Vienna, where she had moved from Warsaw to study singing at the Academy of Art of the Song. They married in 1906 in St. Nicholas Orthodox Cathedral in Vienna.

In 1910 and in 1912, the couple participated together in concerts in Vienna and Yanina played the title role in "Aida" by Verdi. Critics wrote "Sir Michael Shuisky of the Municipal Theatre in Linz, in the role of Amonasro in "Aida", with his wife Yanina Shuisky performing as Aida, gave an outstanding vocal performance."

In 1917, in Kremenchug, Yanina played Tatiana in Eugene Onegin. A review of this performance stated, "Mrs. Shuisky gave a superb performance as a Tatiana. Mr. Shuisky was an excellent Onegin, with a big, beautiful, smooth voice in all registers. Appearance, manner, performance, all were immaculate. It was a great delight to listen to and watch M. Shuisky and Y. Shuisky as Onegin and Tatiana... " During the Civil War, Yanina Shuisky lost her voice and in the future could only sing in the choir.

From 1923 to 1932, she worked as a costume art designer and as a photographer at the Kiev Opera and Ballet Theatre, the Odessa Opera and Ballet Theatre and from 1933 to 1939 as a costume designer and photographer at the Perm Opera and Ballet Theatre. Their marriage lasted 34 years. Yanina Shuisky died in 1940 in Perm. She was buried in the Yegoshikha Cemetery with her husband.

=== Eugene Shuisky ===
Son Eugene M. Shuisky was born in 1908 in Vienna, Austria. In 1931 he graduated from the painting department of the arts at the Ukrainian Academy of Arts in Kiev. In 1929, Shuisky was involved with his artwork in the second All-Ukrainian art exhibition of USSR People's Commissariat, which displayed in Odessa, Donetsk and Kharkov.

He worked as chief designer at the opera theater in Perm, Gorky and Saratov. Shiusky was a member of United Russian artists. He died in 1975 in Saratov.

=== Marina Shuisky ===
Daughter Marina M. Shuisky was born in 1915 in Kremenchug. She graduated from medical school in Moscow. She worked as a pediatrician in Moscow, Perm, Ufa, Gorky, and Novosibirsk. In Novosibirsk, she worked as a pediatrician at a Children's Hospital and as a lecturer at the Medical Institute at the Department of Pediatrics. Shuisky died in Novosibirsk in 1975.
