= Anna Vodovatova =

Russian journalist

Anna Vladimirovna Vodovatova (Russian: Анна Владимировна Водоватова) is a Russian journalist, a presenter of show "Dezhurny po gorodu" (Russian: Дежурный по городу, "City Duty") on the TV channel "Riphey-Perm" in Perm Krai, Russia.

In 2002 Anna Vodovatova won the Award for the Best Author of Third Regional Creative Journalists' Competition for the best publication on the information support of municipal services. In the May 2002 she won the competition for the best reporting on the "Chisty gorod" (Russian: Чистый город, "Clear city") campaign, conducted by the Outward Improvement Board.

In 2006, according to the results of public opinion poll, conducted by the department of sociological monitoring of Perm Krai administration, Anna Vodovatova was acknowledged as one of the most famous journalists of Perm and Perm Krai. She took the second place in the city and the third place in the krai (The first place was taken by Igor Gindis, her colleague from "Dezhurny po gorodu").
