= Andrei Bryukhanov =

Russian footballer

Personal information
- Full name: Andrei Valeryevich Bryukhanov
- Date of birth: 10 June 1972 (age 54)
- Place of birth: Perm, Russian SFSR
- Height: 1.85 m (6 ft 1 in)
- Position: Defender

Youth career
- Ural Perm
- FC Zvezda Perm

Senior career*
Years	Team	Apps	(Gls)
1990	FC Energiya Chaykovsky (amateur)		
1991	FC MTsOP-Metallurg Verkhnyaya Pyshma (amateur)		
1992–1993	FC Zvezda Perm	68	(9)
1994	FC Baltika Kaliningrad	12	(1)
1994	→ FC Baltika-d Kaliningrad (loan)	2	(0)
1994	FC KAMAZ Naberezhnye Chelny	3	(0)
1995–1996	FC Zenit Saint Petersburg	23	(1)
1995–1996	→ FC Zenit-d St. Petersburg	5	(0)
1996	FC Gazovik-Gazprom Izhevsk	0	(0)
1996–1997	FC Energiya Chaykovsky	20	(0)
1997	FC Pobeda-Avtomobilist Saint Petersburg		
1998	FC Energiya Chaykovsky	16	(1)
1999	FC Amkar Perm	1	(0)
1999–2000	FC Metallurg Krasnoyarsk	35	(0)
2000	FC Sodovik Sterlitamak	10	(0)
2001–2002	FC Sibiryak Bratsk	38	(1)
2002	FC Smena Komsomolsk-na-Amure	14	(0)
2003	FC Dynamo-Mashinostroitel Kirov	19	(0)
2004	FC Lada-SOK Dimitrovgrad	6	(0)
2006	FC Oktan Perm (amateur)		

International career
1993	Russia U21	3	(0)
- * Club domestic league appearances and goals

Andrei Valeryevich Bryukhanov (Russian: Андрей Валерьевич Брюханов; born 10 June 1972) is a Russian former football player.
