= Yuliana Malkhasyants =

- Born: Perm, USSR
- Employer: Bolshoi Theatre
- Awards: Honoured Artist of Russia (1997); Medal of the Order "For Merit to the Fatherland" 2nd class (2001)

Yuliana Malkhasyants is a Russian choreographer and a recipient of the Medal of the Order "For Merit to the Fatherland" 2nd class as well as Honored Artist of Russia.

== Early life ==
Malkhasyants was born as the only child to a ballet family in Perm, Russia. Her mother danced Kitri two months after she was born while her father was a Spanish dancer as well as a teacher. She then began to attend and then graduated from the Moscow Ballet School in 1983 where she was under guidance from Galina Kuznetsova. After the graduation she quite performing classical roles which she realized wasn't her best after she performed in a comic ballet called Coppélia at the age of 18. Later on she was invited to Bolshoi Theatre's ballet company by Yury Grigorovich after he saw her dancing both Gipsy and Georgian dances as well as Lezginka and then began attending Russian Academy of Theatre Arts from which she graduated as ballet master in 1994.

== Career ==
As of 1995 she works as choreography teacher at the Institute of Modern Arts. From 1992 to 1997 she was the artistic director of the “Russian ballet on ice” with which troupe she worked to stage a ballet called Catharsis in 1992 which was based on Carl Orff's music. In 1993 she appeared in a Chili-Bolivian ballet Songs of the Andes and in 1996 appeared in Antigonae. During the same year she also played a nurse in Romeo and Juliet and then appeared in Swan Lake as a Spanish dancer. In 2000 she staged The Nutcracker on ice along with Pasha Gristchuk in Biloxi, Mississippi and in 2001 was an assistant director of Carmen. Two years later Malkhasyants staged The Sleeping Beauty and Swan Lake which was followed by Don Quixote a year later at which she was not only a director but also its choreographer.

In 2007 the Ballet honored her with the Soul of Dance prize. In 2009 she played a role of Megaera in La Esmeralda of which play she was also assistant director. In 2010 she directed Dances with a teacher which was meant to be a tribute for Vladimir Zeldin. Currently she works as ballet master repertoire as well as a soloist at the Bolshoi Theatre. Under her guidance performers such as Anna Antropova, Maria Isplatovskaya, Timofey Lavrenyuk receive rehearsal lessons.

== Repertoire ==
- 1986 – Raymonda – Spanish dance
- 1986 – Cipollino – Cipolla-mother
- 1986 – Iphigénie en Aulide – Athena
- 1986 – Don Quixote – Bolero, Mercedes
- 1986 – Giselle – Bertha
- 1988 – Khovanshchina – Persian girl
- 1988 – Prince Igor – Tchaga
- 1988 – The Sleeping Beauty – Peasants’ dance
- 1989 – Mlada – witch
- 1989 – Stone Flower – Tradeswoman, a Young gypsy
- 1992 – Le Corsaire – Forban
- 1992 – Romeo and Juliet – nurse
- 1992 – Catharsis
- 1993 – Songs of the Andes
- 1993 – Raymonda – Hungarian dance
- 1994 – Prince Igor – Persian girl
- 1994 – La Sylphide – Madge
- 1995 – Romeo and Juliet – servant
- 1996 – Romeo and Juliet – nurse
- 1996 – Swan Lake
- 1997 – A Life for the Tsar
- 2000 – The Nutcracker
- 2001 – Carmen
- 2003 – The Sleeping Beauty
- 2003 – Swan Lake
- 2004 – Don Quixote
- 2006 – Polovtsian Dances
- 2007 – Cinderella
- 2007 – Madama Butterfly
- 2008 – The Flames of Paris – Jarkas
- 2009 – La Esmeralda – Megaera
- 2010 – Dances with a teacher
