= Katya Shchekina =

Russian model

Katja Shchekina
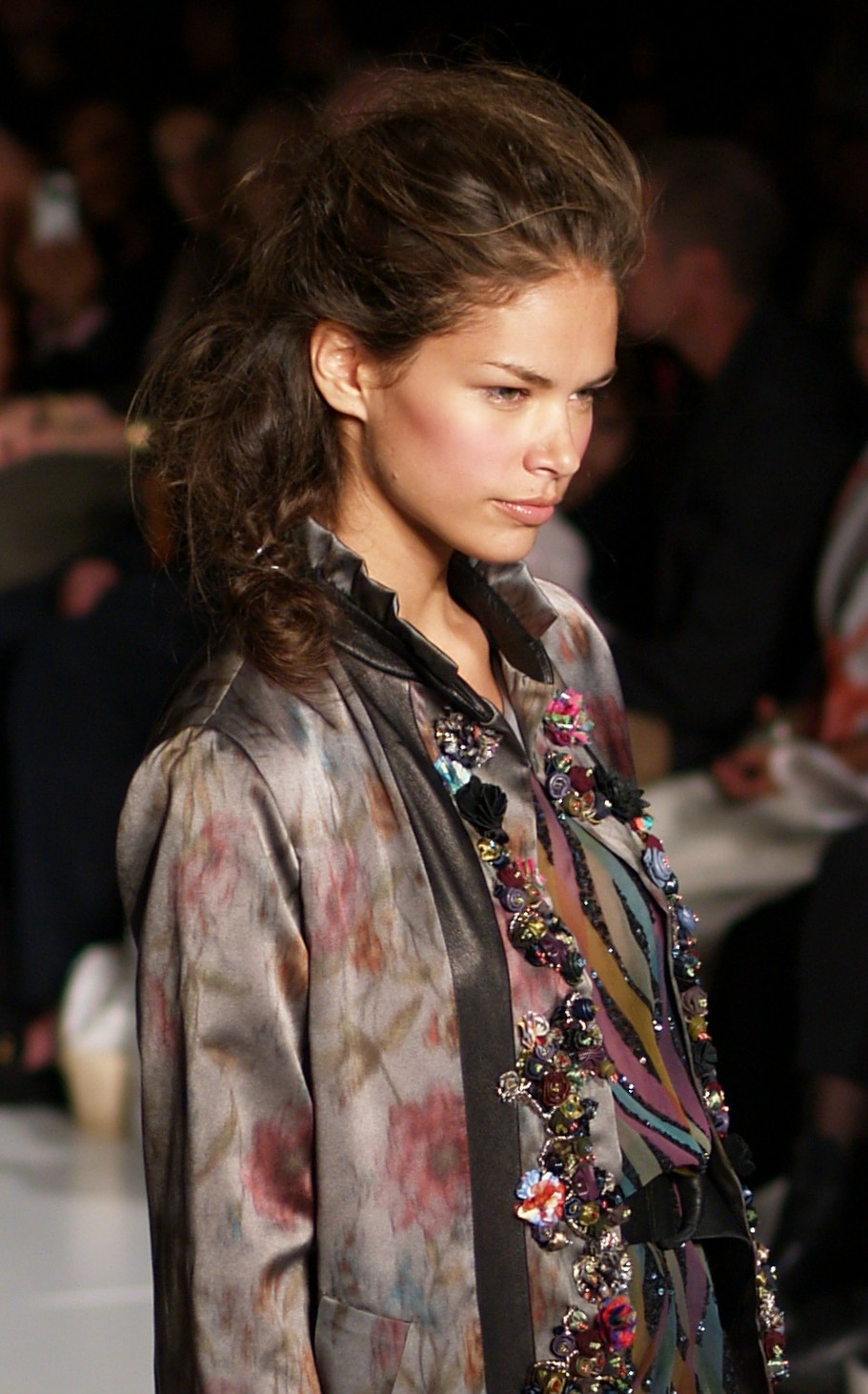
- Katja Shchekina modeling in the Cynthia Rowley spring 2006 show, New York Fashion Week, 14 September 2006.
- Born: May 18, 1986 (age 40); Perm, Russia
- Modeling information
- Height: 1.77 m (5 ft 9 1/2 in)
- Hair color: Brown
- Eye color: Green

Jekaterina Shchekina (Russian: Катя Щекина, (b. May 18, 1986) is a Russian model who has appeared on Victoria's Secret and many high fashion brands.

== Early life and career ==
Katja was born in 1986 in Perm, Russia to a Russian father and a mother of Komi and Hungarian descent.

Shchekina has appeared in Vogue Italia, Vogue Paris and Harpers Bazaar, and has been featured on the cover of L'Officiel and L'Officiel Russia. In addition, she has done advertisements for Dolce & Gabbana, Adidas, Juicy Couture, Neiman Marcus, and Bergdorf Goodman. She has also walked the runway for many top designers such as Givenchy, Alexander McQueen, La Perla, Etro, Oscar de la Renta, and Stella McCartney, as well as Victoria's Secret.

In 2008, after graduating, she married and had quit her modeling career. She has 4 children now.
