= Kristina Alikina =

Russian basketball player

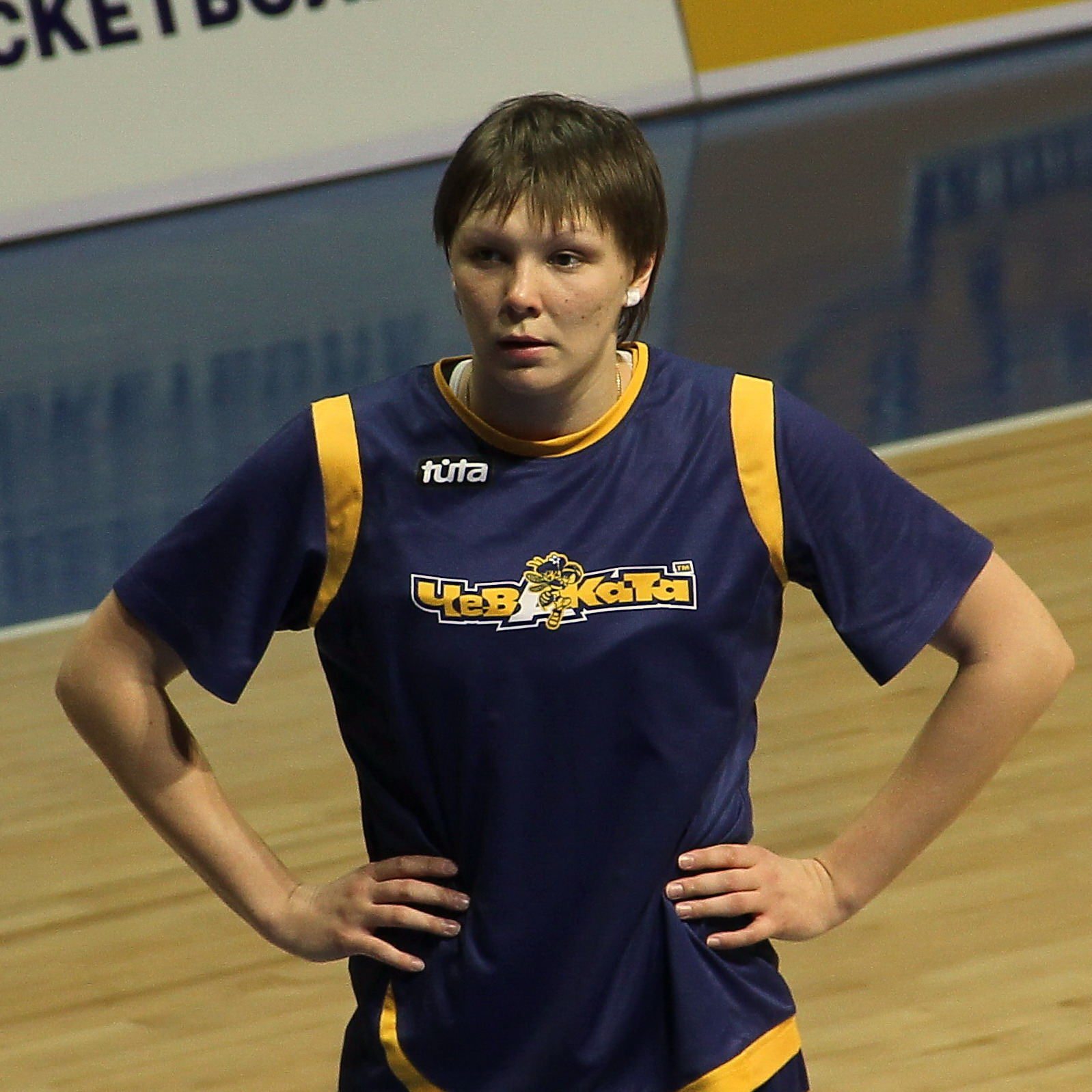
- Alikina in 2012

Personal information
- Born: 23 February 1986 (age 40) Perm, Russia
- Height: 187 cm (6 ft 2 in)
- Weight: 84 kg (185 lb)

Sport
- Sport: Basketball
- Club: WBC Dynamo Novosibirsk (2008–10); Dynamo Moscow (2010–2011); Chevakata Vologda (2011–12); Gorizont (2012–13); Dynamo Kursk (2013–15); Chevakata Vologda (2015–)

Kristina Aleksandrovna Alikina (Russian: Кристина Александровна Аликина; born 23 February 1986) is a Russian basketball power forward. She won a silver medal in the 2013–14 EuroCup and a bronze in the 2014–15 EuroLeague with Dyamo Kursk.
