= Alexander Berkutov =

Russian ice hockey player

- Born: May 31, 1986 (age 40)
- Height: 6 ft 0 in (183 cm)
- Weight: 181 lb (82 kg; 12 st 13 lb)
- Position: Defence
- KHL team Former teams: HC CSKA Moscow; Molot-Prikamye Perm; HC Spartak Moscow; Avtomobilist Yekaterinburg
- Playing career: 2004–present

Alexander Berkutov (born May 31, 1986) is a Russian professional ice hockey defenceman who plays for HC CSKA Moscow of the Kontinental Hockey League (KHL).
