= Dmitry Dmitriyevich Smyshlyayev =

Russian historian, ethnographer and politician

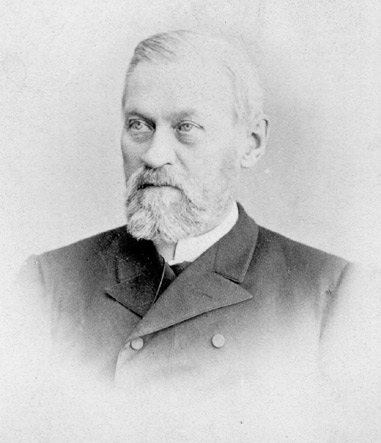
- Born: March 5, 1828; Perm, Russian Empire
- Died: November 27, 1893 (aged 65); Perm, Russian Empire
- Occupations: Historian, ethnographer, journalist, politician
- Parent: Dmitry Yemelyanovich Smyshlyayev

Dmitry Dmitriyevich Smyshlyayev (Russian: Дми́трий Дми́триевич Смышля́ев) was a Russian historian, ethnographer and politician. He is known for the study of history of Perm and Perm Governorate.

Dmitry Dmitriyevich Smyshlyayev was born in Perm, on the March 5, 1828, in the family of Dmitry Yemelyanovich Smyshlyayev, merchant of the 1st guild and mayor of Perm from 1823 to 1826. In 1844 he left the grammar school and assisted his father with commerce until 1857. Then he turned to social and educational activity and study of the local history. He took part in the organization of public reading and Sunday schools, and the foundation of the women's grammar school.

From 1858 to 1860 Smyshlyayev published The Perm Anthology (Russian: "Пермский сборник"), which was devoted to history, ethnography and statistics of Perm Governorate.

From 1870 to 1879 Smyshlyayev was a chairman of the Governorate Executive Board. He brought up the problems of national education, medicine and improvements of social welfare. In 1872 he founded the journal Anthology of Perm Zemstvo (Russian: "Сборник Пермского земства"). He edited it until 1878 and published 34 issues. Later he edited the unofficial part of Perm Governorate News.

In 1885 Smyshlyayev visited Jerusalem as a representative of the Imperial Palestina Society. He supported the building of shelters for the Russian pilgrims. The Orthodox Patriarch of Jerusalem appreciated his services and conferred the title of Knight of Holy Sepulchre on him. Later he returned to Perm and became a Secretary of the Governorat Statistic Committee.

Smyshlyayev died on November 27, 1893. He is buried in Perm at the Yegoshikha Cemetery.

== Publications ==
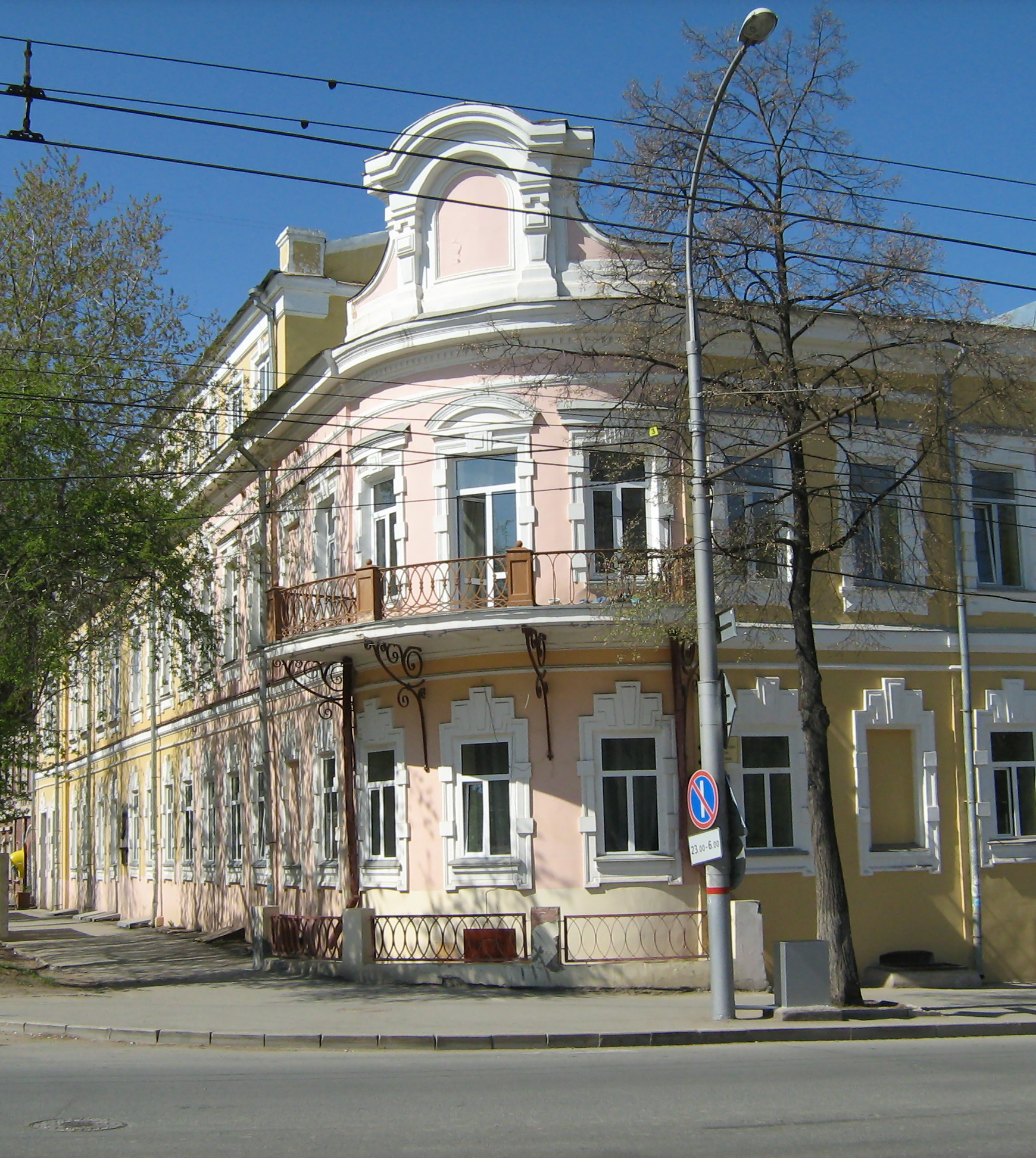
Smyshlyayev's house, where he lived from 1842 to 1864

Other publications:

- Пермский Сборник. (М., 1858 и 1860)
- Источники и пособия для изучения Перм. края. — Пермь, 1876
- Записка к проекту Пермско-Уральской железной дороги. — СПб., 1870
- На пути к Синаю. — Пермь, 1878
- Синай и Палестина. — Пермь, 1877
- Мёртвое море и нечестный Пентаполь по новейшим исследованиям. — Пермь, 1881
- Сборник статей о Пермской губернии. — Пермь, 1891
- Лжеучитель Мензелин. — Вестник, изд. археологическим институтом, 1886, кн. V
- Писательница Е. А. Словцова-Камская. — Исторический Вестник., 1881, No. 5
- К истории судоходства в Зауралье. — Пермские Губернские Ведомости, 1877, No.No. 79 и 80
- Библиографические сведения о разных изданиях, касающихся Пермской губернии. (ib., 1882, №№ 9—43, и 1883, № 5)
- Материалы для истории Пермской губернии и города Перми. (ib., 1883, No.No. 1—3)
- Сибирский тракт и дороги Западной Европы. (ib., 1886, №№ 5 и 6)
- Указатель статей о Пермской губ. — Пермь, 1885. См. III том «Пермского Края» (Пермь, 1895)
- Пермские Губернские Ведомости. 1893 г., №№ 100 и 101
- Сборник материалов для ознакомления с Пермской губ. VI выпуск. — Пермь, 1894
