= Vyacheslav Belov (ice hockey) =

Russian ice hockey player (born 1983)

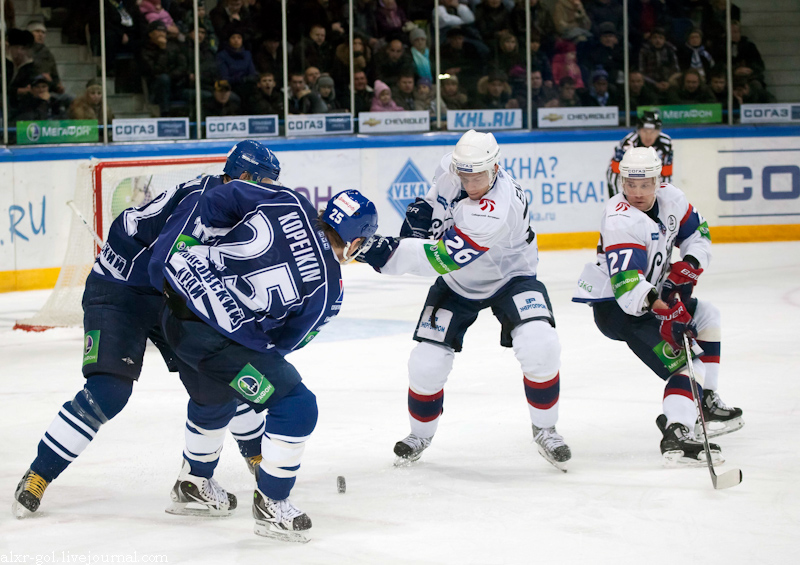
- Enlund 2011-12-04 Amur-Sibir KHL-game
- Born: 17 April 1983 (age 43) Perm, Russian SFSR
- Height: 5 ft 10 in (178 cm)
- Weight: 181 lb (82 kg; 12 st 13 lb)
- Position: Defence
- Shoots: Right
- BXL team Former teams: Shakhter Soligorsk; Avangard Omsk; HC Sibir Novosibirsk; Salavat Yulaev Ufa; HC Spartak Moscow; Atlant Moscow Oblast; Traktor Chelyabinsk; HC Lada Togliatti
- Playing career: 2001–present

Vyacheslav Belov (born 17 April 1983 in Perm, Russia) is a Russian professional ice hockey defenceman currently playing for Shakhter Soligorsk in the Belarusian Hockey League (BXL).
