= Vladislav Zanadvorov =

Soviet poet

Vladislav Leonidovich Zanadvorov
- Born: September 28, 1914; Perm, Soviet Union
- Died: November 28, 1942 (aged 28); Near Stalingrad, Soviet Union
- Education: Perm State University
- Occupations: Poet, writer, geologist
- Writing career
- Genres: Poetry, fiction
- Subjects: World War II, Soviet life
- Notable works: Mednaya Gora (1936), Prostora (1941)
- Notable awards: Posthumous recognition
- Movement: Soviet literature

Vladislav Leonidovich Zanadvorov (Russian: Владислав Ленидович Занадворов; 28 September 1914 – 28 November 1942 (aged 28)) was a Soviet writer best known for his World War II poems.

A geologist by profession, Zanadvorov was conscripted into the Red Army in February 1942 and fell in battle near Stalingrad nine months later.

== Biography ==
Zanadvorov was born in 1914 and grew up in his native town of Perm. He attended a technical high school and honed his youthful interest in geology by taking part in several Soviet geological expeditions after his high school graduation in the early 1930s. These expeditions which took him all over the Soviet Union. He enrolled at Perm State University to study geology in 1935 and finished his degree with distinction in 1940.

A member of several literary groups in the 1930s, Zanadvorov published his first poems in a magazine in 1932. His first book, Mednaya Gora (Copper Mountain), a novelette for young readers, was published in 1936. His first poetry collection, Prostora (The Expanse), appeared in 1941.

Zanadvorov's life was cut short by the German invasion of the Soviet Union in World War II. Conscripted in the Red Army in February 1942, he fell in battle while attacking a German machine gun pillbox at a Rostov Oblast village near Stalingrad on 28 November 1942.

Many dozens of Vladislav Zanadvorov's remaining poems were published posthumously in several anthologies first published in the 1940s and 1950s.
