= Nikolai Zarubin =

Russian painter

Nikolai Zarubin (Russian: Николай Александрович Зарубин (February 13, 1948, Altai – 1998, Perm)) is a prominent Russian artist, a bright representative of the national tradition of philosophic art.

Zarubin's paintings represent his contemplations on the dialectics of existence, the nature of the all-embracing unity, the regularity of cosmic laws, and similar problems.

Most of his creative life the artist lived in the city of Perm, the Ural. The last nine years of his life were the most fruitful: he created his most powerful canvasses, such as Carthage. Might and Its Futility, The Star of Bethlehem, Egregore (Patron) of Perm, Earthly Incarnation, etc.
