= List of Cyrillic letters =

This is a list of letters of the Cyrillic script. The definition of a Cyrillic letter for this list is a character encoded in the Unicode standard that has a script property of 'Cyrillic' and the general category of 'Letter'. An overview of the distribution of Cyrillic letters in Unicode is given in Cyrillic script in Unicode.

== Letters contained in the Russian alphabet ==
Letters contained in the Russian alphabet.

Letters in the Modern Russian alphabet
Аа	Бб	Вв	Гг	Дд	Ее	Ëë	Жж	Зз	Ии
Йй	Кк	Лл	Мм	Нн	Оо	Пп	Рр	Сс	Тт
Уу	Фф	Хх	Цц	Чч	Шш	Щщ	Ъъ	Ыы	Ьь
Ээ	Юю	Яя							

== Other letters ==
Other letters
Letter	Name	Languages/alphabets	Notes
Ә ә	Schwa	Kazakh, Tatar, Bashkir, Abkhaz	
◌ⷠ	Superscript Be		
Ԝ ԝ	We	Kurdish, Yaghnobi, Tundra Yukaghir	
ᲀ	Rounded Ve		Variant of normal ve
Ԁ ԁ	Komi De	Komi (1919–1940)	
ᲁ	Long-legged De		Variant of normal de
Ꙣ ꙣ	Soft De	Old Church Slavonic	
Ђ ђ	Dje	Montenegrin, Serbian	
Ԃ ԃ	Komi Dje	Komi (1919–1940)	
Ꚁ ꚁ	Dwe	Abkhaz (1909–1926)	replaced by Дә
Є є	Ukrainian Ye	Ukrainian, Khanty	
Ԑ ԑ	Reversed Ze	Enets, Khanty	
Ѕ ѕ	Dze	Macedonian	
Ꙅ ꙅ	Reversed Dze	Old Church Slavonic, Ukrainian, Russian, Romanian	variant of Ѕ
Ꚅ ꚅ	Zhwe	Abkhaz (formerly)	
Ꙃ ꙃ	Dzelo	Early Cyrillic alphabet	as variant of, and replaced by Ѕ
Ӡ ӡ	Abkhazian Dze	Abkhaz, Uilta	
Ꚃ ꚃ	Dzwe	Abkhaz (1909–1926)	replaced by Ӡә
Ꙁ ꙁ	Zemlya	Early Cyrillic alphabet	as variant of, and replaced by З
Ԅ ԅ	Komi Zje	Komi (1919–1940)	
Ԇ ԇ	Komi Dzje	Komi (1919–1940)	
І і	Dotted I	Belarusian, Ukrainian, Russian, Kazakh, Khakas, Komi, Rusyn	
Ꙇ ꙇ	Iota	Cyrillic transcription of Glagolitic	
Ј ј	Je	Serbian, Macedonian, Montenegrin, Kildin Sami, Azerbaijani (to 1991), Udmurt (to 1897), Orok	
Ꙉ ꙉ	Djerv	Serbian recension of Church Slavonic	Replaced by Ћ and Ђ
Ԉ ԉ	Komi Lje	Komi (1919–1940)	
Ԛ ԛ	Qa	Old Abkhaz, Kurdish	
ᴫ	Small capital El	Uralic Phonetic Alphabet	
Ꙥ ꙥ	Soft El	Old Church Slavonic	
Ꙧ ꙧ	Soft Em	Old Church Slavonic	
ᵸ	Superscript En	Bezhta, Hunzib, Godoberi	
Ԋ ԋ	Komi Nje	Komi (1919–1940)	
Ө ө	Barred O (Oe)	Bashkir, Buryat, Kalmyk, Kazakh, Khanty, Kyrgyz, Tatar, Tuvan, Mongolian, Yakut, Azerbaijani (to 1991)	
Ꚛ ꚛ	Crossed O	Old Church Slavonic	
Ꙩ ꙩ	Monocular O	Early Cyrillic (14th - 15th centuries)	
Ꙫ ꙫ	Binocular O	Early Cyrillic	Exotic
ꙮ	Multiocular O	Early Cyrillic Appearance changed in Unicode 15.0.	Ex: серафими многоꙮчитїи
Ѻ ѻ	Broad On	Early Cyrillic	Variant of O
Ҁ ҁ	Koppa	Old Church Slavonic	numerical usage only (Replaced by Ч)
Ԍ ԍ	Komi Sje	Komi (1919–1940)	
Ԏ ԏ	Komi Tje	Komi (1919–1940)	
Ᲊ ᲊ	Tje	Khanty	
Ꚍ ꚍ	Twe	Abkhaz	replaced by Тә
Ћ ћ	Tshe	Serbian	
Ү ү	Straight U (Ue)	Kazakh, Mongolian, Karakalpak, Tatar, Bashkir, Kyrgyz, Dungan	
Һ һ	Ha/He, "Shha"	Kazakh, Bashkir, Siberian Tatar, Sakha, Kalmyk	
Ꚕ ꚕ	Hwe	Abkhaz	replaced by Ҳә
Ѡ ѡ	Omega	Early Cyrillic	
Ѽ ѽ	Beautiful Omega	Slavic languages (Historically)	
Ꙍ ꙍ	Broad Omega	Slavic languages (Historically)	
Ꙡ ꙡ	Reversed Tse	Old Novgorodian birchbark	
Ꚏ ꚏ	Tswe	Abkhaz	replaced by Цә
Ҽ ҽ	Abkhazian Che	Abkhaz	
Џ џ	Dzhe	Serbian, Macedonian, Montenegrin, Abkhazian, Romanian	
Ꚗ ꚗ	Shwe	Abkhaz	replaced by Шә
Ꙏ ꙏ	Neutral Yer	Late Medieval Russian transcription	used when yers are indistinguishable from each other
Ѣ ѣ	Yat	Early Cyrillic, Proto-Slavic, Russian (until 1918), Bulgarian (until 1945), Ukrainian (until 1945), Rusyn (until 1945, recurring in 1991)	
Ҩ ҩ	Abkhazian Ha	Abkhaz	
Ꙕ ꙕ	Reversed Yu	Early East Slavic, Early Bulgarian	
Ӏ ӏ	Palochka	Abaza, Adyghe, Avar, Chechen, Dargwa, Ingush, Kabardian, Lak, Lezgian, Tabassaran	
Ѧ ѧ	Little Yus	Common Slavonic, Early Cyrillic	
Ꙙ ꙙ	Closed Little Yus	Common Slavonic, Early Cyrillic, Middle Bulgarian (as variant of little yus)	
Ѫ ѫ	Big Yus	Common Slavonic, Early Cyrillic	
Ꙛ ꙛ	Blended Yus	Middle Bulgarian	
Ѯ ѯ	Ksi	Early Cyrillic, Church Slavonic	Romanized Ks or X
Ѱ ѱ	Psi	Early Cyrillic	
Ѳ ѳ	Fita	Early Cyrillic	cf. Greek Θ θ
Ѵ ѵ	Izhitsa	Udmurt (to 1897), Abkhaz (to 1926), Russian (until 1918 in a few rare Greek words), Serbian (until the 19th century), Church Slavonic	
Ꙟ ꙟ	Yn	Romanian (Cyrillic)	
Оу оу	Uk	Early Cyrillic	
Char (Cyrillic)	Char	Lezgin, Dargin (Peter von Uslar's alphabets)	

== Letters with diacritics ==
Letters with diacritics.
Letter	Name	Languages/alphabets
А̀ а̀	A with grave	Bulgarian, Macedonian (not individual letter, used in Dialects)
А̂ а̂	A with circumflex	Bulgarian, Serbian (not individual letter, used in Dialects), Udege
Ӑ ӑ	A with breve	Chuvash, Khanty
Ӓ ӓ	A with diaeresis	Hill Mari, Kildin Sami, Khanty, Serbian (not individual letter, used in Dialects)
А̄ а̄	A with macron	Kildin Sami, Northern Mansi, Bulgarian (not individual letter, used in Dialects), Serbian (not individual letter, used in Dialects)
А̃ а̃	A with tilde	Khinalug
А̊ а̊	A with ring above	Selkup
Ӓ̄ ӓ̄	A with diaeresis and macron	Kildin Sami
Ә́ ә́	Schwa with acute	Tatar (not individual letter)
Ӛ ӛ	Schwa with diaeresis	Khanty
Ә̃ ә̃	Schwa with tilde	Khinalug
Б҄ б҄	Be with pokrytie	Church Slavonic
В̌ в̌	Ve with caron	Shughni, Wakhi
В҄ в҄	Ve with pokrytie	Church Slavonic
Ґ ґ	Ghe with upturn	Ukrainian, Belarusian (i.e. Belarusian Classical Orthography), (not individual letter, formally), Rusyn
Г̄ г̄	Ghe with macron	Karelian (1820s)
Г̌ г̌	Ghe with caron	Shughni, Wakhi
Г̑ г̑	Ghe with inverted breve	Aleut
Ғ ғ	Ghe with stroke	Kazakh, Uzbek, Bashkir, Tajik, Azerbaijani (to 1991)
Ӻ ӻ	Ghe with stroke and hook	Nivkh
Ғ̌ ғ̌	Ghe with stroke and caron	Shughni
Г̣ г̣	Ghe with dot below	Cyrillization of Arabic
Ҕ ҕ	Ghe with middle hook	Abkhaz, Yakut
Ӷ ӷ	Ghe with descender	Abkhaz, Aleut
Г̧ г̧	Ghe with cedilla	Karelian (1820's), Lezgian, Dargwa, Chechen (Uslar's orthographies)
Г҄ г҄	Ge with pokrytie	Church Slavonic
Д̆ д̆	De with breve	Aleut
Д̣ д̣	De with dot below	Cyrillization of Arabic, Wakhi
Ѓ ѓ	Gje	Macedonian
Ѐ ѐ	Ye with grave	Macedonian, Bulgarian, Serbian, Church Slavonic
Ӗ ӗ	Ye with breve	Chuvash
Ё̄ ё̄	Yo with macron	Northern Mansi
Е̄ е̄	Ye with macron	Northern Mansi, Bulgarian, Serbian
Е̃ е̃	Ye with tilde	Khinalug
Є̈ є̈	Ukrainian Ye with diaeresis	Khanty
Ӂ ӂ	Zhe with breve	Moldavian
Ӝ ӝ	Zhe with diaeresis	Udmurt
Җ җ	Zhe with descender	Dungan, Tatar, Turkmen
Ꚅ̆ꚅ̆	Zhwe with breve	Abkhaz (formerly)
З́ з́	Zje	Montenegrin
Ӟ ӟ	Ze with diaeresis	Udmurt
Ҙ ҙ	Ze with descender	Bashkir, Wakhi
З̌ з̌	Ze with caron	Nganasan, Shughni
З̱ з̠	Ze with macron below	Cyrillization of Arabic
З̣ з̣	Ze with dot below	Cyrillization of Arabic
Ԑ̈ ԑ̈	Reversed Ze with diaeresis	Khanty
Ѝ ѝ	I with grave	Bulgarian, Macedonian, Serbian
Ҋ ҋ	Short I with tail	Kildin Sami
Ӥ ӥ	I with diaeresis	Udmurt, Russian
Ӣ ӣ	I with macron	Northern Mansi, Tajik, Bulgarian, Serbian
И̃ и̃	I with tilde	Khinalug, Godoberi
Ї ї	Yi	Ukrainian, Rusyn, Church Slavonic (almost)
Ї́ ї́	Yi with acute	Ukrainian, Rusyn
Ӄ ӄ	Ka with hook	Aleut, Khanty, Abkhaz (formally)
Ҟ ҟ	Ka with stroke	Abkhaz
Ҝ ҝ	Ka with vertical stroke	Azerbaijani
К҄ к҄	Ka with pokrytie	Church Slavonic
Ԟ ԟ	Aleut Ka	Aleut
Қ қ	Ka with descender	Abkhaz, Kazakh, Khanty, Wakhi
Ҡ ҡ	Bashkir Qa	Bashkir
К̣ к̣	Ka with dot below	Cyrillization of Arabic
Ԓ ԓ	El with hook	Chukchi, Khanty, Itelmen
Ԡ ԡ	El with middle hook	Chuvash (1872)
Ԯ ԯ	El with descender	Khanty
Ӆ ӆ	El with tail	Kildin Sami
Ӎ ӎ	Em with tail	Kildin Sami
Ӈ ӈ	En with hook	Aleut, Kildin Sami, Khanty, Nenets, Northern Mansi
Н҄ н҄	En with pokrytie	Church Slavonic
Ԣ ԣ	En with middle hook	Chuvash (1872), Udmurt (to 1897)
Ԩ ԩ	En with left hook	Orok
Ң ң	En with descender	Dungan, Kazakh, Tatar, Turkmen, Bashkir, Khakasian, Khanty, Uzbek, Kyrgyz
Ӊ ӊ	En with tail	Kildin Sami
О̀ о̀	O with grave	Bulgarian, Serbian, Macedonian
О̄ о̄	O with macron	Carpatho-Rusyn, Northern Mansi
Ӧ ӧ	O with diaeresis	Hill Mari, Meadow Mari, Khakas, Khanty, Udmurt
О̆ о̆	O with breve	Itelmen, Khanty
О̂ о̂	O with circumflex	Udege, Rusyn, Bulgarian
О̃ о̃	O with tilde	Khinalug
Ӧ̄ ӧ̄	O with diaeresis and macron	
Ө́ ө́	Barred O with acute/Oe with acute	Bashkir (not individual letter)
Ӫ ӫ	Barred O with diaeresis/Oe with diaeresis	Khanty
Ө̄ ө̄	Barred O with macron/Oe with macron	Negidal, Orok, Selkup
Ө̆ ө̆	Barred O with breve/Oe with breve	Khanty
Ҧ ҧ	Pe with middle hook	Old orthographies for Abkhaz
Ԥ ԥ	Pe with descender	Abkhaz
Р̌ р̌	Er with caron	Nivkh, Polish (formerly)
Ҏ ҏ	Er with tick	Kildin Sami
Р҄ р҄	Er with pokrytie	Church Slavonic
С́ с́	Sje	Montenegrin
Ҫ ҫ	Es with descender (The)	Bashkir, Chuvash, Nganasan
С̱ с̠	Es with macron below	Cyrillization of Arabic
С̣ с̣	Es with dot below	Cyrillization of Arabic
Ꚋ ꚋ	Te with middle hook	Abkhaz (1909–1926), Chuvash (1872)
Т̌ т̌	Te with caron	Chuvash (1872), Shughni, Wakhi
Ҭ ҭ	Te with descender	Abkhaz
Т̣ т̣	Te with dot below	Cyrillization of Arabic
Ќ ќ	Kje	Macedonian
У̀ у̀	U with grave	Bulgarian (not individual letter, used in Dialects)
У́ у́	U with acute	Russian, Karachay-Balkar (formerly)
Ӳ ӳ	U with double acute	Chuvash
Ў ў	Short U	Belarusian, Dungan, Khanty, Uzbek
Ӱ ӱ	U with diaeresis	Hill Mari, Meadow Mari, Khakas, Khanty, Rusyn
Ӯ ӯ	U with macron	Carpatho-Rusyn (not individual letter), Tajik, Northern Mansi
У̃ у̃	U with tilde	Khinalug
У̊ у̊	U with ring above	Shughni, Lithuanian (1867)
Ӱ́ ӱ́	U with diaeresis and acute	Rusyn
Ұ ұ	Straight U with stroke/Ue with stroke/Kazakh Short U	Kazakh
Ү́ ү́	Straight U with acute/Ue with acute	Mongolian (not individual letter)
Х̑ х̑	Kha with inverted breve	Aleut
Ӽ ӽ	Kha with hook	Aleut, Nivkh, Itelmen, Khanty, Abkhaz (formerly)
Х҄ х҄	Kha with pokrytie	Church Slavonic
Ӿ ӿ	Kha with stroke	Nivkh
Ҳ ҳ	Kha with descender	Abkhaz, Khanty, Tajik, Uzbek, Wakhi
Х̱ х̠	Kha with macron below	Cyrillization of Arabic
Х̣ х̣	Kha with dot below	Cyrillization of Arabic
Х̮ х̮	Kha with breve below	Cyrillization of Arabic
Ԧ ԧ	Shha with descender	Azerbaijani Cyrillic (1939–1991)
Ӵ ӵ	Che with diaeresis	Udmurt
Ҹ ҹ	Che with vertical stroke	Azerbaijani
Ҷ ҷ	Che with descender	Abkhaz, Khanty, Tajik, Wakhi
Ҷ̣ ҷ̣	Che with descender and dot below	Wakhi
Ӌ ӌ	Khakassian Che	Khakas
Ҿ ҿ	Abkhazian Che with descender	Abkhaz
Ш̆ ш̆	Sha with breve	Abkhaz language (Old)
Ъ̀ ъ̀	Hard sign with grave	Bulgarian (not individual letter)
Ꙑ ꙑ	Yery with back yer	Old Church Slavonic, now Ы
Ы̆ ы̆	Yery with breve	Moksha (1923–1938), Mari (old)
Ӹ ӹ	Yery with diaeresis	Hill Mari, Northwestern Mari
Ы̄ ы̄	Yery with macron	Aleut (Bering dialect), Evenki, Northern Mansi, Nanai, Negidal, Ulch, Selkup
Ы̂ ы̂	Yery with circumflex	Udege (formerly)
Ы̃ ы̃	Yery with tilde	Moksha (1890s)
Ҍ ҍ	Semisoft sign	Kildin Sami
Э̄ э̄	E with macron	Aleut (Bering dialect), Evenki, Northern Mansi, Nanai, Negidal, Orok, Ulch, Kildin Sami, Selkup, Chechen
Ӭ ӭ	E with diaeresis	Kildin Sami
Э̆ э̆	E with breve	Tundra Nenets
Ӭ́ ӭ́	E with diaeresis and acute	Kildin Sami
Ӭ̄ ӭ̄	E with diaeresis and macron	Kildin Sami
Э̇ э̇	E with dot above	Tundra Nenets
Ю̀ ю̀	Yu with grave	Bulgarian (not individual letter, used in Dialects)
Ю̆ ю̆	Yu with breve	Khanty
Ю̈ ю̈	Yu with diaeresis	Selkup, Karelian (formerly)
Ю̈́ ю̈́	Yu with diaeresis and acute	Rusyn
Ю̄ ю̄	Yu with macron	Aleut (Bering dialect), Evenki, Northern Mansi, Nanai, Negidal, Orok, Ulch, Kildin Sami, Selkup, Chechen
Ю̂ ю̂	Yu with circumflex	Udege (formerly)
Я̀ я̀	Ya with grave	Bulgarian (not individual letter, used in dialectology)
Я̆ я̆	Ya with breve	Khanty
Я̈ я̈	Ya with diaeresis	Selkup
Я̄ я̄	Ya with macron	Kildin Sami, Udege (formerly), Northern Mansi
Я̂ я̂	Ya with circumflex	Udege (formerly)
Ѷ ѷ	Izhitsa with kendema	(New) Church Slavonic

== Ligatures ==
Ligatures
Letter	Name	Decomposition	Languages/alphabets
Ӕ ӕ	Æ	АЕ	Ossetian
Ԫ ԫ	Dzzhe	ДЖ	Komi
Ꚅ ꚅ	Zhwe	ЗЖ	Abkhaz
Ꚉ ꚉ	Dzze	ДЗ	Abkhaz (replaced by Ӡ), Komi
Љ љ	Lje	ЛЬ	Macedonian, Montenegrin, Serbian
Ԕ ԕ	Lha	ЛХ	Early orthographies for Mordvin (Erzya and Moksha)
Ҥ ҥ	En Ghe	НГ	Altay, Meadow Mari, Yakut
Њ њ	Nje	НЬ	Macedonian, Montenegrin, Serbian
Ꚙ ꚙ	Double O	ОО	Early Cyrillic
Ꙭ ꙭ	Double Monocular O	ꙨꙨ	Early Cyrillic
Ԗ ԗ	Rha	РХ	Early orthographies for Mordvin (Erzya and Moksha)
Ꙋ ꙋ	Monograph Uk	ОУ or ОѴ	Old Church Slavonic
Ѿ ѿ	Ot	ѠТ	Old Church Slavonic
Ҵ ҵ	Te Tse	ТЦ	Abkhaz
Ꚑ ꚑ	Tsse	ТС	Abkhaz (to 1926), Avar (1889)
Ԭ ԭ	Dche	ДЧ	Komi (formerly)
Ꚓ ꚓ	Tche	ТЧ	Abkhaz (1909–1926)
Ꚇ ꚇ	Cche	ЧЧ	Abkhaz (to 1926)
	Che Sha	ЧШ	Udmurt (old)
Ꙓ ꙓ	Iotated Yat	ІѢ	Old Church Slavonic
Ꙗ ꙗ	Iotated A	ІА	Old Church Slavonic
Ԙ ԙ	Yae	ЯЕ	Early orthographies for Mordvin (Erzya and Moksha)
Ѥ ѥ	Iotated E	ІЄ	Old Church Slavonic
Ѩ ѩ	Iotated Little Yus	ІѦ	Old Church Slavonic
Ꙝ ꙝ	Iotated Closed Little Yus	ІꙘ	Old Church Slavonic, Middle Bulgarian as variant of iotated little yus
Ѭ ѭ	Iotated Big Yus	ІѪ	Old Church Slavonic

== Sound values ==
Variants of the Cyrillic script are used by the writing systems of many languages, especially languages used in the countries with the significant presence of Slavic peoples. The tables below list the Cyrillic letters in use in various modern languages and show the primary sounds they represent in them (see the articles on the specific languages for more detail). Letter forms with a combined diacritic which are not considered separate letters in any language (notably vowels with accent marks which are sometimes used in some languages to indicate stress and/or tone) are excluded from the tables, with the exception of ѐ and ѝ. (Note: ѐ and ѝ – considered variants of е and и, respectively, not separate letters – are included here because they are used in some South Slavic languages for preventing ambiguity and have been assigned separate Unicode code points.) The highlighted letters are those of the basic (original) Cyrillic alphabet; archaic letters no longer in use in any language today are not listed.

=== European languages ===
Usage of letters in various languages (Europe)
Language families	Slavic languages							Other Indo-European			Uralic						Caucasian		
Alphabet	ru	be	uk	rue	sr (Note: The letters з́ and с́ only appear in the Montenegrin alphabet, which is otherwise identical to the Serbian alphabet and was not given a separate column.)	bg	mk	mo	os	tg	sjd	mhr	mrj	udm	kca	yrk	ab	kbd	ce
А а	/a/		/ɑ/	/a/								/ɑ/			/a/		/æ/	/ɑ/	
Ӑ ӑ																			
Ӓ ӓ											/ʲa/		/æ/		/ɐ/				
Ә ә															/ɤ~ʌ/		/ʷ/		
Ӛ ӛ															/ɘ/				
Ӕ ӕ									/ɐ/										
Б б	/b/											/β, b/		/b/					
В в	/v/		/ʋ~w/	/v/															
Г г	/ɡ/	/ɣ/	/ɦ/		/ɡ/							/ɣ, ɡ/		/ɡ/	/ɣ, ɡ/	/ɡ/		/ɣ/	/ɡ/
Ґ ґ			/ɡ/		/ɡ/														
Ғ ғ										/ʁ/	/x/								
Ӷ ӷ																	/ɣ~ʁ/		
Ҕ ҕ																	/ɣ/		
Д д	/d/											/ð, d/		/d/					
Ђ ђ					/d͡ʑ/														
Ѓ ѓ							/ɟ~dʑ/												
Е е	/je, e/		/e/								/je, ʲe/	/e/		/je, ʲe/	/e, ʲe, je/	/je, ʲe, e, ɤ/	/ɛ/	/e, ja, aj/	/e, ɛː, je, ie/
Ѐ ѐ							/e/												
Ё ё	/jɵ/ (Note: In normal Russian texts ё is written without the dots, that is it appears as е. The dots are sometimes added to prevent ambiguity or in children books.)	/jɔ/		/jɔ/					/jo/	/jɒ/	/jo, ʲo/	/jo/		/jo, ʲo/				/jo/	
Ӗ ӗ																			
Є є			/je/																
Ж ж	/ʐ/		/ʐ/		/ʐ/	/ʒ/													/ʐ/
Ӂ ӂ								/dʒ/											
Җ җ																			
Ӝ ӝ														/d͡ʒ/					
З з	/z/								/z~ʒ/	/z/									
З́ з́					/zʲ/														
Ҙ ҙ																			
Ӟ ӟ														/dʲʑ/					
Ӡ ӡ																	/dz/		
Ѕ ѕ							/dz/												
И и	/i/		/ɪ/		/i/									/i, ʲi/	/i/			/i~ɨ/	/i/
Ѝ ѝ						/i/													
Ӥ ӥ														/i/					
Ӣ ӣ										/iː/									
І і		/i/																	
Ї ї			/ji/																
Ӏ ӏ																		/ʔ/	/ʢ/
Й й	/j/					/j/		/j/										/j/	
Ҋ ҋ											/j̊/								
Ј ј					/j/		/j/				/j̊/								
К к	/k/																/kʼ/	/k/	
Қ қ										/q/							/kʰ/		
Ҟ ҟ																	/qʼ/		
Ҡ ҡ																			
Ӄ ӄ															/q/				
Ҝ ҝ																			
Л л	/l~ɫ/	/l/				/l~ɫ/		/l/							/l~ɫ/	/l/		/l~ɮ/	/l/
Ӆ ӆ											/l̥/								
Љ љ					/ʎ/		/ʎ/												
М м	/m/																		
Ӎ ӎ											/m̥/								
Н н	/n/																		
Ӊ ӊ											/n̥/								
Ӈ ӈ											/ŋ/				/ŋ/				
Ҥ ҥ												/ŋ/							
Њ њ					/ɲ/		/ɲ/												
О о	/o/	/ɔ/		/o/		/ɔ/		/o/		/ɔ/	/o/						/ɔ/	/o/	
Ӧ ӧ												/ø/		/ʌ/	/ø/				
Ө ө															/ŏ/				
Ӫ ӫ															/ɵ~ɞ/				
Ҩ ҩ																	/ɥ/		
П п	/p/																/pʼ/	/p/	
Ԥ ԥ																	/pʰ/		
Р р	/r/											/r~ɾ/		/r/					
Ҏ ҏ											/r̥/								
С с	/s/								/s~ʃ/	/s/									
С́ с́					/sʲ/														
Ҫ ҫ																			
Т т	/t/																/tʼ/	/t/	
Ҭ ҭ																	/tʰ/		
Ћ ћ					/t͡ɕ/														
Ќ ќ							/c~tɕ/												
У у	/u/																[u]; /w/		/u/
Ў ў		/w/																	
Ӳ ӳ																			
Ӱ ӱ												/y/			/y/				
Ӯ ӯ										/ɵ~ø/									
Ү ү																			
Ұ ұ																			
Ф ф	/f/																		
Х х	/x/							/h/	/χ/		/x/						/χ/	/x/	
Ҳ ҳ										/h/							/ħ/		
Һ һ											/ʰ~h/								
Ц ц	/ts/																		
Ҵ ҵ																	/tsʼ/		
Ч ч	/tɕ/	/ʈʂ/	/ʈ͡ʂ/		/ʈ͡ʂ/	/tʃ/								/tɕ/	/tʃ/	/tɕ/	/tʃʰ/	/tʃ/	
Ӵ ӵ														/tɕ/					
Ҷ ҷ										/dʒ/							/tʃʼ/		
Ӌ ӌ																			
Ҹ ҹ																			
Ҽ ҽ																	/ʈʂ/		
Ҿ ҿ																	/ʈ͡ʂʼ/		
Џ џ					/ɖ͡ʐ/		/dʒ/										/ɖʐ/		
Ш ш	/ʂ/		/ʂ/		/ʂ/	/ʃ/									/ʃ~ʂ/	/ʃ/	/ʂ/	/ʃ/	
Щ щ	/ɕː/		/ʃtʃ/			/ʃt/			/ʂʈ͡ʂ/	(/ʃtʃ/)	/ç/	/ʃtʃ/		/ɕ(ː)/	/ʃtʃ/	/ɕː/		/ɕ/	
Ъ ъ	(Note: In the indicated languages, ъ indicates that the preceding consonant is not iotated.)					/ɤ~ɐ/			(Note: In Ossetian, ъ is combined with consonants to indicate new phonemes, most commonly ejective consonants.)	/ʔ/								/ˠ/	/ʔ/
Ы ы	[ɨ]			/ɨ/				/ɨ/		(/i/)	/ɨ/	/ɤ/		/ɨ~ɯ/	/ɨ/			/ə/	(/i/)
Ӹ ӹ													/ɯ~ə/						
Ь ь	/ʲ/					/ʲ/		/ʲ/	(/ʲ/)		/ʲ/								(Note: In Chechen, ь is combined with both consonants and vowels to indicate various new phonemes.)
Ҍ ҍ											/ʲ/								
Э э	[ɛ]	/ɛ/						/ə/	(/e/)	/e/					/e, ɛː/	/e, æ/			/e/
Ӭ ӭ											/ʲe/								
Ю ю	/ju/					/ju/		/ju/										/ju/	
Я я	/ja/		/jɑ/	/ja/		/ja/		/ja/						/jɑ/	/ja/	/jɑ/		/ja/	
Alphabet	ru	be	uk	rue	sr	bg	mk	mo	os	tg	sjd	mhr	mrj	udm	kca	yrk	ab	kbd	ce

=== Asian languages ===
Usage of letters in various languages (Asia)
Language families	Turkic languages														Tung.	Mongolic			Chin.
Alphabet	az	tk	kk	ky	krc	ba	tt	alt	kjh	sah	tyv	uz	ug	cv	evn	bua	mn	xal	dng
А а	/ɑ/	/a/	/ɑ/		/a/, /æ/	/a/	/ɑ/			/a/	/ɑ/	/a~æ/	/ɑ/	/a/					/a, ɑ/
Ӑ ӑ														/ə/					
Ӓ ӓ																			
Ә ә	/æ/					/æ/							/æ/					/æ/	/ɤ/
Ӛ ӛ																			
Ӕ ӕ																			
Б б	/b/										/b~p/	/b/			/w/	/b/	/p/		
В в	/v/	/β/	(/v/)		/v/	/w/	/w/, /v/	(/v/)	/v/	(/v/)		/v/, /w/	/w/ (/v/)	/ʋ/	/v/	(/w~β/)	/w̜/	/w/	
Г г	/ɡ/	/ɡ~ʁ/	/ɡ/				/ɡ/, /ɣ/		/ɡ/						/ɡ/, /ɣ/	/ɡ/	/ɡ/, /ɢ/		/k/
Ґ ґ																			
Ѓ ѓ																			
Ғ ғ	/ɣ/		/ʁ/			/ɣ/			/ɣ/			/ɣ/	/ʁ/						
Ӷ ӷ																			
Ҕ ҕ										/ɣ~ʁ/									
Д д	/d/										/d~t/	/d/					/t/		
Ђ ђ																			
Е е	/e/		/iɘ/	/je, e/	/e/	/e/	/e/, /je/, /jɤ/	/e/	/je, e/	(/e/, /je/)	/e, je/	/ɛ/, /jɛ/	/e/	/ɛ/	/je/		/ji~jo/	/je/	/iɛ/
Ѐ ѐ																			
Ё ё		/jo/	(/jo/)	/jo/	/ø/	/jo/		(/jo/)	/jo/	(/jo/)		(/jɔ/)		(/jo/)	/jo/		/jɔ/		/iɔ/
Ӗ ӗ														/ɘ/					
Ҽ ҽ																			
Ҿ ҿ																			
Є є																			
Ж ж	/ʒ/			/dʒ/	/dʒ/, /ʒ/	/ʒ/				(/ʒ/)	/ʒ/	/dʒ/	/ʒ/	/ʐ/	/ʒ/		/tʃ/		/ʐ/
Ӂ ӂ																			
Җ җ		/dʒ/					/ʑ/						/dʒ/					/dʒ/	/tʂ, tɕ/
Ӝ ӝ																			
З з	/z/	/ð/	/z/							(/z/)	/z/						/ts/		
З́ з́																			
Ҙ ҙ						/ð/													
Ӟ ӟ																			
Ӡ ӡ																			
Ѕ ѕ																			
И и	/i/											/ɪ/	/ɪ/, /ɯ/	/i/					/i, ei/
Ѝ ѝ																			
Ӥ ӥ																			
Ӣ ӣ																			
І і			/ɘ/						/ɪ/										
Ї ї																			
Ӏ ӏ																			
Й й	/j/									/j/, /ȷ̃/	/j/							/i/	/j/
Ҋ ҋ																			
Ј ј	/j/							/ɟ/											
К к	/c/ (/k/)	/k~q/	/k/	/k~q/	/k/		/k/, /q/	/k/		/k~q/	/k/					(/k/)	/kʰ~x/	(/k/)	/kʰ/
Қ қ			/q/									/q/							
Ҟ ҟ																			
Ҡ ҡ						/q/													
Ӄ ӄ																			
Ҝ ҝ	/ɟ/																		
Л л	/l/																/ɮ/		/l/
Ӆ ӆ																			
Љ љ																			
М м	/m/																		
Ӎ ӎ																			
Н н	/n/																		
Ӊ ӊ																			
Ң ң		/ŋ/				/ŋ/			/ŋ/		/ŋ/		/ŋ/					/ŋ/	
Ӈ ӈ															/ŋ/				
Ҥ ҥ								/ŋ/		/ŋ/									
Њ њ																			
О о	/o/		/uʊ/	/o/								/ɔ/	/o/		/ɔ/				
Ӧ ӧ								/ø/											
Ө ө	/ø/		/yʉ/	/ø/		/ø/				/ø/			/ø/			/ø/	/o/		
Ӫ ӫ																			
Ҩ ҩ																			
П п	/p/										/p~pʰ/	/p/				(/p/)	(/pʰ/)		/pʰ/
Ԥ ԥ																			
Р р	/ɾ/	/r/	/ɾ/	/r/				/ɾ/	/r/	/ɾ/			/r/						/ɚ, r/
Ҏ ҏ																			
С с	/s/	/θ/	/s/																
С́ с́																			
Ҫ ҫ						/θ/								/ɕ/					
Т т	/t/										/t~tʰ/	/t/					/tʰ/		
Ҭ ҭ																			
Ћ ћ																			
Ќ ќ																			
У у	/u/		/w~ʊ~ʉ/	/u/			/u/, /w/	/u/									/ʊ/		/ɤu, u/
Ў ў					/w/							/o/							/u/
Ӳ ӳ														/y/					
Ӱ ӱ								/y/											
Ӯ ӯ																			
Ү ү	/y/		/ʉ/	/y/		/y/	/y/, /w/			/y/			/ʏ/			/y/	/u/		/y/
Ұ ұ			/ʊ/																
Ф ф	/f/	/ɸ/	(/f/)		/f/				/ɸ/	(/f/)		/f~ɸ/	(/f/)	/f/		(/f/)	(/f~pʰ/)	(/f/)	/f/
Х х	/x~χ/	/h~x/	(/x/)		/h/	/x/								/χ/	/x/				
Ҳ ҳ												/h/							
Һ һ	/h/		/h/			/h/				/h/			/h/			/h/		/h/	
Ц ц		(/ts/)	(/t͡s/)	(/ts/)		/t͡s/		(/ts/)	/t͡s/	(/ts/)	(/t͡s/)	(/ts/)		(/ts/)	/ts/	(/ts/)	/t͡sʰ/		
Ҵ ҵ																			
Ч ч	/tʃ/		(/tɕ/)	/tʃ/			/ɕ/	(/tʃ/)	/tʃ/	/c/	/tʃ/			/tɕ/	/tʃ/	(/tʃ/)	/tʃʰ/		/tʂʰ, tɕʰ/
Ӵ ӵ																			
Ҷ ҷ																			
Ӌ ӌ									/dʒ/										
Ҹ ҹ	/dʒ/																		
Џ џ																			
Ш ш	/ʃ/									(/ʃ/)	/ʃ/			/ʂ/	/ʃ/				/ʂ/
Щ щ		(/ʃtʃ/)	(/ɕ/)	/ʃtʃ, ʃː/	(/ʃ/)	/ɕ/	/ʃɕ/	(/ʃtʃ/)	/ɕː/	(/ɕː/)	(/ʃtʃ/)		(/ɕː/, /ɕtɕ/)		(/ʃtʃ/)				/ɕ/
Ъ ъ		(Note: Only used in borrowings, not in native words.)				/ʲ/	/ʔ/				/ˤ/	[ʔ]							
Ы ы	/ɯ/		/ə/	/ɯ/	/ɨ/	/ɯ/	/ɤ/	/ɯ/						/ɯ/	/i/	/ʉ/	/i/		/ɪ, ɨə/
Ӹ ӹ																			
Ь ь						/ʲ/	/ʔ/	/ʲ/		/ʲ/|				/ʲ/					
Ҍ ҍ																			
Э э		/e/	(/e/)	/e/	/e/, /æ/	/e/	/e/, /ʔ/	(/e/)	/e/			/ɛ/		/e/		/ɛ/	/e/		/ɛ/
Ӭ ӭ																			
Ю ю		/ju/	/jʉw/, /jʊw/	/ju, jy/	/y/	/ju/	/ju/, /jy/	(/ju/)	/ju/	(/ju/)					/ju/		/ju, jʊ/	/jʊ/	/iɤu/
Я я		/ja/	/jɑ/	/ja, jɑ/	/æ/	/ja/	/ja/, /jæ/	(/jɑ/)	/ja/	(/ja/)			(/jɑ/)	(/ja/)	/ja/				/ia, iɑ/
Alphabet	az	tk	kk	ky	krc	ba	tt	alt	kjh	sah	tyv	uz	ug	cv	bua	mn	xal	evn	dng

== Summary table ==
Cyrillic alphabets comparison table
Early scripts
Church Slavonic	А		Б	В	Г		Д	Ꙉ	Ѕ	Е			Ж		З Ꙁ		И	І	Ꙇ	Ї	Й	К		Л		М		Н			О Ѡ		П		Р		С		Т		Оу Ꙋ			Ф	Х		Ц		Ч		Ш	Щ	Ъ	Ꙑ Ы	Ѣ	Ь			Ю	Ꙗ			Ѥ	Ѧ	Ѩ	Ѫ	Ѭ	Ѯ	Ѱ	Ѳ	Ѵ	Ҁ
Most common shared letters
Common	А		Б	В	Г		Д			Е			Ж		З		И				Й	К		Л		М		Н			О		П		Р		С		Т		У			Ф	Х		Ц		Ч		Ш	Щ				Ь			Ю	Я												
South Slavic languages
Bulgarian	А		Б	В	Г		Д	Дж	Дз	Е			Ж		З		И				Й	К		Л		М		Н			О		П		Р		С		Т		У			Ф	Х		Ц		Ч	Дж	Ш	Щ	Ъ			Ь			Ю	Я												
Macedonian	А		Б	В	Г		Д	Ѓ	Ѕ	Е			Ж		З		И		Ј			К		Л	Љ	М		Н	Њ		О		П		Р		С		Т	Ќ	У			Ф	Х		Ц		Ч	Џ	Ш		’																			
Serbian	А		Б	В	Г		Д	Ђ		Е			Ж		З		И		Ј			К		Л	Љ	М		Н	Њ		О		П		Р		С		Т	Ћ	У			Ф	Х		Ц		Ч	Џ	Ш		’																			
Montenegrin	А		Б	В	Г		Д	Ђ		Е			Ж		З	З́	И		Ј			К		Л	Љ	М		Н	Њ		О		П		Р		С	С́	Т	Ћ	У			Ф	Х		Ц		Ч	Џ	Ш		’																			
East Slavic languages
Russian	А		Б	В	Г		Д			Е		Ё	Ж		З		И				Й	К		Л		М		Н			О		П		Р		С		Т		У			Ф	Х		Ц		Ч		Ш	Щ	Ъ	Ы		Ь	Э		Ю	Я												
Belarusian	А		Б	В	Г	Ґ	Д			Е		Ё	Ж		З			І			Й	К		Л		М		Н			О		П		Р		С		Т		У	Ў		Ф	Х		Ц		Ч		Ш		’	Ы		Ь	Э		Ю	Я												
Ukrainian	А		Б	В	Г	Ґ	Д			Е	Є		Ж		З		И	І		Ї	Й	К		Л		М		Н			О		П		Р		С		Т		У			Ф	Х		Ц		Ч		Ш	Щ	’			Ь			Ю	Я												
Rusyn	А		Б	В	Г	Ґ	Д			Е	Є	Ё	Ж		З		И	І		Ї	Й	К		Л		М		Н			О		П		Р		С		Т		У			Ф	Х		Ц		Ч		Ш	Щ	Ъ	Ы		Ь			Ю	Я												
Iranian languages
Kurdish	А		Б	В	Г	Г'	Д			Е	Ә	Ә'	Ж		З		И				Й	К	К'	Л		М		Н			О	Ö	П	П'	Р	Р'	С		Т	Т'	У			Ф	Х	Һ	Һ'		Ч	Ч'	Ш	Щ				Ь	Э				Ԛ	Ԝ										
Ossetian	А	Ӕ	Б	В	Г	Гъ	Д	Дж	Дз	Е		Ё	Ж		З		И				Й	К	Къ	Л		М		Н			О		П	Пъ	Р		С		Т	Тъ	У			Ф	Х	Хъ	Ц	Цъ	Ч	Чъ	Ш	Щ	Ъ	Ы		Ь	Э		Ю	Я												
Tajik	А		Б	В	Г	Ғ	Д			Е		Ё	Ж		З		И		Ӣ		Й	К	Қ	Л		М		Н			О		П		Р		С		Т		У	Ӯ		Ф	Х	Ҳ			Ч	Ҷ	Ш		Ъ				Э		Ю	Я												
Romance languages
Moldovan	А		Б	В	Г		Д			Е			Ж	Ӂ	З		И				Й	К		Л		М		Н			О		П		Р		С		Т		У			Ф	Х		Ц		Ч		Ш			Ы		Ь	Э		Ю	Я												
Uralic languages
Komi-Permyak	А		Б	В	Г		Д			Е		Ё	Ж		З		И	І			Й	К		Л		М		Н			О	Ӧ	П		Р		С		Т		У			Ф	Х		Ц		Ч		Ш	Щ	Ъ	Ы		Ь	Э		Ю	Я												
Meadow Mari	А		Б	В	Г		Д			Е		Ё	Ж		З		И				Й	К		Л		М		Н	Ҥ		О	Ӧ	П		Р		С		Т		У	Ӱ		Ф	Х		Ц		Ч		Ш	Щ	Ъ	Ы		Ь	Э		Ю	Я												
Hill Mari	А	Ӓ	Б	В	Г		Д			Е		Ё	Ж		З		И				Й	К		Л		М		Н			О	Ӧ	П		Р		С		Т		У	Ӱ		Ф	Х		Ц		Ч		Ш	Щ	Ъ	Ы	Ӹ	Ь	Э		Ю	Я												
Kildin Sami	А	Ӓ	Б	В	Г		Д			Е		Ё	Ж		З		И		Й	Ҋ	Ј	К		Л	Ӆ	М	Ӎ	Н	Ӊ	Ӈ	О		П		Р	Ҏ	С		Т		У			Ф	Х	Һ	Ц		Ч		Ш	Щ	Ъ	Ы	Ь	Ҍ	Э	Ӭ	Ю	Я												
Turkic languages
Azerbaijani	А		Б	В	Г	Ғ	Д			Е	Ә	Ё	Ж		З		И	Ј			Й	К	Ҝ	Л		М		Н			О	Ө	П		Р		С		Т		У		Ү	Ф	Х	Һ	Ц		Ч	Ҹ	Ш	Щ	Ъ	Ы		Ь	Э		Ю	Я												
Bashkir	А	Ә	Б	В	Г	Ғ	Д		Ҙ	Е		Ё	Ж		З		И				Й	К	Ҡ	Л		М		Н	Ҥ		О	Ө	П		Р		С	Ҫ	Т		У		Ү	Ф	Х	Һ	Ц		Ч		Ш	Щ	Ъ	Ы		Ь	Э	Ә	Ю	Я												
Chuvash	А	Ӑ	Б	В	Г		Д			Е	Ё	Ӗ	Ж		З		И				Й	К		Л		М		Н			О		П		Р		С	Ҫ	Т		У	Ӳ		Ф	Х		Ц		Ч		Ш	Щ	Ъ	Ы		Ь	Э		Ю	Я												
Kazakh	А	Ә	Б	В	Г	Ғ	Д			Е		Ё	Ж		З		И	І			Й	К	Қ	Л		М		Н	Ң		О	Ө	П		Р		С		Т		У	Ұ	Ү	Ф	Х	Һ	Ц		Ч		Ш	Щ	Ъ	Ы		Ь	Э		Ю	Я												
Kyrgyz	А		Б	В	Г		Д			Е		Ё	Ж		З		И				Й	К		Л		М		Н	Ң		О	Ө	П		Р		С		Т		У		Ү	Ф	Х				Ч		Ш			Ы			Э		Ю	Я												
Tatar	А	Ә	Б	В	Г		Д			Е		Ё	Ж	Җ	З		И				Й	К		Л		М		Н	Ң		О	Ө	П		Р		С		Т		У		Ү	Ф	Х	Һ	Ц		Ч		Ш	Щ	Ъ	Ы		Ь	Э		Ю	Я												
Uzbek	А		Б	В	Г	Ғ	Д			Е		Ё	Ж		З		И				Й	К	Қ	Л		М		Н			О		П		Р		С		Т		У	Ў		Ф	Х	Ҳ			Ч		Ш		Ъ				Э		Ю	Я												
Uyghur	А	Ә	Б	В	Г	Ғ	Д			Е		Ё	Ж	Җ	З		И				Й	К	Қ	Л		М		Н	Ң		О	Ө	П		Р		С		Т		У		Ү	Ф	Х	Һ	Ц		Ч		Ш		Ъ						Ю	Я												
Mongolian languages
Buryat	А		Б	В	Г		Д			Е		Ё	Ж		З		И				Й			Л		М		Н			О	Ө	П		Р		С		Т		У		Ү	Ф	Х	Һ	Ц		Ч		Ш			Ы		Ь	Э		Ю	Я												
Khalkha	А		Б	В	Г		Д			Е		Ё	Ж		З		И				Й	К		Л		М		Н			О	Ө	П		Р		С		Т		У		Ү	Ф	Х		Ц		Ч		Ш	Щ	Ъ	Ы		Ь	Э		Ю	Я												
Kalmyk	А	Ә	Б	В	Г	Һ	Д			Е			Ж	Җ	З		И				Й	К		Л		М		Н	Ң		О	Ө	П		Р		С		Т		У		Ү	Ф	Х		Ц		Ч		Ш					Ь	Э		Ю	Я												
Caucasian languages
Abkhaz	А		Б	В	Г	Ҕ	Д		Џ	Е	Ҽ	Ҿ	Ж	Жә	З	Ӡ Ӡә	И			Й	К	Қ	Ҟ	Л		М		Н			О	Ҩ	П	Ҧ	Р		С		Т Тә	Ҭ Ҭә	У			Ф	Х	Ҳ Ҳә	Ц Цә	Ҵ Ҵә	Ч	Ҷ	Ш Шә	Щ		Ы																		
Sino-Tibetan languages
Dungan	А		Б	В	Г		Д			Е		Ё	Ж	Җ	З		И				Й	К		Л		М		Н	Ң	Ә	О		П		Р		С		Т		У	Ў	Ү	Ф	Х		Ц		Ч		Ш	Щ	Ъ	Ы		Ь	Э		Ю	Я												

== See also ==
- Cyrillic script
- Cyrillic digraphs
- Cyrillic characters in Unicode
- Languages using Cyrillic
- List of Cyrillic multigraphs
- List of Latin letters
