= Cyrillic (Unicode block) =

- Range: U+0400..U+04FF (256 code points)
- Plane: BMP
- Scripts: Cyrillic (254 characters); Inherited (2 characters)
- Major alphabets: Russian; Ukrainian; Belarusian; Bulgarian; Serbian; Macedonian; Abkhaz
- Assigned: 256 code points
- Unused: 0 reserved code points
- Source standards: ISO 8859-5

Unicode Version History
- 1.0.0 (1991): 192 (+192)
- 1.0.1 (1992): 188 (-4)
- 1.1 (1993): 226 (+38)
- 3.0 (1999): 238 (+12)
- 3.2 (2002): 246 (+8)
- 4.1 (2005): 248 (+2)
- 5.0 (2006): 255 (+7)
- 5.1 (2008): 256 (+1)

Unicode documentation
- Code chart ∣ Web page
- Note: Four characters (two upper and lower case letter pairs) were removed from the Cyrillic block in version 1.0.1 during the process of unifying with ISO 10646.

Cyrillic is a Unicode block containing the characters used to write the most widely used languages with a Cyrillic orthography. The core of the block is based on the ISO 8859-5 standard, with additions for minority languages and historic orthographies.

== Block ==
Cyrillic^{[1]} Official Unicode Consortium code chart (PDF)
	0	1	2	3	4	5	6	7	8	9	A	B	C	D	E	F
U+040x	Ѐ	Ё	Ђ	Ѓ	Є	Ѕ	І	Ї	Ј	Љ	Њ	Ћ	Ќ	Ѝ	Ў	Џ
U+041x	А	Б	В	Г	Д	Е	Ж	З	И	Й	К	Л	М	Н	О	П
U+042x	Р	С	Т	У	Ф	Х	Ц	Ч	Ш	Щ	Ъ	Ы	Ь	Э	Ю	Я
U+043x	а	б	в	г	д	е	ж	з	и	й	к	л	м	н	о	п
U+044x	р	с	т	у	ф	х	ц	ч	ш	щ	ъ	ы	ь	э	ю	я
U+045x	ѐ	ё	ђ	ѓ	є	ѕ	і	ї	ј	љ	њ	ћ	ќ	ѝ	ў	џ
U+046x	Ѡ	ѡ	Ѣ	ѣ	Ѥ	ѥ	Ѧ	ѧ	Ѩ	ѩ	Ѫ	ѫ	Ѭ	ѭ	Ѯ	ѯ
U+047x	Ѱ	ѱ	Ѳ	ѳ	Ѵ	ѵ	Ѷ	ѷ	Ѹ	ѹ	Ѻ	ѻ	Ѽ	ѽ	Ѿ	ѿ
U+048x	Ҁ	ҁ	҂	◌҃	◌҄	◌҅	◌҆	◌҇	◌҈	◌҉	Ҋ	ҋ	Ҍ	ҍ	Ҏ	ҏ
U+049x	Ґ	ґ	Ғ	ғ	Ҕ	ҕ	Җ	җ	Ҙ	ҙ	Қ	қ	Ҝ	ҝ	Ҟ	ҟ
U+04Ax	Ҡ	ҡ	Ң	ң	Ҥ	ҥ	Ҧ	ҧ	Ҩ	ҩ	Ҫ	ҫ	Ҭ	ҭ	Ү	ү
U+04Bx	Ұ	ұ	Ҳ	ҳ	Ҵ	ҵ	Ҷ	ҷ	Ҹ	ҹ	Һ	һ	Ҽ	ҽ	Ҿ	ҿ
U+04Cx	Ӏ	Ӂ	ӂ	Ӄ	ӄ	Ӆ	ӆ	Ӈ	ӈ	Ӊ	ӊ	Ӌ	ӌ	Ӎ	ӎ	ӏ
U+04Dx	Ӑ	ӑ	Ӓ	ӓ	Ӕ	ӕ	Ӗ	ӗ	Ә	ә	Ӛ	ӛ	Ӝ	ӝ	Ӟ	ӟ
U+04Ex	Ӡ	ӡ	Ӣ	ӣ	Ӥ	ӥ	Ӧ	ӧ	Ө	ө	Ӫ	ӫ	Ӭ	ӭ	Ӯ	ӯ
U+04Fx	Ӱ	ӱ	Ӳ	ӳ	Ӵ	ӵ	Ӷ	ӷ	Ӹ	ӹ	Ӻ	ӻ	Ӽ	ӽ	Ӿ	ӿ
Notes 1.As of Unicode version 17.0

== List of characters ==
- U+0400 Ѐ CYRILLIC CAPITAL LETTER IE WITH GRAVE
- U+0401 Ё CYRILLIC CAPITAL LETTER IO (&IOcy;)
- U+0402 Ђ CYRILLIC CAPITAL LETTER DJE (&DJcy;)
- U+0403 Ѓ CYRILLIC CAPITAL LETTER GJE (&GJcy;)
- U+0404 Є CYRILLIC CAPITAL LETTER UKRAINIAN IE (&Jukcy;)
- U+0405 Ѕ CYRILLIC CAPITAL LETTER DZE (&DScy;)
- U+0406 І CYRILLIC CAPITAL LETTER BYELORUSSIAN-UKRAINIAN I (&Iukcy;)
- U+0407 Ї CYRILLIC CAPITAL LETTER YI (&YIcy;)
- U+0408 Ј CYRILLIC CAPITAL LETTER JE (&Jsercy;)
- U+0409 Љ CYRILLIC CAPITAL LETTER LJE (&LJcy;)
- U+040A Њ CYRILLIC CAPITAL LETTER NJE (&NJcy;)
- U+040B Ћ CYRILLIC CAPITAL LETTER TSHE (&TSHcy;)
- U+040C Ќ CYRILLIC CAPITAL LETTER KJE (&KJcy;)
- U+040D Ѝ CYRILLIC CAPITAL LETTER I WITH GRAVE
- U+040E Ў CYRILLIC CAPITAL LETTER SHORT U (&Ubrcy;)
- U+040F Џ CYRILLIC CAPITAL LETTER DZHE (&DZcy;)
- U+0410 А CYRILLIC CAPITAL LETTER A (&Acy;)
- U+0411 Б CYRILLIC CAPITAL LETTER BE (&Bcy;)
- U+0412 В CYRILLIC CAPITAL LETTER VE (&Vcy;)
- U+0413 Г CYRILLIC CAPITAL LETTER GHE (&Gcy;)
- U+0414 Д CYRILLIC CAPITAL LETTER DE (&Dcy;)
- U+0415 Е CYRILLIC CAPITAL LETTER IE (&IEcy;)
- U+0416 Ж CYRILLIC CAPITAL LETTER ZHE (&ZHcy;)
- U+0417 З CYRILLIC CAPITAL LETTER ZE (&Zcy;)
- U+0418 И CYRILLIC CAPITAL LETTER I (&Icy;)
- U+0419 Й CYRILLIC CAPITAL LETTER SHORT I (&Jcy;)
- U+041A К CYRILLIC CAPITAL LETTER KA (&Kcy;)
- U+041B Л CYRILLIC CAPITAL LETTER EL (&Lcy;)
- U+041C М CYRILLIC CAPITAL LETTER EM (&Mcy;)
- U+041D Н CYRILLIC CAPITAL LETTER EN (&Ncy;)
- U+041E О CYRILLIC CAPITAL LETTER O (&Ocy;)
- U+041F П CYRILLIC CAPITAL LETTER PE (&Pcy;)
- U+0420 Р CYRILLIC CAPITAL LETTER ER (&Rcy;)
- U+0421 С CYRILLIC CAPITAL LETTER ES (&Scy;)
- U+0422 Т CYRILLIC CAPITAL LETTER TE (&Tcy;)
- U+0423 У CYRILLIC CAPITAL LETTER U (&Ucy;)
- U+0424 Ф CYRILLIC CAPITAL LETTER EF (&Fcy;)
- U+0425 Х CYRILLIC CAPITAL LETTER HA (&KHcy;)
- U+0426 Ц CYRILLIC CAPITAL LETTER TSE (&TScy;)
- U+0427 Ч CYRILLIC CAPITAL LETTER CHE (&CHcy;)
- U+0428 Ш CYRILLIC CAPITAL LETTER SHA (&SHcy;)
- U+0429 Щ CYRILLIC CAPITAL LETTER SHCHA (&SHCHcy;)
- U+042A Ъ CYRILLIC CAPITAL LETTER HARD SIGN (&HARDcy;)
- U+042B Ы CYRILLIC CAPITAL LETTER YERU (&Ycy;)
- U+042C Ь CYRILLIC CAPITAL LETTER SOFT SIGN (&SOFTcy;)
- U+042D Э CYRILLIC CAPITAL LETTER E (&Ecy;)
- U+042E Ю CYRILLIC CAPITAL LETTER YU (&YUcy;)
- U+042F Я CYRILLIC CAPITAL LETTER YA (&YAcy;)
- U+0430 а CYRILLIC SMALL LETTER A (&acy;)
- U+0431 б CYRILLIC SMALL LETTER BE (&bcy;)
- U+0432 в CYRILLIC SMALL LETTER VE (&vcy;)
- U+0433 г CYRILLIC SMALL LETTER GHE (&gcy;)
- U+0434 д CYRILLIC SMALL LETTER DE (&dcy;)
- U+0435 е CYRILLIC SMALL LETTER IE (&iecy;)
- U+0436 ж CYRILLIC SMALL LETTER ZHE (&zhcy;)
- U+0437 з CYRILLIC SMALL LETTER ZE (&zcy;)
- U+0438 и CYRILLIC SMALL LETTER I (&icy;)
- U+0439 й CYRILLIC SMALL LETTER SHORT I (&jcy;)
- U+043A к CYRILLIC SMALL LETTER KA (&kcy;)
- U+043B л CYRILLIC SMALL LETTER EL (&lcy;)
- U+043C м CYRILLIC SMALL LETTER EM (&mcy;)
- U+043D н CYRILLIC SMALL LETTER EN (&ncy;)
- U+043E о CYRILLIC SMALL LETTER O (&ocy;)
- U+043F п CYRILLIC SMALL LETTER PE (&pcy;)
- U+0440 р CYRILLIC SMALL LETTER ER (&rcy;)
- U+0441 с CYRILLIC SMALL LETTER ES (&scy;)
- U+0442 т CYRILLIC SMALL LETTER TE (&tcy;)
- U+0443 у CYRILLIC SMALL LETTER U (&ucy;)
- U+0444 ф CYRILLIC SMALL LETTER EF (&fcy;)
- U+0445 х CYRILLIC SMALL LETTER HA (&khcy;)
- U+0446 ц CYRILLIC SMALL LETTER TSE (&tscy;)
- U+0447 ч CYRILLIC SMALL LETTER CHE (&chcy;)
- U+0448 ш CYRILLIC SMALL LETTER SHA (&shcy;)
- U+0449 щ CYRILLIC SMALL LETTER SHCHA (&shchcy;)
- U+044A ъ CYRILLIC SMALL LETTER HARD SIGN (&hardcy;)
- U+044B ы CYRILLIC SMALL LETTER YERU (&ycy;)
- U+044C ь CYRILLIC SMALL LETTER SOFT SIGN (&softcy;)
- U+044D э CYRILLIC SMALL LETTER E (&ecy;)
- U+044E ю CYRILLIC SMALL LETTER YU (&yucy;)
- U+044F я CYRILLIC SMALL LETTER YA (&yacy;)
- U+0450 ѐ CYRILLIC SMALL LETTER IE WITH GRAVE
- U+0451 ё CYRILLIC SMALL LETTER IO (&iocy;)
- U+0452 ђ CYRILLIC SMALL LETTER DJE (&djcy;)
- U+0453 ѓ CYRILLIC SMALL LETTER GJE (&gjcy;)
- U+0454 є CYRILLIC SMALL LETTER UKRAINIAN IE (&jukcy;)
- U+0455 ѕ CYRILLIC SMALL LETTER DZE (&dscy;)
- U+0456 і CYRILLIC SMALL LETTER BYELORUSSIAN-UKRAINIAN I (&iukcy;)
- U+0457 ї CYRILLIC SMALL LETTER YI (&yicy;)
- U+0458 ј CYRILLIC SMALL LETTER JE (&jsercy;)
- U+0459 љ CYRILLIC SMALL LETTER LJE (&ljcy;)
- U+045A њ CYRILLIC SMALL LETTER NJE (&njcy;)
- U+045B ћ CYRILLIC SMALL LETTER TSHE (&tshcy;)
- U+045C ќ CYRILLIC SMALL LETTER KJE (&kjcy;)
- U+045D ѝ CYRILLIC SMALL LETTER I WITH GRAVE
- U+045E ў CYRILLIC SMALL LETTER SHORT U (&ubrcy;)
- U+045F џ CYRILLIC SMALL LETTER DZHE (&dzcy;)
- U+0460 Ѡ CYRILLIC CAPITAL LETTER OMEGA
- U+0461 ѡ CYRILLIC SMALL LETTER OMEGA
- U+0462 Ѣ CYRILLIC CAPITAL LETTER YAT
- U+0463 ѣ CYRILLIC SMALL LETTER YAT
- U+0464 Ѥ CYRILLIC CAPITAL LETTER IOTIFIED E
- U+0465 ѥ CYRILLIC SMALL LETTER IOTIFIED E
- U+0466 Ѧ CYRILLIC CAPITAL LETTER LITTLE YUS
- U+0467 ѧ CYRILLIC SMALL LETTER LITTLE YUS
- U+0468 Ѩ CYRILLIC CAPITAL LETTER IOTIFIED LITTLE YUS
- U+0469 ѩ CYRILLIC SMALL LETTER IOTIFIED LITTLE YUS
- U+046A Ѫ CYRILLIC CAPITAL LETTER BIG YUS
- U+046B ѫ CYRILLIC SMALL LETTER BIG YUS
- U+046C Ѭ CYRILLIC CAPITAL LETTER IOTIFIED BIG YUS
- U+046D ѭ CYRILLIC SMALL LETTER IOTIFIED BIG YUS
- U+046E Ѯ CYRILLIC CAPITAL LETTER KSI
- U+046F ѯ CYRILLIC SMALL LETTER KSI
- U+0470 Ѱ CYRILLIC CAPITAL LETTER PSI
- U+0471 ѱ CYRILLIC SMALL LETTER PSI
- U+0472 Ѳ CYRILLIC CAPITAL LETTER FITA
- U+0473 ѳ CYRILLIC SMALL LETTER FITA
- U+0474 Ѵ CYRILLIC CAPITAL LETTER IZHITSA
- U+0475 ѵ CYRILLIC SMALL LETTER IZHITSA
- U+0476 Ѷ CYRILLIC CAPITAL LETTER IZHITSA WITH DOUBLE GRAVE ACCENT
- U+0477 ѷ CYRILLIC SMALL LETTER IZHITSA WITH DOUBLE GRAVE ACCENT
- U+0478 Ѹ CYRILLIC CAPITAL LETTER UK
- U+0479 ѹ CYRILLIC SMALL LETTER UK
- U+047A Ѻ CYRILLIC CAPITAL LETTER ROUND OMEGA
- U+047B ѻ CYRILLIC SMALL LETTER ROUND OMEGA
- U+047C Ѽ CYRILLIC CAPITAL LETTER OMEGA WITH TITLO
- U+047D ѽ CYRILLIC SMALL LETTER OMEGA WITH TITLO
- U+047E Ѿ CYRILLIC CAPITAL LETTER OT
- U+047F ѿ CYRILLIC SMALL LETTER OT
- U+0480 Ҁ CYRILLIC CAPITAL LETTER KOPPA
- U+0481 ҁ CYRILLIC SMALL LETTER KOPPA
- U+0482 ҂ CYRILLIC THOUSANDS SIGN
- U+0483 ҃ COMBINING CYRILLIC TITLO
- U+0484 ҄ COMBINING CYRILLIC PALATALIZATION
- U+0485 ҅ COMBINING CYRILLIC DASIA PNEUMATA
- U+0486 ҆ COMBINING CYRILLIC PSILI PNEUMATA
- U+0487 ҇ COMBINING CYRILLIC POKRYTIE
- U+0488 ҈ COMBINING CYRILLIC HUNDRED THOUSANDS SIGN
- U+0489 ҉ COMBINING CYRILLIC MILLIONS SIGN
- U+048A Ҋ CYRILLIC CAPITAL LETTER SHORT I WITH TAIL
- U+048B ҋ CYRILLIC SMALL LETTER SHORT I WITH TAIL
- U+048C Ҍ CYRILLIC CAPITAL LETTER SEMISOFT SIGN
- U+048D ҍ CYRILLIC SMALL LETTER SEMISOFT SIGN
- U+048E Ҏ CYRILLIC CAPITAL LETTER ER WITH TICK
- U+048F ҏ CYRILLIC SMALL LETTER ER WITH TICK
- U+0490 Ґ CYRILLIC CAPITAL LETTER GHE WITH UPTURN
- U+0491 ґ CYRILLIC SMALL LETTER GHE WITH UPTURN
- U+0492 Ғ CYRILLIC CAPITAL LETTER GHE WITH STROKE
- U+0493 ғ CYRILLIC SMALL LETTER GHE WITH STROKE
- U+0494 Ҕ CYRILLIC CAPITAL LETTER GHE WITH MIDDLE HOOK
- U+0495 ҕ CYRILLIC SMALL LETTER GHE WITH MIDDLE HOOK
- U+0496 Җ CYRILLIC CAPITAL LETTER ZHE WITH DESCENDER
- U+0497 җ CYRILLIC SMALL LETTER ZHE WITH DESCENDER
- U+0498 Ҙ CYRILLIC CAPITAL LETTER ZE WITH DESCENDER
- U+0499 ҙ CYRILLIC SMALL LETTER ZE WITH DESCENDER
- U+049A Қ CYRILLIC CAPITAL LETTER KA WITH DESCENDER
- U+049B қ CYRILLIC SMALL LETTER KA WITH DESCENDER
- U+049C Ҝ CYRILLIC CAPITAL LETTER KA WITH VERTICAL STROKE
- U+049D ҝ CYRILLIC SMALL LETTER KA WITH VERTICAL STROKE
- U+049E Ҟ CYRILLIC CAPITAL LETTER KA WITH STROKE
- U+049F ҟ CYRILLIC SMALL LETTER KA WITH STROKE
- U+04A0 Ҡ CYRILLIC CAPITAL LETTER BASHKIR KA
- U+04A1 ҡ CYRILLIC SMALL LETTER BASHKIR KA
- U+04A2 Ң CYRILLIC CAPITAL LETTER EN WITH DESCENDER
- U+04A3 ң CYRILLIC SMALL LETTER EN WITH DESCENDER
- U+04A4 Ҥ CYRILLIC CAPITAL LIGATURE EN GHE
- U+04A5 ҥ CYRILLIC SMALL LIGATURE EN GHE
- U+04A6 Ҧ CYRILLIC CAPITAL LETTER PE WITH MIDDLE HOOK
- U+04A7 ҧ CYRILLIC SMALL LETTER PE WITH MIDDLE HOOK
- U+04A8 Ҩ CYRILLIC CAPITAL LETTER ABKHASIAN HA
- U+04A9 ҩ CYRILLIC SMALL LETTER ABKHASIAN HA
- U+04AA Ҫ CYRILLIC CAPITAL LETTER ES WITH DESCENDER
- U+04AB ҫ CYRILLIC SMALL LETTER ES WITH DESCENDER
- U+04AC Ҭ CYRILLIC CAPITAL LETTER TE WITH DESCENDER
- U+04AD ҭ CYRILLIC SMALL LETTER TE WITH DESCENDER
- U+04AE Ү CYRILLIC CAPITAL LETTER STRAIGHT U
- U+04AF ү CYRILLIC SMALL LETTER STRAIGHT U
- U+04B0 Ұ CYRILLIC CAPITAL LETTER STRAIGHT U WITH STROKE
- U+04B1 ұ CYRILLIC SMALL LETTER STRAIGHT U WITH STROKE
- U+04B2 Ҳ CYRILLIC CAPITAL LETTER HA WITH DESCENDER
- U+04B3 ҳ CYRILLIC SMALL LETTER HA WITH DESCENDER
- U+04B4 Ҵ CYRILLIC CAPITAL LIGATURE TE TSE
- U+04B5 ҵ CYRILLIC SMALL LIGATURE TE TSE
- U+04B6 Ҷ CYRILLIC CAPITAL LETTER CHE WITH DESCENDER
- U+04B7 ҷ CYRILLIC SMALL LETTER CHE WITH DESCENDER
- U+04B8 Ҹ CYRILLIC CAPITAL LETTER CHE WITH VERTICAL STROKE
- U+04B9 ҹ CYRILLIC SMALL LETTER CHE WITH VERTICAL STROKE
- U+04BA Һ CYRILLIC CAPITAL LETTER SHHA
- U+04BB һ CYRILLIC SMALL LETTER SHHA
- U+04BC Ҽ CYRILLIC CAPITAL LETTER ABKHASIAN CHE
- U+04BD ҽ CYRILLIC SMALL LETTER ABKHASIAN CHE
- U+04BE Ҿ CYRILLIC CAPITAL LETTER ABKHASIAN CHE WITH DESCENDER
- U+04BF ҿ CYRILLIC SMALL LETTER ABKHASIAN CHE WITH DESCENDER
- U+04C0 Ӏ CYRILLIC LETTER PALOCHKA
- U+04C1 Ӂ CYRILLIC CAPITAL LETTER ZHE WITH BREVE
- U+04C2 ӂ CYRILLIC SMALL LETTER ZHE WITH BREVE
- U+04C3 Ӄ CYRILLIC CAPITAL LETTER KA WITH HOOK
- U+04C4 ӄ CYRILLIC SMALL LETTER KA WITH HOOK
- U+04C5 Ӆ CYRILLIC CAPITAL LETTER EL WITH TAIL
- U+04C6 ӆ CYRILLIC SMALL LETTER EL WITH TAIL
- U+04C7 Ӈ CYRILLIC CAPITAL LETTER EN WITH HOOK
- U+04C8 ӈ CYRILLIC SMALL LETTER EN WITH HOOK
- U+04C9 Ӊ CYRILLIC CAPITAL LETTER EN WITH TAIL
- U+04CA ӊ CYRILLIC SMALL LETTER EN WITH TAIL
- U+04CB Ӌ CYRILLIC CAPITAL LETTER KHAKASSIAN CHE
- U+04CC ӌ CYRILLIC SMALL LETTER KHAKASSIAN CHE
- U+04CD Ӎ CYRILLIC CAPITAL LETTER EM WITH TAIL
- U+04CE ӎ CYRILLIC SMALL LETTER EM WITH TAIL
- U+04CF ӏ CYRILLIC SMALL LETTER PALOCHKA
- U+04D0 Ӑ CYRILLIC CAPITAL LETTER A WITH BREVE
- U+04D1 ӑ CYRILLIC SMALL LETTER A WITH BREVE
- U+04D2 Ӓ CYRILLIC CAPITAL LETTER A WITH DIAERESIS
- U+04D3 ӓ CYRILLIC SMALL LETTER A WITH DIAERESIS
- U+04D4 Ӕ CYRILLIC CAPITAL LIGATURE A IE
- U+04D5 ӕ CYRILLIC SMALL LIGATURE A IE
- U+04D6 Ӗ CYRILLIC CAPITAL LETTER IE WITH BREVE
- U+04D7 ӗ CYRILLIC SMALL LETTER IE WITH BREVE
- U+04D8 Ә CYRILLIC CAPITAL LETTER SCHWA
- U+04D9 ә CYRILLIC SMALL LETTER SCHWA
- U+04DA Ӛ CYRILLIC CAPITAL LETTER SCHWA WITH DIAERESIS
- U+04DB ӛ CYRILLIC SMALL LETTER SCHWA WITH DIAERESIS
- U+04DC Ӝ CYRILLIC CAPITAL LETTER ZHE WITH DIAERESIS
- U+04DD ӝ CYRILLIC SMALL LETTER ZHE WITH DIAERESIS
- U+04DE Ӟ CYRILLIC CAPITAL LETTER ZE WITH DIAERESIS
- U+04DF ӟ CYRILLIC SMALL LETTER ZE WITH DIAERESIS
- U+04E0 Ӡ CYRILLIC CAPITAL LETTER ABKHASIAN DZE
- U+04E1 ӡ CYRILLIC SMALL LETTER ABKHASIAN DZE
- U+04E2 Ӣ CYRILLIC CAPITAL LETTER I WITH MACRON
- U+04E3 ӣ CYRILLIC SMALL LETTER I WITH MACRON
- U+04E4 Ӥ CYRILLIC CAPITAL LETTER I WITH DIAERESIS
- U+04E5 ӥ CYRILLIC SMALL LETTER I WITH DIAERESIS
- U+04E6 Ӧ CYRILLIC CAPITAL LETTER O WITH DIAERESIS
- U+04E7 ӧ CYRILLIC SMALL LETTER O WITH DIAERESIS
- U+04E8 Ө CYRILLIC CAPITAL LETTER BARRED O
- U+04E9 ө CYRILLIC SMALL LETTER BARRED O
- U+04EA Ӫ CYRILLIC CAPITAL LETTER BARRED O WITH DIAERESIS
- U+04EB ӫ CYRILLIC SMALL LETTER BARRED O WITH DIAERESIS
- U+04EC Ӭ CYRILLIC CAPITAL LETTER E WITH DIAERESIS
- U+04ED ӭ CYRILLIC SMALL LETTER E WITH DIAERESIS
- U+04EE Ӯ CYRILLIC CAPITAL LETTER U WITH MACRON
- U+04EF ӯ CYRILLIC SMALL LETTER U WITH MACRON
- U+04F0 Ӱ CYRILLIC CAPITAL LETTER U WITH DIAERESIS
- U+04F1 ӱ CYRILLIC SMALL LETTER U WITH DIAERESIS
- U+04F2 Ӳ CYRILLIC CAPITAL LETTER U WITH DOUBLE ACUTE
- U+04F3 ӳ CYRILLIC SMALL LETTER U WITH DOUBLE ACUTE
- U+04F4 Ӵ CYRILLIC CAPITAL LETTER CHE WITH DIAERESIS
- U+04F5 ӵ CYRILLIC SMALL LETTER CHE WITH DIAERESIS
- U+04F6 Ӷ CYRILLIC CAPITAL LETTER GHE WITH DESCENDER
- U+04F7 ӷ CYRILLIC SMALL LETTER GHE WITH DESCENDER
- U+04F8 Ӹ CYRILLIC CAPITAL LETTER YERU WITH DIAERESIS
- U+04F9 ӹ CYRILLIC SMALL LETTER YERU WITH DIAERESIS
- U+04FA Ӻ CYRILLIC CAPITAL LETTER GHE WITH STROKE AND HOOK
- U+04FB ӻ CYRILLIC SMALL LETTER GHE WITH STROKE AND HOOK
- U+04FC Ӽ CYRILLIC CAPITAL LETTER HA WITH HOOK
- U+04FD ӽ CYRILLIC SMALL LETTER HA WITH HOOK
- U+04FE Ӿ CYRILLIC CAPITAL LETTER HA WITH STROKE
- U+04FF ӿ CYRILLIC SMALL LETTER HA WITH STROKE

== History ==
The following Unicode-related documents record the purpose and process of defining specific characters in the Cyrillic block:

Version	Final code points (Note: Proposed code points and characters names may differ from final code points and names)	Count	UTC ID	L2 ID	WG2 ID	Document
1.0.0	U+0401..040C, 040E..044F, 0451..045C, 045E..0486, 0490..04C4, 04C7..04C8, 04CB..04CC	188				(to be determined)
1.0.0	U+0401..040C, 040E..044F, 0451..045C, 045E..0486, 0490..04C4, 04C7..04C8, 04CB..04CC	188		L2/00-164		Hudson, John (2000-05-01), Rendering Serbian italic forms with OpenType
1.0.0	U+0401..040C, 040E..044F, 0451..045C, 045E..0486, 0490..04C4, 04C7..04C8, 04CB..04CC	188		L2/00-176		Everson, Michael (2000-06-01), Some Türkmen alphabets
1.0.0	U+0401..040C, 040E..044F, 0451..045C, 045E..0486, 0490..04C4, 04C7..04C8, 04CB..04CC	188		L2/00-219		Everson, Michael (2000-07-09), The case of the Cyrillic letter PALOCHKA
1.0.0	U+0401..040C, 040E..044F, 0451..045C, 045E..0486, 0490..04C4, 04C7..04C8, 04CB..04CC	188		L2/05-287		Kryukov, Alexey (2005-10-02), U+047C/U+047D CYRILLIC OMEGA WITH TITLO
1.0.0	U+0401..040C, 040E..044F, 0451..045C, 045E..0486, 0490..04C4, 04C7..04C8, 04CB..04CC	188		L2/05-279		Moore, Lisa (2005-11-10), "CYRILLIC OMEGA WITH TITLO", UTC #105 Minutes
1.0.0	U+0401..040C, 040E..044F, 0451..045C, 045E..0486, 0490..04C4, 04C7..04C8, 04CB..04CC	188		L2/06-011		Cleminson, Ralph (2006-01-10), Cyrillic Omega with Titlo
1.0.0	U+0401..040C, 040E..044F, 0451..045C, 045E..0486, 0490..04C4, 04C7..04C8, 04CB..04CC	188		L2/06-033		McGowan, Rick (2006-01-30), PRI #83: Changing Glyph for U+047C/U+047D Cyrillic Omega with Titlo
1.0.0	U+0401..040C, 040E..044F, 0451..045C, 045E..0486, 0490..04C4, 04C7..04C8, 04CB..04CC	188		L2/06-192	N3118	Anderson, Deborah (2006-05-08), Request to Change Glyphs for U+0485 and U+0486
1.0.0	U+0401..040C, 040E..044F, 0451..045C, 045E..0486, 0490..04C4, 04C7..04C8, 04CB..04CC	188		L2/06-108		Moore, Lisa (2006-05-25), "Consensus 107-C39", UTC #107 Minutes, "Change the glyphs for U+0485 COMBINING CYRILLIC DASIA PNEUMATA and U+0486 COMBINING CYRILLIC PSILI PNEUMATA"
1.0.0	U+0401..040C, 040E..044F, 0451..045C, 045E..0486, 0490..04C4, 04C7..04C8, 04CB..04CC	188		L2/06-292		Anderson, Deborah (2006-08-07), Re: Public Review Issue #83: Glyph change for Cyrillic Omega with Titlo
1.0.0	U+0401..040C, 040E..044F, 0451..045C, 045E..0486, 0490..04C4, 04C7..04C8, 04CB..04CC	188		L2/06-231		Moore, Lisa (2006-08-17), "B.11.2", UTC #108 Minutes
1.0.0	U+0401..040C, 040E..044F, 0451..045C, 045E..0486, 0490..04C4, 04C7..04C8, 04CB..04CC	188			N3153 (pdf, doc)	Umamaheswaran, V. S. (2007-02-16), "M49.1f", Unconfirmed minutes of WG 2 meeting 49 AIST, Akihabara, Tokyo, Japan; 2006-09-25/29, "Correct the glyphs for 0485 COMBINING CYRILLIC DASIA PNEUMATA and 0486 COMBINING CYRILLIC PSILI PNEUMATA based on document N3118."
1.0.0	U+0401..040C, 040E..044F, 0451..045C, 045E..0486, 0490..04C4, 04C7..04C8, 04CB..04CC	188		L2/06-329		Cleminson, Ralph (2006-10-11), Histoire d'O (omega with titlo)
1.0.0	U+0401..040C, 040E..044F, 0451..045C, 045E..0486, 0490..04C4, 04C7..04C8, 04CB..04CC	188		L2/06-357	N3184	Everson, Michael; Birnbaum, David; Cleminson, Ralph; Derzhanski, Ivan; Dorosh, Vladislav; Kryukov, Alexey; Paliga, Sorin (2006-10-30), On CYRILLIC LETTER OMEGA WITH TITLO and on CYRILLIC LETTER UK
1.0.0	U+0401..040C, 040E..044F, 0451..045C, 045E..0486, 0490..04C4, 04C7..04C8, 04CB..04CC	188		L2/06-389		Birnbaum, David (2006-11-13), Diacritics for Early Cyrillic
1.0.0	U+0401..040C, 040E..044F, 0451..045C, 045E..0486, 0490..04C4, 04C7..04C8, 04CB..04CC	188		L2/06-324R2		Moore, Lisa (2006-11-29), "C.11.2", UTC #109 Minutes
1.0.0	U+0401..040C, 040E..044F, 0451..045C, 045E..0486, 0490..04C4, 04C7..04C8, 04CB..04CC	188		L2/07-268	N3253 (pdf, doc)	Umamaheswaran, V. S. (2007-07-26), "M50.8 (Cyrillic glyph corrections)", Unconfirmed minutes of WG 2 meeting 50, Frankfurt-am-Main, Germany; 2007-04-24/27
1.0.0	U+0401..040C, 040E..044F, 0451..045C, 045E..0486, 0490..04C4, 04C7..04C8, 04CB..04CC	188		L2/08-144	N3435R	Everson, Michael; Priest, Lorna (2008-04-11), Proposal to encode two Cyrillic characters for Abkhaz
1.0.0	U+0401..040C, 040E..044F, 0451..045C, 045E..0486, 0490..04C4, 04C7..04C8, 04CB..04CC	188		L2/08-318	N3453 (pdf, doc)	Umamaheswaran, V. S. (2008-08-13), "M52.1", Unconfirmed minutes of WG 2 meeting 52, "Change the glyphs for 04A8, 04A9, 04BE and 04BF (Abkhasian letters) to those shown in document N3435 to reflect modern Abkhaz orthography preference."
1.0.0	U+0401..040C, 040E..044F, 0451..045C, 045E..0486, 0490..04C4, 04C7..04C8, 04CB..04CC	188		L2/08-161R2		Moore, Lisa (2008-11-05), "Action item 115-A76", UTC #115 Minutes, "Create a glyph erratum for the 4 changed Abkhaz glyphs..."
1.0.0	U+0401..040C, 040E..044F, 0451..045C, 045E..0486, 0490..04C4, 04C7..04C8, 04CB..04CC	188		L2/15-014		Andreev, Aleksandr; Shardt, Yuri; Simmons, Nikita (2015-01-26), Proposal to Change Annotations on Some Cyrillic Characters
1.0.0	U+0401..040C, 040E..044F, 0451..045C, 045E..0486, 0490..04C4, 04C7..04C8, 04CB..04CC	188		L2/15-182		Whistler, Ken (2015-07-20), Suggested Responses to Suggestions re Cyrillic in L2/15-014
1.0.0	U+0401..040C, 040E..044F, 0451..045C, 045E..0486, 0490..04C4, 04C7..04C8, 04CB..04CC	188		L2/15-187		Moore, Lisa (2015-08-11), "Action item 144-A29", UTC #144 Minutes, "Add the Script_Extension value of "Glagolitic" to U+0484 for Unicode 9.0."
1.1	U+04D0..04EB, 04EE..04F5, 04F8..04F9	38				(to be determined)
3.0	U+0400, 040D, 0450, 045D	4			N418	Yugoslav Position for SC2/ DP 10646
3.0	U+0400, 040D, 0450, 045D	4			N1323	Kardalev, Ratislav; Jerman-Blazic, Borka; Everson, Michael (1996-01-16), Proposal and Summary for addition of Cyrillic characters
3.0	U+0400, 040D, 0450, 045D	4			N1407	Kardalev, Ratislav (1996-05-15), Reconsideration of the ISO/IEC JTC1/SC2/WG2 N 1323 document
3.0	U+0400, 040D, 0450, 045D	4			N1353	Umamaheswaran, V. S.; Ksar, Mike (1996-06-25), "8.3.1", Draft minutes of WG2 Copenhagen Meeting # 30
3.0	U+0400, 040D, 0450, 045D	4			N1453	Ksar, Mike; Umamaheswaran, V. S. (1996-12-06), "8.4", WG 2 Minutes - Quebec Meeting 31
3.0	U+0400, 040D, 0450, 045D	4	UTC/1996-xxx			Greenfield, Steve (1996-12-13), "Motion #70-7", Action Items & Resolutions Generated at UTC #70
3.0	U+0400, 040D, 0450, 045D	4		L2/98-004R	N1681	Text of ISO 10646 – AMD 18 for PDAM registration and FPDAM ballot, 1997-12-22
3.0	U+0400, 040D, 0450, 045D	4		L2/98-318	N1894	Revised text of 10646-1/FPDAM 18, AMENDMENT 18: Symbols and Others, 1998-10-22
3.0	U+0488..0489	2		L2/98-211	N1744	Everson, Michael (1998-05-25), Additional Cyrillic characters for the UCS
3.0	U+0488..0489	2		L2/98-301	N1847	Everson, Michael (1998-09-12), Responses to NCITS/L2 and Unicode Consortium comments on numerous proposals
3.0	U+0488..0489	2		L2/98-372	N1884R2 (pdf, doc)	Whistler, Ken; et al. (1998-09-22), Additional Characters for the UCS
3.0	U+0488..0489	2		L2/98-329	N1920	Combined PDAM registration and consideration ballot on WD for ISO/IEC 10646-1/Amd. 30, AMENDMENT 30: Additional Latin and other characters, 1998-10-28
3.0	U+0488..0489	2		L2/99-010	N1903 (pdf, html, doc)	Umamaheswaran, V. S. (1998-12-30), "8.1.5.1", Minutes of WG 2 meeting 35, London, U.K.; 1998-09-21--25
3.0	U+0488..0489	2		L2/01-050	N2253	Umamaheswaran, V. S. (2001-01-21), "7.15 Komi Cyrillic", Minutes of the SC2/WG2 meeting in Athens, September 2000
3.0	U+048C..048D	2		L2/99-077.1	N1975	Irish Comments on SC 2 N 3210, 1999-01-20
3.0	U+048C..048D	2		L2/99-232	N2003	Umamaheswaran, V. S. (1999-08-03), "6.1.4", Minutes of WG 2 meeting 36, Fukuoka, Japan, 1999-03-09--15
3.0	U+048E..048F, 04EC..04ED	4		L2/97-146	N1590	Trosterud, Trond (1997-06-09), Proposal to add 10 Cyrillic Sámi characters to ISO/IEC 10646
3.0	U+048E..048F, 04EC..04ED	4		L2/97-288	N1603	Umamaheswaran, V. S. (1997-10-24), "8.24.7", Unconfirmed Meeting Minutes, WG 2 Meeting # 33, Heraklion, Crete, Greece, 20 June – 4 July 1997
3.0	U+048E..048F, 04EC..04ED	4		L2/98-211	N1744	Everson, Michael (1998-05-25), Additional Cyrillic characters for the UCS
3.0	U+048E..048F, 04EC..04ED	4		L2/98-281R (pdf, html)		Aliprand, Joan (1998-07-31), "Cyrillic characters (IV.C.4)", Unconfirmed Minutes – UTC #77 & NCITS Subgroup L2 # 174 JOINT MEETING, Redmond, WA -- July 29-31, 1998
3.0	U+048E..048F, 04EC..04ED	4		L2/98-292R (pdf, html, Figure 1)		"2.3", Comments on proposals to add characters from ISO standards developed by ISO/TC 46/SC 4, 1998-08-19
3.0	U+048E..048F, 04EC..04ED	4		L2/98-292	N1840	"2.3", Comments on proposals to add characters from ISO standards developed by ISO/TC 46/SC 4, 1998-08-25
3.0	U+048E..048F, 04EC..04ED	4		L2/98-301	N1847	Everson, Michael (1998-09-12), Responses to NCITS/L2 and Unicode Consortium comments on numerous proposals
3.0	U+048E..048F, 04EC..04ED	4		L2/98-372	N1884R2 (pdf, doc)	Whistler, Ken; et al. (1998-09-22), Additional Characters for the UCS
3.0	U+048E..048F, 04EC..04ED	4		L2/98-329	N1920	Combined PDAM registration and consideration ballot on WD for ISO/IEC 10646-1/Amd. 30, AMENDMENT 30: Additional Latin and other characters, 1998-10-28
3.0	U+048E..048F, 04EC..04ED	4		L2/99-010	N1903 (pdf, html, doc)	Umamaheswaran, V. S. (1998-12-30), "8.1.5.1", Minutes of WG 2 meeting 35, London, U.K.; 1998-09-21--25
3.0	U+048E..048F, 04EC..04ED	4		L2/01-050	N2253	Umamaheswaran, V. S. (2001-01-21), "7.15 Komi Cyrillic", Minutes of the SC2/WG2 meeting in Athens, September 2000
3.2	U+048A..048B, 04C5..04C6, 04C9..04CA, 04CD..04CE	8		L2/98-258	N1813	Trosterud, Trond (1997-06-09), Proposal to add 10 Cyrillic Sámi characters to ISO/IEC 10646
3.2	U+048A..048B, 04C5..04C6, 04C9..04CA, 04CD..04CE	8		L2/98-276	N1813 p6	Kuruch, Rimma; et al. (1998-07-20), Norwegian comments on Cyrillic Sámi
3.2	U+048A..048B, 04C5..04C6, 04C9..04CA, 04CD..04CE	8		L2/98-329	N1920	Combined PDAM registration and consideration ballot on WD for ISO/IEC 10646-1/Amd. 30, AMENDMENT 30: Additional Latin and other characters, 1998-10-28
3.2	U+048A..048B, 04C5..04C6, 04C9..04CA, 04CD..04CE	8		L2/99-010	N1903 (pdf, html, doc)	Umamaheswaran, V. S. (1998-12-30), "8.2.4", Minutes of WG 2 meeting 35, London, U.K.; 1998-09-21--25
3.2	U+048A..048B, 04C5..04C6, 04C9..04CA, 04CD..04CE	8		L2/99-255	N2069	Summary of Voting on SC 2 N 3309, ISO 10646-1/FPDAM 30 - Additional Latin and other characters, 1999-08-19
3.2	U+048A..048B, 04C5..04C6, 04C9..04CA, 04CD..04CE	8		L2/00-082	N2173	Everson, Michael; et al. (2000-03-03), Proposal to add 8 Cyrillic Sámi characters to ISO/IEC 10646
3.2	U+048A..048B, 04C5..04C6, 04C9..04CA, 04CD..04CE	8		L2/00-234	N2203 (rtf, txt)	Umamaheswaran, V. S. (2000-07-21), "8.4", Minutes from the SC2/WG2 meeting in Beijing, 2000-03-21 -- 24
3.2	U+048A..048B, 04C5..04C6, 04C9..04CA, 04CD..04CE	8		L2/00-115R2		Moore, Lisa (2000-08-08), "Motion 83-M2", Minutes Of UTC Meeting #83
4.1	U+04F6..04F7	2		L2/02-452	N2560	Brase, Jim; Constable, Peter (2002-12-06), Proposal for Encoding Additional Cyrillic Characters for Siberian Yupik
5.0	U+04CF	1		L2/05-076		Davis, Mark (2005-02-10), Stability of Case Folding
5.0	U+04CF	1			N2942	Freytag, Asmus; Whistler, Ken (2005-08-12), Proposal to add nine lowercase characters
5.0	U+04CF	1		L2/05-108R		Moore, Lisa (2005-08-26), "Stability of Case Folding (B.14.2)", UTC #103 Minutes
5.0	U+04CF	1			N2953 (pdf, doc)	Umamaheswaran, V. S. (2006-02-16), "M47.5f", Unconfirmed minutes of WG 2 meeting 47, Sophia Antipolis, France; 2005-09-12/15
5.0	U+04FA..04FF	6		L2/05-080R2	N2933	Priest, Lorna (2005-08-02), Proposal to Encode Additional Cyrillic Characters (rev 2005/08/18)
5.0	U+04FA..04FF	6		L2/05-215		Anderson, Deborah (2005-08-03), Feedback on Cyrillic letters EL WITH HOOK and HA WITH HOOK (L2/05-080)
5.0	U+04FA..04FF	6		L2/05-230		Priest, Lorna (2005-08-11), Nameslist annotations for new Cyrillic letters
5.0	U+04FA..04FF	6		L2/05-180		Moore, Lisa (2005-08-17), "Cyrillic (C.18)", UTC #104 Minutes
5.0	U+04FA..04FF	6			N2953 (pdf, doc)	Umamaheswaran, V. S. (2006-02-16), "7.2.4", Unconfirmed minutes of WG 2 meeting 47, Sophia Antipolis, France; 2005-09-12/15
5.1	U+0487	1		L2/06-042		Cleminson, Ralph (2006-01-26), Proposal for additional Cyrillic characters
5.1	U+0487	1		L2/06-181		Anderson, Deborah (2006-05-08), Responses to the UTC regarding L2/06-042, Proposal for Additional Cyrillic Characters
5.1	U+0487	1		L2/06-359		Cleminson, Ralph (2006-10-31), Proposal for additional Cyrillic characters
5.1	U+0487	1		L2/07-003	N3194	Everson, Michael; Birnbaum, David; Cleminson, Ralph; Derzhanski, Ivan; Dorosh, Vladislav; Kryukov, Alexey; Paliga, Sorin; Ruppel, Klaas (2007-01-12), Proposal to encode additional Cyrillic characters in the BMP of the UCS
5.1	U+0487	1		L2/07-055		Cleminson, Ralph (2007-01-19), Comments on Additional Cyrillic Characters (L2/07-003 = WG2 N3194)
5.1	U+0487	1		L2/07-015		Moore, Lisa (2007-02-08), "Cyrillic (C.13)", UTC #110 Minutes
5.1	U+0487	1		L2/07-268	N3253 (pdf, doc)	Umamaheswaran, V. S. (2007-07-26), "M50.11", Unconfirmed minutes of WG 2 meeting 50, Frankfurt-am-Main, Germany; 2007-04-24/27
