= Even alphabets =

Alphabets used to write the Even language

Even alphabets are the alphabets used to write the Even language. During its existence, it functioned on different graphic bases and was repeatedly reformed. At present, Even writing functions in Cyrillic. There are three stages in the history of Even writing:

- until the early 1930s, early attempts to create a written language based on the Cyrillic alphabet;
- 1931-1937 - writing on the Latin basis;
- since 1937 - modern writing based on the Cyrillic alphabet.

== Early alphabets ==
The first attempts at writings in the Even language were published by Nicolaas Witsen in 1692. In the 18th century, separate Even words were published by Jacob Johann Lindenau (ru), and also in the comparative dictionary P. S. Pallas (ru), published in 1787–1789.

In the 1840s, on behalf of the Archbishop of Kamchatka and Aleutian Innokentiy (Veniaminov), church texts began to be translated into the Even language. The work was led by Okhotsk archpriest Stefan Popov and the Stanitsky foreman Sheludyakov from the Tauisk (ru) second outpost, who was directly involved in the translation. This determined the choice of the dialect for translation: the Oleskii dialect. Translation work was carried out in the years 1851–1854.

The translators' first publication was the 1858 Тунгусского букваря on the Church Slavonic chart. The alphabet of this primer included the following letters: А а, Б б, В в, Г̱ г̱, Ҥ̱ ҥ̱, Д д, Е е, И и, Ж ж, К к, Л л, М м, Н н, О о, П п, Р р, Т т, У у, Х х, Ч ч, Ш ш, С с, Ъ ъ, Ы ы, Ь ь, Ѣ ѣ, Э э, Ю ю, Ꙗ ѧ. Following this alphabet came a published dictionary (1859, reprinted in 1900) and the Gospel of Matthew (1880).

In 1926, the Russian-Lamut and Russian-Koryak Dictionary was published in Petropavlovsk-Kamchatsky which used the Russian alphabet. The Russian alphabet was used as the basis for Even writing in a handwritten primer written in 1930 by teacher N. P. Tkachik at the Arkinskaya school.

== Latin ==
External image
- The first issue of the newspaper "Ajӡid orocәl" in the Even Latin script, 1931

In the 1920s, the Latinized writing process began in USSR. In April 1930, at the VII Plenum of the Committee of the North, it was decided to create alphabets for the peoples of the North. In May 1931 Narkompros of the RSFSR was approved "Unified Northern Alphabet", including its version for Even language. The approved alphabet had the following form: A a, Ā ā, B в, Є є, D d, Ӡ ӡ, E e, Ә ә, Ә̄ ә̄, G g, H h, I i, J j, K k, L l, M m, N n, Ņ ņ, Ŋ ŋ, O o, ō, P p, R r, S s, T t, U u, W w .

In 1932, the alphabet book Anŋamta torә̄n was published on this alphabet. Other educational, children's, as well as political literature and certain materials in newspapers began to appear.

In 1933–1934, the alphabet was somewhat modified and eventually began to look like this:

A a	B в	C c	D d	Ӡ ӡ	E e	Ә ә	Ә̄ ә̄	F f
G g	H h	I i	J j	K k	L l	M m	N n	Ņ ņ
Ŋ ŋ	O o	P p	R r	S s	T t	U u	W w	Z z

This alphabet was officially abolished at the end of 1936 but continued to be used in print until 1939.

== Cyrillic ==
In 1936–1937, the Even Latin alphabet, like other alphabets of the peoples of the USSR, was replaced by a Cyrillic alphabet that contained all Russian letters and the digraph Нг нг. However, the Even-language newspaper "Оротта правда", published in the late 1930s in Magadan, used the additional letter ә. In the official version of the Even script in 1947, the digraph нг was officially canceled, but in 1954 it was restored again.

In 1953 the digraph Нг нг was replaced by the letter Ӈ ӈ, besides the letters Ө ө and Ӫ ӫ were added. However, in educational literature (which was published mainly in Leningrad) these letters began to be used only from the beginning of the 1960s, and for a long time they did not find use in literature published in the Even settlement areas.

The vast territory of Even settlement, the differences in dialects, the presence of various letters in typographic fonts caused the fact that different versions of Even script began to spontaneously arise in different regions. Only educational literature for elementary schools, published in Leningrad or Moscow, remained unified.

Thus, in Yakut ASSR since the beginning of the 1960s, a local form of recording the Even language has been developed, graphically approximated to Yakut Script. In 1982, this form was legalized by the decision of local authorities, but already canceled in 1987, while continuing to be used unofficially for example, in the newspaper Ilken (sah). The difference between this form was the use of the letter Ҥ ҥ instead of the standard Ӈ ӈ , use of additional characters Ҕ ҕ, Һ һ, Ү ү, Ө ө, Дь дь, Нь нь (Ү ү was not officially entered into the alphabet, but was used in practice), and also the display long vowels by doubling them.

In Magadan Oblast and in Chukotka, the main difference between the local version of the Even script and the standard version was the use of the letter Н' н' instead of Ӈ ӈ , as well as О о, У у instead of Ө ө and Ё ё instead of Ӫ ӫ. Since 1983, the Magadan Region, and since 1993, Chukotka switched to the official alphabet. At the same time, in Chukotka, in the local press, specific letters of the Even written language were not introduced at the same time — first, the Ӈ ӈ , then Ө ө , and finally ӫ. In a number of Chukchi Even editions the use of the Ӄ ӄ letter is noted.

In Kamchatka Oblast, the Even language has been used in the local press since the late 1980s. In the local version of the Even alphabet, the alphabet adopted in the 1940s was used. At the beginning of the XXI century, the Even media of Kamchatka (the newspaper "Аборигены Камчатки") switched to the official version of the Even alphabet.

Thus, outside of school education, which was always and everywhere conducted in the literary Even language, there were 4 regional variants of Even writing and spelling:

1. Literary language based on Eastern dialect (Magadan region, Chukotka)
2. Kamchatka writing form
3. Indigirskaya writing form (Yakutia)
4. Sakkyryr writing form (Yakutia)

The last two forms have no differences in the alphabet, but differ in terms of spelling.

Modern Even alphabet

А а	Б б	В в	Г г	Д д	Е е	Ё ё	Ж ж	З з
И и	Й й	К к	Л л	М м	Н н	Ӈ ӈ	О о	Ө ө
Ӫ ӫ	П п	Р р	С с	Т т	У у	Ф ф	Х х	Ц ц
Ч ч	Ш ш	Щ щ	Ъ ъ	Ы ы	Ь ь	Э э	Ю ю	Я я
