= I with diaeresis =

I with diaeresis may refer to:

- I with diaeresis (Latin) (Ï, ï) - a Latin letter used in French, Catalan and several other languages
- Yi (Cyrillic) (Ї, ї) - a Cyrillic letter used in the Ukrainian and Rusyn languages
- I with diaeresis (Cyrillic) (Ӥ, ӥ) - a Cyrillic letter used in the Udmurt language
