= I with macron =

I with macron may refer to:

- I with macron (Cyrillic) (Ӣ, ӣ)
- I with macron (Latin) (Ī, ī)
