= Cyrillic digraphs =

Overview of digraphs in the Cyrillic script

The Cyrillic script family contains many specially treated two-letter combinations, or digraphs, but few of these are used in Slavic languages. In a few alphabets, trigraphs and even the occasional tetragraph or pentagraph are used.

In early Cyrillic, the digraphs ⟨оу⟩ and ⟨оѵ⟩ were used for /u/. As with the equivalent digraph in Greek, they were reduced to a typographic ligature, ⟨ꙋ⟩, and are now written ⟨у⟩. The modern letters ⟨ы⟩ and ⟨ю⟩ started out as digraphs, ⟨ъі⟩ and ⟨іо⟩. In Church Slavonic printing practice, both historical and modern, ⟨оу⟩ (which is considered as a letter from the alphabet's point of view) is mostly treated as two individual characters, but ⟨ы⟩ is a single letter. For example, letter-spacing affects ⟨оу⟩ as if they were two individual letters, and never affects components of ⟨ы⟩. In a context of Old Slavonic language, ⟨шт⟩ is a digraph that can replace a letter ⟨щ⟩ and vice versa.

Modern Slavic languages written in the Cyrillic alphabet make little or no use of digraphs. There are only two true digraphs: ⟨дж⟩ for /d͡ʒ/ and ⟨дз⟩ for /d͡z/ (Belarusian, Bulgarian, Ukrainian). Sometimes these digraphs are even considered as special letters of their respective alphabets. In standard Russian, however, the letters in ⟨дж⟩ and ⟨дз⟩ are always pronounced separately. Digraph-like letter pairs include combinations of consonants with the soft sign ⟨ь⟩ (Serbian/Macedonian letters ⟨љ⟩ and ⟨њ⟩ are derived from ⟨ль⟩ and ⟨нь⟩), and ⟨жж⟩ or ⟨зж⟩ for the uncommon and optional Russian phoneme /ʑː/.and also ⟨вв⟩ for /v/. Native descriptions of Cyrillic writing system often use the term "digraph" to combinations ⟨ьо⟩ and ⟨йо⟩ (Bulgarian, Ukrainian) as they both correspond to a single letter ⟨ё⟩ of Russian and Belarusian alphabets (⟨ьо⟩ is used for /ʲo/, and ⟨йо⟩ for /jo/).

Cyrillic uses large numbers of digraphs only when used to write non-Slavic languages; in some languages such as Avar, these are completely regular in formation.

Many Caucasian languages use ⟨ә⟩ (Abkhaz), ⟨у⟩ (Kabardian & Adyghe), or ⟨в⟩ (Avar) for labialization, just as many of them, like Russian, use ⟨ь⟩ for palatalization. Since such sequences are decomposable, regular forms will not be listed below. (In Abkhaz, ⟨ә⟩ with sibilants is equivalent to ⟨ьә⟩, for instance ж /ʐ/, жь /ʒ/~/ʐʲ/, жә /ʒʷ/~/ʐʲʷ/, but this is predictable phonetic detail.) Similarly, long vowels written double in some languages, such as ⟨аа⟩ for Abkhaz /aː/ or ⟨аюу⟩ for Kirghiz /ajuː/ "bear", or with glottal stop, as Tajik аъ [aʔ~aː], are not included.

== Archi ==
Archi: а́а [áː], аӀ [aˤ], а́Ӏ [áˤ], ааӀ [aːˤ], гв [ɡʷ], гь [h], гъ [ʁ], гъв [ʁʷ], гъӀ [ʁˤ], гъӀв [ʁʷˤ], гӀ [ʕ], е́е [éː], еӀ [eˤ], е́Ӏ [éˤ], жв [ʒʷ], зв [zʷ], и́и [íː], иӀ [iˤ], кк [kː], кв [kʷ], ккв [kːʷ], кӀ [kʼ], кӀв [kʷʼ], къ [qʼ], къв [q’ʷ], ккъ [qː’], къӀ [qˤʼ], ккъӀ [qːˤʼ], къӀв [qʷˤʼ], ккъӀв [qːʷˤʼ], кь [kʟ̥ʼ], кьв [kʟ̥ʷʼ], лъ [ɬ], ллъ [ɬː], лъв [ɬʷ], ллъв [ɬːʷ], лӀ [kʟ̥], лӀв [kʟ̥ʷ], о́о [óː], оӀ [oˤ], о́Ӏ [óˤ], ооӀ [oːˤ], пп [pː], пӀ [pʼ], сс [sː], св [sʷ], тт [tː], тӀ [tʼ], тв [tʷ], твӀ [t’ʷ], у́у [úː], уӀ [uˤ], у́Ӏ [úˤ], хх [χː], хв [χʷ], ххв [χːʷ], хӀ [ħ], хьӀ [χˤ], ххьӀ [χːˤ], хьӀв [χʷˤ], ххьӀв [χːʷˤ], хъ [q], хъв [qʷ], хъӀ [qˤ], хъӀв [qʷˤ], цв [t͡sʷ], цӀ [t͡sʼ], ццӀ [t͡sː], чв [t͡ʃʷ], чӀ [t͡ʃʼ], чӀв [t͡ʃ’ʷ], шв [ʃʷ], щв [ʃːʷ], ээ [əː], эӀ [əˤ]

== Avar ==
Avar uses ⟨в⟩ for labialization, as in хьв /xʷ/. Other digraphs are:

- Ejective consonants in ⟨Ӏ⟩: кӀ /kʼ/, цӀ /tsʼ/, чӀ /tʃʼ/
- Other consonants based on к /k/: къ /qʼː/, кь /tɬʼː/,
- Based on г /ɡ/: гъ /ʁ/, гь /h/, гӀ /ʕ/
- Based on л /l/: лъ /tɬː/
- Based on х /χ/: хъ /qː/, хь /x/, хӀ /ħ/

The ь digraphs are spelled this way even before vowels, as in гьабуна /habuna/ "made", not *гябуна.

- Gemination: кк /kː/, кӀкӀ /kʼː/, хх /χː/, цц /tsː/, цӀцӀ /tsʼː/, чӀчӀ /tʃʼː/.

Note that three of these are tetragraphs. However, gemination for the 'strong' consonants in Avar orthography is sporadic, and the simple letters or digraphs are frequently used in their place.

== Belarusian ==
The Belarusian language has the following digraphs:

- 'дз' for affricates [d͡z] and [d͡zʲ] (see uk:дз)
- 'дж' for affricate [d͡ʒ] (see дж).

== Chechen and Ingush ==
Chechen uses the following digraphs:

- Vowels: аь /æ/, яь /jæ/, оь /ø/, ёь /jø/, уь /y/, юь /jy/
- Ejectives in ⟨Ӏ⟩: кӀ /kʼ/, пӀ /pʼ/, тӀ /tʼ/, цӀ /tsʼ/, чӀ /tʃʼ/
- Other consonants: гӀ /ɣ/, кх /q/, къ /qʼ/, хь /ħ/, хӀ /h/
- The trigraph рхӀ /r̥/

The vowel digraphs are used for front vowels for other Dagestanian languages and also the local Turkic languages Kumyk and Nogay. ⟨Ӏ⟩ digraphs for ejectives is common across the North Caucasus, as is гӀ for /ɣ~ʁ~ʕ/.

== Kabardian and Adyghe ==
Kabardian and Adyghe both use ⟨у⟩ for labialization, as in Ӏу /ʔʷ/. гу is /ɡʷ/, though г is /ɣ/); ку is /kʷ/, despite the fact that к is not used outside loan words. (Note: The rest of this section only focuses on Kabardian.)

Other digraphs are:

- Slavic дж /ɡʲ/, дз /dz/
- Ejectives in ⟨Ӏ⟩: кӀ /kʲʼ/ (but кӀу is /kʷʼ/), лӀ /ɬʼ/, пӀ /pʼ/, тӀ /tʼ/, фӀ /fʼ/, цӀ /tsʼ/, щӀ /ɕʼ/
- Other consonants: гъ /ʁ/, жь /ʑ/, къ /qʼ/, лъ /ɬ/ (from л /ɮ/), хь /ħ/, хъ /χ/
- The trigraph кхъ /q/

Labialized, the trigraph becomes the unusual tetragraph кхъу /qʷ/.

== Tabasaran ==
Tabasaran uses gemination for its 'strong' consonants, but this has a different value with г.

- Front vowels: аь /æ/, уь /y/
- Gemination for 'strong' consonants: кк /kː/, пп /pː/, тт /tː/, цц /tsʰː/, чч /tʃʰː/
- Ejectives with ⟨Ӏ⟩: кӀ /kʼ/, пӀ /pʼ/, тӀ /tʼ/, цӀ /tsʼ/, чӀ /tʃʼ/
- Based on г /ɡ/: гг /ɣ/, гъ /ʕ/, гь /h/
- Other consonants based on к /kʰ/: къ /qʰː/, кь /qʼ/,
- Based on х /ɦ/: хъ /qʰ/, хь /x/

It uses ⟨в⟩ for labialization of its postalveolar consonants: шв /ʃʷ/, жв /ʒʷ/, чв /tʃʰʷ/, джь /dʒʷ/, ь /tʃʼʷ/, ччь /tʃʷʰː/).

== Tatar ==
Tatar has a number of vowels which are written with ambiguous letters that are normally resolved by context, but which are resolved by discontinuous digraphs when context is not sufficient. These ambiguous vowel letters are е, front /je/ or back /jɤ/, ю, front /jy/ or back /ju/; and я, front /jæ/ or back /ja/. They interact with the ambiguous consonant letters к, velar /k/ or uvular /q/, and г, velar /ɡ/ or uvular /ʁ/.

In general, velar consonants occur before front vowels and uvular consonants before back vowels, so it is frequently not necessary to specify these values in the orthography. However, this is not always the case. A uvular followed by a front vowel, as in /qærdæʃ/ "kinsman", for example, is written with the corresponding back vowel to specify the uvular value: кардәш. The front value of а is required by vowel harmony with the following front vowel ә, so this spelling is unambiguous.

If, however, the proper value of the vowel is not recoverable through vowel harmony, then the letter ь /ʔ/ is added at the end of the syllable, as in шагыйрь /ʃaʁir/ "poet". That is, /i/ is written with a ы rather than a и to show that the г is pronounced /ʁ/ rather than /ɡ/, then the ь is added to show that the ы is pronounced as if it were a и, so the discontinuous digraph ы...ь is used here to write the vowel /i/. This strategy is also followed with the ambiguous letters е, ю, and я in final syllables, for instance in юнь /jyn/ cheap. That is, the discontinuous digraphs е...ь, ю...ь, я...ь are used for /j/ plus the front vowels /e, y, æ/.

Exceptional final-syllable velars and uvulars, however, are written with simple digraphs, with ь for velars and ъ for uvulars: пакь /pak/ pure, вәгъдә /wæʁdæ/ promise.

== Ukrainian ==
The Ukrainian language has the following digraphs:

- 'ьо', for [ʲɔ] and [ʲo] (see uk:Ьо)
- 'дз' for affricates [d͡z] and [d͡zʲ] (see uk:дз)
- 'дж' for affricates [d͡ʒ] and [d͡ʒʲ] (see uk:дж).

== Other alphabets ==
Dungan

- ан (ян) /(j)æ̃/, он /(j)aŋ/, эр /əɻ/, etc.

Mandarin Chinese

In the Cyrillization of Mandarin, there are digraphs цз and чж, which correspond to Pinyin z/j and zh. Final n is нь, while н stands for final ng. юй is yu, but ю you, ю- yu-, -уй -ui.

Karachay-Balkar

- гъ /ɣ/, дж /dʒ/~/dz/, къ /q/, нг~нъ /ŋ/. Нг /ŋ/ is also found in Uzbek.

Khanty

- л’ /ɬ/, ч’ /tʃ/

Lezgian

- гъ, гь, къ, кь, кӀ, пӀ, тӀ, уь, хъ, хь, цӀ, чӀ

Ossetian

- Slavic дж /dʒ/, дз /dz/
- Ejectives in ⟨ъ⟩: къ /kʼ/, пъ /pʼ/, тъ /tʼ/, цъ /tsʼ/, чъ /tʃʼ/
- гъ /ʁ/, хъ /q/

Komi

- дж /dʒ/, дз /dzʲ/, тш /tʃ/ (ч is /tsʲ/.)

Turkmen (now using Latin alphabet)

- Long үй /yː/, from ү /y/.

Yakut

- дь /ɟ/, нь /ɲ/

== See also ==
- Languages using Cyrillic
- List of Cyrillic letters
- Bigram
- Diacritic
- Diphthong
- Typographic ligature
