= Ukrainian Ye with diaeresis =

Cyrillic letter used for [jə]~[jɤ] in Khanty

- Є̈ є̈
- Ԑ̈ ԑ̈

Usage
- Writing system: Cyrillic
- Type: Alphabetic
- Language of origin: Khanty
- Sound values: [jə], [jɤ], [jɛ]

History
- Variations: Ԑ̈ ԑ̈

Ukrainian Ye with diaeresis (Є̈ є̈; italics: Є̈ є̈) is a letter of the Cyrillic script, used in the Kazym dialect of Northern Khanty.

== Usage ==
Ukrainian Ye with diaeresis is used in the northern dialect group of the Khanty languages, where it represents the sound [jə]~[jɤ], similar to the ‘ia’ in California. Some fonts represent it as a reversed Ze with diaresis, ⟨Ԑ̈ ԑ̈⟩.

== See also ==
- Cyrillic characters in Unicode
- Ukrainian Ye
