= Yu with breve =

Cyrillic letter

- Ю̆ ю̆

Usage
- Writing system: Cyrillic
- Type: Alphabetic
- Language of origin: Northern Khanty

Yu with breve (Ю̆ ю̆; italics: Ю̆ ю̆) is a letter of the Cyrillic script. Yu with breve is used in the Kazym and Shuryshkar dialects of the Northern Khanty language.

== See also ==
- Cyrillic characters in Unicode
