= Cyrillization of Arabic =

Transcription of Arabic into Cyrillic script

Cyrillization of Arabic is the conversion of text written in Arabic script into Cyrillic script. Because the Arabic script is an abjad (a writing system without vowels), an accurate transliteration into Cyrillic, an alphabet, would still require prior knowledge of the subject language to read. Instead, systems of transcription have normally been used.

== Russian system ==
=== Basic alphabet ===
Letter	name	Scientific Transcription			Practical Transcription		Other
Letter	name	IPA	Cyrillic	DIA	lat.	ru.	Other
ﺍ	alif	/aː/	а̄↓	ā↓	a, aa↓	а,↓ я	ә
ﺀ	hamza	/ʔ/	’, —↓	ʾ↓	ʼ, —↓	—↓	ъ, Ӏ
ﺏ	bā’	/b/	б	b	b	б	—
ﺕ	tā’	/t/	т	t	t	т	—
ﺙ	thā’	/θ/	с̱	ṯ	th, s, (t)	с, (т)	ҫ
ﺝ	jīm	/d͡ʒ~ɡ/	дж	ǧ	j, dj, (g)	дж, (г, ж)	җ, ж, ҹ, ӂ, џ
ﺡ	ḥā’ (pharyngeal)	/ħ/	х̣	ḥ	h	х	ҳ, хӀ, хь
ﺥ	khā’	/x~χ/	х̱, х̮	ḫ	kh, x	х	хь
ﺩ	dāl	/d/	д	d	d	д	—
ﺫ	zāl	/ð/	з̱	ḏ	dh, (z, d)	з, (д)	ҙ
ﺭ	rā’	/r/	р	r	r	р	—
ﺯ	zayn	/z/	з	z	z	з	—
ﺱ	sīn	/s/	с	s	s	с	—
ﺵ	shīn	/ʃ/	ш	š	sh, ch	ш	—
ﺹ	ṣād	/sˁ/	с̣	ṣ	s	с	сӀ
ﺽ	ḍād	/dˁ/	д̣	ḍ	d, dh	д	дӀ
ﻁ	ṭā’	/tˁ/	т̣	ṭ	t	т	тӀ, тъ
ﻅ	ẓā’	/ðˁ~zˁ/	з̣	ẓ	z, (zh, dh)	з, (д)	зӀ
ﻉ	‘ayn	/ʕ/	‘	ʿ	ʻ	—, ъ, vowel doubling	Ӏ, гӀ
ﻍ	ghayn	/ɣ/	г, г̣	ġ	g, gh	г	ғ, ҕ, гӀ, гъ
ﻑ	fā’	/f/	ф	f	f	ф	—
ﻕ	qāf	/q/	к̣	q	q, k, (g, gh)	к, (г)	қ, ҡ, ҟ, къ, кх, кь, хъ
ﻙ	kāf	/k/	к	k	k, c	к	—
ﻝ	lām	/l/	л	l	l	л, ль	—
ﻡ	mīm	/m/	м	m	m	м	—
ﻥ	nūn	/n/	н	n	n	н	—
ﻩ	hā’	/h/	х, һ	h	h	х	һ, ҳ, хӀ, гь
ﻭ	wāw	/w, uː/	в, ў, ӯ	w, ū	w, u, oo, ou	в, у, ю	—
ﻱ	yā’	/j, iː/	й, ӣ	y, ī	y, i, ee	й, и, ы	ј

=== Vowels ===
Note: The following tables use the letter hamza (ء) as a carrier to illustrate the use of diacritics. It is not part of these signs.

To record short vowels after a consonant, optional signs (fatḥah, ḍammah, kasrah) are used above this consonant. To write long vowels, the same signs are used plus the corresponding consonant letter.

Letter	Title	Scientific transcription			Practical transcription
Letter	Title	IPA	Cyrillic	DIN	lat.	ru.
Short vowels
ءَ	fatḥah	/a/	а	a	a, e	а, е, э
ءُ	ḍammah	/u/	у	u	u, o, ou	у, о
ءِ	kasrah	/i/	и	i	i, e	и, е, э
Long vowels
ءَا	fatḥah-alif	/aː/	а̄	ā	a, aa	а
ءٰ	alif-khanjariyah	/aː/	а̄	ā	a, aa	а
ءَى	fatḥah-alif-maqsurah	/aː/	а̄	ā	a, aa	а
ءَىٰ	—	/aː/	а̄	ā	a, aa	а
ءُو	ḍammah-waw	/uː/	ӯ	ū	u, oo, ou	у
ءِي	kasrah-ya’	/iː/	ӣ	ī	i, ee	и
Diphthongs
ءَو	fatḥah-waw	/au/	аў	aw	aw, au, aou	ау
ءَي	fatḥah-ya’	/ai/	ай	ay	ay, ey, ei	ай, ей, эй
Combinations
ءُوّ	—	/uːw, -uː/	ӯв	uww	uww	ув
ءِيّ	—	/iːj, -iː/	ӣй	iyy	uyy	ий

=== Hamza ===
The glottal stop (in Arabic hamza ) has complex notation rules. It can be written as a single character on the line ⟨ﺀ⟩, thus not distinguishing itself from other consonants, but much more often it is written above or below three carrier letters: alif, vav, ya. At the same time, hamza, like any consonant, can be both before and after a vowel. At the beginning of words, the hamza is written exclusively above or below the alif. The combination "alif-hamza + fatha + alif" (that is, أَا) is written in a special way through alif-madda. The absence of a hamza is occasionally recorded with a wasla sign (usually used only before the initial alif). In unvoiced texts, even the complete absence of over- or signed hamza is possible (thus hamza is indistinguishable from vav and ya), which further complicates transcription. Hamza is almost never written over the alif of the definite article.

Letter	Name	Phonetic Transcription			Practical Transcription
Letter	Name	IPA	Cyrillic	DIN	lat.	ru.
Hamza before a vowel
أَ	alifa-hamza-fatḥah	/ʔa/	’а	ʾa	’a	а
أُ	alifa-hamza-ḍammah	/ʔu/	’у	ʾu	’u	у
إِ	alif-hamza-kasrah	/ʔi/	’и	ʾi	’i	и
آ	alif-maddah	/ʔaː/	’а̄	ʾā	’a	а
ؤَ	waw-hamza-fatḥah	/ʔa/	’а	ʾa	’a	а
ؤُ	waw-hamza-ḍammah	/ʔu/	’у	ʾu	’u	у
ؤِ	waw-hamza-kasra	/ʔi/	’и	ʾi	’i	и
ئَ	yā’-hamza-fatḥah	/ʔa/	’а	ʾa	’a	а
ئُ	yā’-hamza-ḍammah	/ʔu/	’у	ʾu	’u	у
ئِ	yā’-hamza-kasrah	/ʔi/	’и	ʾi	’i	и
Hamza after a vowel
ءَأ	alifa-hamza-fatḥah	/aʔ/	а’	aʾ	a’	а
ءُأ	alif-hamza-ḍammah	/uʔ/	у’	uʾ	u’	у
ءِأ	alif-hamza-kasrah	/iʔ/	и’	iʾ	i’	и
ءَؤ	waw-hamza-fatḥah	/aʔ/	а’	aʾ	a’	а
ءُؤ	waw-hamza-ḍammah	/uʔ/	у’	uʾ	u’	у
ءِؤ	waw-hamza-kasrah	/iʔ/	и’	iʾ	i’	и
ءَئ	yā’-hamza-fatḥah	/aʔ/	а’	aʾ	a’	а
ءُئ	yā’-hamza-ḍammah	/uʔ/	у’	uʾ	u’	у
ءِئ	yā’-hamza-kasrah	/iʔ/	и’	iʾ	i’	и
Absence of Hamza
ٱ	hamzatu-l-waṣl	/∅/	—

=== Definite Article ===
As with the hamza, there are some difficulties in rendering the Arabic definite article. In neutral position, it is read and transcribed as al- ( el- ). In certain positions, the sound - l - can be assimilated with the subsequent consonant (see more at Sun and moon letters). After vowels, the initial a - ( e -) usually disappears (the so-called wallowing).

Letter	Name	Phonetic Transcription			Practical Transcription
Letter	Name	IPA	Cyrillic	DIN	lat.	ru.
ال	alif-lam	/ʔal-, ʔaCː-/	аль-	al-	al-, el-	аль-, эль-
assimilation al before sun consonants		+	+	+	− / +	− / +

=== Nunation ===
The term ‘’nunation’’ (or ‘’tanwīn’’ ) in Arabic grammar refers to the case endings of the “indefinite state” (corresponds to the indefinite article in other languages). Sometimes, for historical reasons, after the nunation, the silent letters alif-maksura or a simple alif are additionally written.

Letter	Name	Phonetic Transcription			Practical Transcription
Letter	Name	IPA	Cyrillic	DIN	lat.	ru.
ءً	tanwīn-fatḥah	/an/	ан	an		ан
ءًى	—	/an/	ан	an		ан
ءًا	—	/an/	ан	an		ан
ءٌ	tanwīn-ḍammah	/un/	ун	un		ун
ءٍ	tanwīn-kasra	/in/	ин	in		ин

=== Other signs ===
- sukun over a consonant denotes the absence of any vowel after that consonant (including hamza ). Not transcribed at all.
- shaddah over a consonant denotes the doubling of that consonant. Transcribed accordingly by doubling the letters (special case: дждж → ддж ).

Letter	Name	Phonetic Transcription			Practical Transcription
Letter	Name	IPA	Cyrillic	DIN	lat.	ru.
ءْ	sukūn	/∅/	—
ءّ	shaddah	consonant doubling

=== Special Letters and Combinations ===
Letter	Name	Phonetic Transcription			Practical Transcription
Letter	Name	IPA	Cyrillic	DIN	lat.	ru.
ﺓ	tāʾ marbūṭah	/a, at/	а, ат	h, t	a, ah / at	а, ат/ет
ﻯ	alif maqsura	/aː/	а̄	ā	a	а
ﻻ	lam-alif	/laː/	ла̄	lā	la	ля

== Sample Text ==
=== Universal Declaration of Human Rights, Article 1 ===
Arabic text with harakat	Romanization	Russian Cyrillization	Translation
يُولَدُ جَمِيعُ النَّاسِ أحْرَاراً مُتَسَاوِينَ فِي الْكَرَامَةِ وَالحُقُوقِ. وَقَدْ وُهِبُوا عَقْلاً وَ ضَمِيراً وَ عَلَيهِمْ أنْ يُعَامِلَ بَعْضُهُمْ بَعْضاً بِرُوحِ اَلإخَاء.	Yūladu jamī‘u n-nāsi aḥrāran mutasāwīna fī l-karāmati wa-l-ḥuqūq. Wa-qad wuhibū ‘aqlan wa-ḍamīran wa-‘alayhim an yu‘āmila ba‘ḍuhum ba‘ḍan bi-rūḥi l-ikhā’.	Йӯладу джамӣ‘у н-на̄си ах̣ра̄ран мутаса̄вӣна фӣ л-кара̄мати ва-л-х̣ук̣ӯк̣. Ва-к̣ад вухибӯ ‘ак̣лан ва-д̣амӣран ва-‘алайхим ан йу‘а̄мила ба̄‘д̣ухум ба‘д̣ан би-рӯх̣и л-их̱а̄’.	All human beings are born free and equal in dignity and rights. They are endowed with reason and conscience and should act towards one another in a spirit of brotherhood
