= Oe with macron =

Cyrillic letter used in Selkup and Uilta

- Ө̄ ө̄

Usage
- Writing system: Cyrillic
- Type: Alphabetic
- Sound values: [øː], [o~ɵː]

Oe with macron (Ө̄ ө̄; italics: Ө̄ ө̄) is a letter of the Cyrillic script.

Oe with macron is used in Selkup to represent a long close-mid front rounded vowel /øː/ and in Uilta to represent long /o~ɵː/.

Until a new alphabet was published in 2016, it was used in Negidal to represent a long close-mid central rounded vowel /ɵː/.

== Computing codes ==
Oe with macron is not encoded as the precomposed character. It is used as the combining character.

Character information
| Preview | Ө | | ө | | ̄ | |
|---|---|---|---|---|---|---|
| Unicode name | CYRILLIC CAPITAL LETTER BARRED O | | CYRILLIC SMALL LETTER BARRED O | | COMBINING MACRON | |
| Encodings | decimal | hex | dec | hex | dec | hex |
| Unicode | 1256 | U+04E8 | 1257 | U+04E9 | 772 | U+0304 |
| UTF-8 | 211 168 | D3 A8 | 211 169 | D3 A9 | 204 132 | CC 84 |
| Numeric character reference | &#1256; | &#x4E8; | &#1257; | &#x4E9; | &#772; | &#x304; |

== See also ==
- Cyrillic characters in Unicode
