= Ka with vertical stroke =

Cyrillic letter used for /ɟ/ in Azerbaijani Cyrillic

- Ҝ ҝ

Usage
- Writing system: Cyrillic
- Type: Alphabetic
- Language of origin: Azerbaijani
- Sound values: /ɟ/
- In Unicode: U+049C, U+049D

History
- Time period: 1939–present
- Transliterations: G g

Ka with vertical stroke (Ҝ ҝ; italics: Ҝ ҝ) is a letter of the Cyrillic script. Its form is derived from the Cyrillic letter Ka (К к) by the addition of a stroke through the short horizontal bar in the center of the letter.

Ka with vertical stroke was used in the Azerbaijani Cyrillic alphabet from 1939 to 1991 in Azerbaijan, and is still used today in Dagestan and other parts of Russia. It represents the voiced palatal plosive /ɟ/, similar to the pronunciation of ⟨g⟩ in "angular". The corresponding letter in the Latin alphabet is ⟨G g⟩, and the name of the letter is ge (ҝе, [ˈɟɛ]).

The letter is also used in the Tat and Judeo-Tat alphabets in Azerbaijan.

== Computing codes ==
Character information
Preview	Ҝ		ҝ	
Unicode name	CYRILLIC CAPITAL LETTER; KA WITH VERTICAL STROKE		CYRILLIC SMALL LETTER; KA WITH VERTICAL STROKE	
Encodings	decimal	hex	dec	hex
Unicode	1180	U+049C	1181	U+049D
UTF-8	210 156	D2 9C	210 157	D2 9D
Numeric character reference	&#1180;	&#x49C;	&#1181;	&#x49D;

== See also ==
- Cyrillic characters in Unicode
