= Ot (Cyrillic) =

Cyrillic letter

- Ѿ ѿ

Usage
- Writing system: Cyrillic
- Type: Alphabetic
- Sound values: /ɔt̪/
- In Unicode: U+047E, U+047F

History
- Development: Ѡ ѡ: Ѿ ѿ

Other
- Associated numbers: 800 (Cyrillic numerals)

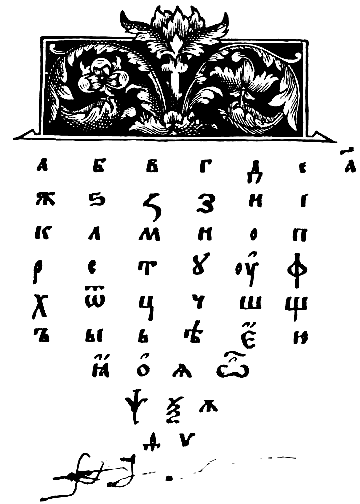
A page from Azbuka, the first Russian textbook, printed by Ivan Fyodorov in 1574. This page features the Cyrillic alphabet.

Ot (Ѿ ѿ; italics: Ѿ ѿ) is a letter of the early Cyrillic alphabet. Though it originated as a ligature of the letters Omega (Ѡ ѡ) and Te (Т т), it functions as a discrete letter of the alphabet, placed between х and ц. This can be seen in the first printed Cyrillic abecedarium (illustrated), and continues in modern usage.

Ot is used in Church Slavonic to represent the preposition отъ 'from' and prefix отъ-. It does not stand for this sequence of letters in any other context, nor can the sequence отъ be substituted for it where it does occur. It is used with a similar purpose in mediaeval manuscripts of other Slavonic languages written with the Cyrillic alphabet. In printed books ѿ is often used in preference to (ѡ҃) for the numeral 800.

== Computing codes ==
Character information
Preview	Ѿ		ѿ	
Unicode name	CYRILLIC CAPITAL LETTER OT		CYRILLIC SMALL LETTER OT	
Encodings	decimal	hex	dec	hex
Unicode	1150	U+047E	1151	U+047F
UTF-8	209 190	D1 BE	209 191	D1 BF
Numeric character reference	&#1150;	&#x47E;	&#1151;	&#x47F;
