= Schwa with diaeresis =

Cyrillic letter used for /ɘ/ in Khanty

Usage
- Writing system: Cyrillic
- Type: Alphabetic
- Sound values: [ɘ]

Schwa with diaeresis (Ӛ ӛ; italics: Ӛ ӛ) is a letter of the Cyrillic script. It is currently unique to the Eastern Khanty (Vakh-Vasyugan dialect). Ӛ is romanized with a Latin schwa and combining marks ⟨Ə̈ ə̈⟩ or ⟨À à⟩ in ISO-9.

== Usage ==
This letter usually represents the close-mid central unrounded vowel /ɘ/.

== Computing codes ==
Character information
Preview	Ӛ		ӛ	
Unicode name	CYRILLIC CAPITAL LETTER; SCHWA WITH DIAERESIS		CYRILLIC SMALL LETTER; SCHWA WITH DIAERESIS	
Encodings	decimal	hex	dec	hex
Unicode	1242	U+04DA	1243	U+04DB
UTF-8	211 154	D3 9A	211 155	D3 9B
Numeric character reference	&#1242;	&#x4DA;	&#1243;	&#x4DB;

== See also ==
- Ә ә : Cyrillic Schwa
- Ə ə : Latin Ə
- Schwa
