= Em with tail =

Cyrillic letter used in Kildin Sámi

- Ӎ ӎ

Usage
- Writing system: Cyrillic
- Type: Alphabetic
- Language of origin: Kildin Sámi
- Sound values: /m̥/

Em with tail (Ӎ ӎ; italics: Ӎ ӎ) is a letter of the extended Cyrillic script. Its form is derived from the Cyrillic letter Em (М м) by adding a tail to the right leg.

Em with tail is used in the current alphabet for the Kildin Sámi language and Ter Sami language in the Kola Peninsula in Russia, where it represents a voiceless bilabial nasal /m̥/. This version of the Kildin Sámi alphabet was developed from 1976 to 1982. Em with tail is one of the distinctive letters of the Kildin Sámi alphabet, and despite its inclusion in Unicode, its cross-linguistic rarity still causes problems, such as not appearing on standard keyboards or in many fonts.

== Computing codes ==
Character information
Preview	Ӎ		ӎ	
Unicode name	CYRILLIC CAPITAL LETTER; EM WITH TAIL		CYRILLIC SMALL LETTER; EM WITH TAIL	
Encodings	decimal	hex	dec	hex
Unicode	1229	U+04CD	1230	U+04CE
UTF-8	211 141	D3 8D	211 142	D3 8E
Numeric character reference	&#1229;	&#x4CD;	&#1230;	&#x4CE;

== See also ==
- Cyrillic characters in Unicode
