= Abkhazian Che with descender =

Cyrillic letter

- Ҿ ҿ

Usage
- Writing system: Cyrillic
- Type: Alphabetic
- Sound values: /ʈ͡ʂʼ/
- In Unicode: U+04BE, U+04BF

Abkhazian Che with descender (E ҿ; italics: Ҿ ҿ) is a letter of the Cyrillic script. Its form is derived from the Cyrillic letter Abkhazian Che (Ҽ ҽ Ҽ ҽ) by the addition of a descender.

Abkhazian Che with descender is used in the alphabet of the Abkhazian language, where it represents the retroflex ejective affricate /ʈ͡ʂʼ/.

== Computing codes ==
Character information
Preview	Ҿ		ҿ	
Unicode name	CYRILLIC CAPITAL LETTER; ABKHASIAN CHE WITH DESCENDER		CYRILLIC SMALL LETTER; ABKHASIAN CHE WITH DESCENDER	
Encodings	decimal	hex	dec	hex
Unicode	1214	U+04BE	1215	U+04BF
UTF-8	210 190	D2 BE	210 191	D2 BF
Numeric character reference	&#1214;	&#x4BE;	&#1215;	&#x4BF;

== See also ==
- Cyrillic characters in Unicode
- Abkhazian Che
