= Short I with tail =

Cyrillic letter used in Kildin Sami

- Ҋ ҋ

Usage
- Writing system: Cyrillic
- Type: Alphabetic
- Language of origin: Kildin Sámi
- Sound values: [j̊]
- In Unicode: U+048A, U+048B

Short I with tail (Ҋ ҋ; italics: Ҋ ҋ) is a letter of the Cyrillic script. It is derived from the Cyrillic letter Short I (Й й) by adding a tail to the right leg.

Short I with tail is used only in the alphabet of the Kildin Sami language to represent the voiceless palatal approximant /j̊/ (similar to the h in huge); the Cyrillic letter Je (Ј ј) may also be used.

== Computing codes ==
Character information
Preview	Ҋ		ҋ	
Unicode name	CYRILLIC CAPITAL LETTER; SHORT I WITH TAIL		CYRILLIC SMALL LETTER; SHORT I WITH TAIL	
Encodings	decimal	hex	dec	hex
Unicode	1162	U+048A	1163	U+048B
UTF-8	210 138	D2 8A	210 139	D2 8B
Numeric character reference	&#1162;	&#x48A;	&#1163;	&#x48B;

== See also ==
- И и : Cyrillic letter I
- Cyrillic characters in Unicode
