= Ka with stroke =

Cyrillic letter used for /qʼ/ in Abkhaz

- Ҟ ҟ

Usage
- Writing system: Cyrillic
- Type: Alphabetic
- Sound values: /qʼ/

Ka with stroke (Ҟ ҟ; italics: Ҟ ҟ) is a letter of the Cyrillic script. It is formed from the Cyrillic letter Ka (К к) by adding a stroke through the upper part of the vertical stem of the letter.

Ka with stroke is used in the Cyrillic alphabet of the Abkhaz language to represent the uvular ejective /qʼ/. It is the 26th letter of the alphabet, placed between the digraphs ⟨Қә⟩ and ⟨Ҟь⟩. The digraph ⟨Ҟь⟩ contains Ka with stroke, and represents a palatalized uvular ejective.

== Computing codes ==
Character information
Preview	Ҟ		ҟ	
Unicode name	CYRILLIC CAPITAL LETTER; KA WITH STROKE		CYRILLIC SMALL LETTER; KA WITH STROKE	
Encodings	decimal	hex	dec	hex
Unicode	1182	U+049E	1183	U+049F
UTF-8	210 158	D2 9E	210 159	D2 9F
Numeric character reference	&#1182;	&#x49E;	&#1183;	&#x49F;

== See also ==
- Ꝁ ꝁ : K with stroke
- Cyrillic characters in Unicode
