= Pokrytie =

Cyrillic diacritical mark

◌҇

Pokrytie
- U+0487 ◌҇ COMBINING CYRILLIC POKRYTIE

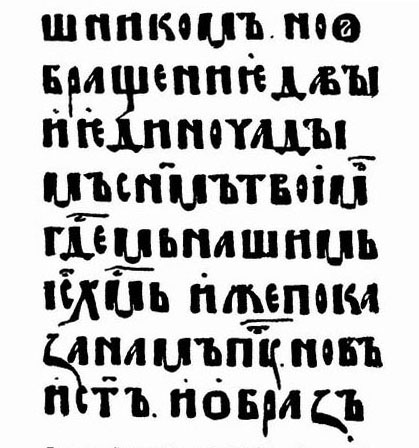
An example of multiple usage of letter-titlos in a Russian manuscript, c. 1400

Pokrytie ( ҇ ) is one of the historic diacritical signs of Cyrillic that was used in Old Church Slavonic, later medieval Cyrillic literary traditions and modern Church Slavonic.

It is a modification of titlo adapted for covering (hence its name, Old Slavonic for 'covering') combining Cyrillic letters (so called letter-titlos). It is conventionally not used with combining modifications of letters Д, Ж, З and Х, although exceptions happen, especially in skoropis.

The character was introduced into Unicode 5.1 in April 2008.

== See also ==
- Old Church Slavonic
- Cyrillic characters in Unicode
