= Che with diaeresis =

Cyrillic letter

- Ӵ ӵ

Usage
- Writing system: Cyrillic
- Type: Alphabetic
- Sound values: /tʃ/

Che with diaeresis (Ӵ ӵ; italics: Ӵ ӵ) is a letter of the Cyrillic script. Its form is derived from the Cyrillic letter Che (Ч ч Ч ч).

Che with diaeresis is used only in the alphabet of the Udmurt language, where it represents the voiceless palato-alveolar affricate /tʃ/, like the pronunciation of ⟨ch⟩ in "chicken". It is the thirtieth letter of this alphabet.

== Computing codes ==
Character information
Preview	Ӵ		ӵ	
Unicode name	CYRILLIC CAPITAL LETTER; CHE WITH DIAERESIS		CYRILLIC SMALL LETTER; CHE WITH DIAERESIS	
Encodings	decimal	hex	dec	hex
Unicode	1268	U+04F4	1269	U+04F5
UTF-8	211 180	D3 B4	211 181	D3 B5
Numeric character reference	&#1268;	&#x4F4;	&#1269;	&#x4F5;

== See also ==
- Cyrillic characters in Unicode
