= Oe with diaeresis =

Cyrillic letter used in three languages

- Ӫ ӫ

Usage
- Writing system: Cyrillic
- Type: Alphabetic
- Sound values: [ø~ʏ], [ɵ~ɞ]

Oe with diaeresis (Ӫ ӫ; italics: Ӫ ӫ) is a letter of the Cyrillic script, used in the Even, Khanty and Northwestern Mari languages.

== Usage ==
In the Even language, this letter represents the close-mid front rounded vowel /ø/ or the near-close near-front rounded vowel /ʏ/.

In the Khanty language, this letter represents the close-mid central rounded vowel /ɵ/ or the open-mid central rounded vowel /ɞ/.

== Computing codes ==
Character information
Preview	Ӫ		ӫ	
Unicode name	CYRILLIC CAPITAL LETTER; BARRED O WITH DIAERESIS		CYRILLIC SMALL LETTER; BARRED O WITH DIAERESIS	
Encodings	decimal	hex	dec	hex
Unicode	1258	U+04EA	1259	U+04EB
UTF-8	211 170	D3 AA	211 171	D3 AB
Numeric character reference	&#1258;	&#x4EA;	&#1259;	&#x4EB;

== See also ==
- Ө ө : Cyrillic letter Oe
- Ö ö : Latin letter Ö
- Ő ő : Latin letter Ő - a Hungarian letter.
