= I with macron (Cyrillic) =

Cyrillic letter

Usage
- Writing system: Cyrillic
- Type: Alphabetic

Long I or I with macron (Ӣ ӣ; italics: Ӣ ӣ) is a letter of the Cyrillic script. In Tajik, it represents a stressed close front unrounded vowel /i/ at the end of a word. In Kildin Sami on the Kola Peninsula and Mansi in western Siberia, it represents long /iː/. Both these sounds are pronounced like the ee in “feet”. In those languages, vowel length is distinctive, and the macron marks the long version of vowels.

I with macron is also used in Aleut (Bering dialect). It is the sixteenth letter of the modern Aleut alphabet. It looks similar to the Short I (Й й Й й) and often written identically in some cursive scripts. It is also used to substitute this letter in some fonts.

I with macron also appears in the Bulgarian and Serbian languages.

== Usage ==
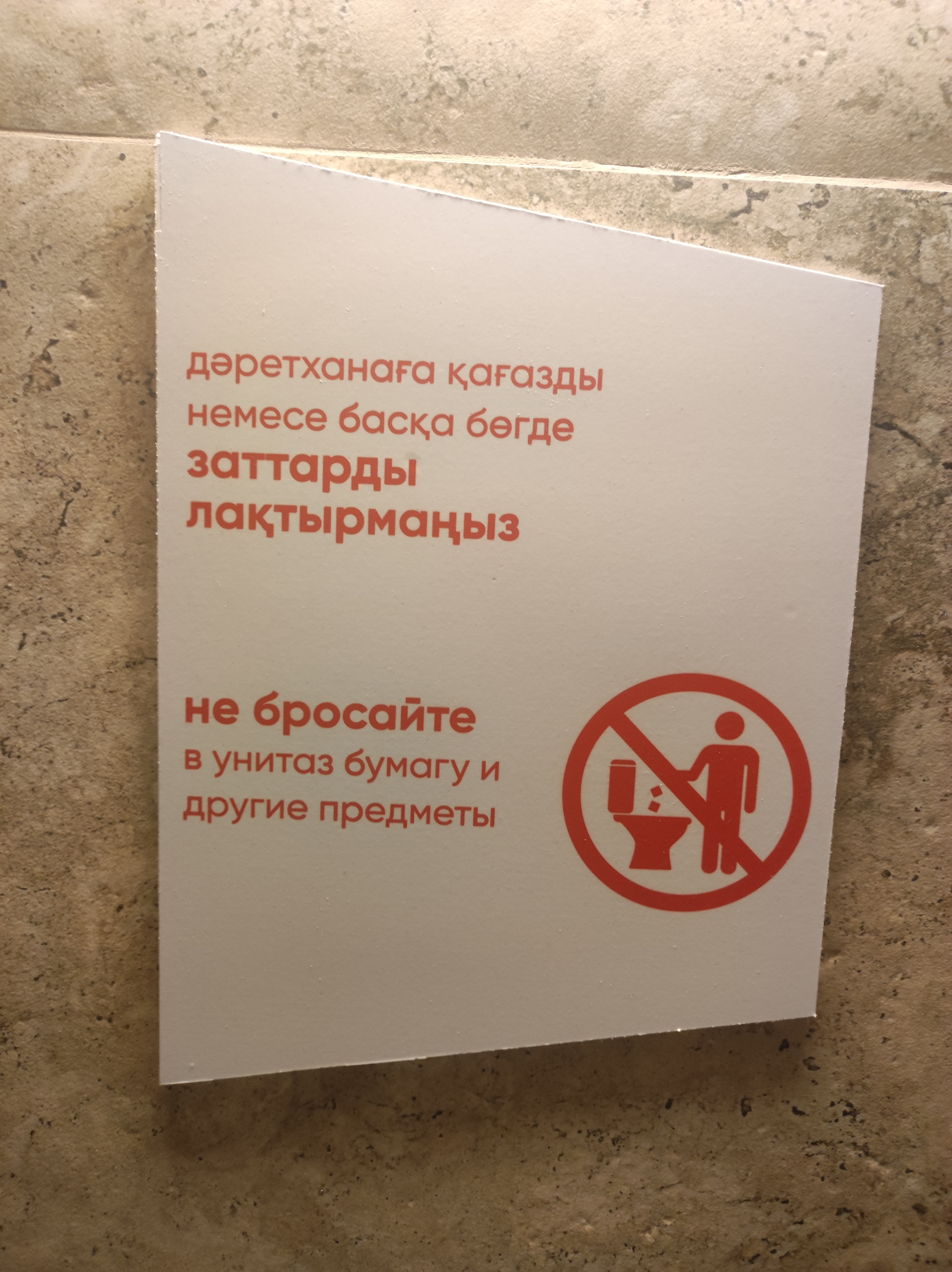
Ӣ is used by some fonts to stylistically portray the letter Й

=== South Slavic languages ===
I with macron is used in some of the South Slavic languages, mainly Bulgarian and Serbian for two-syllable offset based on the old Slavic accent law, to become easy for the accent analogy to pass in separate words, to become lexical. as the analogy passed through three-syllable oxytones with a tonal pattern: тетӣвà. I with macron is also sometimes used as a form of Short I.

== Computing codes ==
Character information
Preview	Ӣ		ӣ	
Unicode name	CYRILLIC CAPITAL LETTER; I WITH MACRON		CYRILLIC SMALL LETTER; I WITH MACRON	
Encodings	decimal	hex	dec	hex
Unicode	1250	U+04E2	1251	U+04E3
UTF-8	211 162	D3 A2	211 163	D3 A3
Numeric character reference	&#1250;	&#x4E2;	&#1251;	&#x4E3;

== See also ==
- И и : Cyrillic letter I
- Й й : Cyrillic letter Short I
- Ī ī : Latin letter I with macron – a Latvian, Latgalian, Livonian, and Samogitian letter
- Cyrillic characters in Unicode
