= I with diaeresis (Cyrillic) =

Cyrillic letter

- Ӥ ӥ

Usage
- Writing system: Cyrillic
- Type: Alphabetic
- Sound values: [i]

History
- Development: ИУ иу: И: и: Ӥ ӥ

I with diaeresis (Ӥ ӥ; italics: Ӥ ӥ) is a letter of the Cyrillic script. It is used in the Udmurt language, where it represents the close front unrounded vowel /i/, and is used only after the non-palatalized dentals /d/, /z/, /l/, /n/, /s/ and /t/; the Cyrillic letter I (Ии) is used otherwise.

== Computing codes ==
- U+04E4 Ӥ CYRILLIC CAPITAL LETTER I WITH DIAERESIS
- U+04E5 ӥ CYRILLIC SMALL LETTER I WITH DIAERESIS

== See also ==
- Ι ι : Greek letter Iota
- Ї ї : Cyrillic letter Yi
- Ï ï : Latin letter I with diaeresis
- Cyrillic characters in Unicode
