= En with hook =

Cyrillic letter used for /ŋ/ in many languages

- Ӈ ӈ

Usage
- Writing system: Cyrillic
- Type: Alphabetic
- Sound values: /ŋ/

En with hook (Ӈ ӈ; italics: Ӈ ӈ) is a letter of the Cyrillic script. Its form is derived from the Cyrillic letter En (Н н) by adding a hook to the right leg.

En with hook commonly represents the voiced velar nasal /ŋ/, like the pronunciation of ⟨ng⟩ in "sing", in Uralic languages.

== Usage ==
En with hook is used in the alphabets of a number of languages of Siberia, including all the Chukotko-Kamchatkan and Samoyedic languages:

=== Chukotko-Kamchatkan languages ===
- Chukchi
- Koryak
- Kerek
- Alyutor
- Itelmen

=== Uralic languages ===
Several Uralic languages use the en with hook.

These include:

==== Samoyedic languages ====
- Enets
- Tundra Nenets
- Forest Nenets
- Nganasan
- Selkup

==== Other Uralic languages ====
- Kildin Sami
- Ter Sami
- Khanty
- Mansi

=== Tungusic languages ===
- Even
- Evenki
- Nanai
- Negidal
- Oroch
- Orok
- Udege
- Ulch

=== Eskimo–Aleut languages ===
- Aleut
- Chaplino dialect

=== Other languages ===
- Ket
- Nivkh

== Computing codes ==
En with Hook is encoded in Unicode as U+04C7 (for the capital) and U+04C8 (for the lowercase).

Character information
Preview	Ӈ		ӈ	
Unicode name	CYRILLIC CAPITAL LETTER; EN WITH HOOK		CYRILLIC SMALL LETTER; EN WITH HOOK	
Encodings	decimal	hex	dec	hex
Unicode	1223	U+04C7	1224	U+04C8
UTF-8	211 135	D3 87	211 136	D3 88
Numeric character reference	&#1223;	&#x4C7;	&#1224;	&#x4C8;

== See also ==
- Ң ң : Cyrillic letter En with descender
- Ӊ ӊ : Cyrillic letter En with tail
- Ҥ ҥ : Cyrillic ligature En Ge
- Ԩ ԩ : Cyrillic letter En with left hook
- Ŋ ŋ : Latin letter Eng
- Ꜧ ꜧ : Latin letter Heng
- Cyrillic characters in Unicode
