= En-ge =

Cyrillic letter used for /ŋ/ in various languages

- Ҥ ҥ

Usage
- Writing system: Cyrillic
- Type: Alphabetic
- Sound values: /ŋ/, formerly also /nʲ/

History
- Development: Н н and Г г: Ҥ ҥ
- Transliterations: Ṅ ṅ, Ng ng, Ŋ ŋ

En-ge (Ҥ ҥ; italics: Ҥ ҥ) is a letter of the Cyrillic script used only in non-Slavic languages. The shape of the letter originated as a ligature of the Cyrillic letters en (Н н) and ge (Г г), but en-ge is used as a separate letter in alphabets.

En-ge is used in the alphabets of the Altai languages, Meadow Mari, Tundra Yukaghir (except in some Saint Petersburg publications, where it is substituted with En with hook) and Yakut. In all of these languages, it represents the voiced velar nasal /ŋ/, like the pronunciation of 〈ng〉 in "sing".

En-ge was also used in two 19th-century alphabets for Aleut.

Ҥ is romanized using Ṅ, Ng, or even Ŋ.

== Computing codes ==
Character information
Preview	Ҥ		ҥ	
Unicode name	CYRILLIC CAPITAL LIGATURE EN GHE		CYRILLIC SMALL LIGATURE EN GHE	
Encodings	decimal	hex	dec	hex
Unicode	1188	U+04A4	1189	U+04A5
UTF-8	210 164	D2 A4	210 165	D2 A5
Numeric character reference	&#1188;	&#x4A4;	&#1189;	&#x4A5;

== Related letters and other similar characters ==
- Ң ң : Cyrillic letter en with descender
- Ӈ ӈ : Cyrillic letter en with hook
- Ŋ ŋ : Latin letter eng
- Ꞑ ꞑ : Latin letter n with descender
- 𝆦: Hauptstimme
