= Oe (Cyrillic) =

Cyrillic letter used in various languages

- Ө ө

Usage
- Writing system: Cyrillic
- Type: Alphabetic
- Sound values: Turkic: most commonly [ø~œ]; Mongolic: most commonly [o~ɵ]; Komi-Yazva: [ɤ̹̈]; Northwestern Mari: [ʊ]

History
- Development: Ο ο: О о; Ө ө

Oe or barred O (Ө ө; italics: Ө ө) is a letter of the Cyrillic script.

== Shape ==
Its form was copied from the Latin letter barred O (Ɵ ɵ) used in Jaꞑalif and other alphabets.

Despite having a similar shape, it is related neither to the Greek letter theta (Θ θ/ϑ) nor to the archaic Cyrillic letter fita (Ѳ ѳ).

== Usage ==
Oe is used in the alphabets of the Bashkir, Buryat, Kalmyk, Karakalpak, Kazakh, Komi-Yazva, Kyrgyz, Mongolian, Sakha, Selkup, Tatar and Tuvan languages.

In Turkic languages, it commonly represents the front rounded vowels /ø/ or /œ/. In Kazakh and Karakalpak, it may also express /wʉ/. In Mongolic languages, it usually represents /o/ or /ɵ/. The letter has also been adopted in the spelling of the Komi-Yazva language, where it represents a close-mid centralized back unrounded or weakly rounded vowel /ɤ̹̈/. In Kyrgyz, Mongolian and Tuvan, the Cyrillic letter can be written as a double vowel.

Language	Sound
Bashkir	[ø̝~ʏ̞~ɵ]
Buryat	[ɵ]
Kalmyk	[o~ø]
Karakalpak	[œ], [wʏ]
Kazakh	[ɵ], [ø~œ], [wʉ]
Komi-Yazva	[ɤ̹̈]
Kyrgyz	[ø~œ]
Mongolian	[o~ɵ]
Sakha	[ø]
Selkup	[ø]
Tatar	[ø̆~ɵ̆]
Tuvan	[ø]
Uilta	[o~ø]

Until a new alphabet was published in 2016, Oe was used to represent /ø/ in Negidal.

Oe is most commonly romanized as ⟨Ö⟩; but its ISO 9 transliteration is ⟨ô⟩. In 2018, there were proposals to use ⟨Ó⟩ as a romanization of Oe in Kazakh, but a year later it was certified as ⟨Ö⟩.

The International Phonetic Alphabet uses the identically shaped Latin counterpart, ɵ, to represent the close-mid central rounded vowel, and sometimes also the mid central rounded vowel.

== Computing codes ==
Character information
Preview	Ө		ө	
Unicode name	CYRILLIC CAPITAL LETTER; BARRED O		CYRILLIC SMALL LETTER; BARRED O	
Encodings	decimal	hex	dec	hex
Unicode	1256	U+04E8	1257	U+04E9
UTF-8	211 168	D3 A8	211 169	D3 A9
Numeric character reference	&#1256;	&#x4E8;	&#1257;	&#x4E9;

== See also ==
- Ö ö : O with diaeresis – a German, Azerbaijani, Estonian, Finnish, Hungarian, Icelandic, Swedish, Turkish and Turkmen letter
- Ơ ơ : Latin letter O with horn, used in Vietnamese
- Ø ø : Latin letter O with stroke, used in Danish
- Õ õ : Latin letter O with tilde, used in Estonian
- Œ œ : Ligature Oe
- О о : Cyrillic letter O
- Ӧ ӧ : Cyrillic letter O with diaeresis
- Ӫ ӫ : Cyrillic letter oe with diaeresis
