= Cyrillic script in Unicode =

Unicode script encoding

As of Unicode version 18.0, Cyrillic script is encoded across several blocks:

- Cyrillic: U+0400–U+04FF, 256 characters
- Cyrillic Supplement: U+0500–U+052F, 48 characters
- Cyrillic Extended-A: U+2DE0–U+2DFF, 32 characters
- Cyrillic Extended-B: U+A640–U+A69F, 96 characters
- Cyrillic Extended-C: U+1C80–U+1C8F, 11 characters
- Cyrillic Extended-D: U+1E030–U+1E08F, 63 characters
- Phonetic Extensions: U+1D2B & U+1D78, 2 Cyrillic characters
- Combining Half Marks: U+FE2E & U+FE2F, 2 Cyrillic characters

The characters in the range U+0400–U+045F are arranged in the same positions as ISO 8859-5, but moved upwards by 864 positions. The next characters in the Cyrillic block, range U+0460–U+0489, are historical letters, some of which are still used for Church Slavonic. The characters in the range U+048A–U+04FF and the complete Cyrillic Supplement block (U+0500–U+052F) are additional letters for various languages that are written with Cyrillic script. Two characters are in the Phonetic Extensions block: U+1D2B ᴫ CYRILLIC LETTER SMALL CAPITAL EL from the Uralic Phonetic Alphabet and U+1D78 ᵸ MODIFIER LETTER CYRILLIC EN for transcribing nasal vowels.

Unicode includes some precomposed accented Cyrillic letters; the others can be combined by adding U+0301 ́ COMBINING ACUTE ACCENT after the accented vowel (e.g., е́ у́ э́); see below.

Several diacritical marks not specific to Cyrillic can be used with Cyrillic text, including:

- in Combining Diacritical Marks block U+0300–U+036F.
  - U+0301 ◌́ COMBINING ACUTE ACCENT (as common Cyrillic stress mark).
  - U+0300 ◌̀ COMBINING GRAVE ACCENT (as stress mark in Bulgarian).
  - U+0303 ◌̃ COMBINING TILDE (in non Slavic languages)
  - U+0304 ◌̄ COMBINING MACRON (in non Slavic languages)
  - U+0306 ◌̆ COMBINING BREVE (with й but also other letters in non Slavic languages)
  - U+0307 ◌̇ COMBINING DOT ABOVE (in transliterations of other writing systems)
  - U+0308 ◌̈ COMBINING DIAERESIS (in non Slavic languages)
  - U+030A ◌̊ COMBINING RING ABOVE (in non Slavic languages)
  - U+030B ◌̋ COMBINING DOUBLE ACUTE ACCENT (in non Slavic languages)
  - U+030C ◌̌ COMBINING CARON (in non Slavic languages)
  - U+030F ◌̏ COMBINING DOUBLE GRAVE ACCENT (with ѷ in old spelling)
  - U+0311 ◌̑ COMBINING INVERTED BREVE (in 19th century Aleut alphabet)
  - U+0323 ◌̣ COMBINING DOT BELOW (in transliterations of other writing systems)
  - U+0328 ◌̨ COMBINING OGONEK (in 19th century Polish cyrillic alphabet, in 19th century Lithuanian cyrillic alphabet)
  - U+0331 ◌̱ COMBINING MACRON BELOW (in transliterations of other writing systems)
  - U+033E ◌̾ COMBINING VERTICAL TILDE (in 19th century Polish cyrillic alphabet)
- in Combining Diacritical Marks for Symbols block U+20D0–U+20F0
  - U+20DD ◌⃝ COMBINING ENCLOSING CIRCLE (as Cyrillic ten thousands sign).

In the table below, small letters are ordered according to their Unicode numbers; capital letters are placed immediately before the corresponding small letters. Standard Unicode names and canonical decompositions are included.

== Table of characters ==
Cyrillic characters
Code	Char	Name Canonical decomposition	Code	Char	Name Canonical decomposition	Comment
=== Basic Russian alphabet ===
0410	А	CYRILLIC CAPITAL LETTER A	0430	а	CYRILLIC SMALL LETTER A
0411	Б	CYRILLIC CAPITAL LETTER BE	0431	б	CYRILLIC SMALL LETTER BE
0412	В	CYRILLIC CAPITAL LETTER VE	0432	в	CYRILLIC SMALL LETTER VE
0413	Г	CYRILLIC CAPITAL LETTER GHE	0433	г	CYRILLIC SMALL LETTER GHE
0414	Д	CYRILLIC CAPITAL LETTER DE	0434	д	CYRILLIC SMALL LETTER DE
0415	Е	CYRILLIC CAPITAL LETTER IE	0435	е	CYRILLIC SMALL LETTER IE
0416	Ж	CYRILLIC CAPITAL LETTER ZHE	0436	ж	CYRILLIC SMALL LETTER ZHE
0417	З	CYRILLIC CAPITAL LETTER ZE	0437	з	CYRILLIC SMALL LETTER ZE
0418	И	CYRILLIC CAPITAL LETTER I	0438	и	CYRILLIC SMALL LETTER I
0419	Й	CYRILLIC CAPITAL LETTER SHORT I 0418 0306	0439	й	CYRILLIC SMALL LETTER SHORT I 0438 0306
041A	К	CYRILLIC CAPITAL LETTER KA	043A	к	CYRILLIC SMALL LETTER KA
041B	Л	CYRILLIC CAPITAL LETTER EL	043B	л	CYRILLIC SMALL LETTER EL
041C	М	CYRILLIC CAPITAL LETTER EM	043C	м	CYRILLIC SMALL LETTER EM
041D	Н	CYRILLIC CAPITAL LETTER EN	043D	н	CYRILLIC SMALL LETTER EN
041E	О	CYRILLIC CAPITAL LETTER O	043E	о	CYRILLIC SMALL LETTER O
041F	П	CYRILLIC CAPITAL LETTER PE	043F	п	CYRILLIC SMALL LETTER PE
0420	Р	CYRILLIC CAPITAL LETTER ER	0440	р	CYRILLIC SMALL LETTER ER
0421	С	CYRILLIC CAPITAL LETTER ES	0441	с	CYRILLIC SMALL LETTER ES
0422	Т	CYRILLIC CAPITAL LETTER TE	0442	т	CYRILLIC SMALL LETTER TE
0423	У	CYRILLIC CAPITAL LETTER U	0443	у	CYRILLIC SMALL LETTER U
0424	Ф	CYRILLIC CAPITAL LETTER EF	0444	ф	CYRILLIC SMALL LETTER EF
0425	Х	CYRILLIC CAPITAL LETTER HA	0445	х	CYRILLIC SMALL LETTER HA
0426	Ц	CYRILLIC CAPITAL LETTER TSE	0446	ц	CYRILLIC SMALL LETTER TSE
0427	Ч	CYRILLIC CAPITAL LETTER CHE	0447	ч	CYRILLIC SMALL LETTER CHE
0428	Ш	CYRILLIC CAPITAL LETTER SHA	0448	ш	CYRILLIC SMALL LETTER SHA
0429	Щ	CYRILLIC CAPITAL LETTER SHCHA	0449	щ	CYRILLIC SMALL LETTER SHCHA
042A	Ъ	CYRILLIC CAPITAL LETTER HARD SIGN	044A	ъ	CYRILLIC SMALL LETTER HARD SIGN
042B	Ы	CYRILLIC CAPITAL LETTER YERU	044B	ы	CYRILLIC SMALL LETTER YERU
042C	Ь	CYRILLIC CAPITAL LETTER SOFT SIGN	044C	ь	CYRILLIC SMALL LETTER SOFT SIGN
042D	Э	CYRILLIC CAPITAL LETTER E	044D	э	CYRILLIC SMALL LETTER E
042E	Ю	CYRILLIC CAPITAL LETTER YU	044E	ю	CYRILLIC SMALL LETTER YU
042F	Я	CYRILLIC CAPITAL LETTER YA	044F	я	CYRILLIC SMALL LETTER YA
=== Cyrillic extensions ===
0400	Ѐ	CYRILLIC CAPITAL LETTER IE WITH GRAVE; 0415 0300	0450	ѐ	CYRILLIC SMALL LETTER IE WITH GRAVE; 0435 0300	Used in Macedonian to represent a stressed Е. Not considered a separate letter, but merely the letter Е with a grave accent.
0401	Ё	CYRILLIC CAPITAL LETTER IO; 0415 0308	0451	ё	CYRILLIC SMALL LETTER IO; 0435 0308	Used in Russian, Belarusian, Rusyn, Mongolian, and others. Considered a separate letter, after the letter Е, but not collated separately from Е in Russian.
0402	Ђ	CYRILLIC CAPITAL LETTER DJE	0452	ђ	CYRILLIC SMALL LETTER DJE	Used in Serbian. Invented as a new letter, placed between Д and Е.
0403	Ѓ	CYRILLIC CAPITAL LETTER GJE; 0413 0301	0453	ѓ	CYRILLIC SMALL LETTER GJE; 0433 0301	Used in Macedonian. Considered as a new letter, placed between Д and Е.
0404	Є	CYRILLIC CAPITAL LETTER UKRAINIAN IE	0454	є	CYRILLIC SMALL LETTER UKRAINIAN IE	Used in Ukrainian, based on the Old Cyrillic yest. Considered a separate letter, placed after Е.
0405	Ѕ	CYRILLIC CAPITAL LETTER DZE	0455	ѕ	CYRILLIC SMALL LETTER DZE	Used in Macedonian and Montenegrin. Placed between З and И.
0406	І	CYRILLIC CAPITAL LETTER BYELORUSSIAN-UKRAINIAN I	0456	і	CYRILLIC SMALL LETTER BYELORUSSIAN-UKRAINIAN I	Used in Belarusian, Kazakh, Khakas, Komi, Rusyn, and Ukrainian. Replaces И in those alphabets. Known as "Dotted I" or "Decimal I" ("i desyaterichnoe").
0407	Ї	CYRILLIC CAPITAL LETTER YI; 0406 0308	0457	ї	CYRILLIC SMALL LETTER YI; 0456 0308	Used in Church Slavonic, Rusyn, and Ukrainian. Considered a separate letter, placed after І.
0408	Ј	CYRILLIC CAPITAL LETTER JE	0458	ј	CYRILLIC SMALL LETTER JE	Used in Serbian, Macedonian, Azerbaijani, Altay, and Kildin Sami. Borrowed from Latin to replace the many iotated letters in Cyrillic. Placed before К.
0409	Љ	CYRILLIC CAPITAL LETTER LJE	0459	љ	CYRILLIC SMALL LETTER LJE	Used in Serbian and Macedonian. Ligature of Л and the Russian ь. Considered a separate letter, placed after Л.
040A	Њ	CYRILLIC CAPITAL LETTER NJE	045A	њ	CYRILLIC SMALL LETTER NJE	Used in Serbian and Macedonian. Ligature of Н and the Russian ь. Considered a separate letter, placed after Н.
040B	Ћ	CYRILLIC CAPITAL LETTER TSHE	045B	ћ	CYRILLIC SMALL LETTER TSHE	Used in Serbian. Invented as a new letter, placed between Т and У.
040C	Ќ	CYRILLIC CAPITAL LETTER KJE; 041A 0301	045C	ќ	CYRILLIC SMALL LETTER KJE; 043A 0301	Used in Macedonian. Considered as a new letter, placed between Т and У.
040D	Ѝ	CYRILLIC CAPITAL LETTER I WITH GRAVE; 0418 0300	045D	ѝ	CYRILLIC SMALL LETTER I WITH GRAVE; 0438 0300	Used mostly in Bulgarian and Macedonian. Not considered a separate letter, but merely the letter И with a grave accent.
040E	Ў	CYRILLIC CAPITAL LETTER SHORT U 0423 0306	045E	ў	CYRILLIC SMALL LETTER SHORT U 0443 0306	Used in Belarusian, Dungan, Uzbek, and Siberian Yupik.
040F	Џ	CYRILLIC CAPITAL LETTER DZHE	045F	џ	CYRILLIC SMALL LETTER DZHE	Used in Serbian, Macedonian, and Abkhaz.: In Serbian and Macedonian, it is considered a separate letter, placed between Ч and Ш.; In Abkhaz, it acts like the Serbian Ђ, placed near the end of the Abkhaz alphabet, after Ҩ.
=== Historic letters ===
0460	Ѡ	CYRILLIC CAPITAL LETTER OMEGA	0461	ѡ	CYRILLIC SMALL LETTER OMEGA	From the Greek letter Ω ω
0462	Ѣ	CYRILLIC CAPITAL LETTER YAT	0463	ѣ	CYRILLIC SMALL LETTER YAT
0464	Ѥ	CYRILLIC CAPITAL LETTER IOTIFIED E	0465	ѥ	CYRILLIC SMALL LETTER IOTIFIED E
0466	Ѧ	CYRILLIC CAPITAL LETTER LITTLE YUS	0467	ѧ	CYRILLIC SMALL LETTER LITTLE YUS	Used in the early Cyrillic and Glagolitic alphabets.
0468	Ѩ	CYRILLIC CAPITAL LETTER IOTIFIED LITTLE YUS	0469	ѩ	CYRILLIC SMALL LETTER IOTIFIED LITTLE YUS	Used in the early Cyrillic and Glagolitic alphabets.
046A	Ѫ	CYRILLIC CAPITAL LETTER BIG YUS	046B	ѫ	CYRILLIC SMALL LETTER BIG YUS	Used in the early Cyrillic and Glagolitic alphabets.
046C	Ѭ	CYRILLIC CAPITAL LETTER IOTIFIED BIG YUS	046D	ѭ	CYRILLIC SMALL LETTER IOTIFIED BIG YUS	Used in the early Cyrillic and Glagolitic alphabets.
046E	Ѯ	CYRILLIC CAPITAL LETTER KSI	046F	ѯ	CYRILLIC SMALL LETTER KSI	From the Greek letter Ξ ξ.
0470	Ѱ	CYRILLIC CAPITAL LETTER PSI	0471	ѱ	CYRILLIC SMALL LETTER PSI	From the Greek letter Ψ ψ.
0472	Ѳ	CYRILLIC CAPITAL LETTER FITA	0473	ѳ	CYRILLIC SMALL LETTER FITA	From the Greek letter Θ θ.
0474	Ѵ	CYRILLIC CAPITAL LETTER IZHITSA	0475	ѵ	CYRILLIC SMALL LETTER IZHITSA	From the Greek letter Υ υ or Glagolitic Ⱛ ⱛ.
0476	Ѷ	CYRILLIC CAPITAL LETTER IZHITSA WITH DOUBLE GRAVE ACCENT; 0474 030F	0477	ѷ	CYRILLIC SMALL LETTER IZHITSA WITH DOUBLE GRAVE ACCENT; 0475 030F
0478	Ѹ	CYRILLIC CAPITAL LETTER UK	0479	ѹ	CYRILLIC SMALL LETTER UK	May be rendered as either monograph or digraph form: For the monograph form, the preferred characters are A64A and A64B (Ꙋ and ꙋ); For the digraph form, the preferred character sequences are 041E 0443 and 043E 0443 (ОУ and оу)
047A	Ѻ	CYRILLIC CAPITAL LETTER ROUND OMEGA	047B	ѻ	CYRILLIC SMALL LETTER ROUND OMEGA
047C	Ѽ	CYRILLIC CAPITAL LETTER OMEGA WITH TITLO	047D	ѽ	CYRILLIC SMALL LETTER OMEGA WITH TITLO	Cyrillic "beautiful omega" Despite its character name, this letter does not have a titlo, nor is it composed of an omega plus a diacritic
047E	Ѿ	CYRILLIC CAPITAL LETTER OT	047F	ѿ	CYRILLIC SMALL LETTER OT
0480	Ҁ	CYRILLIC CAPITAL LETTER KOPPA	0481	ҁ	CYRILLIC SMALL LETTER KOPPA	From the ancient Greek Ϙ
=== Historic miscellaneous ===
0482	҂	CYRILLIC THOUSANDS SIGN
0483	҃	COMBINING CYRILLIC TITLO				Not used with letter titlos.
0484	҄	COMBINING CYRILLIC PALATALIZATION
0485	҅	COMBINING CYRILLIC DASIA PNEUMATA
0486	҆	COMBINING CYRILLIC PSILI PNEUMATA
0487	҇	COMBINING CYRILLIC POKRYTIE				Used only with letter titlos.
0488	҈	COMBINING CYRILLIC HUNDRED THOUSANDS SIGN				Use 20DD for ten thousands sign.
0489	҉	COMBINING CYRILLIC MILLIONS SIGN
=== Extended Cyrillic ===
048A	Ҋ	CYRILLIC CAPITAL LETTER SHORT I WITH TAIL	048B	ҋ	CYRILLIC SMALL LETTER SHORT I WITH TAIL	Kildin Sami
048C	Ҍ	CYRILLIC CAPITAL LETTER SEMISOFT SIGN	048D	ҍ	CYRILLIC SMALL LETTER SEMISOFT SIGN	Kildin Sami
048E	Ҏ	CYRILLIC CAPITAL LETTER ER WITH TICK	048F	ҏ	CYRILLIC SMALL LETTER ER WITH TICK	Kildin Sami
0490	Ґ	CYRILLIC CAPITAL LETTER GHE WITH UPTURN	0491	ґ	CYRILLIC SMALL LETTER GHE WITH UPTURN	Belarusian, Rusyn, Ukrainian
0492	Ғ	CYRILLIC CAPITAL LETTER GHE WITH STROKE	0493	ғ	CYRILLIC SMALL LETTER GHE WITH STROKE	Azerbaijani, Bashkir, Kazakh; full bar form preferred over half-barred "F"-type.
0494	Ҕ	CYRILLIC CAPITAL LETTER GHE WITH MIDDLE HOOK	0495	ҕ	CYRILLIC SMALL LETTER GHE WITH MIDDLE HOOK	Used in Yakut, as well as inolder orthographies for Abkhaz.
0496	Җ	CYRILLIC CAPITAL LETTER ZHE WITH DESCENDER	0497	җ	CYRILLIC SMALL LETTER ZHE WITH DESCENDER	Dungan, Kalmyk, Tatar, Turkmen
0498	Ҙ	CYRILLIC CAPITAL LETTER ZE WITH DESCENDER	0499	ҙ	CYRILLIC SMALL LETTER ZE WITH DESCENDER	Bashkir; letterforms with right hooks are preferred, although occasional variants with left hooks occur.
049A	Қ	CYRILLIC CAPITAL LETTER KA WITH DESCENDER	049B	қ	CYRILLIC SMALL LETTER KA WITH DESCENDER	Used in Abkhaz, Kazakh, Tajik, Uyghur, and Uzbek.
049C	Ҝ	CYRILLIC CAPITAL LETTER KA WITH VERTICAL STROKE	049D	ҝ	CYRILLIC SMALL LETTER KA WITH VERTICAL STROKE	Azerbaijani
049E	Ҟ	CYRILLIC CAPITAL LETTER KA WITH STROKE	049F	ҟ	CYRILLIC SMALL LETTER KA WITH STROKE	Abkhaz
04A0	Ҡ	CYRILLIC CAPITAL LETTER BASHKIR KA	04A1	ҡ	CYRILLIC SMALL LETTER BASHKIR KA
04A2	Ң	CYRILLIC CAPITAL LETTER EN WITH DESCENDER	04A3	ң	CYRILLIC SMALL LETTER EN WITH DESCENDER	Used in Bashkir, Karakalpak, Kazakh, Kyrgyz, Tatar, Turkmen, and Uyghur, among others.
04A4	Ҥ	CYRILLIC CAPITAL LIGATURE EN GHE	04A5	ҥ	CYRILLIC SMALL LIGATURE EN GHE	Altay, Mari, Yakut; this is not a decomposable ligature.
04A6	Ҧ	CYRILLIC CAPITAL LETTER PE WITH MIDDLE HOOK	04A7	ҧ	CYRILLIC SMALL LETTER PE WITH MIDDLE HOOK	Used in older orthographies for Abkhaz.
04A8	Ҩ	CYRILLIC CAPITAL LETTER ABKHASIAN HA	04A9	ҩ	CYRILLIC SMALL LETTER ABKHASIAN HA
04AA	Ҫ	CYRILLIC CAPITAL LETTER ES WITH DESCENDER	04AB	ҫ	CYRILLIC SMALL LETTER ES WITH DESCENDER	Bashkir, Chuvash; letterforms with right hooks are preferred, although occasional variants with left hooks occur; in Chuvashia, letterforms identical to or similar in form to 00E7 regularly occur.
04AC	Ҭ	CYRILLIC CAPITAL LETTER TE WITH DESCENDER	04AD	ҭ	CYRILLIC SMALL LETTER TE WITH DESCENDER	Abkhaz
04AE	Ү	CYRILLIC CAPITAL LETTER STRAIGHT U	04AF	ү	CYRILLIC SMALL LETTER STRAIGHT U	Azerbaijani, Bashkir, Mongolian ... ; stem is straight, unlike letter U.
04B0	Ұ	CYRILLIC CAPITAL LETTER STRAIGHT U WITH STROKE	04B1	ұ	CYRILLIC SMALL LETTER STRAIGHT U WITH STROKE	Kazakh
04B2	Ҳ	CYRILLIC CAPITAL LETTER HA WITH DESCENDER	04B3	ҳ	CYRILLIC SMALL LETTER HA WITH DESCENDER	Abkhaz, Tajik, Uzbek
04B4	Ҵ	CYRILLIC CAPITAL LIGATURE TE TSE	04B5	ҵ	CYRILLIC SMALL LIGATURE TE TSE	Abkhaz; this is not a decomposable ligature.
04B6	Ҷ	CYRILLIC CAPITAL LETTER CHE WITH DESCENDER	04B7	ҷ	CYRILLIC SMALL LETTER CHE WITH DESCENDER	Abkhaz, Tajik
04B8	Ҹ	CYRILLIC CAPITAL LETTER CHE WITH VERTICAL STROKE	04B9	ҹ	CYRILLIC SMALL LETTER CHE WITH VERTICAL STROKE	Azerbaijani
04BA	Һ	CYRILLIC CAPITAL LETTER SHHA	04BB	һ	CYRILLIC SMALL LETTER SHHA	Azerbaijani, Bashkir, ... ; originally derived from Latin "h", but uppercase form 04BA is closer to an inverted che (0427).
04BC	Ҽ	CYRILLIC CAPITAL LETTER ABKHASIAN CHE	04BD	ҽ	CYRILLIC SMALL LETTER ABKHASIAN CHE
04BE	Ҿ	CYRILLIC CAPITAL LETTER ABKHASIAN CHE WITH DESCENDER	04BF	ҿ	CYRILLIC SMALL LETTER ABKHASIAN CHE WITH DESCENDER	Some older Abkhaz fonts show a descender shaped like a right hook (ogonek or reversed comma shape).
04C0	Ӏ	CYRILLIC LETTER PALOCHKA	04CF	ӏ	CYRILLIC SMALL LETTER PALOCHKA	Aspiration sign in many Caucasian languages; is usually not cased, but the formal lowercase is 04CF.
04C1	Ӂ	CYRILLIC CAPITAL LETTER ZHE WITH BREVE; 0416 0306	04C2	ӂ	CYRILLIC SMALL LETTER ZHE WITH BREVE; 0436 0306	Moldavian
04C3	Ӄ	CYRILLIC CAPITAL LETTER KA WITH HOOK	04C4	ӄ	CYRILLIC SMALL LETTER KA WITH HOOK	Khanty, Chukchi
04C5	Ӆ	CYRILLIC CAPITAL LETTER EL WITH TAIL	04C6	ӆ	CYRILLIC SMALL LETTER EL WITH TAIL	Kildin Sami
04C7	Ӈ	CYRILLIC CAPITAL LETTER EN WITH HOOK	04C8	ӈ	CYRILLIC SMALL LETTER EN WITH HOOK	Khanty, Chukchi, Nenets
04C9	Ӊ	CYRILLIC CAPITAL LETTER EN WITH TAIL	04CA	ӊ	CYRILLIC SMALL LETTER EN WITH TAIL	Kildin Sami
04CB	Ӌ	CYRILLIC CAPITAL LETTER KHAKASSIAN CHE	04CC	ӌ	CYRILLIC SMALL LETTER KHAKASSIAN CHE
04CD	Ӎ	CYRILLIC CAPITAL LETTER EM WITH TAIL	04CE	ӎ	CYRILLIC SMALL LETTER EM WITH TAIL	Kildin Sami
04D0	Ӑ	CYRILLIC CAPITAL LETTER A WITH BREVE; 0410 0306	04D1	ӑ	CYRILLIC SMALL LETTER A WITH BREVE; 0430 0306
04D2	Ӓ	CYRILLIC CAPITAL LETTER A WITH DIAERESIS; 0410 0308	04D3	ӓ	CYRILLIC SMALL LETTER A WITH DIAERESIS; 0430 0308
04D4	Ӕ	CYRILLIC CAPITAL LIGATURE A IE	04D5	ӕ	CYRILLIC SMALL LIGATURE A IE	This is not a decomposable ligature.
04D6	Ӗ	CYRILLIC CAPITAL LETTER IE WITH BREVE; 0415 0306	04D7	ӗ	CYRILLIC SMALL LETTER IE WITH BREVE; 435 0306
04D8	Ә	CYRILLIC CAPITAL LETTER SCHWA	04D9	ә	CYRILLIC SMALL LETTER SCHWA
04DA	Ӛ	CYRILLIC CAPITAL LETTER SCHWA WITH DIAERESIS; 04D8 0308	04DB	ӛ	CYRILLIC SMALL LETTER SCHWA WITH DIAERESIS; 04D9 0308
04DC	Ӝ	CYRILLIC CAPITAL LETTER ZHE WITH DIAERESIS; 0416 0308	04DD	ӝ	CYRILLIC SMALL LETTER ZHE WITH DIAERESIS; 0436 0308
04DE	Ӟ	CYRILLIC CAPITAL LETTER ZE WITH DIAERESIS; 0417 0308	04DF	ӟ	CYRILLIC SMALL LETTER ZE WITH DIAERESIS; 0437 0308
04E0	Ӡ	CYRILLIC CAPITAL LETTER ABKHASIAN DZE	04E1	ӡ	CYRILLIC SMALL LETTER ABKHASIAN DZE
04E2	Ӣ	CYRILLIC CAPITAL LETTER I WITH MACRON; 0418 0304	04E3	ӣ	CYRILLIC SMALL LETTER I WITH MACRON; 0438 0304
04E4	Ӥ	CYRILLIC CAPITAL LETTER I WITH DIAERESIS; 0418 0308	04E5	ӥ	CYRILLIC SMALL LETTER I WITH DIAERESIS; 0438 0308
04E6	Ӧ	CYRILLIC CAPITAL LETTER O WITH DIAERESIS; 041E 0308	04E7	ӧ	CYRILLIC SMALL LETTER O WITH DIAERESIS; 043E 0308
04E8	Ө	CYRILLIC CAPITAL LETTER BARRED O	04E9	ө	CYRILLIC SMALL LETTER BARRED O
04EA	Ӫ	CYRILLIC CAPITAL LETTER BARRED O WITH DIAERESIS; 04E8 0308	04EB	ӫ	CYRILLIC SMALL LETTER BARRED O WITH DIAERESIS; 04E9 0308
04EC	Ӭ	CYRILLIC CAPITAL LETTER E WITH DIAERESIS; 042D 0308	04ED	ӭ	CYRILLIC SMALL LETTER E WITH DIAERESIS; 044D 0308	Kildin Sami
04EE	Ӯ	CYRILLIC CAPITAL LETTER U WITH MACRON; 0423 0304	04EF	ӯ	CYRILLIC SMALL LETTER U WITH MACRON; 0443 0304
04F0	Ӱ	CYRILLIC CAPITAL LETTER U WITH DIAERESIS; 0423 0308	04F1	ӱ	CYRILLIC SMALL LETTER U WITH DIAERESIS; 0443 0308
04F2	Ӳ	CYRILLIC CAPITAL LETTER U WITH DOUBLE ACUTE; 0423 030B	04F3	ӳ	CYRILLIC SMALL LETTER U WITH DOUBLE ACUTE; 0443 030B
04F4	Ӵ	CYRILLIC CAPITAL LETTER CHE WITH DIAERESIS; 0427 0308	04F5	ӵ	CYRILLIC SMALL LETTER CHE WITH DIAERESIS; 0447 0308
04F6	Ӷ	CYRILLIC CAPITAL LETTER GHE WITH DESCENDER	04F7	ӷ	CYRILLIC SMALL LETTER GHE WITH DESCENDER	Yupik
04F8	Ӹ	CYRILLIC CAPITAL LETTER YERU WITH DIAERESIS; 042B 0308	04F9	ӹ	CYRILLIC SMALL LETTER YERU WITH DIAERESIS; 044B 0308
=== Additions for Nivkh ===
04FA	Ӻ	CYRILLIC CAPITAL LETTER GHE WITH STROKE AND HOOK	04FB	ӻ	CYRILLIC SMALL LETTER GHE WITH STROKE AND HOOK
04FC	Ӽ	CYRILLIC CAPITAL LETTER HA WITH HOOK	04FD	ӽ	CYRILLIC SMALL LETTER HA WITH HOOK
04FE	Ӿ	CYRILLIC CAPITAL LETTER HA WITH STROKE	04FF	ӿ	CYRILLIC SMALL LETTER HA WITH STROKE
=== Komi letters ===
0500	Ԁ	CYRILLIC CAPITAL LETTER KOMI DE	0501	ԁ	CYRILLIC SMALL LETTER KOMI DE
0502	Ԃ	CYRILLIC CAPITAL LETTER KOMI DJE	0503	ԃ	CYRILLIC SMALL LETTER KOMI DJE
0504	Ԅ	CYRILLIC CAPITAL LETTER KOMI ZJE	0505	ԅ	CYRILLIC SMALL LETTER KOMI ZJE
0506	Ԇ	CYRILLIC CAPITAL LETTER KOMI DZJE	0507	ԇ	CYRILLIC SMALL LETTER KOMI DZJE
0508	Ԉ	CYRILLIC CAPITAL LETTER KOMI LJE	0509	ԉ	CYRILLIC SMALL LETTER KOMI LJE
050A	Ԋ	CYRILLIC CAPITAL LETTER KOMI NJE	050B	ԋ	CYRILLIC SMALL LETTER KOMI NJE
050C	Ԍ	CYRILLIC CAPITAL LETTER KOMI SJE	050D	ԍ	CYRILLIC SMALL LETTER KOMI SJE
050E	Ԏ	CYRILLIC CAPITAL LETTER KOMI TJE	050F	ԏ	CYRILLIC SMALL LETTER KOMI TJE
=== Khanty letters ===
0510	Ԑ	CYRILLIC CAPITAL LETTER REVERSED ZE	0511	ԑ	CYRILLIC SMALL LETTER REVERSED ZE	Also used for Enets.
0512	Ԓ	CYRILLIC CAPITAL LETTER EL WITH HOOK	0513	ԓ	CYRILLIC SMALL LETTER EL WITH HOOK	Also used for Chukchi and Itelmen.
052E	Ԯ	CYRILLIC CAPITAL LETTER EL WITH DESCENDER	052F	ԯ	CYRILLIC SMALL LETTER EL WITH DESCENDER
1C89	Ᲊ	CYRILLIC CAPITAL LETTER TJE	1C8A	ᲊ	CYRILLIC SMALL LETTER TJE
=== Mordvin letters ===
0514	Ԕ	CYRILLIC CAPITAL LETTER LHA	0515	ԕ	CYRILLIC SMALL LETTER LHA	= voiceless l; ligatures of Л and Х; л and х
0516	Ԗ	CYRILLIC CAPITAL LETTER RHA	0517	ԗ	CYRILLIC SMALL LETTER RHA	= voiceless r; ligatures of Р and Х; р and х
0518	Ԙ	CYRILLIC CAPITAL LETTER YAE	0519	ԙ	CYRILLIC SMALL LETTER YAE	Ligatures of Я and Е; я and е
=== Kurdish letters ===
051A	Ԛ	CYRILLIC CAPITAL LETTER QA	051B	ԛ	CYRILLIC SMALL LETTER QA	Based on the Latin letter Q q
051C	Ԝ	CYRILLIC CAPITAL LETTER WE	051D	ԝ	CYRILLIC SMALL LETTER WE	Based on the Latin letter W w
=== Aleut letters ===
051E	Ԟ	CYRILLIC CAPITAL LETTER ALEUT KA	051F	ԟ	CYRILLIC SMALL LETTER ALEUT KA	Used for [q] in Aleut.
=== Chuvash letters ===
0520	Ԡ	CYRILLIC CAPITAL LETTER EL WITH MIDDLE HOOK	0521	ԡ	CYRILLIC SMALL LETTER EL WITH MIDDLE HOOK	= palatalized l
0522	Ԣ	CYRILLIC CAPITAL LETTER EN WITH MIDDLE HOOK	0523	ԣ	CYRILLIC SMALL LETTER EN WITH MIDDLE HOOK	= palatalized n
=== Abkhazian letters ===
0524	Ԥ	CYRILLIC CAPITAL LETTER PE WITH DESCENDER	0525	ԥ	CYRILLIC SMALL LETTER PE WITH DESCENDER	Used in modern Abkhaz orthography.
=== Azerbaijani letters ===
0526	Ԧ	CYRILLIC CAPITAL LETTER SHHA WITH DESCENDER	0527	ԧ	CYRILLIC SMALL LETTER SHHA WITH DESCENDER
=== Orok letters ===
0528	Ԩ	CYRILLIC CAPITAL LETTER EN WITH LEFT HOOK	0529	ԩ	CYRILLIC SMALL LETTER EN WITH LEFT HOOK
=== Komi letters ===
052A	Ԫ	CYRILLIC CAPITAL LETTER DZZHE	052B	ԫ	CYRILLIC SMALL LETTER DZZHE
052C	Ԭ	CYRILLIC CAPITAL LETTER DCHE	052D	ԭ	CYRILLIC SMALL LETTER DCHE
=== Historic letter variants ===
1C80	ᲀ	CYRILLIC SMALL LETTER ROUNDED VE
1C81	ᲁ	CYRILLIC SMALL LETTER LONG-LEGGED DE
1C82	ᲂ	CYRILLIC SMALL LETTER NARROW O
1C83	ᲃ	CYRILLIC SMALL LETTER WIDE ES
1C84	ᲄ	CYRILLIC SMALL LETTER TALL TE
1C85	ᲅ	CYRILLIC SMALL LETTER THREE-LEGGED TE
1C86	ᲆ	CYRILLIC SMALL LETTER TALL HARD SIGN
1C87	ᲇ	CYRILLIC SMALL LETTER TALL YAT
1C88	ᲈ	CYRILLIC SMALL LETTER UNBLENDED UK
=== Miscellaneous characters ===
1D2B	ᴫ	CYRILLIC LETTER SMALL CAPITAL EL	Phonetic transcription			In italic style, the glyph is obliqued, not italicized.
1D78	ᵸ	MODIFIER LETTER CYRILLIC EN	Phonetic transcription
20DD	⃝	COMBINING ENCLOSING CIRCLE	Used as Cyrillic combining ten thousands sign; symbol for myriads
=== Old Church Slavonic combining letters ===
2DE0	ⷠ	COMBINING CYRILLIC LETTER BE
2DE1	ⷡ	COMBINING CYRILLIC LETTER VE
2DE2	ⷢ	COMBINING CYRILLIC LETTER GHE
2DE3	ⷣ	COMBINING CYRILLIC LETTER DE
2DE4	ⷤ	COMBINING CYRILLIC LETTER ZHE
2DE5	ⷥ	COMBINING CYRILLIC LETTER ZE
2DE6	ⷦ	COMBINING CYRILLIC LETTER KA
2DE7	ⷧ	COMBINING CYRILLIC LETTER EL
2DE8	ⷨ	COMBINING CYRILLIC LETTER EM
2DE9	ⷩ	COMBINING CYRILLIC LETTER EN
2DEA	ⷪ	COMBINING CYRILLIC LETTER O
2DEB	ⷫ	COMBINING CYRILLIC LETTER PE
2DEC	ⷬ	COMBINING CYRILLIC LETTER ER
2DED	ⷭ	COMBINING CYRILLIC LETTER ES
2DEE	ⷮ	COMBINING CYRILLIC LETTER TE
2DEF	ⷯ	COMBINING CYRILLIC LETTER HA
2DF0	ⷰ	COMBINING CYRILLIC LETTER TSE
2DF1	ⷱ	COMBINING CYRILLIC LETTER CHE
2DF2	ⷲ	COMBINING CYRILLIC LETTER SHA
2DF3	ⷳ	COMBINING CYRILLIC LETTER SHCHA
2DF4	ⷴ	COMBINING CYRILLIC LETTER FITA
2DF5	ⷵ	COMBINING CYRILLIC LETTER ES-TE
2DF6	ⷶ	COMBINING CYRILLIC LETTER A
2DF7	ⷷ	COMBINING CYRILLIC LETTER IE
2DF8	ⷸ	COMBINING CYRILLIC LETTER DJERV
2DF9	ⷹ	COMBINING CYRILLIC LETTER MONOGRAPH UK
2DFA	ⷺ	COMBINING CYRILLIC LETTER YAT
2DFB	ⷻ	COMBINING CYRILLIC LETTER YU
2DFC	ⷼ	COMBINING CYRILLIC LETTER IOTIFIED A
2DFD	ⷽ	COMBINING CYRILLIC LETTER LITTLE YUS
2DFE	ⷾ	COMBINING CYRILLIC LETTER BIG YUS
2DFF	ⷿ	COMBINING CYRILLIC LETTER IOTIFIED BIG YUS
A674	ꙴ	COMBINING CYRILLIC LETTER UKRAINIAN IE
A675	ꙵ	COMBINING CYRILLIC LETTER I
A676	ꙶ	COMBINING CYRILLIC LETTER YI
A677	ꙷ	COMBINING CYRILLIC LETTER U
A678	ꙸ	COMBINING CYRILLIC LETTER HARD SIGN
A679	ꙹ	COMBINING CYRILLIC LETTER YERU
A67A	ꙺ	COMBINING CYRILLIC LETTER SOFT SIGN
A67B	ꙻ	COMBINING CYRILLIC LETTER OMEGA
A69E	ꚞ	COMBINING CYRILLIC LETTER EF
A69F	ꚟ	COMBINING CYRILLIC LETTER IOTIFIED E
=== Old Cyrillic ===
A640	Ꙁ	CYRILLIC CAPITAL LETTER ZEMLYA	A641	ꙁ	CYRILLIC SMALL LETTER ZEMLYA
A642	Ꙃ	CYRILLIC CAPITAL LETTER DZELO	A643	ꙃ	CYRILLIC SMALL LETTER DZELO
A644	Ꙅ	CYRILLIC CAPITAL LETTER REVERSED DZE	A645	ꙅ	CYRILLIC SMALL LETTER REVERSED DZE
A646	Ꙇ	CYRILLIC CAPITAL LETTER IOTA	A647	ꙇ	CYRILLIC SMALL LETTER IOTA
A648	Ꙉ	CYRILLIC CAPITAL LETTER DJERV	A649	ꙉ	CYRILLIC SMALL LETTER DJERV
A64A	Ꙋ	CYRILLIC CAPITAL LETTER MONOGRAPH UK	A64B	ꙋ	CYRILLIC SMALL LETTER MONOGRAPH UK
A64C	Ꙍ	CYRILLIC CAPITAL LETTER BROAD OMEGA	A64D	ꙍ	CYRILLIC SMALL LETTER BROAD OMEGA
A64E	Ꙏ	CYRILLIC CAPITAL LETTER NEUTRAL YER	A64F	ꙏ	CYRILLIC SMALL LETTER NEUTRAL YER
A650	Ꙑ	CYRILLIC CAPITAL LETTER YERU WITH BACK YER	A651	ꙑ	CYRILLIC SMALL LETTER YERU WITH BACK YER
A652	Ꙓ	CYRILLIC CAPITAL LETTER IOTIFIED YAT	A653	ꙓ	CYRILLIC SMALL LETTER IOTIFIED YAT
A654	Ꙕ	CYRILLIC CAPITAL LETTER REVERSED YU	A655	ꙕ	CYRILLIC SMALL LETTER REVERSED YU
A656	Ꙗ	CYRILLIC CAPITAL LETTER IOTIFIED A	A657	ꙗ	CYRILLIC SMALL LETTER IOTIFIED A
A658	Ꙙ	CYRILLIC CAPITAL LETTER CLOSED LITTLE YUS	A659	ꙙ	CYRILLIC SMALL LETTER CLOSED LITTLE YUS
A65A	Ꙛ	CYRILLIC CAPITAL LETTER BLENDED YUS	A65B	ꙛ	CYRILLIC SMALL LETTER BLENDED YUS
A65C	Ꙝ	CYRILLIC CAPITAL LETTER IOTIFIED CLOSED LITTLE YUS	A65D	ꙝ	CYRILLIC SMALL LETTER IOTIFIED CLOSED LITTLE YUS
A65E	Ꙟ	CYRILLIC CAPITAL LETTER YN	A65F	ꙟ	CYRILLIC SMALL LETTER YN	Romanian Cyrillic
A660	Ꙡ	CYRILLIC CAPITAL LETTER REVERSED TSE	A661	ꙡ	CYRILLIC SMALL LETTER REVERSED TSE
A662	Ꙣ	CYRILLIC CAPITAL LETTER SOFT DE	A663	ꙣ	CYRILLIC SMALL LETTER SOFT DE
A664	Ꙥ	CYRILLIC CAPITAL LETTER SOFT EL	A665	ꙥ	CYRILLIC SMALL LETTER SOFT EL
A666	Ꙧ	CYRILLIC CAPITAL LETTER SOFT EM	A667	ꙧ	CYRILLIC SMALL LETTER SOFT EM
A668	Ꙩ	CYRILLIC CAPITAL LETTER MONOCULAR O	A669	ꙩ	CYRILLIC SMALL LETTER MONOCULAR O	Used in words based on the root for 'eye'.
A66A	Ꙫ	CYRILLIC CAPITAL LETTER BINOCULAR O	A66B	ꙫ	CYRILLIC SMALL LETTER BINOCULAR O	Used in the dual of words based on the root for 'eye'.
A66C	Ꙭ	CYRILLIC CAPITAL LETTER DOUBLE MONOCULAR O	A66D	ꙭ	CYRILLIC SMALL LETTER DOUBLE MONOCULAR O	Used in the dual of words based on the root for 'eye'.
A698	Ꚙ	CYRILLIC CAPITAL LETTER DOUBLE O	A699	ꚙ	CYRILLIC SMALL LETTER DOUBLE O
A66E	ꙮ	CYRILLIC LETTER MULTIOCULAR O				Used in the epithet 'many-eyed'.
A69A	Ꚛ	CYRILLIC CAPITAL LETTER CROSSED O	A69B	ꚛ	CYRILLIC SMALL LETTER CROSSED O
=== Abbreviation mark ===
A66F	꙯	COMBINING CYRILLIC VZMET	Used with Cyrillic letters to indicate abbreviation.
=== Combining numeric signs ===
A670	꙰	COMBINING CYRILLIC TEN MILLIONS SIGN
A671	꙱	COMBINING CYRILLIC HUNDRED MILLIONS SIGN
A672	꙲	COMBINING CYRILLIC THOUSAND MILLIONS SIGN
=== Punctuation mark ===
A673	꙳	SLAVONIC ASTERISK
=== Combining marks for Old Cyrillic ===
A67C	꙼	COMBINING CYRILLIC KAVYKA	Indicates an alternative reading to part of a word.
A67D	꙽	COMBINING CYRILLIC PAYEROK	May indicate an omitted yer.
=== Combining half marks ===
FE2E	︮	COMBINING CYRILLIC TITLO LEFT HALF
FE2F	︯	COMBINING CYRILLIC TITLO RIGHT HALF
=== Punctuation mark ===
A67E	꙾	CYRILLIC KAVYKA	Used to mark off word that has alternative reading.
=== Modifier letter ===
A67F	ꙿ	CYRILLIC PAYEROK	May indicate an omitted yer
=== Letters for Old Abkhasian orthography ===
A680	Ꚁ	CYRILLIC CAPITAL LETTER DWE	A681	ꚁ	CYRILLIC SMALL LETTER DWE
A682	Ꚃ	CYRILLIC CAPITAL LETTER DZWE	A683	ꚃ	CYRILLIC SMALL LETTER DZWE
A684	Ꚅ	CYRILLIC CAPITAL LETTER ZHWE	A685	ꚅ	CYRILLIC SMALL LETTER ZHWE
A686	Ꚇ	CYRILLIC CAPITAL LETTER CCHE	A687	ꚇ	CYRILLIC SMALL LETTER CCHE
A688	Ꚉ	CYRILLIC CAPITAL LETTER DZZE	A689	ꚉ	CYRILLIC SMALL LETTER DZZE
A68A	Ꚋ	CYRILLIC CAPITAL LETTER TE WITH MIDDLE HOOK	A68B	ꚋ	CYRILLIC SMALL LETTER TE WITH MIDDLE HOOK
A68C	Ꚍ	CYRILLIC CAPITAL LETTER TWE	A68D	ꚍ	CYRILLIC SMALL LETTER TWE
A68E	Ꚏ	CYRILLIC CAPITAL LETTER TSWE	A68F	ꚏ	CYRILLIC SMALL LETTER TSWE
A690	Ꚑ	CYRILLIC CAPITAL LETTER TSSE	A691	ꚑ	CYRILLIC SMALL LETTER TSSE
A692	Ꚓ	CYRILLIC CAPITAL LETTER TCHE	A693	ꚓ	CYRILLIC SMALL LETTER TCHE
A694	Ꚕ	CYRILLIC CAPITAL LETTER HWE	A695	ꚕ	CYRILLIC SMALL LETTER HWE
A696	Ꚗ	CYRILLIC CAPITAL LETTER SHWE	A697	ꚗ	CYRILLIC SMALL LETTER SHWE
=== Intonation marks for Lithuanian dialectology ===
A69C	ꚜ	MODIFIER LETTER CYRILLIC HARD SIGN	A69D	ꚝ	MODIFIER LETTER CYRILLIC SOFT SIGN
=== Phonetic transcription ===
1E030	𞀰	MODIFIER LETTER CYRILLIC SMALL A
1E031	𞀱	MODIFIER LETTER CYRILLIC SMALL BE
1E032	𞀲	MODIFIER LETTER CYRILLIC SMALL VE
1E033	𞀳	MODIFIER LETTER CYRILLIC SMALL GHE
1E034	𞀴	MODIFIER LETTER CYRILLIC SMALL DE
1E035	𞀵	MODIFIER LETTER CYRILLIC SMALL IE
1E036	𞀶	MODIFIER LETTER CYRILLIC SMALL ZHE
1E037	𞀷	MODIFIER LETTER CYRILLIC SMALL ZE
1E038	𞀸	MODIFIER LETTER CYRILLIC SMALL I
1E039	𞀹	MODIFIER LETTER CYRILLIC SMALL KA
1E03A	𞀺	MODIFIER LETTER CYRILLIC SMALL EL
1E03B	𞀻	MODIFIER LETTER CYRILLIC SMALL EM
1E03C	𞀼	MODIFIER LETTER CYRILLIC SMALL O
1E03D	𞀽	MODIFIER LETTER CYRILLIC SMALL PE
1E03E	𞀾	MODIFIER LETTER CYRILLIC SMALL ER
1E03F	𞀿	MODIFIER LETTER CYRILLIC SMALL ES
1E040	𞁀	MODIFIER LETTER CYRILLIC SMALL TE
1E041	𞁁	MODIFIER LETTER CYRILLIC SMALL U
1E042	𞁂	MODIFIER LETTER CYRILLIC SMALL EF
1E043	𞁃	MODIFIER LETTER CYRILLIC SMALL HA
1E044	𞁄	MODIFIER LETTER CYRILLIC SMALL TSE
1E045	𞁅	MODIFIER LETTER CYRILLIC SMALL CHE
1E046	𞁆	MODIFIER LETTER CYRILLIC SMALL SHA
1E047	𞁇	MODIFIER LETTER CYRILLIC SMALL YERU
1E048	𞁈	MODIFIER LETTER CYRILLIC SMALL E
1E049	𞁉	MODIFIER LETTER CYRILLIC SMALL YU
1E04A	𞁊	MODIFIER LETTER CYRILLIC SMALL DZZE
1E04B	𞁋	MODIFIER LETTER CYRILLIC SMALL SCHWA
1E04C	𞁌	MODIFIER LETTER CYRILLIC SMALL BYELORUSSIAN-UKRAINIAN I
1E04D	𞁍	MODIFIER LETTER CYRILLIC SMALL JE
1E04E	𞁎	MODIFIER LETTER CYRILLIC SMALL BARRED O
1E04F	𞁏	MODIFIER LETTER CYRILLIC SMALL STRAIGHT U
1E050	𞁐	MODIFIER LETTER CYRILLIC SMALL PALOCHKA
1E051	𞁑	CYRILLIC SUBSCRIPT SMALL LETTER A
1E052	𞁒	CYRILLIC SUBSCRIPT SMALL LETTER BE
1E053	𞁓	CYRILLIC SUBSCRIPT SMALL LETTER VE
1E054	𞁔	CYRILLIC SUBSCRIPT SMALL LETTER GHE
1E055	𞁕	CYRILLIC SUBSCRIPT SMALL LETTER DE
1E056	𞁖	CYRILLIC SUBSCRIPT SMALL LETTER IE
1E057	𞁗	CYRILLIC SUBSCRIPT SMALL LETTER ZHE
1E058	𞁘	CYRILLIC SUBSCRIPT SMALL LETTER ZE
1E059	𞁙	CYRILLIC SUBSCRIPT SMALL LETTER I
1E05A	𞁚	CYRILLIC SUBSCRIPT SMALL LETTER KA
1E05B	𞁛	CYRILLIC SUBSCRIPT SMALL LETTER EL
1E05C	𞁜	CYRILLIC SUBSCRIPT SMALL LETTER O
1E05D	𞁝	CYRILLIC SUBSCRIPT SMALL LETTER PE
1E05E	𞁞	CYRILLIC SUBSCRIPT SMALL LETTER ES
1E05F	𞁟	CYRILLIC SUBSCRIPT SMALL LETTER U
1E060	𞁠	CYRILLIC SUBSCRIPT SMALL LETTER EF
1E061	𞁡	CYRILLIC SUBSCRIPT SMALL LETTER HA
1E062	𞁢	CYRILLIC SUBSCRIPT SMALL LETTER TSE
1E063	𞁣	CYRILLIC SUBSCRIPT SMALL LETTER CHE
1E064	𞁤	CYRILLIC SUBSCRIPT SMALL LETTER SHA
1E065	𞁥	CYRILLIC SUBSCRIPT SMALL LETTER HARD SIGN
1E066	𞁦	CYRILLIC SUBSCRIPT SMALL LETTER YERU
1E067	𞁧	CYRILLIC SUBSCRIPT SMALL LETTER GHE WITH UPTURN
1E068	𞁨	CYRILLIC SUBSCRIPT SMALL LETTER BYELORUSSIAN-UKRAINIAN I
1E069	𞁩	CYRILLIC SUBSCRIPT SMALL LETTER DZE
1E06A	𞁪	CYRILLIC SUBSCRIPT SMALL LETTER DZHE
1E06B	𞁫	MODIFIER LETTER CYRILLIC SMALL ES WITH DESCENDER
1E06C	𞁬	MODIFIER LETTER CYRILLIC SMALL YERU WITH BACK YER
1E06D	𞁭	MODIFIER LETTER CYRILLIC SMALL STRAIGHT U WITH STROKE
1E08F	𞂏	COMBINING CYRILLIC SMALL LETTER BYELORUSSIAN-UKRAINIAN I

== Blocks ==
The Cyrillic block (U+0400 – U+04FF) was added to the Unicode Standard in October, 1991 with the release of version 1.0:

Cyrillic^{[1]} Official Unicode Consortium code chart (PDF)
	0	1	2	3	4	5	6	7	8	9	A	B	C	D	E	F
U+040x	Ѐ	Ё	Ђ	Ѓ	Є	Ѕ	І	Ї	Ј	Љ	Њ	Ћ	Ќ	Ѝ	Ў	Џ
U+041x	А	Б	В	Г	Д	Е	Ж	З	И	Й	К	Л	М	Н	О	П
U+042x	Р	С	Т	У	Ф	Х	Ц	Ч	Ш	Щ	Ъ	Ы	Ь	Э	Ю	Я
U+043x	а	б	в	г	д	е	ж	з	и	й	к	л	м	н	о	п
U+044x	р	с	т	у	ф	х	ц	ч	ш	щ	ъ	ы	ь	э	ю	я
U+045x	ѐ	ё	ђ	ѓ	є	ѕ	і	ї	ј	љ	њ	ћ	ќ	ѝ	ў	џ
U+046x	Ѡ	ѡ	Ѣ	ѣ	Ѥ	ѥ	Ѧ	ѧ	Ѩ	ѩ	Ѫ	ѫ	Ѭ	ѭ	Ѯ	ѯ
U+047x	Ѱ	ѱ	Ѳ	ѳ	Ѵ	ѵ	Ѷ	ѷ	Ѹ	ѹ	Ѻ	ѻ	Ѽ	ѽ	Ѿ	ѿ
U+048x	Ҁ	ҁ	҂	◌҃	◌҄	◌҅	◌҆	◌҇	◌҈	◌҉	Ҋ	ҋ	Ҍ	ҍ	Ҏ	ҏ
U+049x	Ґ	ґ	Ғ	ғ	Ҕ	ҕ	Җ	җ	Ҙ	ҙ	Қ	қ	Ҝ	ҝ	Ҟ	ҟ
U+04Ax	Ҡ	ҡ	Ң	ң	Ҥ	ҥ	Ҧ	ҧ	Ҩ	ҩ	Ҫ	ҫ	Ҭ	ҭ	Ү	ү
U+04Bx	Ұ	ұ	Ҳ	ҳ	Ҵ	ҵ	Ҷ	ҷ	Ҹ	ҹ	Һ	һ	Ҽ	ҽ	Ҿ	ҿ
U+04Cx	Ӏ	Ӂ	ӂ	Ӄ	ӄ	Ӆ	ӆ	Ӈ	ӈ	Ӊ	ӊ	Ӌ	ӌ	Ӎ	ӎ	ӏ
U+04Dx	Ӑ	ӑ	Ӓ	ӓ	Ӕ	ӕ	Ӗ	ӗ	Ә	ә	Ӛ	ӛ	Ӝ	ӝ	Ӟ	ӟ
U+04Ex	Ӡ	ӡ	Ӣ	ӣ	Ӥ	ӥ	Ӧ	ӧ	Ө	ө	Ӫ	ӫ	Ӭ	ӭ	Ӯ	ӯ
U+04Fx	Ӱ	ӱ	Ӳ	ӳ	Ӵ	ӵ	Ӷ	ӷ	Ӹ	ӹ	Ӻ	ӻ	Ӽ	ӽ	Ӿ	ӿ
Notes 1.As of Unicode version 18.0

The Cyrillic Supplement block (U+0500 – U+052F) was added to the Unicode Standard in March, 2002 with the release of version 3.2:

Cyrillic Supplement^{[1]} Official Unicode Consortium code chart (PDF)
	0	1	2	3	4	5	6	7	8	9	A	B	C	D	E	F
U+050x	Ԁ	ԁ	Ԃ	ԃ	Ԅ	ԅ	Ԇ	ԇ	Ԉ	ԉ	Ԋ	ԋ	Ԍ	ԍ	Ԏ	ԏ
U+051x	Ԑ	ԑ	Ԓ	ԓ	Ԕ	ԕ	Ԗ	ԗ	Ԙ	ԙ	Ԛ	ԛ	Ԝ	ԝ	Ԟ	ԟ
U+052x	Ԡ	ԡ	Ԣ	ԣ	Ԥ	ԥ	Ԧ	ԧ	Ԩ	ԩ	Ԫ	ԫ	Ԭ	ԭ	Ԯ	ԯ
Notes 1.As of Unicode version 18.0

The Cyrillic Extended-A (U+2DE0 – U+2DFF) and Cyrillic Extended-B (U+A640 – U+A69F) blocks were added to the Unicode Standard in April, 2008 with the release of version 5.1:

Cyrillic Extended-A^{[1]} Official Unicode Consortium code chart (PDF)
	0	1	2	3	4	5	6	7	8	9	A	B	C	D	E	F
U+2DEx	ⷠ	ⷡ	ⷢ	ⷣ	ⷤ	ⷥ	ⷦ	ⷧ	ⷨ	ⷩ	ⷪ	ⷫ	ⷬ	ⷭ	ⷮ	ⷯ
U+2DFx	ⷰ	ⷱ	ⷲ	ⷳ	ⷴ	ⷵ	ⷶ	ⷷ	ⷸ	ⷹ	ⷺ	ⷻ	ⷼ	ⷽ	ⷾ	ⷿ
Notes 1.As of Unicode version 18.0

Cyrillic Extended-B^{[1]} Official Unicode Consortium code chart (PDF)
	0	1	2	3	4	5	6	7	8	9	A	B	C	D	E	F
U+A64x	Ꙁ	ꙁ	Ꙃ	ꙃ	Ꙅ	ꙅ	Ꙇ	ꙇ	Ꙉ	ꙉ	Ꙋ	ꙋ	Ꙍ	ꙍ	Ꙏ	ꙏ
U+A65x	Ꙑ	ꙑ	Ꙓ	ꙓ	Ꙕ	ꙕ	Ꙗ	ꙗ	Ꙙ	ꙙ	Ꙛ	ꙛ	Ꙝ	ꙝ	Ꙟ	ꙟ
U+A66x	Ꙡ	ꙡ	Ꙣ	ꙣ	Ꙥ	ꙥ	Ꙧ	ꙧ	Ꙩ	ꙩ	Ꙫ	ꙫ	Ꙭ	ꙭ	ꙮ	꙯
U+A67x	꙰	꙱	꙲	꙳	ꙴ	ꙵ	ꙶ	ꙷ	ꙸ	ꙹ	ꙺ	ꙻ	꙼	꙽	꙾	ꙿ
U+A68x	Ꚁ	ꚁ	Ꚃ	ꚃ	Ꚅ	ꚅ	Ꚇ	ꚇ	Ꚉ	ꚉ	Ꚋ	ꚋ	Ꚍ	ꚍ	Ꚏ	ꚏ
U+A69x	Ꚑ	ꚑ	Ꚓ	ꚓ	Ꚕ	ꚕ	Ꚗ	ꚗ	Ꚙ	ꚙ	Ꚛ	ꚛ	ꚜ	ꚝ	ꚞ	ꚟ
Notes 1.As of Unicode version 18.0

The Cyrillic Extended-C block (U+1C80 – U+1C8F) was added to the Unicode Standard in June, 2016 with the release of version 9.0:

Cyrillic Extended-C^{[1]}^{[2]} Official Unicode Consortium code chart (PDF)
	0	1	2	3	4	5	6	7	8	9	A	B	C	D	E	F
U+1C8x	ᲀ	ᲁ	ᲂ	ᲃ	ᲄ	ᲅ	ᲆ	ᲇ	ᲈ	Ᲊ	ᲊ					
Notes 1.As of Unicode version 18.0 2.Grey areas indicate non-assigned code points

The Cyrillic Extended-D block (U+1E030 – U+1E08F) was added to the Unicode Standard in September, 2022 with the release of version 15.0:

Cyrillic Extended-D^{[1]}^{[2]} Official Unicode Consortium code chart (PDF)
	0	1	2	3	4	5	6	7	8	9	A	B	C	D	E	F
U+1E03x	𞀰	𞀱	𞀲	𞀳	𞀴	𞀵	𞀶	𞀷	𞀸	𞀹	𞀺	𞀻	𞀼	𞀽	𞀾	𞀿
U+1E04x	𞁀	𞁁	𞁂	𞁃	𞁄	𞁅	𞁆	𞁇	𞁈	𞁉	𞁊	𞁋	𞁌	𞁍	𞁎	𞁏
U+1E05x	𞁐	𞁑	𞁒	𞁓	𞁔	𞁕	𞁖	𞁗	𞁘	𞁙	𞁚	𞁛	𞁜	𞁝	𞁞	𞁟
U+1E06x	𞁠	𞁡	𞁢	𞁣	𞁤	𞁥	𞁦	𞁧	𞁨	𞁩	𞁪	𞁫	𞁬	𞁭		
U+1E07x																
U+1E08x																◌𞂏
Notes 1.As of Unicode version 18.0 2.Grey areas indicate non-assigned code points

== See also ==
- List of Cyrillic letters
- Cyrillic script
- Cyrillic alphabets
