= Soft Kha =

Soft Kha may refer to:

- Kha with descender
- Kha with hook
- Kha with stroke
