= Mari alphabet =

Alphabet of the Mari language

The Mari language is mostly written using a Cyrillic alphabet.

== Cyrillic script ==
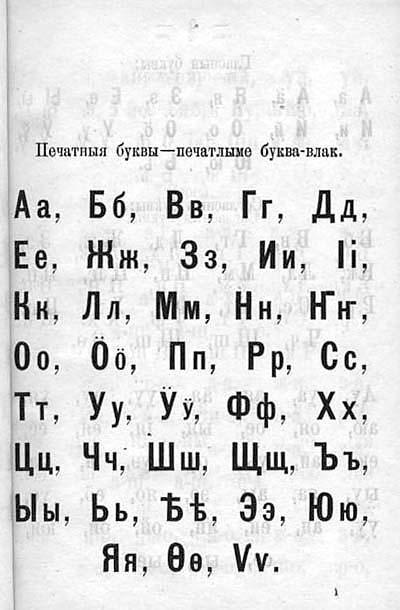
A Mari Cyrillic alphabet in a primer from 1887

=== Meadow Mari alphabet ===
А а	Б б	В в	Г г	Д д	Е е	Ё ё	Ж ж
З з	И и	Й й	К к	Л л	М м	Н н	Ҥ ҥ
О о	Ӧ ӧ	П п	Р р	С с	Т т	У у	Ӱ ӱ
Ф ф	Х х	Ц ц	Ч ч	Ш ш	Щ щ	Ъ ъ	Ы ы
Ь ь	Э э	Ю ю	Я я

The Meadow Mari alphabet uses all of the letters of the Russian alphabet, plus 3 more: ҥ, ӧ, and ӱ. Respectively, these letters represent the phonemes /ŋ/, /œ/, and /y/.

=== Hill Mari alphabet ===
А а	Ӓ ӓ	Б б	В в	Г г	Д д	Е е	Ё ё
Ж ж	З з	И и	Й й	К к	Л л	М м	Н н
О о	Ӧ ӧ	П п	Р р	С с	Т т	У у	Ӱ ӱ
Ф ф	Х х	Ц ц	Ч ч	Ш ш	Щ щ	Ъ ъ	Ы ы
Ӹ ӹ	Ь ь	Э э	Ю ю	Я я

The Hill Mari alphabet uses all of the letters of the Russian alphabet, plus 4 more: ӓ, ӧ, ӱ, and ӹ. Respectively, these letters represent the phonemes /æ/, /œ/, /y/, and /ə̟/.

=== North-Western Mari alphabet ===
А а	Ӓ ӓ	Б б	В в	Г г	Д д	Е е	Ё ё
Ж ж	З з	И и	Й й	К к	Л л	М м	Н н
ҥ	О о	Ӧ ӧ	Ө ө	Ӫ ӫ	П п	Р р	С с
Т т	У у	Ӱ ӱ	Ф ф	Х х	Ц ц	Ч ч	Ш ш
Щ щ	ъ	Ы ы	Ӹ ӹ	ь	Э э	Ю ю	Я я

The North-Western Mari alphabet uses all of the letters of the Russian alphabet, plus 7 more: ӓ, ҥ, ӧ, ө, ӱ, ӫ and ӹ. Respectively, these letters represent the phonemes /æ/, /ŋ/, /œ/, /ů/, /y/, /ẙ/ and /ə/.

== Latin script ==
=== Draft version of the Latin alphabet from 1930 ===
Aa	Ää	Bв	Gg	Dd	Zz	Ƶƶ	Ii
Jj	Kk	Lʟ	Ļʟ̧	Mm	Nn	Ꞑꞑ	Ŋŋ
Oo	Pp	Rr	Ss	Tt	Uu	Üü	Cc
Şş	Çç	Әә	Ӛӛ	Ee	Ff	Hh	Čč
t’	d’
