= Soft El =

Cyrillic letter

Cyrillic letter Soft El
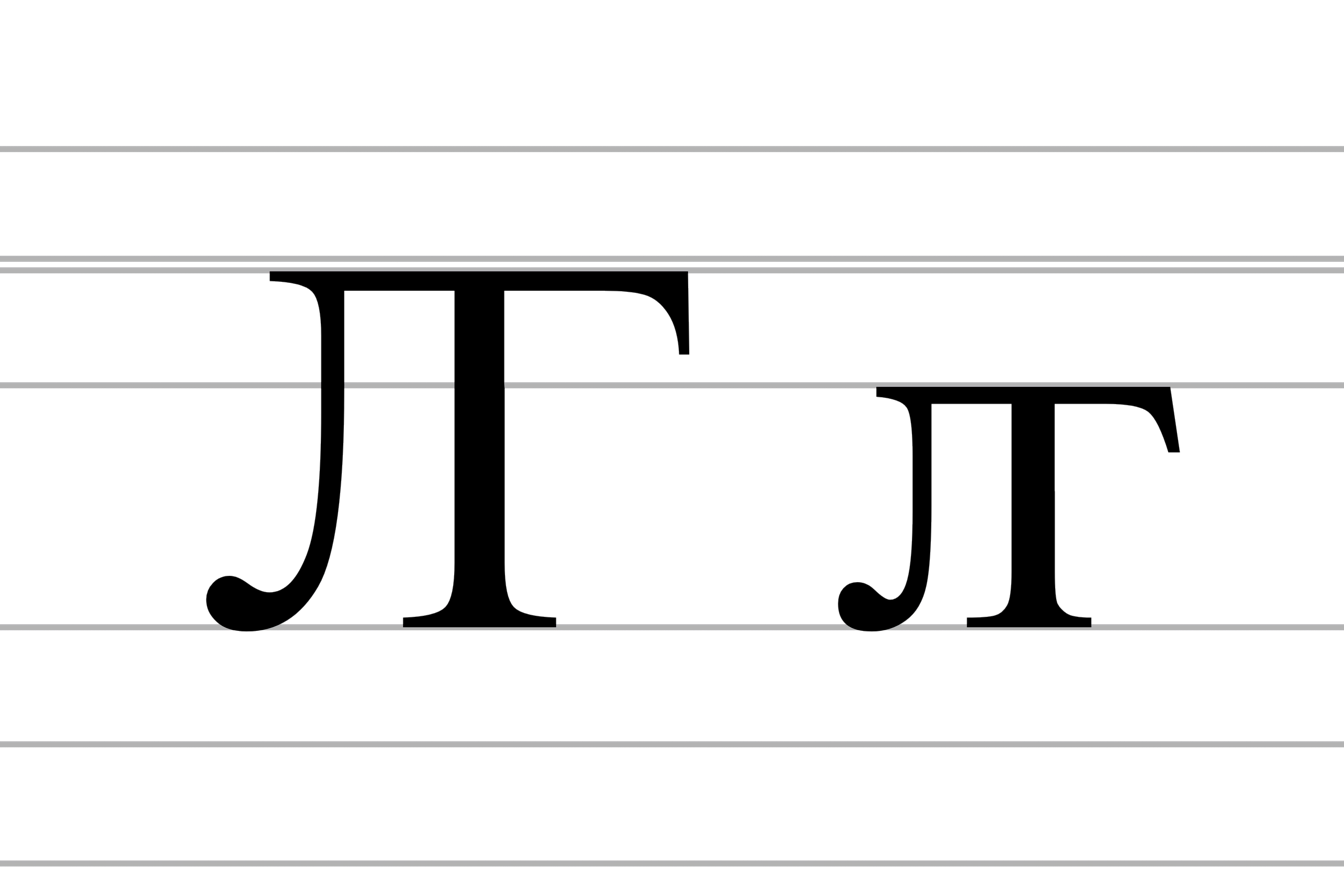

Usage
- Writing system: Cyrillic
- Type: Alphabetic
- Sound values: /lʲ/

Soft El (Ꙥ ꙥ; italics: Ꙥ ꙥ) is a letter of the Cyrillic script.

Soft El has seen rare use in certain Old Church Slavonic editions as a fused form of Л҄, denoting a palatalized Л.

This letter is also used for the Cyrillization of Arabic.

== Computing codes ==
Character information
Preview	Ꙥ		ꙥ	
Unicode name	CYRILLIC CAPITAL LETTER; SOFT EL		CYRILLIC SMALL LETTER; SOFT EL	
Encodings	decimal	hex	dec	hex
Unicode	42596	U+A664	42597	U+A665
UTF-8	234 153 164	EA 99 A4	234 153 165	EA 99 A5
Numeric character reference	&#42596;	&#xA664;	&#42597;	&#xA665;

== See also ==
- Cyrillic characters in Unicode
- Soft De
- Soft Em
- Soft En
