= Tche =

Cyrillic letter

- Ꚓ ꚓ

Usage
- Writing system: Cyrillic
- Type: Alphabetic
- Sound values: /t͡ʃʼ/

Tche (Ꚓ ꚓ; italics: Ꚓ ꚓ) is a letter of the Cyrillic script. The shape of the letter originated as a ligature of the Cyrillic letters Te (Т т Т т) and Che (Ч ч Ч ч).

Tche is used in the old Abkhaz alphabet, where it represents the palato-alveolar ejective affricate /t͡ʃʼ/. It corresponds to Ҷ.

Tche is also used in the old Komi language alphabet.

== Computing codes ==
Character information
Preview	Ꚓ		ꚓ	
Unicode name	CYRILLIC CAPITAL LETTER TCHE		CYRILLIC SMALL LETTER TCHE	
Encodings	decimal	hex	dec	hex
Unicode	42642	U+A692	42643	U+A693
UTF-8	234 154 146	EA 9A 92	234 154 147	EA 9A 93
Numeric character reference	&#42642;	&#xA692;	&#42643;	&#xA693;

== See also ==
- Ҷ ҷ : Cyrillic letter Che with descender
- Ҵ ҵ : Cyrillic letter Te Tse
- Cyrillic characters in Unicode
