= Tswe =

Cyrillic letter Tswe

- Ꚏ ꚏ

Usage
- Writing system: Cyrillic
- Type: Alphabetic
- Sound values: /t͡ɕʷʰ/

Tswe (Ꚏ ꚏ; italics: Ꚏ ꚏ) is a letter of the Cyrillic script. It is drawn by adding a long tail to the bottom of the letter Ц (Ц ц Ц ц).

Tswe is used in an historical orthography of the Abkhaz language, where it represents the labialized aspirated voiceless alveolo-palatal affricate /t͡ɕʷʰ/. It corresponds to Цә. Later, Tswe was used in the Abkhaz and Russian languages.

== Computing codes ==
Character information
Preview	Ꚏ		ꚏ	
Unicode name	CYRILLIC CAPITAL LETTER TSWE		CYRILLIC SMALL LETTER TSWE	
Encodings	decimal	hex	dec	hex
Unicode	42638	U+A68E	42639	U+A68F
UTF-8	234 154 142	EA 9A 8E	234 154 143	EA 9A 8F
Numeric character reference	&#42638;	&#xA68E;	&#42639;	&#xA68F;

== See also ==
- Ц ц : Cyrillic letter Tse
- Ꚗ ꚗ : Cyrillic letter Shwe
- Cyrillic characters in Unicode
