= E with diaeresis =

E with diaeresis may refer to:

- E with diaeresis (Cyrillic) (Ӭ, ӭ) - a Kildin Sami letter
- E with diaeresis (Latin) (Ë, ë) - an Albanian, Kashubian and Piedmontese letter

== See also ==
- Yo (Cyrillic) (Ё, ё)
