= Ze with diaeresis =

Cyrillic letter used in Udmurt

- Ӟ ӟ

Usage
- Writing system: Cyrillic
- Type: Alphabetic
- Sound values: [d͡ʑ], formerly also [ð]

Ze with diaeresis (Ӟ ӟ; italics: Ӟ ӟ) is a letter of the Cyrillic script. It is used only in the Udmurt language, where it represents the voiced alveolo-palatal affricate /d͡ʑ/. It is usually romanized as ⟨đ⟩, but its ISO 9 transliteration is ⟨z̈⟩.

It was also formerly used in the Bashkir language, where it represented the voiced dental fricative /ð/. In this function, the letter has been replaced with dhe (Ҙҙ).

== Computing codes ==
Character information
Preview	Ӟ		ӟ	
Unicode name	CYRILLIC CAPITAL LETTER; ZE WITH DIAERESIS		CYRILLIC SMALL LETTER; ZE WITH DIAERESIS	
Encodings	decimal	hex	dec	hex
Unicode	1246	U+04DE	1247	U+04DF
UTF-8	211 158	D3 9E	211 159	D3 9F
Numeric character reference	&#1246;	&#x4DE;	&#1247;	&#x4DF;

== See also ==
- З з : Cyrillic letter Ze
- Ҙ ҙ : Cyrillic letter Dhe
- З̌ з̌ : Cyrillic letter Ze with caron
- Ђ ђ : Cyrillic letter Dje
- Z̈ z̈ : Latin letter Z with diaeresis
- Cyrillic characters in Unicode
