= Shwe =

Shwe may refer to:

- Shwe language, a variety of the Palaung language
- Shwe, a subgroup of the Palaung people
- Shwe (Cyrillic), a Cyrillic letter
- Than Shwe (b. 1933), Burmese politician
