= Khakassian Che =

Letter of the Cyrillic script

Khakassian che
- Ӌ ӌ

Usage
- Writing system: Cyrillic
- Type: Alphabetic
- Language of origin: Khakas language, Soyot language
- Sound values: /d͡ʒ/

Khakassian Che (Ӌ ӌ; italics: Ӌ ӌ) is a letter of the Cyrillic script. Its form is derived from the Cyrillic letter che (Ч ч Ч ч).

It is used in the alphabet of the Khakas language, as its name suggests, and represents the voiced postalveolar affricate /d͡ʒ/; similar to the pronunciation of ⟨j⟩ in "jump". Khakassian che corresponds in other Cyrillic alphabets to the digraphs ⟨дж⟩ or ⟨чж⟩, or to the letters che with descender (Ҷ ҷ), che with vertical stroke (Ҹ ҹ), dzhe (Џ џ), zhe with breve (Ӂ ӂ), zhe with diaeresis (Ӝ ӝ), or zhe with descender (Җ җ).

It is also used in the Soyot language.

== Computing codes ==
Character information
Preview	Ӌ		ӌ	
Unicode name	CYRILLIC CAPITAL LETTER; KHAKASSIAN CHE		CYRILLIC SMALL LETTER; KHAKASSIAN CHE	
Encodings	decimal	hex	dec	hex
Unicode	1227	U+04CB	1228	U+04CC
UTF-8	211 139	D3 8B	211 140	D3 8C
Numeric character reference	&#1227;	&#x4CB;	&#1228;	&#x4CC;

== See also ==
- Cyrillic characters in Unicode
