= En with tail =

Cyrillic letter used in Kildin Sami

- Ӊ ӊ

Usage
- Writing system: Cyrillic
- Type: Alphabetic
- Sound values: /n̥/

En with tail (Ӊ ӊ; italics: Ӊ ӊ) is a letter of the Cyrillic script. Its form is derived from the Cyrillic letter En (Н н) by adding a tail to the right leg.

En with tail is used only in the alphabet of the Kildin Sami language and Ter Sami language where it represents the voiceless alveolar nasal /n̥/.

== Computing codes ==
Character information
Preview	Ӊ		ӊ	
Unicode name	CYRILLIC CAPITAL LETTER; EN WITH TAIL		CYRILLIC SMALL LETTER; EN WITH TAIL	
Encodings	decimal	hex	dec	hex
Unicode	1225	U+04C9	1226	U+04CA
UTF-8	211 137	D3 89	211 138	D3 8A
Numeric character reference	&#1225;	&#x4C9;	&#1226;	&#x4CA;

== See also ==
- Ң ң : Cyrillic letter En with descender
- Ӈ ӈ : Cyrillic letter En with hook
- Ҥ ҥ : Cyrillic ligature En-Ge
- Ԩ ԩ : Cyrillic letter En with left hook
- Cyrillic characters in Unicode
