= DWE =

DWE may refer to:

- Dwe (1966–2007), Burmese actor and singer
- Dwe (Cyrillic), a letter of the Cyrillic script
- Doppler Wind Experiment, on the Huygens spacecraft
- Dubai Women Establishment
