= Tsse =

Tsse may refer to:

- Tsse (Cyrillic) (Ꚑ ꚑ), a letter of the Cyrillic script
- TssE, a constituent protein in the baseplate of a Type VI secretion system
