= Che with vertical stroke =

Cyrillic letter

- Ҹ ҹ

Usage
- Writing system: Cyrillic
- Type: Alphabetic
- Language of origin: Azerbaijani
- Sound values: /d͡ʒ/, /dʑ/
- In Unicode: U+04B8, U+04B9

Che with vertical stroke (Ҹ ҹ; italics: Ҹ ҹ) is a letter of the Cyrillic script. Its form is derived from the Cyrillic letter Che (Ч ч Ч ч).

Che with vertical stroke is used in the alphabet of the Azerbaijani language, where it represents the voiced postalveolar affricate /d͡ʒ/, like the pronunciation of ⟨j⟩ in "jump". The corresponding letter in the Latin alphabet is ⟨C c⟩.

Che with vertical stroke corresponds in other Cyrillic alphabets to the digraphs ⟨дж⟩ or ⟨чж⟩, or to the letters Che with descender (Ҷ ҷ), Dzhe (Џ џ), Khakassian Che (Ӌ ӌ), Zhe with breve (Ӂ ӂ), Zhe with diaeresis (Ӝ ӝ), or Zhje (Җ җ).

From 1958 until 1991, it was used in the Azerbaijani alphabet to represent /d͡ʒ/; in this alphabet it is found in the name of Azerbaijan: «Азәрбајҹан». ⟨ҹ⟩ and the Azerbaijani Cyrillic alphabet continue to be used by Azerbaijani speakers in Russia, particularly in Dagestan. The letter is also used in the Tat and Judeo-Tat alphabets in Azerbaijan.

== Computing codes ==
Character information
Preview	Ҹ		ҹ	
Unicode name	CYRILLIC CAPITAL LETTER; CHE WITH VERTICAL STROKE		CYRILLIC SMALL LETTER; CHE WITH VERTICAL STROKE	
Encodings	decimal	hex	dec	hex
Unicode	1208	U+04B8	1209	U+04B9
UTF-8	210 184	D2 B8	210 185	D2 B9
Numeric character reference	&#1208;	&#x4B8;	&#1209;	&#x4B9;

== See also ==
- Cyrillic characters in Unicode
