= Er with caron =

Cyrillic letter used in Nivkh

- Р̌ р̌

Usage
- Writing system: Cyrillic
- Type: Alphabetic
- Sound values: /r̥/

Er with caron (Р̌ р̌) is a letter of the Cyrillic script.

Er with caron, or often er with breve (Р̆ р̆), is used in the Nivkh language, where it represents the voiceless alveolar trill /r̥/, sometimes analyzed as /r̥ʃ/.

It was also used in 19th-century Polish Cyrillic, corresponding to the digraph Rz, which used to have the sound value of Czech Ř ř.

== See also ==
- Ř ř : Latin letter R with caron - a Czech, Silesian, and Sorbian letter
- Ҏ ҏ : Cyrillic letter Er with tick
- Ԗ ԗ : Cyrillic letter Rha
- Cyrillic characters in Unicode
