= Zhe with diaeresis =

Cyrillic letter used in Udmurt

- Ӝ ӝ

Usage
- Writing system: Cyrillic
- Type: Alphabetic
- Language of origin: Udmurt
- Sound values: /d͡ʒ/
- In Unicode: U+04DC, U+04DD

Zhe with diaeresis (Ӝ ӝ; italics: Ӝ ӝ) is a letter of the Cyrillic script. Its form is derived from the Cyrillic letter Zhe (Ж ж Ж ж).

Zhe with diaeresis is used only in the alphabet of the Udmurt language, where it represents the voiced postalveolar affricate /d͡ʒ/, like the pronunciation of ⟨j⟩ in "jam". It is usually romanized as ⟨dž⟩.

Zhe with diaeresis corresponds in other Cyrillic alphabets to the digraphs ⟨дж⟩ or ⟨чж⟩, or to the letters Che with descender (Ҷ ҷ), Che with vertical stroke (Ҹ ҹ), Dzhe (Џ џ), Khakassian Che (Ӌ ӌ), Zhe with breve (Ӂ ӂ), or Zhje (Җ җ).

== Computing codes ==
Character information
Preview	Ӝ		ӝ	
Unicode name	CYRILLIC CAPITAL LETTER; ZHE WITH DIAERESIS		CYRILLIC SMALL LETTER; ZHE WITH DIAERESIS	
Encodings	decimal	hex	dec	hex
Unicode	1244	U+04DC	1245	U+04DD
UTF-8	211 156	D3 9C	211 157	D3 9D
Numeric character reference	&#1244;	&#x4DC;	&#1245;	&#x4DD;

== See also ==
- Cyrillic characters in Unicode
