= Dzwe =

Cyrillic letter

- Ꚃ ꚃ

Usage
- Writing system: Cyrillic
- Type: Alphabetic
- Sound values: [d͡ʑʷ]

Dzwe (Ꚃ ꚃ; italics: Ꚃ ꚃ) is a letter of the Cyrillic script. It resembles an intact longer Cyrillic Dze (Ѕ ѕ Ѕ ѕ), but perhaps was derived from the Greek letter ζ.

Dzwe was used in the Abkhaz language where it represented the labialized voiced alveolo-palatal affricate /d͡ʑʷ/. This was replaced by the digraph Ӡә.

== Computing codes ==
Character information
Preview	Ꚃ		ꚃ	
Unicode name	CYRILLIC CAPITAL LETTER DZWE		CYRILLIC SMALL LETTER DZWE	
Encodings	decimal	hex	dec	hex
Unicode	42626	U+A682	42627	U+A683
UTF-8	234 154 130	EA 9A 82	234 154 131	EA 9A 83
Numeric character reference	&#42626;	&#xA682;	&#42627;	&#xA683;

== See also ==
- Ӡ ӡ : Cyrillic letter Abkhazian Dze
- Ѕ ѕ : Cyrillic letter Dze (Macedonian Dze)
- S s : Latin letter S
- ſ : Long S
- Ꞅ ꞅ : Latin letter Insular S
- Cyrillic characters in Unicode
