= HWE =

Hwe or HWE may refer to:

- Hwe (Cyrillic), a letter of the Cyrillic script
- Hwe language, spoken in Ghana, Togo, and Benin
- Hardy–Weinberg equilibrium
- Henry Walker Eltin
- Home War Establishment of the Royal Canadian Air Force
- Horner–Wadsworth–Emmons reaction
- Hostile work environment, a term of art in United States labor law
- Hot water extraction, a carpet-cleaning technique
- Sunwoo Hwe, South Korean writer
- Hardware Enablement, a Linux kernel issue in between stable kernel versions to catch up with newest hardware technologies; opposed by General Availability (GA)

== See also ==
- Hoe (food) (pronounced hwe), a Korean dish
