= Abkhazian Che =

Cyrillic letter

- Ҽ ҽ
- Ꚇ ꚇ

Usage
- Writing system: Cyrillic
- Type: Alphabetic
- Sound values: /ʈʂ/

History
- Development: Ҽ ҽ
- Variations: Ꚇ ꚇ

Abkhazian Che (Ҽ ҽ; italics: Ҽ ҽ) is a letter of the Cyrillic script.

Abkhazian Che is used in the alphabet of the Abkhaz language, where it represents the voiceless retroflex affricate /ʈʂ/. In the alphabet, it is placed between ⟨Ҷ⟩ and ⟨Ҿ⟩.

== Resemblance ==
The letter only coincidentally resembles a lowercase Latin letter e. Historically, it is the cursive form of the corresponding letter in the Abkhazian Latin alphabet, where it somewhat resembled a Greek φ.

== Cche ==
An alternative form of Abkhazian che, termed cche by Unicode.

Cche or Double Che (Ꚇ ꚇ; italics: Ꚇ ꚇ) was a letter of the Cyrillic script. It was used in the old Abkhaz alphabets, where it represented the voiceless retroflex affricate /ʈ͡ʂ/. The letter was invented by baron Peter von Uslar. In 1862 he published his linguistic study "Абхазский язык". The letter was Ҽ-shaped but in 1887 Uslar's study was reprinted by M. Zavadskiy who changed its shape and the result resembled a Cyrillic Ч doubled. Later the letter returned to its initial form which, created by linguist Uslar, is now part of the modern Abkhaz alphabet, which is now depicted as Ҽ.

== Computing codes ==
Character information
Preview	Ҽ		ҽ		Ꚇ		ꚇ	
Unicode name	CYRILLIC CAPITAL LETTER; ABKHASIAN CHE		CYRILLIC SMALL LETTER; ABKHASIAN CHE		CYRILLIC CAPITAL LETTER CCHE		CYRILLIC SMALL LETTER CCHE	
Encodings	decimal	hex	dec	hex	dec	hex	dec	hex
Unicode	1212	U+04BC	1213	U+04BD	42630	U+A686	42631	U+A687
UTF-8	210 188	D2 BC	210 189	D2 BD	234 154 134	EA 9A 86	234 154 135	EA 9A 87
Numeric character reference	&#1212;	&#x4BC;	&#1213;	&#x4BD;	&#42630;	&#xA686;	&#42631;	&#xA687;

== Related characters and other similar characters ==
- Պ պ : Armenian letter Pe
- ɰ : Voiced velar approximant

== See also ==
- Cyrillic characters in Unicode
- Abkhazian Che with descender
