= El with hook =

Cyrillic letter used for /ɬ/ in Chukchi

- Ԓ ԓ

Usage
- Writing system: Cyrillic
- Type: Alphabetic
- Sound values: [ɬ]

El with hook (Ԓ ԓ; italics: Ԓ ԓ) is a letter of the Cyrillic script. Its form is derived from the Cyrillic letter El (Л л) by adding a hook to the bottom of the right leg.

It is used in Chukchi and, in some publications, in Itelmen and Khanty. In all three of these languages, it represents the voiceless alveolar lateral fricative /ɬ/, like the pronunciation of ⟨ll⟩ in the Welsh language.

El with hook was officially added to the Chukchi alphabet in the late 1980s. The letter was first used in a Chukchi language primer that was published in 1996 (Ԓыгъоравэтԓьэн йиԓыйиԓ), replacing the Cyrillic letter El ⟨Л⟩ to reduce confusion with the different pronunciation of the Russian letter of the same form.

El with hook is the nineteenth letter of Itelmen, introduced with the new Cyrillic alphabet during 1984–1988. In some publications, it is substituted by El with descender (Ԯ ԯ).

El with hook has been in use in Khanty since 1990. El with hook and El with descender are considered variants of the same letter in Khanty; their use depends on the particular publisher.

== Computing codes ==
Character information
Preview	Ԓ		ԓ	
Unicode name	CYRILLIC CAPITAL LETTER; EL WITH HOOK		CYRILLIC SMALL LETTER; EL WITH HOOK	
Encodings	decimal	hex	dec	hex
Unicode	1298	U+0512	1299	U+0513
UTF-8	212 146	D4 92	212 147	D4 93
Numeric character reference	&#1298;	&#x512;	&#1299;	&#x513;

== Variant forms ==
Original form of the letter, 1980s, Soviet Schoolbook (Shkolnaya) typeface

Handwritten form

Two variants of the letter (Noto fonts и GNU FreeFont typefaces)

Two variants of the letter (typefaces in Windows)

The letter has two variant forms: the original one where the hook is like a small comma, and the other where the hook is notably protruded below the baseline.

== See also ==
- Ԯ ԯ : Cyrillic letter El with descender
- Ӆ ӆ : Cyrillic letter El with tail
- Ԡ ԡ : Cyrillic letter El with middle hook
- Cyrillic characters in Unicode
