= Tsse (Cyrillic) =

Cyrillic letter

- Ꚑ ꚑ

Usage
- Writing system: Cyrillic
- Type: Alphabetic
- Sound values: /t͡ɕʷʼ/

Tsse (Ꚑ ꚑ; italics: Ꚑ ꚑ) is a letter of the Cyrillic script. The shape of the letter originated as a ligature of the Cyrillic letters Te (Т т Т т) and Es (С с С с). Its form resembles a T with an ogonek attached on its bottom.

Tsse was used in the Abkhaz language, where it represented the labialized alveolo-palatal ejective affricate /t͡ɕʷʼ/. It is a Cyrillic letter corresponding to Ҵә.

== Computing codes ==
Character information
Preview	Ꚑ		ꚑ	
Unicode name	CYRILLIC CAPITAL LETTER TSSE		CYRILLIC SMALL LETTER TSSE	
Encodings	decimal	hex	dec	hex
Unicode	42640	U+A690	42641	U+A691
UTF-8	234 154 144	EA 9A 90	234 154 145	EA 9A 91
Numeric character reference	&#42640;	&#xA690;	&#42641;	&#xA691;

== See also ==
- Ҵ ҵ : Cyrillic letter Te Tse
- Cyrillic characters in Unicode
