= El with middle hook =

Cyrillic letter

- Ԡ ԡ

Usage
- Writing system: Cyrillic
- Type: Alphabetic
- Language of origin: Abkhaz, Chuvash
- Sound values: /lʲ/
- In Unicode: U+0520

El with middle hook (Ԡ ԡ; italics: Ԡ ԡ) is a letter of the Cyrillic script. Its form is derived from the Cyrillic letter El (Л л) by adding a hook to the middle of the right leg.

El with middle hook was only used in the Abkhaz and Chuvash languages.

In Chuvash it was used for the palatalized alveolar lateral approximant /lʲ/, and corresponds in other Chuvash orthographies to el with grave (Л̀ л̀).

== Computing codes ==
Character information
Preview	Ԡ		ԡ	
Unicode name	CYRILLIC CAPITAL LETTER; EL WITH MIDDLE HOOK		CYRILLIC SMALL LETTER; EL WITH MIDDLE HOOK	
Encodings	decimal	hex	dec	hex
Unicode	1312	U+0520	1313	U+0521
UTF-8	212 160	D4 A0	212 161	D4 A1
Numeric character reference	&#1312;	&#x520;	&#1313;	&#x521;

== See also ==
- Ԯ ԯ : Cyrillic letter El with descender
- Ӆ ӆ : Cyrillic letter El with tail
- Ԓ ԓ : Cyrillic letter El with hook
- Љ љ : Cyrillic letter Lje
- Cyrillic characters in Unicode
