= Lha (Cyrillic) =

Letter of the Cyrillic script

- Ԕ ԕ

Usage
- Writing system: Cyrillic
- Type: Alphabetic
- Sound values: /l̥/

Lha (Ԕ ԕ; italics: Ԕ ԕ) is a letter of the Cyrillic script. It is a cross-digraph of the Cyrillic letters El (Л л) and Kha (Х х).

Lha was used in the alphabet used in the 1920s for the Moksha language, where it represented the voiceless alveolar lateral approximant /l̥/.

== Computer encoding ==
Character information
Preview	Ԕ		ԕ	
Unicode name	CYRILLIC CAPITAL LETTER LHA		CYRILLIC SMALL LETTER LHA	
Encodings	decimal	hex	dec	hex
Unicode	1300	U+0514	1301	U+0515
UTF-8	212 148	D4 94	212 149	D4 95
Numeric character reference	&#1300;	&#x514;	&#1301;	&#x515;

== See also ==
- Cyrillic characters in Unicode
- Љ љ : Cyrillic letter Lje, a Serbian, Macedonian, and Montenegrin letter.
- Ԉ ԉ : Cyrillic letter Komi Lje
- Л л : Cyrillic letter El
- ℒ ℓ : Latin letter Script L
