= El with tail =

Cyrillic letter used for /ɬ/ in Kildin Sami

- Ӆ ӆ

Usage
- Writing system: Cyrillic
- Type: Alphabetic
- Language of origin: Kildin Sámi
- Sound values: /ɬ/
- In Unicode: U+04C5

El with tail (Ӆ ӆ; italics: Ӆ ӆ) is a letter of the Cyrillic script. Its form is derived from the Cyrillic letter el (Л л) by adding a tail to the right leg.

El with tail is used in the alphabet of the Kildin Sami language and Ter Sami language, where it is located between ⟨Л⟩ and ⟨М⟩. This letter represents the voiceless alveolar lateral fricative /ɬ/, like the pronunciation of ⟨ll⟩ in the Welsh language.

In the Khanty language, it is sometimes used as a substitute for Ԯ, while in the Itelmen language, it is sometimes used as a substitute for Ԓ, in both cases also to represent /ɬ/.

== Computing codes ==
Character information
Preview	Ӆ		ӆ	
Unicode name	CYRILLIC CAPITAL LETTER; EL WITH TAIL		CYRILLIC SMALL LETTER; EL WITH TAIL	
Encodings	decimal	hex	dec	hex
Unicode	1221	U+04C5	1222	U+04C6
UTF-8	211 133	D3 85	211 134	D3 86
Numeric character reference	&#1221;	&#x4C5;	&#1222;	&#x4C6;

== See also ==
- Ԯ ԯ : Cyrillic letter El with descender
- Ԓ ԓ : Cyrillic letter El with hook
- Ԡ ԡ : Cyrillic letter El with middle hook
- Cyrillic characters in Unicode
