= Dche =

Cyrillic letter

- Ԭ ԭ

Usage
- Writing system: Cyrillic
- Type: Alphabetic
- Language of origin: Komi
- Sound values: [d͡ʑ]
- In Unicode: U+052C, U+052D

Dche (Ԭ ԭ; italics: Ԭ ԭ) is a letter of the Cyrillic script. The shape of the letter originated as a ligature of the Cyrillic letters De (Д д; Д д) and Che (Ч ч; Ч ч).

Dche was used in an old orthography of the Komi language.

== Usage ==
This letter represents the voiced alveolo-palatal affricate /d͡ʑ/. It can be romanized as ⟨đ⟩.

It was used chiefly in northeastern European Russia by the Komi language of the Komi peoples. It is equivalent to the digraph Дз дз today.

== Computing codes ==
Character information
Preview	Ԭ		ԭ	
Unicode name	CYRILLIC CAPITAL LETTER; DCHE		CYRILLIC SMALL LETTER; DCHE	
Encodings	decimal	hex	dec	hex
Unicode	1324	U+052C	1325	U+052D
UTF-8	212 172	D4 AC	212 173	D4 AD
Numeric character reference	&#1324;	&#x52C;	&#1325;	&#x52D;

== See also ==
- Cyrillic characters in Unicode
- Komi language
- Ђ ђ: Cyrillic letter Dje
- Ԇ ԇ: Cyrillic letter Komi Dzje
