= Twe =

Cyrillic letter

- Ꚍ ꚍ

Usage
- Writing system: Cyrillic
- Type: Alphabetic
- Sound values: /tʷ/

History
- Development: Τ τ: Ꚍ ꚍ
- Sisters: T t, Т т

Twe (Ꚍ ꚍ; italics: Ꚍ ꚍ) is a letter of the Cyrillic script. Its glyph is derived from a lowercase Greek Tau.

Twe was used in old Abkhaz and in old Ossetian.

== Usage ==
In Abkhaz, it represents the labialized voiceless alveolar plosive /tʷ/, like the pronunciation of ⟨tw⟩ in "twin". It corresponds to the digraph Тә in Cyrillic.

== Computing codes ==
Character information
Preview	Ꚍ		ꚍ	
Unicode name	CYRILLIC CAPITAL LETTER TWE		CYRILLIC SMALL LETTER TWE	
Encodings	decimal	hex	dec	hex
Unicode	42636	U+A68C	42637	U+A68D
UTF-8	234 154 140	EA 9A 8C	234 154 141	EA 9A 8D
Numeric character reference	&#42636;	&#xA68C;	&#42637;	&#xA68D;

== See also ==
- Т т : Cyrillic letter Te
- Ʈ ʈ : Latin letter T with retroflex hook
- Cyrillic characters in Unicode
