= Er with tick =

Cyrillic letter used in Kildin Sami

- Ҏ ҏ

Usage
- Writing system: Cyrillic
- Type: Alphabetic
- Language of origin: Kildin Sámi
- Sound values: /r̥/
- In Unicode: U+048E

History
Development
D1
    - Ρ ρ
      - Р р
        - Ҏ ҏ

Er with tick (Ҏ ҏ; italics: Ҏ ҏ) is a letter of the Cyrillic script. Its form is derived from the Cyrillic letter Er (Р р) by adding a tick to the bowl of the letter.

Er with tick is used in the alphabet of the Kildin Sami language and Ter Sami language, where it represents the voiceless alveolar trill /r̥/ (like the Welsh rh).

== Computing codes ==
Character information
Preview	Ҏ		ҏ	
Unicode name	CYRILLIC CAPITAL LETTER; ER WITH TICK		CYRILLIC SMALL LETTER; ER WITH TICK	
Encodings	decimal	hex	dec	hex
Unicode	1166	U+048E	1167	U+048F
UTF-8	210 142	D2 8E	210 143	D2 8F
Numeric character reference	&#1166;	&#x48E;	&#1167;	&#x48F;

== See also ==
- Р̌ р̌ : Cyrillic letter Er with caron
- Ԗ ԗ : Cyrillic letter Rha
- Rr : Spanish double R
- Cyrillic characters in Unicode
