= Yae (Cyrillic) =

Archaic letter of the Cyrillic script

- Ԙ ԙ

Usage
- Writing system: Cyrillic
- Type: Alphabetic
- Sound values: [jæ]

History
- Development: Я and E: Ԙ ԙ

Yae or Yæ (Ԙ ԙ; italics: Ԙ ԙ) is an archaic letter of the Cyrillic script, a ligature of Я (Ya) and Е (E); я and е.

Yae was used in the old alphabet of the Mordvinic languages, where it represented the sequence [jæ], like the pronunciation of ⟨ya⟩ in "yak".

== Computing codes ==
Character information
| Preview | Ԙ | | ԙ | |
|---|---|---|---|---|
| Unicode name | CYRILLIC CAPITAL LETTER YAE | | CYRILLIC SMALL LETTER YAE | |
| Encodings | decimal | hex | dec | hex |
| Unicode | 1304 | U+0518 | 1305 | U+0519 |
| UTF-8 | 212 152 | D4 98 | 212 153 | D4 99 |
| Numeric character reference | &#1304; | &#x518; | &#1305; | &#x519; |

== See also ==
- Cyrillic characters in Unicode
