= El with descender =

Cyrillic letter used for /ɬ/ in Khanty

- Ԯ ԯ

Usage
- Writing system: Cyrillic
- Type: Alphabetic
- Language of origin: Khanty
- Sound values: /ɬ/
- In Unicode: U+052E, U+052F

El with descender (Ԯ ԯ; italics: Ԯ ԯ) is a letter of the Cyrillic script.

El with descender is used in the Khanty language, where it represents the voiceless alveolar lateral fricative /ɬ/.

In Itelmen, El with descender (Ԯ ԯ) is used in some publications instead of El with hook, the nineteenth letter of the Itelmen alphabet, introduced with the new Cyrillic alphabet during 1984–1988. These letters also represent /ɬ/.

Up to the release of Ԯ in Unicode 7.0, the letters Ӆ or Ԓ have been used as an alternative to Ԯ (like Latin letter N with descender, Ꞑ ꞑ).

== Computing codes ==
Character information
Preview	Ԯ		ԯ	
Unicode name	CYRILLIC CAPITAL LETTER; EL WITH DESCENDER		CYRILLIC SMALL LETTER; EL WITH DESCENDER	
Encodings	decimal	hex	dec	hex
Unicode	1326	U+052E	1327	U+052F
UTF-8	212 174	D4 AE	212 175	D4 AF
Numeric character reference	&#1326;	&#x52E;	&#1327;	&#x52F;

== See also ==
- Ӆ ӆ : Cyrillic letter El with tail
- Ԓ ԓ : Cyrillic letter El with hook
- Ԡ ԡ : Cyrillic letter El with middle hook
- Cyrillic characters in Unicode
