= Kha with hook =

Cyrillic letter

- Ӽ ӽ

Usage
- Writing system: Cyrillic
- Type: Alphabetic
- Sound values: /χ/, /ɣ/

Kha with hook (Ӽ ӽ; italics: Ӽ ӽ) is a letter of the Cyrillic script. In Unicode, this letter is called "Ha with hook". Its form is derived from the Cyrillic Kha (Х х Х х) by adding a hook to the right leg.

Kha with hook is used in the alphabets of the Itelmen and Nivkh languages, where it represents the voiceless uvular fricative /χ/, like the Scottish ch in loch, but harder. Kha with hook is also used in the Aleut language (Bering dialect). It is the thirty-ninth letter of the modern Aleut alphabet. In Eastern Khanty's Vakh-Vasyugan dialect it represents the /ɣ/ sound.

The letter Kha with descender (Ҳ ҳ Ҳ ҳ) is sometimes used for this sound instead because of letter font support.

== Computing codes ==
Character information
Preview	Ӽ		ӽ	
Unicode name	CYRILLIC CAPITAL LETTER; HA WITH HOOK		CYRILLIC SMALL LETTER; HA WITH HOOK	
Encodings	decimal	hex	dec	hex
Unicode	1276	U+04FC	1277	U+04FD
UTF-8	211 188	D3 BC	211 189	D3 BD
Numeric character reference	&#1276;	&#x4FC;	&#1277;	&#x4FD;

== See also ==
- Ꜧ ꜧ : Latin letter H with hook
- Cyrillic characters in Unicode
