= Rha (Cyrillic) =

Cyrillic letter

- Ԗ ԗ

Usage
- Writing system: Cyrillic
- Type: Alphabetic
- Sound values: /r̥/
- In Unicode: U+0516, U+0517

Rha (Ԗ ԗ; italics: Ԗ ԗ) is a letter of the Cyrillic script. It looks like a cross-digraph of the Cyrillic letters Er (Р р) and Kha (Х х), but it is not a composable ligature.

Rha was used in the alphabet used in the 1920s for the Moksha language, where it represented the voiceless alveolar trill /r̥/, like the rh in Welsh.

Character information
Preview	Ԗ		ԗ	
Unicode name	CYRILLIC CAPITAL LETTER RHA		CYRILLIC SMALL LETTER RHA	
Encodings	decimal	hex	dec	hex
Unicode	1302	U+0516	1303	U+0517
UTF-8	212 150	D4 96	212 151	D4 97
Numeric character reference	&#1302;	&#x516;	&#1303;	&#x517;

== See also ==
- Р̌ р̌ : Cyrillic letter Er with caron
- Ҏ ҏ : Cyrillic letter Er with tick
- Cyrillic characters in Unicode
