= Zhwe =

Cyrillic letter

- Ꚅ ꚅ

Usage
- Writing system: Cyrillic
- Type: Alphabetic
- Sound values: [ʒʷ]

Zhwe (Ꚅ ꚅ; italics: Ꚅ ꚅ) is a letter of the Cyrillic script. The shape of the letter originated as a ligature of the Cyrillic letters Ze (З з; З з) and Zhe (Ж ж; Ж ж).

Zhwe was used in the Abkhaz language where it represented the labialized voiced palato-alveolar sibilant /ʒʷ/. This was replaced by the digraph Жә. There is also a letter called Zhwe with breve. (Ꚅ꙼ ꚅ꙼ italics Ꚅ꙼ ꚅ꙼) This letter was also in the old Abkhaz language, representing the Voiced alveolo-palatal fricative. This was replaced by the digraph Жь.

== Computing codes ==
Character information
Preview	Ꚅ		ꚅ	
Unicode name	CYRILLIC CAPITAL LETTER ZHWE		CYRILLIC SMALL LETTER ZHWE	
Encodings	decimal	hex	dec	hex
Unicode	42628	U+A684	42629	U+A685
UTF-8	234 154 132	EA 9A 84	234 154 133	EA 9A 85
Numeric character reference	&#42628;	&#xA684;	&#42629;	&#xA685;

== See also ==
- Ж ж : Cyrillic letter Zhe
- З з : Cyrillic letter Ze
- Cyrillic characters in Unicode
