= Dzze =

Cyrillic letter

- Ꚉ ꚉ

Usage
- Writing system: Cyrillic
- Type: Alphabetic
- Language of origin: Abkhaz, Ossetian, Komi
- Sound values: [d͡ʑ]

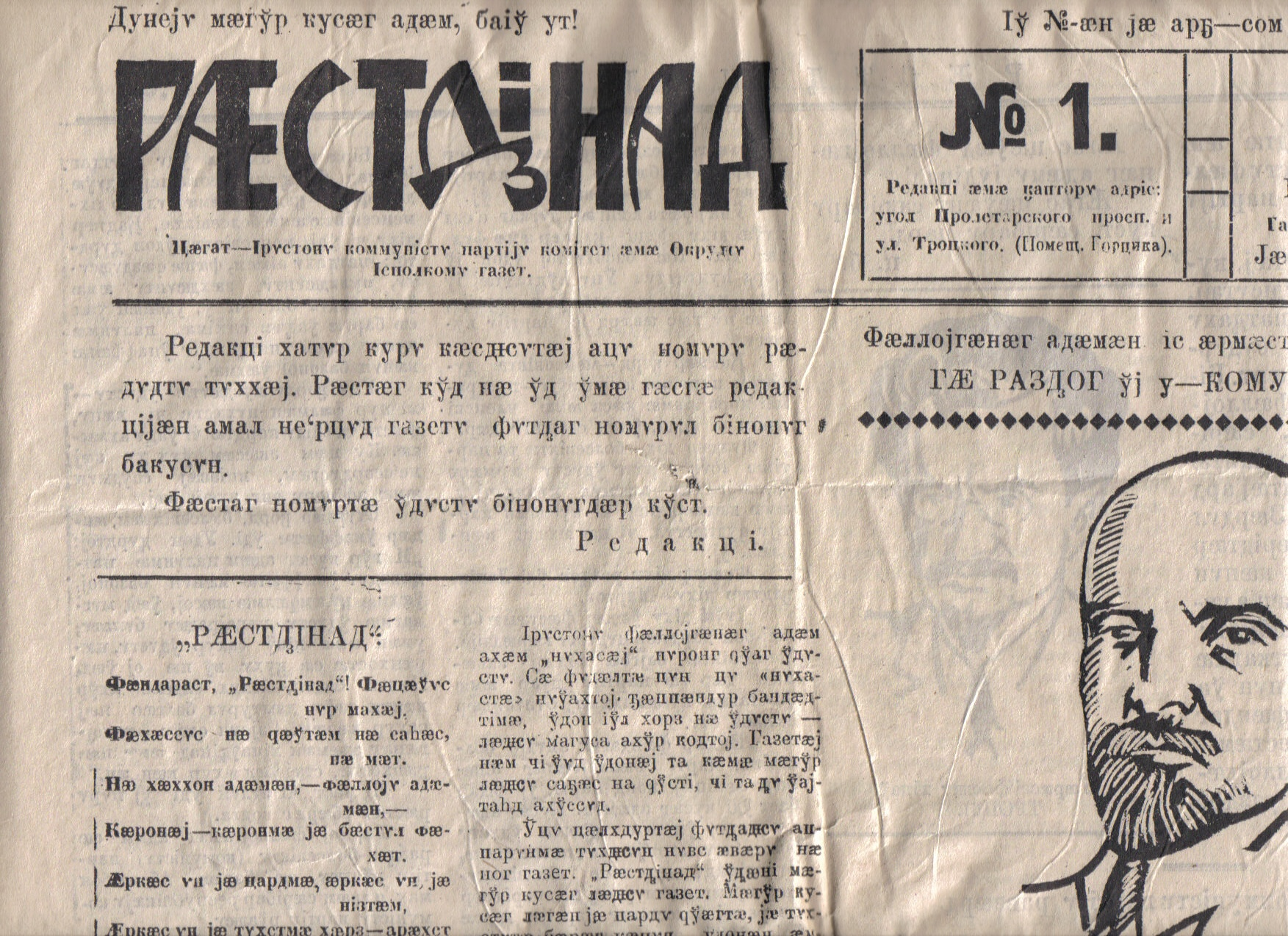
The nameplate of the first edition of Ossetian newspaper Rastdzinad (Растджинад) with the letter Dzze in the title.

Dzze, in a late 19th century Komi alphabet

Dzze (Ꚉ ꚉ; italics: Ꚉ ꚉ) is a letter of the old Abkhaz, Ossetic and Komi alphabets. It represents the voiced alveolo-palatal affricate [d͡ʑ]. It resembles the letter De with a tail of a small Ze.

In Ossetian, it was later replaced with digraph Dz (currently Дз).

It is used to distinguish the affricate /d͜z/ from the sequence d-z in some phonetic dictionaries.

== Computing codes ==
Character information
Preview	Ꚉ		ꚉ	
Unicode name	CYRILLIC CAPITAL LETTER DZZE		CYRILLIC SMALL LETTER DZZE	
Encodings	decimal	hex	dec	hex
Unicode	42632	U+A688	42633	U+A689
UTF-8	234 154 136	EA 9A 88	234 154 137	EA 9A 89
Numeric character reference	&#42632;	&#xA688;	&#42633;	&#xA689;

== See also ==
- Cyrillic characters in Unicode
