= Hwe (Cyrillic) =

Cyrillic letter

- Ꚕ ꚕ

Usage
- Writing system: Cyrillic
- Type: Alphabetic
- Language of origin: Abkhaz language
- Sound values: /ħʷ/

Hwe (Ꚕ ꚕ; italics: Ꚕ ꚕ) is a letter of the Cyrillic script. Its form was derived from the Cyrillic letter Shha (Һ һ Һ һ) by adding a hook to the top of the left leg.

Hwe is used in the old Abkhaz alphabet, where it represents the labialized voiceless pharyngeal fricative /ħʷ/. It corresponds to Ҳә. Its appearance is similar to the letter հ (ho) used in the Armenian script, but the difference between հ and ꚕ is that հ represents /h/ and ꚕ represents /ħʷ/.

== Computing codes ==
Character information
Preview	Ꚕ		ꚕ	
Unicode name	CYRILLIC CAPITAL LETTER HWE		CYRILLIC SMALL LETTER HWE	
Encodings	decimal	hex	dec	hex
Unicode	42644	U+A694	42645	U+A695
UTF-8	234 154 148	EA 9A 94	234 154 149	EA 9A 95
Numeric character reference	&#42644;	&#xA694;	&#42645;	&#xA695;

== See also ==
- Ҳ ҳ : Cyrillic letter Kha with descender
- Ɦ ɦ : Latin letter H with hook
- Cyrillic characters in Unicode
- Ᏺ ᏺ : Cherokee letter Yo
- ɦ : Voiced glottal fricative
