= Komi Dzje =

Letter of the Cyrillic script

- Ԇ ԇ

Usage
- Writing system: Cyrillic
- Type: Alphabetic
- Sound values: [d͡ʑ]

Komi Dzje (Ԇ ԇ; italics: Ԇ ԇ) is a letter of the Molodtsov alphabet, a variant of Cyrillic used in the writing of the Komi language in the 1920s. It is derived from the Cyrillic letter З.

The pronunciation of the letter in Komi is the voiced alveolo-palatal affricate [d͡ʑ], like the pronunciation of Serbo-Croatian đ.

== Computing codes ==
Character information
Preview	Ԇ		ԇ	
Unicode name	CYRILLIC CAPITAL LETTER; KOMI DZJE		CYRILLIC SMALL LETTER; KOMI DZJE	
Encodings	decimal	hex	dec	hex
Unicode	1286	U+0506	1287	U+0507
UTF-8	212 134	D4 86	212 135	D4 87
Numeric character reference	&#1286;	&#x506;	&#1287;	&#x507;

== See also ==
- Cyrillic characters in Unicode
- Ђ ђ: Cyrillic letter Dje
- Ԭ ԭ: Cyrillic letter Dche
