= Soft De =

Cyrillic letter

- Ꙣ ꙣ
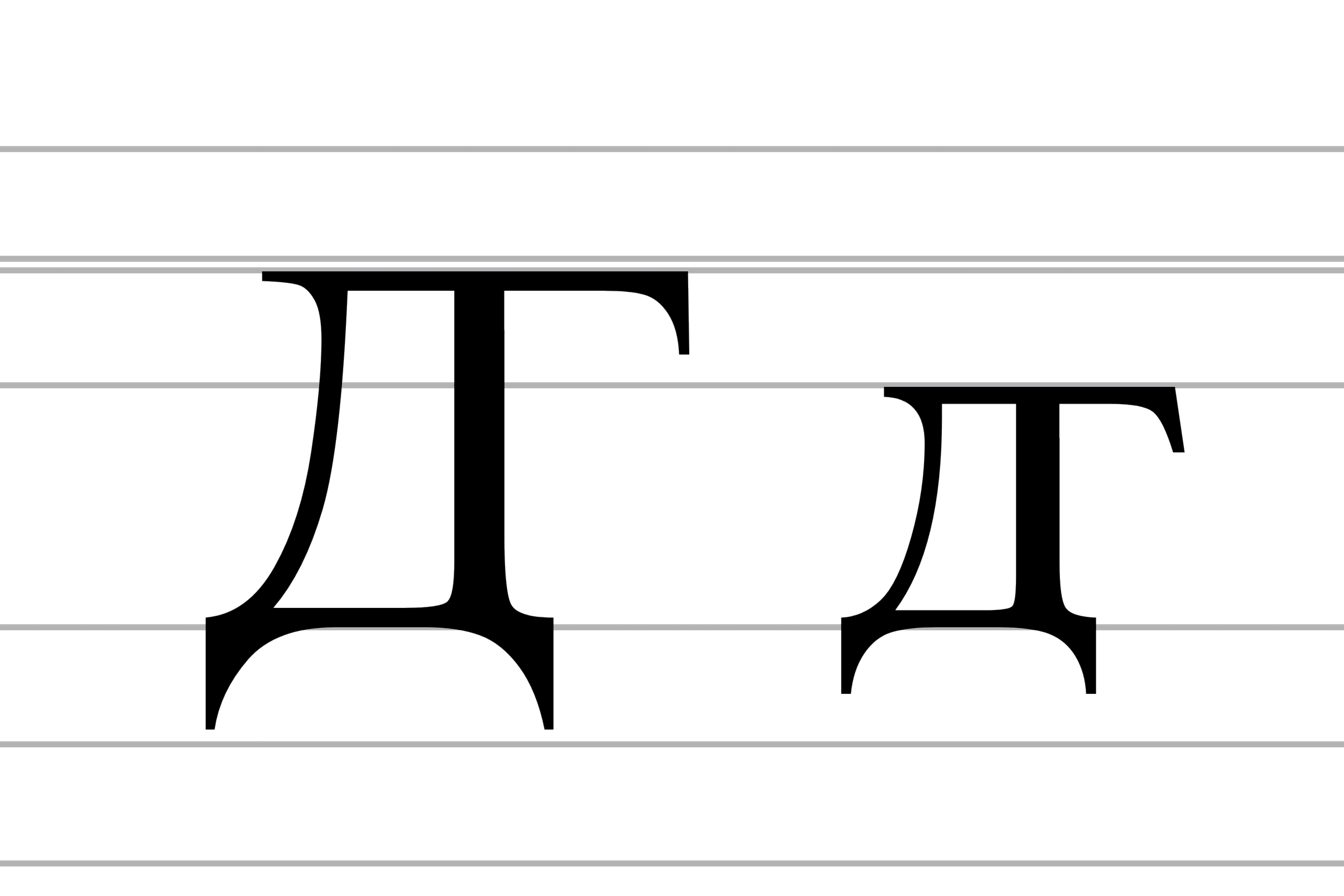

Usage
- Writing system: Cyrillic
- Type: Alphabetic
- Language of origin: Old Church Slavonic
- Sound values: [dʲ]

History
- Development: Д҄: Ꙣ ꙣ

Soft De (Ꙣ ꙣ; italics: Ꙣ ꙣ) is a letter of the Cyrillic script.

Soft De has seen rare use in certain Old Church Slavonic editions as a fused form of Д҄, denoting a palatalized Д.

== Computing codes ==
Character information
Preview	Ꙣ		ꙣ	
Unicode name	CYRILLIC CAPITAL LETTER; SOFT DE		CYRILLIC SMALL LETTER; SOFT DE	
Encodings	decimal	hex	dec	hex
Unicode	42594	U+A662	42595	U+A663
UTF-8	234 153 162	EA 99 A2	234 153 163	EA 99 A3
Numeric character reference	&#42594;	&#xA662;	&#42595;	&#xA663;

== See also ==
- Cyrillic characters in Unicode
- Cyrillization of Arabic
