= Kha with stroke =

Cyrillic letter

- Ӿ ӿ

Usage
- Writing system: Cyrillic
- Type: Alphabetic
- Sound values: /h/

Kha with stroke (Ӿ ӿ; italics: Ӿ ӿ) is a letter of the Cyrillic script. In Unicode, this letter is called "Ha with stroke". Its form is derived from the Cyrillic letter Kha (Х х Х х).

Kha with stroke is only used in the alphabet of the Nivkh language, where it represents the voiceless glottal approximant /h/, like the pronunciation of ⟨h⟩ in "hat".

== Computing codes ==
Character information
| Preview | Ӿ | | ӿ | |
|---|---|---|---|---|
| Unicode name | CYRILLIC CAPITAL LETTER; HA WITH STROKE | | CYRILLIC SMALL LETTER; HA WITH STROKE | |
| Encodings | decimal | hex | dec | hex |
| Unicode | 1278 | U+04FE | 1279 | U+04FF |
| UTF-8 | 211 190 | D3 BE | 211 191 | D3 BF |
| Numeric character reference | &#1278; | &#x4FE; | &#1279; | &#x4FF; |

== See also ==
- Һ һ : Cyrillic letter Shha
- Cyrillic characters in Unicode
- Х х : Cyrillic letter Kha
