= Soft Em =

Cyrillic letter

soft em
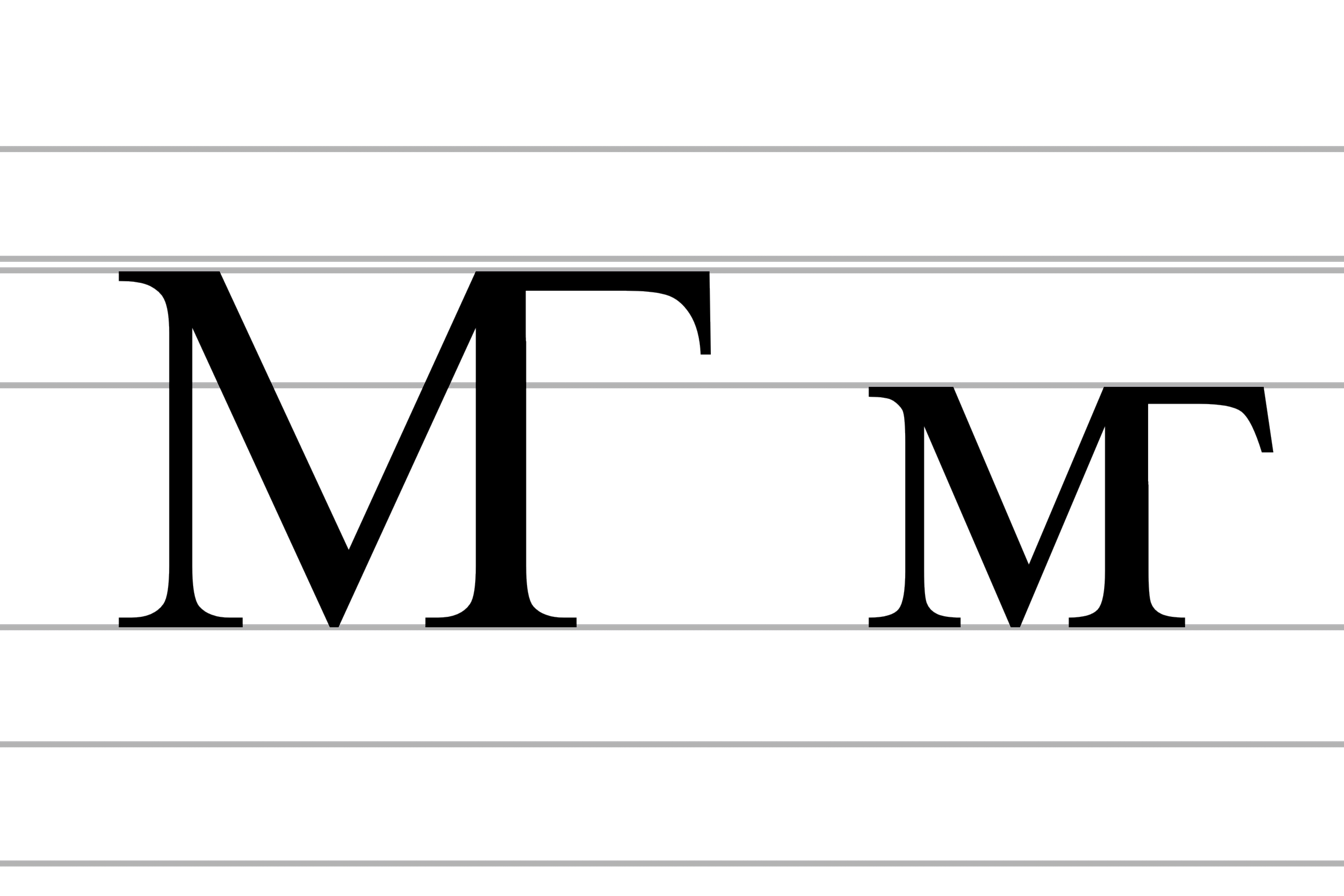

Usage
- Writing system: Cyrillic
- Type: Alphabetic
- Language of origin: Old Church Slavonic
- Sound values: [mʲ]
- In Unicode: U+A666, U+A667

Soft Em (Ꙧ ꙧ; italics: Ꙧ ꙧ ) is a letter of the Cyrillic script. Soft Em has seen rare use in certain Old Church Slavonic editions as a fused form of М҄, denoting a palatalized М.

The font DejaVu has the glyph in Cyrillic Extended-B.

== Computing codes ==
Character information
| Preview | Ꙧ | | ꙧ | |
|---|---|---|---|---|
| Unicode name | CYRILLIC CAPITAL LETTER; SOFT EM | | CYRILLIC SMALL LETTER; SOFT EM | |
| Encodings | decimal | hex | dec | hex |
| Unicode | 42598 | U+A666 | 42599 | U+A667 |
| UTF-8 | 234 153 166 | EA 99 A6 | 234 153 167 | EA 99 A7 |
| Numeric character reference | &#42598; | &#xA666; | &#42599; | &#xA667; |

== See also ==
- Cyrillic characters in Unicode
