= O-hook =

Cyrillic letter

- Ҩ ҩ

Usage
- Writing system: Cyrillic
- Type: Alphabetic
- Language of origin: Abkhaz
- Sound values: [ɥ~ɥˤ]

History
- Development: ھ: Ҩ ҩ

O-hook (Ҩ ҩ; italics: Ҩ ҩ) is a letter of the Cyrillic script. It is derived from the initial form of the Arabic letter hāʾ, ⟨هـ⟩. Its form bears some similarities to the Greek letter Theta (Θ θ/ϑ) and Latin letter Q. In the Unicode text-encoding standard, this letter is called "Abkhazian Ha".

Its ISO 9 Romanization is the Latin letter O with grave accent (Ò ò). In English, O-hook is commonly romanized using the Latin letter O with dot below (Ọ ọ).

O-hook is used in the Cyrillic alphabet of the Abkhaz language where it represents the labial-palatal approximant /ɥ/, the sound of ⟨ui⟩ in French "huit" ([ɥi]). It is placed between Ы and Џ in the Abkhaz alphabet.

== Computing codes ==
Character information
Preview	Ҩ		ҩ	
Unicode name	CYRILLIC CAPITAL LETTER; ABKHAZIAN HA		CYRILLIC SMALL LETTER; ABKHAZIAN HA	
Encodings	decimal	hex	dec	hex
Unicode	1192	U+04A8	1193	U+04A9
UTF-8	210 168	D2 A8	210 169	D2 A9
Numeric character reference	&#1192;	&#x4A8;	&#1193;	&#x4A9;

- In Unicode version 1.0, the letters were called CYRILLIC CAPITAL/SMALL LETTER O HOOK.
