= U with diaeresis (Cyrillic) =

Cyrillic letter

- Ӱ ӱ

Usage
- Writing system: Cyrillic
- Type: Alphabetic
- Sound values: [y]

History
- Development: УԐ уԑ: У: у: Ӱ ӱ

U with diaeresis (Ӱ ӱ; italics: Ӱ ӱ) is a letter of the Cyrillic script, derived from the Cyrillic letter U (У у У у).

U with diaeresis is used in the alphabets of the Altai, Khakas, Khanty, Mari and Shor languages, where it represents the close front rounded vowel /y/, the pronunciation of the Latin letter U with umlaut (Ü ü) in German. It is also used in the Komi-Yodzyak language.

== Usage ==
The Cyrillic U with diaeresis was formally used in the Rusyn language and used in the Cyrillization of Albanian.

It is also used in the Russian language in loanwords.

== Computing codes ==
Character information
Preview	Ӱ		ӱ	
Unicode name	CYRILLIC CAPITAL LETTER; U WITH DIAERESIS		CYRILLIC SMALL LETTER; U WITH DIAERESIS	
Encodings	decimal	hex	dec	hex
Unicode	1264	U+04F0	1265	U+04F1
UTF-8	211 176	D3 B0	211 177	D3 B1
Numeric character reference	&#1264;	&#x4F0;	&#1265;	&#x4F1;

== See also ==
- Ü ü : Latin U with diaeresis - an Azerbaijani, Estonian, German, Hungarian, Turkish, and Turkmen letter
- Ư ư : Latin letter U with horn, used in Vietnamese alphabet
- Y y : Latin letter Y, as used in Danish, Finnish, Norwegian and Swedish for this sound /y/
- Ӳ ӳ : Cyrillic letter U with double acute
- Ү ү : Cyrillic letter Ue
- Ұ ұ : Cyrillic letter straight U with stroke (Kazakh mid U)
- U u: Latin letter U, same sound in French, Icelandic and Dutch
- Cyrillic characters in Unicode
