= Dhe (Cyrillic) =

Cyrillic letter used in Bashkir and Wakhi

Ze with descender
- Ҙ ҙ

Usage
- Writing system: Cyrillic
- Type: Alphabetic
- Sound values: [ð], [d͡z]

History
- Transliterations: Dh dh

Ze with descender or Dhe (Ҙ ҙ; italics: Ҙ ҙ), is a letter of the Cyrillic script. It is used in both the Bashkir and Wakhi languages, where it represents the voiced dental fricative /ð/ (like the ⟨th⟩ in this) and the voiced alveolar affricate /d͡z/ (like the ⟨ds⟩ in lads) respectively. Its form is derived from the Cyrillic letter Ze (З з З з). It is romanized as Z with acute ⟨ź⟩ for Bashkir, and corresponds with Ezh ⟨ʒ⟩ in the Latin script of the Wakhi language and the Shughni language.

The letter itself was introduced in 1939.

== Computing codes ==
Character information
Preview	Ҙ		ҙ	
Unicode name	CYRILLIC CAPITAL LETTER; ZE WITH DESCENDER		CYRILLIC SMALL LETTER; ZE WITH DESCENDER	
Encodings	decimal	hex	dec	hex
Unicode	1176	U+0498	1177	U+0499
UTF-8	210 152	D2 98	210 153	D2 99
Numeric character reference	&#1176;	&#x498;	&#1177;	&#x499;

== See also ==
- З з : Cyrillic letter Ze
- Ð ð : Latin letter Eth
- Cyrillic characters in Unicode
