= Dwe (Cyrillic) =

Cyrillic letter formerly used in Abkhaz

- Ꚁ ꚁ

Usage
- Writing system: Cyrillic
- Type: Alphabetic
- Language of origin: Abkhaz
- Sound values: [dʷ]

History
- Time period: 1862-1925

Dwe (Ꚁ ꚁ; italics: Ꚁ ꚁ) is a letter of the Cyrillic script. It has a protruding vertical stroke (upturn), as with the Cyrillic Ghe with upturn (Ґ ґ Ґ ґ), in the upper left corner of the Cyrillic De (Д д Д д).

== Usage ==
Dwe was used in the old Cyrillic alphabet for the Abkhaz language, where it represented a labialized voiced alveolar stop /dʷ/, like the pronunciation of ⟨dw⟩ in "dwarf". It corresponds to Дә in the new alphabet.

== Computing codes ==
Character information
Preview	Ꚁ		ꚁ	
Unicode name	CYRILLIC CAPITAL LETTER DWE		CYRILLIC SMALL LETTER DWE	
Encodings	decimal	hex	dec	hex
Unicode	42624	U+A680	42625	U+A681
UTF-8	234 154 128	EA 9A 80	234 154 129	EA 9A 81
Numeric character reference	&#42624;	&#xA680;	&#42625;	&#xA681;

== See also ==
- Д д : Cyrillic letter De
- Cyrillic characters in Unicode
