= Yery with diaeresis =

Cyrillic letter

- Ӹ ӹ

Usage
- Writing system: Cyrillic
- Type: Alphabetic
- Language of origin: Mari language
- Sound values: /ə̟/

Yery with diaeresis (Ӹ ӹ; italics: Ӹ ӹ) is a letter of the Cyrillic script. Its form is derived from the Cyrillic letter Yery (Ы ы Ы ы). In Unicode, this letter is known as "Yeru with Diaeresis".

Yery with diaeresis is used in the alphabet of the Hill Mari language, where it represents a fronted mid central vowel /ə̟/, which is the front counterpart of the mid central vowel /ə/ (represented by ы). It also appears in the Northwestern Mari language.

== Unicode ==
- U+04F8 Ӹ CYRILLIC CAPITAL LETTER YERU WITH DIAERESIS
- U+04F9 ӹ CYRILLIC SMALL LETTER YERU WITH DIAERESIS

== See also ==
- Cyrillic characters in Unicode
- Ÿ ÿ : Latin letter Ÿ
