= En with left hook =

Cyrillic letter used for /ɲ/ in Orok

- Ԩ ԩ

Usage
- Writing system: Cyrillic
- Type: Alphabetic
- Sound values: /ɲ/

En with left hook (Ԩ ԩ; italics: Ԩ ԩ) is a letter of the Cyrillic script.

En with left hook is used in the Orok language, where it represents the palatal nasal /ɲ/, like the pronunciation of ⟨ni⟩ in "onion". When the En has a hook on the right side, Cyrillic letter En with hook (Ӈ ӈ Ӈ ӈ), it is another letter, where it represents the velar nasal /ŋ/.

== Computing codes ==
Character information
Preview	Ԩ		ԩ	
Unicode name	CYRILLIC CAPITAL LETTER; EN WITH LEFT HOOK		CYRILLIC SMALL LETTER; EN WITH LEFT HOOK	
Encodings	decimal	hex	dec	hex
Unicode	1320	U+0528	1321	U+0529
UTF-8	212 168	D4 A8	212 169	D4 A9
Numeric character reference	&#1320;	&#x528;	&#1321;	&#x529;

== See also ==
- Њ њ : Cyrillic letter Nje, a South Slavic letter uses for the /ɲ/ sound.
- Ӈ ӈ : Cyrillic letter En with hook
- Ɲ ɲ : Latin letter N with left hook
- Cyrillic characters in Unicode
