= Che with descender =

Cyrillic letter

- Ҷ ҷ

Usage
- Writing system: Cyrillic
- Type: Alphabetic
- Sound values: /t͡ʃʼ/, /d͡ʒ/

Che with descender (Ҷ ҷ; italics: Ҷ ҷ) is a letter of the Cyrillic script. Its form is derived from the Cyrillic letter Che (Ч ч Ч ч). In the ISO 9 system of romanization, Che with descender is transliterated using the Latin letter C-cedilla (Ç ç).

Che with descender is used in the alphabets of the following languages:

Language	Pronunciation	Romanization
Abkhaz	/t͡ʃʼ/ postalveolar ejective affricate	
Shughni	/d͡ʒ/ voiced postalveolar affricate	j (Latin equivalent)
Tajik	/d͡ʒ/ voiced postalveolar affricate	ç, j
Wakhi	/d͡ʒ/ voiced postalveolar affricate	ǰ (Latin equivalent)

Che with descender corresponds in other Cyrillic alphabets to the digraphs ⟨дж⟩ or ⟨чж⟩, or to the letters Che with vertical stroke (Ҹ ҹ), Dzhe (Џ џ), Khakassian Che (Ӌ ӌ), Zhe with breve (Ӂ ӂ), Zhe with diaeresis (Ӝ ӝ), or Zhje (Җ җ).

In the Surgut dialect of the Khanty language and in the Tofa language, che with descender is sometimes used in place of che with hook, which has not yet been encoded in Unicode.

== Computing codes ==
Character information
Preview	Ҷ		ҷ	
Unicode name	CYRILLIC CAPITAL LETTER; CHE WITH DESCENDER		CYRILLIC SMALL LETTER; CHE WITH DESCENDER	
Encodings	decimal	hex	dec	hex
Unicode	1206	U+04B6	1207	U+04B7
UTF-8	210 182	D2 B6	210 183	D2 B7
Numeric character reference	&#1206;	&#x4B6;	&#1207;	&#x4B7;

== See also ==
- Ç ç : Latin letter C with cedilla - an Albanian, Azerbaijani, Gagauz, Kurdish, Turkish, and Turkmen letter
- Cyrillic characters in Unicode
