= Abkhazian Dze =

Cyrillic letter used in Abkhaz and Uilta

- Ӡ ӡ

Usage
- Writing system: Cyrillic
- Type: Alphabetic
- Sound values: [dz], [dʒ]

History
- Development: З: Ӡ ӡ

Abkhazian Dze (Ӡ ӡ; italics: Ӡ ӡ) is a letter of the Cyrillic script. It is used in Abkhaz where it represents a voiced alveolar affricate [dz], pronounced like ⟨ds⟩ in pods.

It is also used in a 2007 alphabet for the Uilta language, where it represents a voiced postalveolar affricate [dʒ], as in the ⟨j⟩ in jam. It was also used in one 1937 proposal (not adopted) for the Karelian language. It is also used in the Negidal language.

The letter is often homoglyphic with the Latin letter Ezh ⟨Ʒ ʒ⟩, but in some fonts the uppercase form of the Abkhazian Dze has no descender or has a shortened tail.

This letter is equivalent to the more common Cyrillic Dze, differing only in shape.

== Computing codes ==
Character information
Preview	Ӡ		ӡ	
Unicode name	CYRILLIC CAPITAL LETTER; ABKHASIAN DZE		CYRILLIC SMALL LETTER; ABKHASIAN DZE	
Encodings	decimal	hex	dec	hex
Unicode	1248	U+04E0	1249	U+04E1
UTF-8	211 160	D3 A0	211 161	D3 A1
Numeric character reference	&#1248;	&#x4E0;	&#1249;	&#x4E1;

== See also ==
- Ʒ ʒ : Latin letter Ezh
- Ʃ ʃ : Latin letter Esh
- S s : Cyrillic letter Dze (Macedonian Dze)
- Cyrillic characters in Unicode
