= E with diaeresis (Cyrillic) =

Cyrillic letter

- Ӭ ӭ

Usage
- Writing system: Cyrillic
- Type: Alphabetic

E with diaeresis (Ӭ ӭ; italics: Ӭ ӭ) is a letter of the Cyrillic script. Its form is derived from the Cyrillic letter E (Э э Э э).

E with diaeresis is used in the alphabet of the Kildin Sami language and Ter Sami language, where it represents the close-mid front unrounded vowel /e/, following a palatalized (sometimes called "half-palatalized") stop, /nʲ, tʲ, dʲ/. In Moksha, it was used for the near-open front unrounded vowel /æ/, however, in contemporary Moksha it has been replaced by Я or word-initially by Э.

== Computing codes ==
Character information
Preview	Ӭ		ӭ	
Unicode name	CYRILLIC CAPITAL LETTER; E WITH DIAERESIS		CYRILLIC SMALL LETTER; E WITH DIAERESIS	
Encodings	decimal	hex	dec	hex
Unicode	1260	U+04EC	1261	U+04ED
UTF-8	211 172	D3 AC	211 173	D3 AD
Numeric character reference	&#1260;	&#x4EC;	&#1261;	&#x4ED;

== See also ==
- Ë ë : Latin letter Ë
- Ё ё : Cyrillic letter Yo
- Cyrillic characters in Unicode
