= Cyrillic Extended-C =

- Range: U+1C80..U+1C8F (16 code points)
- Plane: BMP
- Scripts: Cyrillic
- Major alphabets: Old Cyrillic
- Assigned: 11 code points
- Unused: 5 reserved code points

Unicode version history
- 9.0 (2016): 9 (+9)
- 16.0 (2024): 11 (+2)

Unicode documentation
- Code chart ∣ Web page

Cyrillic Extended-C is a Unicode block containing Cyrillic characters mostly for facsimile reprinting Old Believer service books. The first 9 characters are (contextual) graphic variants of standard Cyrillic rather than distinct letters.

Cyrillic Extended-C^{[1]}^{[2]} Official Unicode Consortium code chart (PDF)
	0	1	2	3	4	5	6	7	8	9	A	B	C	D	E	F
U+1C8x	ᲀ	ᲁ	ᲂ	ᲃ	ᲄ	ᲅ	ᲆ	ᲇ	ᲈ	Ᲊ	ᲊ					
Notes: 1. As of Unicode version 16.0; 2. Grey areas indicate non-assigned code points

== History ==
The following Unicode-related documents record the purpose and process of defining specific characters in the Cyrillic Extended-C block:

Version	Final code points (Note: Proposed code points and characters names may differ from final code points and names)	Count	L2 ID	WG2 ID	Document
9.0	U+1C80..1C88	9	L2/00-128		Bunz, Carl-Martin (2000-03-01), Scripts from the Past in Future Versions of Unicode
9.0	U+1C80..1C88	9	L2/13-153		Andreev, Aleksandr; Shardt, Yuri; Simmons, Nikita (2013-07-20), Proposal to Use Standardized Variation Sequences to Encode Church Slavonic Glyph Variants in Unicode
9.0	U+1C80..1C88	9	L2/13-164		Cleminson, Ralph; Birnbaum, David (2013-07-25), Feedback from Experts on Cyrillic proposals
9.0	U+1C80..1C88	9	L2/14-196	N4607 (Note: WG2 document differs from the L2 document)	Andreev, Aleksandr; Shardt, Yuri; Simmons, Nikita (2014-08-06), Proposal to Encode Additional Cyrillic Characters used in Early Church Slavonic Printed Books
9.0	U+1C80..1C88	9		N4645	Kravetsky, Aleksandr G. (2014-09-27), Letter in support of "Proposal to Encode Additional Cyrillic Characters used in Early Church Slavonic Printed Books"
9.0	U+1C80..1C88	9	L2/14-177		Moore, Lisa (2014-10-17), "Proposal to encode additional Cyrillic characters (C.7.1.1)", UTC #140 Minutes
9.0	U+1C80..1C88	9	L2/16-052	N4603 (pdf, doc)	Umamaheswaran, V. S. (2015-09-01), "M63.08", Unconfirmed minutes of WG 2 meeting 63
16.0	U+1C89..1C8A	2	L2/22-119		Manulov, Nikita (2022-06-16), Proposal to encode Cyrillic letter Khanty Tje
16.0	U+1C89..1C8A	2	L2/22-128		Anderson, Deborah; Whistler, Ken; Pournader, Roozbeh; Constable, Peter (2022-07-20), "1a Khanty Cyrillic Letter", Recommendations to UTC #172 July 2022 on Script Proposals
16.0	U+1C89..1C8A	2	L2/22-121		Constable, Peter (2022-08-01), "Consensus 172-C4", Draft Minutes of UTC Meeting 172, "The UTC accepts U+1C89 CYRILLIC CAPITAL LETTER TJE and U+1C8A CYRILLIC SMALL LETTER TJE"
16.0	U+1C89..1C8A	2	L2/23-234		Scherer, Markus; Hadley, Josh (2023-10-25), "2.2", UTC #177 properties feedback & recommendations
16.0	U+1C89..1C8A	2	L2/23-231		Constable, Peter (2023-12-08), "Note 177-N8", UTC #177 Minutes, "The PAG has corrected the Titlecase_Mapping for U+1C8A CYRILLIC SMALL LETTER TJE"
16.0	U+1C89..1C8A	2	L2/24-104		Manulov, Nikita (2024-03-30), Annotation for Cyrillic Tje
16.0	U+1C89..1C8A	2	L2/24-068		Anderson, Deborah; Goregaokar, Manish; Kučera, Jan; Whistler, Ken; Pournader, Roozbeh; Constable, Peter (2024-04-18), "3. Cyrillic", Recommendations to UTC #179 April 2024 on Script Proposals
