= Neutral Yer =

Cyrillic letter

Usage
- Writing system: Cyrillic
- Type: Alphabetic

Neutral Yer (Ꙏ ꙏ) is a letter of the Cyrillic script.

In transcriptions of Church Slavonic, it is used to indicate Ь or Ъ when it is not possible to tell the difference in a historic manuscript.

It has the appearance of a yer, but with a hook at the top of the stem. In some fonts it appears identical to Ъ.

== Computing codes ==
Character information
| Preview | Ꙏ | | ꙏ | |
|---|---|---|---|---|
| Unicode name | CYRILLIC CAPITAL LETTER NEUTRAL YER | | CYRILLIC SMALL LETTER NEUTRAL YER | |
| Encodings | decimal | hex | dec | hex |
| Unicode | 42574 | U+A64E | 42575 | U+A64F |
| UTF-8 | 234 153 142 | EA 99 8E | 234 153 143 | EA 99 8F |
| Numeric character reference | &#42574; | &#xA64E; | &#42575; | &#xA64F; |
