= A with diaeresis (Cyrillic) =

Cyrillic letter

- Ӓ ӓ

Usage
- Writing system: Cyrillic
- Type: Alphabetic
- Sound values: [æ], [ɐ], [ja]

History
- Development: А а: Ӓ ӓ

A with diaeresis (Ӓ ӓ; italics: Ӓ ӓ) is a letter of the Cyrillic script. In all its forms it looks exactly like the Latin letter A with diaeresis (Ä ä Ä ä).

It is used in the Khanty, Kildin Sami, Ter Sami, and Hill Mari languages. Also, this letter was once used in the Gagauz language (where it has been replaced with ⟨аь⟩).

It was used in the Bashkir language at the end of the 19th century. It corresponds to the Cyrillic letter schwa ⟨ә⟩ in modern Bashkir.

This letter is also used in Bulgarian and Serbian in some of its dialects.

== Usage ==
In Hill Mari and Gagauz this letter represents the near-open front unrounded vowel /æ/.

In Kildin Sami and Ter Sami this letter represents the open back unrounded vowel /a/ following a palatalized (sometimes called "half-palatalized") velar nasal /nʲ/ or one of the alveolar stops /tʲ/ or /dʲ/.

In Khanty this letter represents the near-open central vowel /ɐ/.

Some languages represent as /ja/, like in letter ⟨Я⟩.

A with diaeresis is used in some South Slavic languages, mainly in Bulgarian and Serbian to mark a shifting accent, not only in declensions but elsewhere: брӓт or млāдä.

== Computing codes ==
Character information
Preview	Ӓ		ӓ	
Unicode name	CYRILLIC CAPITAL LETTER; A WITH DIAERESIS		CYRILLIC SMALL LETTER; A WITH DIAERESIS	
Encodings	decimal	hex	dec	hex
Unicode	1234	U+04D2	1235	U+04D3
UTF-8	211 146	D3 92	211 147	D3 93
Numeric character reference	&#1234;	&#x4D2;	&#1235;	&#x4D3;

== Related characters ==
- A a : Latin letter A
- Ä ä : Latin letter A with diaeresis - an Estonian, Finnish, German, Luxembourgish, Slovak and Swedish letter
- А а : Cyrillic A
- Ææ : Ash
- Ææ : AE ligature (Cyrillic)
- Αα : Alpha
