= Shwe (Cyrillic) =

Cyrillic letter formerly used in Abkhaz

- Ꚗ ꚗ

Usage
- Writing system: Cyrillic
- Type: Alphabetic
- Sound values: /ʃʷ/

History
- Development: Ш ш: Ꚗ ꚗ
- Transliterations: Ş̌ ş̌

Shwe (Ꚗ ꚗ; italics: Ꚗ ꚗ) is a letter of the Cyrillic script. It resembles the letter Sha (Ш ш; Ш ш) with a long tail attached to its bottom.

Shwe is used in an old orthography of the Abkhaz language, where it represents the labialized voiceless palato-alveolar sibilant /ʃʷ/. It corresponds to Шә.

== Computing codes ==
Character information
| Preview | Ꚗ | | ꚗ | |
|---|---|---|---|---|
| Unicode name | CYRILLIC CAPITAL LETTER SHWE | | CYRILLIC SMALL LETTER SHWE | |
| Encodings | decimal | hex | dec | hex |
| Unicode | 42646 | U+A696 | 42647 | U+A697 |
| UTF-8 | 234 154 150 | EA 9A 96 | 234 154 151 | EA 9A 97 |
| Numeric character reference | &#42646; | &#xA696; | &#42647; | &#xA697; |

== See also ==
- Ш ш : Cyrillic letter Sha
- Cyrillic characters in Unicode
