= Te Tse (Cyrillic) =

Cyrillic letter

- Ҵ ҵ

Usage
- Writing system: Cyrillic
- Type: Alphabetic
- Language of origin: Abkhaz
- Sound values: /tsʼ/
- In Unicode: U+04B4, U+04B5

Te Tse (Ҵ ҵ; italics: Ҵ ҵ) is a letter of the Cyrillic script. Its shape comes from a ligature of the Cyrillic letters Te (Т т Т т) and Tse (Ц ц Ц ц).

Te Tse is used in the Abkhaz alphabet, where it represents the alveolar ejective affricate /tsʼ/, ordered between the digraphs Цә and Ҵә.

Te Tse is romanized as ⟨c̄⟩ in ISO 9.

== Computing codes ==
Character information
Preview	Ҵ		ҵ	
Unicode name	CYRILLIC CAPITAL LIGATURE TE TSE		CYRILLIC SMALL LIGATURE TE TSE	
Encodings	decimal	hex	dec	hex
Unicode	1204	U+04B4	1205	U+04B5
UTF-8	210 180	D2 B4	210 181	D2 B5
Numeric character reference	&#1204;	&#x4B4;	&#1205;	&#x4B5;

== See also ==
- Ċ ċ : Latin letter Ċ
- Cyrillic characters in Unicode
