= Kha with descender =

Cyrillic letter

- Ҳ ҳ

Usage
- Writing system: Cyrillic
- Type: Alphabetic
- Sound values: /ħ/, /h/

History
Development
R11
    - Ξ ξ
      - Χ χ
        - Х х
          - Ҳ ҳ

Kha with descender (Ҳ ҳ; italics: Ҳ ҳ) is a letter of the Cyrillic script. In Unicode, this letter is called "Ha with descender". Its form is derived from the Greek letter Chi and Cyrillic letter Kha (Х х Х х).

Kha with descender is used in the alphabet of the following languages:

Language	Pronunciation	Position in alphabet	Romanization	Notes
Abkhaz	/ħ/	40th	h	
Karakalpak	/h/	31st	h	until 2016, when a new Latin alphabet was introduced.
Shughni	/h/	36th	h	
Tajik	/h/	28th	h	
Uzbek	/h/	Final	h	until 1992, when a Latin alphabet was introduced, though Cyrillic is still used to this day.
Wakhi	/h/	35th	h (Latin equivalent)	

== Computing codes ==
Character information
Preview	Ҳ		ҳ	
Unicode name	CYRILLIC CAPITAL LETTER; HA WITH DESCENDER		CYRILLIC SMALL LETTER; HA WITH DESCENDER	
Encodings	decimal	hex	dec	hex
Unicode	1202	U+04B2	1203	U+04B3
UTF-8	210 178	D2 B2	210 179	D2 B3
Numeric character reference	&#1202;	&#x4B2;	&#1203;	&#x4B3;

== See also ==
- Ⱨ ⱨ : Latin letter H with descender
- Ĥ ĥ : Latin letter H with circumflex
- Cyrillic characters in Unicode
