= Zhje =

Cyrillic letter used in four languages

- Җ җ

Usage
- Writing system: Cyrillic
- Type: Alphabetic
- Sound values: [dʒ], [dʑ], [ʑ], [tʂ], [tɕ]

Zhje or Zhe with descender (Җ җ; italics: Җ җ) is a letter of the Cyrillic script. Its form is derived from the Cyrillic letter Zhe (Ж ж Ж ж) with an addition of a descender on its right leg.

== Usage ==
Zhje is used in the alphabets of the Dungan, Kalmyk, Tatar, Turkmen, Chulym and Uyghur languages.

| Language | Position in alphabet | Pronunciation (Note: See the linked article for a description of the pronunciation.) | Romanization (Note: Bold face indicates the equivalent letter in the official Latin alphabet for the language.) |
|---|---|---|---|
| Chulym | 11th | /ʑ/ voiced alveolo-palatal fricative | |
| Kalmyk | 11th | /d͡ʒ/ voiced postalveolar affricate | j, dzh |
| Turkmen | 9th | /d͡ʒ/ voiced postalveolar affricate | j |
| Dungan | 10th | /tʂ/ voiceless retroflex affricate /tɕ/ voiceless alveolo-palatal affricate | zh, ⱬ |
| Tatar | 10th | /dʑ/ voiced alveolo-palatal affricate /ʑ/ voiced alveolo-palatal fricative | c |
| Uyghur | 10th | /d͡ʒ/ Voiced postalveolar affricate | j |

== Computing codes ==
Character information
| Preview | Җ | | җ | |
|---|---|---|---|---|
| Unicode name | CYRILLIC CAPITAL LETTER; ZHE WITH DESCENDER | | CYRILLIC SMALL LETTER; ZHE WITH DESCENDER | |
| Encodings | decimal | hex | dec | hex |
| Unicode | 1174 | U+0496 | 1175 | U+0497 |
| UTF-8 | 210 150 | D2 96 | 210 151 | D2 97 |
| Numeric character reference | &#1174; | &#x496; | &#1175; | &#x497; |

== See also ==
- Cyrillic characters in Unicode
