= Kildin Sámi orthography =

Writing systems for the Kildin Sámi language

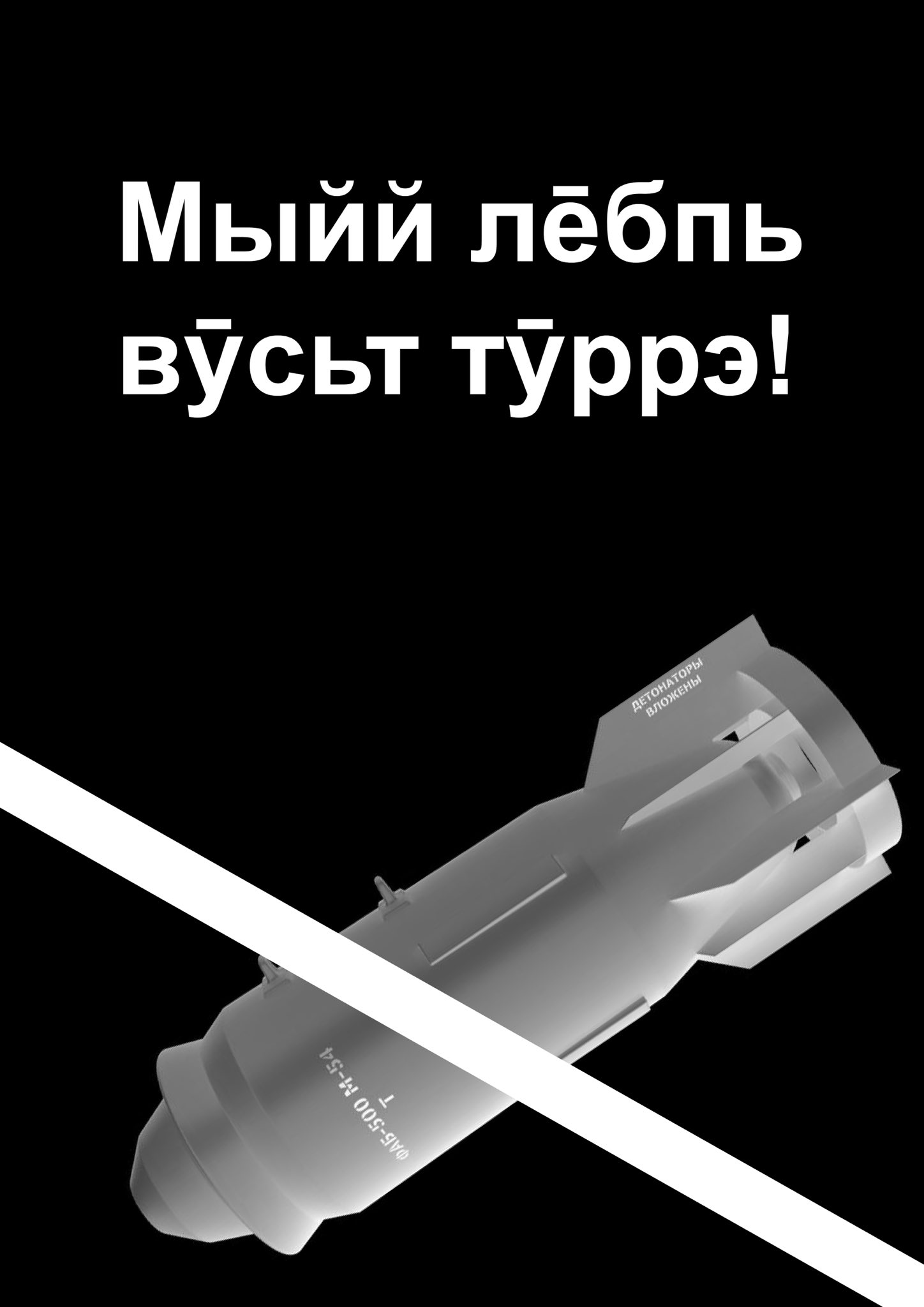
"We are against the war!" Anti-war poster in contemporary Kildin Sami orthography

Over the last century, the alphabet used to write Kildin Sámi has changed three times: from Cyrillic to Latin and back again to Cyrillic before the current extended Cyrillic alphabet was introduced.

== The first Cyrillic period ==
A couple of religious pamphlets were published in Kildin Sámi in Russia and using Cyrillic letters while the Tsars were in power. In addition, the Gospel of Matthew (Kildin Sami: ‌Махьтвеест Пась-Евангели) was translated (partly into Kildin, partly into Akkala Sámi) by the Finnish linguist Arvid Genetz and published by the Finnish Literature Society in 1878 using the Cyrillic letters of the pre-Soviet Russian alphabet plus additionally the letter Ƞ ƞ for the voiced velar nasal.

А а	Б б	В в	Г г	Д д	Е е	Ё ё	Ж ж
З з	И и	Й й	І і	К к	Л л	М м	Н н
Ƞ ƞ	О о	П п	Р р	С с	Т т	У у	Ф ф
Х х	Ц ц	Ч ч	Ш ш	Щ щ	Ъ ъ	Ы ы	Ь ь
Э э	Ю ю	Я я	Ѳ ѳ

== The Latin period ==
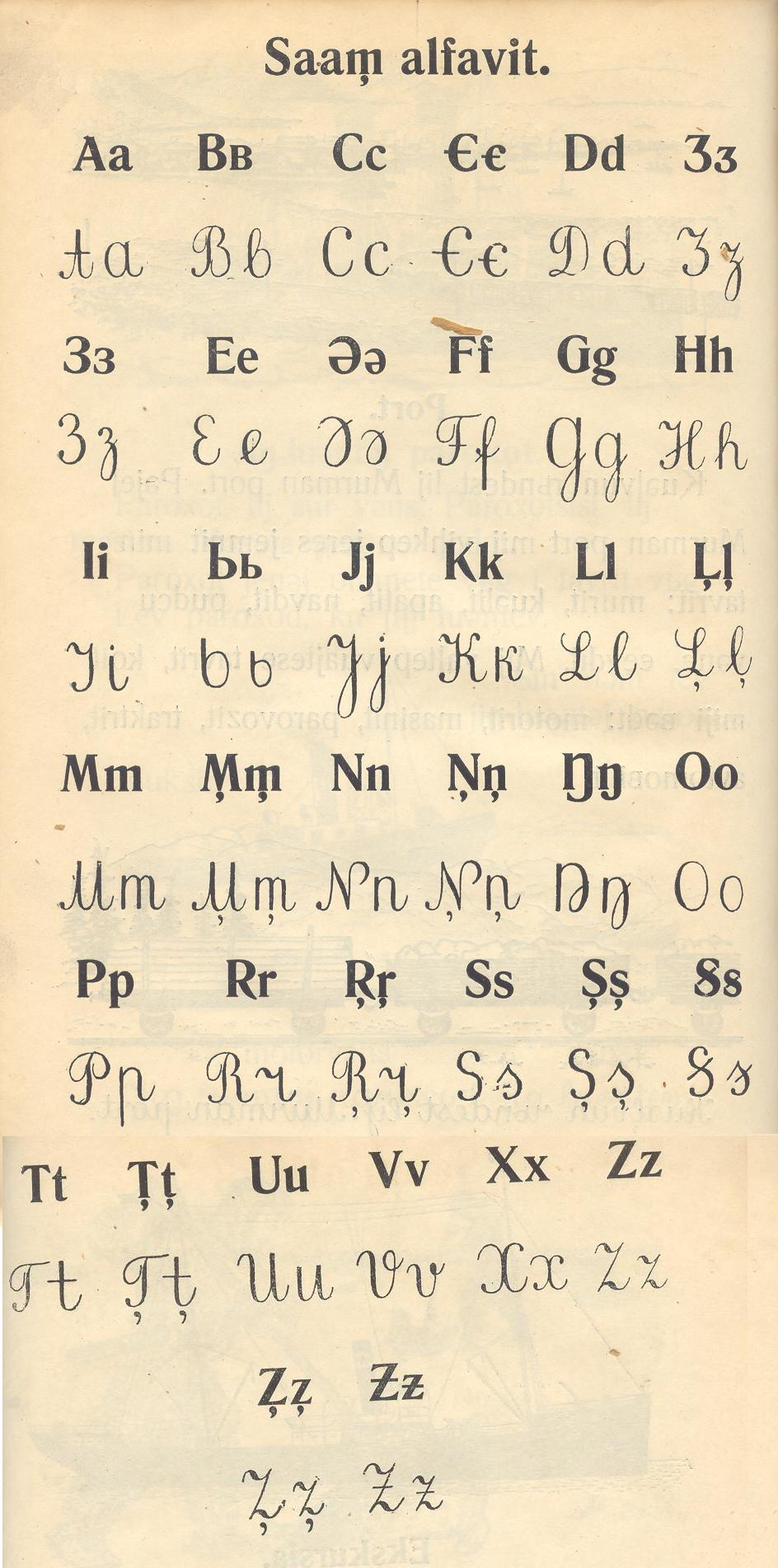
The first version of the Kildin Sámi alphabet printed in Chernjakov's primer from 1933

After the Russian Revolution, the Soviet language policy stated, as a part of the so-called Korenizatsiya policy, that all minority languages in the Soviet Union should have their own written languages, that the minorities should be taught to read and write them, and that they should receive education in their own tongue.

In 1932, a group from the Institute of the Peoples of the North travelled to Notozero to study the dialect of Sámi spoken there. Their studies resulted in a primer based on Kildin Sámi being published by Zachary Chernjakov in 1933, although part of it was taken from the Sámi spoken in Notozero. Chernjakov and Aleksandr Endjukovski played a central role in this research. According to Endjukovski, the reason why the Kildin dialect was chosen was that it was both geographically the most central of the dialects and that it had more speakers than the other dialects did. With the exception of the dialect spoken in Notozero, which is actually a dialect of Skolt Sámi, the difference between the various Kildin Sámi dialects is more of a lexical difference than a grammatical difference. For this reason, Endjukovski decided that a literary language for Kildin Sámi could be created. Endjukovski, Chernjakov and co-workers also used the research done during 1932–1933 to publish textbooks for arithmetic and reading, outlines of the grammar of Kildin Sámi, a couple of children's book and political pamphlets.

The following chart presents the full letter inventory of the alphabet used in Endjukovski's grammar from 1937. All consonants may be either palatalized on non-palatalized with the exceptions of Ꞓ and Ʒ, which are obligatorily palatalized. Some palatalized letters are typeset with cedillas but most with combining commas; usage is inconsistent even for the same letter in the same paragraph. Commas are used here as they have better Unicode support.

A a	Å å	B ʙ	B̦ ʙ̦	C c	C̦ c̦	Ꞓ ꞓ	D d	D̦ d̦
Ʒ ʒ	Ɜ ɜ	Ɜ̦ ɜ̦	E e	Ə ə	F f	F̦ f̦	G g	Ģ ģ
H h	H̦ h̦	I i	Ь ь	J j	K k	Ķ ķ	L l	L̦ l̦
M m	M̦ m̦	N n	Ņ ņ	Ŋ ŋ	Ŋ̒ ŋ̒	O o	P p	P̦ p̦
R r	Ŗ ŗ	S s	Ș ș	Ꞩ ꞩ	Ꞩ̦ ꞩ̦	T t	Ț ț	U u
V v	V̦ v̦	X x	X̦ x̦	Z z	Z̦ z̦	Ƶ ƶ	Ƶ̦ ƶ̦

== The second Cyrillic period ==
In 1937, the Cyrillic alphabet was restored to replace the Latin alphabet. The same year, Endjukovskij published two more textbooks — a primer and a reader — this time using the new alphabet. The Russian linguist G.M. Kert writes that teaching in Sámi stopped already in 1937, without any explanation. Kildin Sámi shares the fate of the other Finno-Ugric minorities that surround Finland, such as Karelian and Vepsian, in that they lost their language rights after World War II. One possible explanation for this is that the Soviet Union quite strongly pushed Russification in these border areas for security reasons.

== The third and present-day Cyrillic alphabet ==
The second new Cyrillic orthography for Kildin Sámi was developed in the late 1970s and 1980s, containing 51 letters. In 1976, Russian educator and linguist Rimma Kuruch from Murmansk invited Sámi teachers Aleksandra Antonova and Boris Gluchow to join her in founding a working group to create a new alphabet and teaching materials. Kuruch wanted to reinstate instruction in the native language as it had become apparent that Sámi children make a lot of errors in their Russian due to interference. Because their mother tongue was not Russian, Kildin Sámi needed to be taught in school.

Instruction in contemporary Kildin Sámi was first incorporated into the curriculum at the end of the 1970s in the village of Lovozero. In 1982, the first modern primer for preparatory classes in Sámi, entitled Саамский букварь (Saamski bukvar), written by Aleksandra Antonova, was published. The Kildin Sámi alphabet used in the book was based on the alphabet for Russian, extended with different diacritic characters on vowel letters marking quantity and palatalization, as well as several modified consonant letters representing sounds not found in Russian.

Upon collaboration with linguists from the Soviet Academy of Sciences and together with several more Sámi collaborators, Kuruch's working group in Murmansk has published a large number of dictionaries, textbooks for elementary schools, didactic guidelines, and literary texts for children. At the same time, the orthography underwent several revisions, including the introduction of two additional letters for the alphabet. As a result, there now exist different orthographic variants.

The following chart lists the complete letter inventory, including two variants (in parentheses). The inclusion of Һ and Ј was considered by some Soviet officials to be too "Western" and they insisted on the use of ʼ and Ҋ instead.

А а	А̄ а̄	Ӓ ӓ	Ӓ̄ ӓ̄	Б б	В в	Г г	Д д	Е е	Е̄ е̄
Ё ё	Ё̄ ё̄	Ж ж	З з	Һ һ (ʼ)	И и	Ӣ ӣ	Й й	Ј ј (Ҋ ҋ)	К к
Л л	Ӆ ӆ	М м	Ӎ ӎ	Н н	Ӊ ӊ	Ӈ ӈ	О о	О̄ о̄	П п
Р р	Ҏ ҏ	С с	Т т	У у	Ӯ ӯ	Ф ф	Х х	Ц ц	Ч ч
Ш ш	Ъ ъ	Ы ы	Ы̄ ы̄	Ь ь	Ҍ ҍ	Э э	Э̄ э̄	Ӭ ӭ	Ӭ̄ ӭ̄
Ю ю	Ю̄ ю̄	Я я	Я̄ я̄

== See also ==
- Sámi languages
- Sámi orthography

== Bibliography ==
- Chernjakov, Zachary E. (Russian: Черняков, Захарий Е.) Саамский букварь. Москва, 1933.
- Endjukovskij, Aleksandr G. (Russian: Эндюковский, Александр Г.) Saamskij (loparskij) jazyk. Jazyki i pis'mennost' narodov severa. I. Moskva-Leningrad, 1937.
- Genetz, Arvid (translator) Махьтвеест Пась-Евангели. Самас = Евангеліе отъ Матѳея (на русско-лопарскомъ языкъ), изданное Обществомъ Распространенія Библіи въ Велико-Британіи и въ другихъ странахъ. Helsinki, 1878.
- Kert, Georgij M. (Russian: Керт, Георгий М.). "Saamskij jazyk". In: Osnovy finno-ugorskogo jazykoznanija. Pribaltijsko-finskie, saamskij i mordovskie jazyki. Moskva, 1975, 203–247.
- Rießler, Michael. Towards a digital infrastructure for Kildin Saami. In: Sustaining Indigenous Knowledge, ed. by Erich Kasten, Erich and Tjeerd de Graaf. Fürstenberg, 2013, 195–218.
- Utvik, Unni K. Kolasamene - fra tsarens undersåtter til sovjetiske borgere. MA-thesis, Russisk institutt, Universitetet i Bergen, 1985. hdl:1956/2480
