= Eastern Mansi =

Extinct Uralic language spoken in Russia

- маньсь лынгх маньсь нялм маньсь не̄лм ляӈх / лях ма̊̄ньщха̊р не̄лм ляӈх
- Pronunciation: [mɒnʲsʲ lʲɘŋx], [mɒnʲsʲ nʲæləm]
- Native to: Russia
- Region: Khanty–Mansi
- Extinct: 2018, with the death of Maksim Šivtorov
- Language family: Uralic: Finno-Ugric?; Ugric?; Ob-Ugric?; Mansi; Core; Central; Eastern Mansi
- Dialects: Konda (Middle/Lower/Upper); Yukonda

Language codes
- ISO 639-3: –
- Glottolog: east2879
- ELP: Eastern Mansi
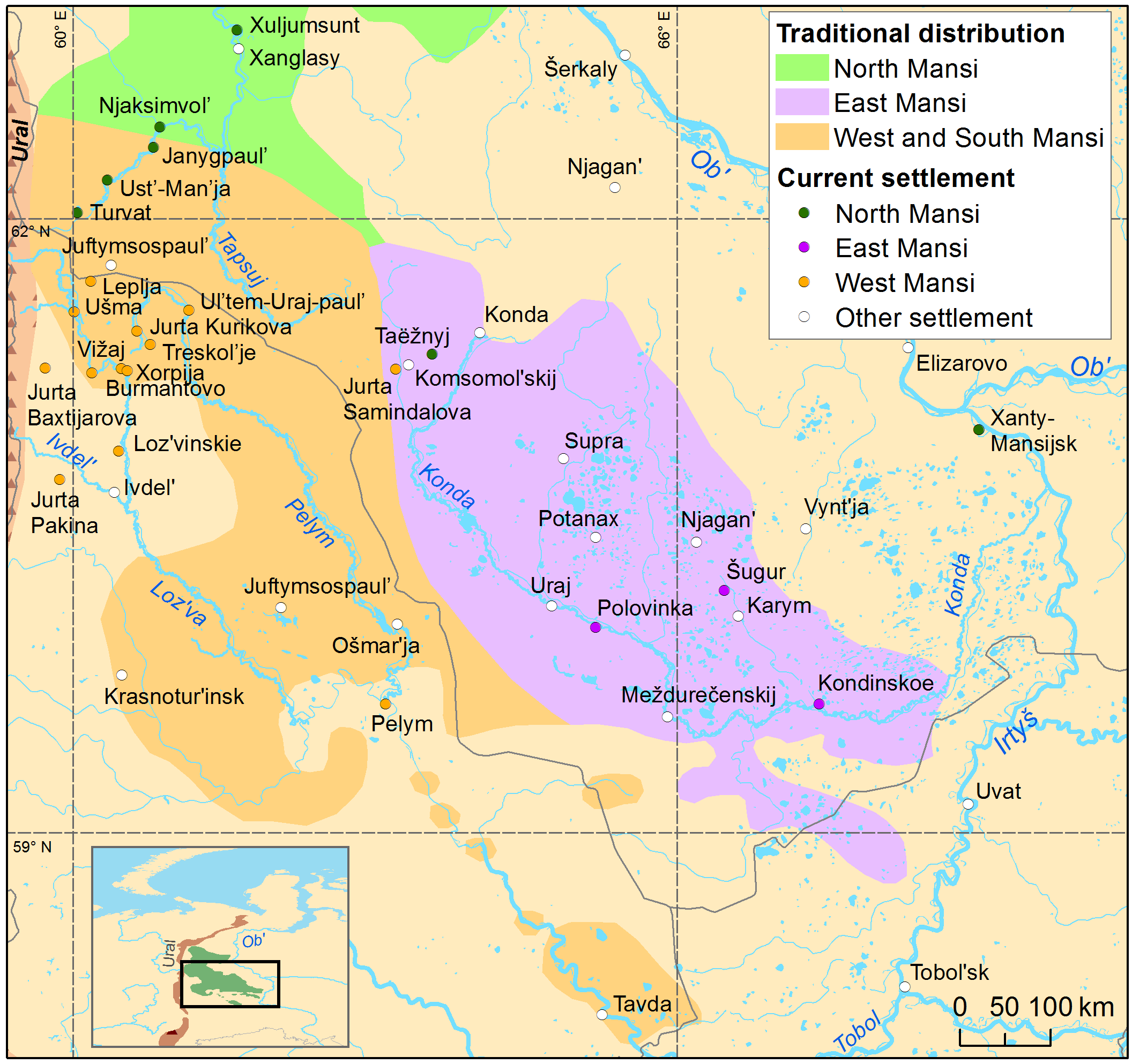
- Traditional distribution and current Mansi settlements

- Eastern Mansi is classified as Extinct according to The Uralic Languages (2023)

Eastern or Konda Mansi is an extinct member of the Mansi languages, and was spoken in Russia in the Khanty–Mansi Autonomous Okrug around the river Konda. It became extinct in 2018, when its last speaker Maksim Shivtorov (Максим Семенович Шивторов) died. It has Khanty and Siberian Tatar influence. There is vowel harmony, and for */æː/ it has [œː], frequently diphthongized.

In Russian linguistics, the Konda dialect used to be called the "southern Mansi (Kondinsky) dialect" (Russian: южно-мансийский (кондинский) диалект) or "eastern Mansi dialect group" (Russian: восточная группа диалектов).

== Dialects ==
- Lower Konda Mansi
- Middle Konda Mansi
- Upper Konda Mansi
- Jukonda Mansi

== Phonology ==
=== Consonants ===
Eastern Mansi consonants
		Labial	Alveolar	(Alveolo-) Palatal	Velar	
		Labial	Alveolar	(Alveolo-) Palatal	plain	labialized
Nasals		/m/ м	/n/ н	/nʲ/ нь	/ŋ/^{1} нг^{3} ӈ	
Stops		/p/ п	/t/ т	/tʲ/ ть	/k/ к	/kʷ/ кв
Affricate				/sʲ/ сь		
Fricatives	voiceless		/s/ с	/sʲ/ сь	/x/^{2} х	/xʷ/^{2} хв
Fricatives	voiced				/ɣ/^{1} г	
Semivowels				/j/ й		/w/ в
Laterals			/l/ л	/lʲ/ ль		
Trill			/r/ р			

Some remarks:

1. Neither in Middle nor Lower Konda do these appear at the beginning of words.
2. In Middle Konda it does not appear in the beginning of words, but in Lower Konda it does.
3. /ŋ/ is also spelled with just н if it comes before к or х. This rule does not include suffixes; like in мынгым /mənɣəm/

=== Vowels ===
Eastern Mansi vowels
	Front		Central	Back
	unrounded	rounded	Central	Back
Close	i ^{K 1} (и, ӣ, ы, ы̄)	y, yː ^{K 3} (ӱ, ӱ̄)		u, uː ^{K 3} (у, ӯ) (ю, ю̄)
Close-mid			ɘ, ɘː ^{KM} (ә, ә̄)	o, oː ^{K 3} (о, о̄) (ё, ё̄)
Mid	e ~ i eː^{K 2 3} (э, э̄) (е, е̄)	ø ^{K} (ӧ)	(ə) ^{K} (ы)	
Near-open	æ, æː ^{K} (ӓ, ӓ̄)			
Open	a, aː ^{K 4} (а, а̄) (я, я̄)			ɒ ~ ɑ ^{K} (а̊ , а̊̄)

(KM=Present in Middle Konda | KU=Present in Lower Konda | K=Present in both)

Some remarks:

1. Only present in palatal environments.
2. It has the allophone /iː/.
3. Neither in Middle nor Lower Konda do these appear in non-initial syllable positions.
4. Neither in Middle nor Lower Konda do /aː/ appear in first syllable positions.

==== Diphthongs ====
In Middle Konda, the diphthongs are /øæ/ or /øæ̯/ and /oɒ/ found in both first and non-initial syllable positions.

In Lower Konda, the /æø/ diphthong is usually realized as [œ] which is only found in first syllable positions, while /øæ/ is found in both first and non-initial syllable positions.

== Alphabet ==
In the few instances that Eastern Mansi literature was printed and was from the native areas, it used an unchanged Russian-Cyrillic script like this:

The highlighted letters are found in loanwords, except нг which represents a single nasal consonant and г is substituted with the letter й in some dialects.

А а	Б б	В в	Г г	Д д	Е е	Ё ё
Ж ж	З з	И и	Й й	К к	Л л	М м
Н н	Нг нг	О о	П п	Р р	С с	Т т
У у	Ф ф	Х х	Ц ц	Ч ч	Ш ш	Щ щ
Ъ ъ	Ы ы	Ь ь	Э э	Ю ю	Я я

The Yukonda dialect had a specialized alphabet, found in E. A. Kuzakova's book:

А а	А̄ а̄	Ӓ ӓ	Ӓ̄ ӓ̄	А̊ а̊	А̊̄ а̊̄	Б б	В в	Г г	Д д
Е е	Е̄ е̄	Ё ё	Ё̄ ё̄	Ж ж	З з	И и	Ӣ ӣ	Й й	К к
Л л	Л̆ л̆	М м	Н н	Ӈ ӈ	О о	О̄ о̄	Ӧ ӧ	П п	Р р
С с	Т т	У у	Ӯ ӯ	Ӱ ӱ	Ӱ̄ ӱ̄	У̊ у̊	Ф ф	Х х	Ц ц
Ч ч	Ш ш	Щ щ	ъ	ы	ь	Э э	Э̄ э̄	Ю ю	Ю̄ ю̄
Я я	Я̄ я̄
(Ю̈ ю̈	Ю̈̄ ю̈̄	Ю̊ ю̊	Я̈ я̈	Я̈̄ я̈̄	Я̊ я̊	Я̊̄ я̊̄)

== Sources ==
- Ромбандеева, Е. И. (1976). "Мансийский язык". Основы финно-угорского языкознания. Марийский, пермский и угорские языки (in Russian). Москва: Наука. pp. 229–239.
- Forsberg, Ulla-Maija (2007). Eastern Mansi (Konda) grammar (PDF). Helsinki: Société Finno-Ougrienne.
- E. A. Kuzakova (1994). Словарь манси (восточный диалект) [Mansi dictionary (eastern dialect)]. Moskwa: Российская академия наук, Ин-т этнологии и антропологии им. Миклухо-Маклая.
