= Northern Mansi =

Uralic language spoken in Russia

- ма̄ньси ла̄тыӈ, ма̄ньщи ла̄тыӈ mānʹsʹi lātyň
- Pronunciation: [maːnʲɕi laːtəŋ]
- Native to: Russia
- Region: Khanty–Mansi, Sverdlovsk
- Native speakers: All: 2,200; Daily users: ~900 (2021)
- Language family: Uralic: Finno-Ugric?; Ugric?; Ob-Ugric?; Mansi; Core; Northern Mansi
- Dialects: Severnaya Sosva; Sygva; Upper Lozva; Ob
- Writing system: Cyrillic (Mansi alphabet)

Official status
- Regulated by: Ob-Ugric Institute of Applied Science and Development

Language codes
- ISO 639-3: mns (all Mansi varieties)
- Glottolog: mans1258
- ELP: Northern Mansi
- Map of regions where those who speak the extant Northern Mansi language.(2020/21); 65%-75% 15%-35%

- Northern Mansi is classified as Severely Endangered by the UNESCO Atlas of the World's Languages in Danger (2010)

Northern Mansi (ма̄ньси ла̄тыӈ, pronounced [maːnʲɕi laːtəŋ]) is the sole surviving member of the Mansi languages, spoken in Russia in the Khanty–Mansi Autonomous Okrug and Sverdlovsk Oblast.

Northern Mansi has strong Russian, Komi, Nenets, and Northern Khanty influence, and is the literary Mansi language. There is no accusative case; that is, both the nominative and accusative roles are unmarked on the noun.

This article focuses on the Severnaya Sosva dialect of Northern Mansi, considered the literary language.

== Dialects ==
Dialects are named after the rivers their speakers originally lived next to. Mutual intelligibility between dialects can vary.

- Sosva/Severnaya Sosva (on the Northern Sosva river)
- Sygva (on the Sygva river)
- Upper Lozva (on the Lozva river)
- Ob (on or near the Khanty-Mansi part of the Ob river; sub-dialectal differentiation in upper, middle, lower Ob dialects)

The Upper Lozva dialect was restricted to the upper course of the river around the turn of the 20th century, but following migrations of reindeer-herding families southward in the 1930s, today extends along the whole river basin down to the vicinity of Ivdel, while the Lower Lozva dialect of Western Mansi earlier spoken there has become extinct. In this region Northern Mansi continues to be actively learned by children.

=== Differences ===
The main differences between dialects are phonetic, though vocabulary differences also occur. Grammar is usually universal across the Northern Mansi varieties.

- The infinitive verb ending is -ӈкве at Sosva, -ӈкв at Upper Lozva.
- /ɣ/ г becomes /j/ й at Upper Lozva.
- /k/ к before the front vowels /e/ or /i/ is palatalized to /tʲ/ т + и/е at Sygva, resulting in e.g. тит 'two' for literary кит.
- /kʷ/ кв becomes /k/ before front vowels at Sygva, and in general at Ivdel and at the Ob.

Minor differences exist also in orthography:

- сь is preferred at Sosva for the [ɕ] sound, щ at Upper Lozva, щь at Ivdel.

=== Examples ===
- Sosva: "Ханисьтан хум ханисьтаӈкве ха̄сыс, ханисьтахтын ня̄врам ханисьтахтуӈкве ат таӈхыс." — "A teacher could teach, but a student couldn’t study."
- Upper Lozva: "А̄йирищум иӈ ма̄нь, но̄х-яныймаӈкв ат паты" - "My daughter is still small, she won't grow up."

== Phonology ==
=== Consonants ===
Sosva Northern Mansi consonants
	Labial	Alveolar	(Alveolo-) Palatal	Velar	
	Labial	Alveolar	(Alveolo-) Palatal	Plain	Labialized
Nasals	/m/ ⟨м⟩	/n/ ⟨н⟩	/nʲ/ ⟨нь⟩	/ŋ/ ⟨ӈ⟩	
Stops	/p/ ⟨п⟩	/t/ ⟨т⟩	/tʲ/ ⟨ть⟩	/k/ ⟨к⟩	/kʷ/ ⟨кв⟩
Fricatives		/s/ ⟨с⟩	/ɕ/ ^{[1]} ~ /sʲ/ ⟨щ⟩ ~ ⟨сь⟩	/x/ /ɣ/ ⟨х⟩ ⟨г⟩	
Semivowels			/j/ ⟨й⟩		/w/ ⟨в⟩
Laterals		/l/ ⟨л⟩	/lʲ/ ⟨ль⟩		
Trill		/r/ ⟨р⟩			

1. /ɕ/ is an allophone of /sʲ/.

The Ob dialect preserves Proto-Mansi *š /ʃ/ and has adopted, from the Ob dialects of Northern Khanty, the lateral fricatives /ɬ/ and /ɬʲ/ in place of /l/ and /lʲ/. The Ob and Ivdel dialects lack /kʷ/; the latter also uses [kʲ] for /tʲ/.

=== Vowels ===
Northern Mansi has a largely symmetric system of 8 vowels, though lacking short **/e/ and having a very rare long [iː]:

Northern Mansi stressed vowels
	Unrounded	Rounded
Close	/i/ ^{1}, ([iː] ^{2}) ⟨ы/и⟩	/u/, /uː/ ⟨у/ю⟩
Mid	/eː/^{3} ⟨э/е⟩	/o/, /oː/ ^{3}⟨о/ё⟩
Open	/a/, /aː/ ⟨а/я⟩	

Northern Mansi unstressed vowels
	Full	Reduced
Close	/i/ ^{1}, (/u/ ^{4}) ⟨ы/и⟩, ⟨у⟩	
Mid	/e/ ⟨э/е⟩	/ə/ ^{5}
Open	/a/ ⟨а/я⟩	

Remarks:

1. ы/и /i/ has a velar allophone [ɨ] before г /ɣ/ and after х /x/.
2. Long [iː] occurs as a rare and archaic phonetic variant of /eː/, cf. э̄ти ~ ӣти (‘in the evening, evenings’)
3. Long /eː/ and /oː/ can be pronounced as diphthongs [e͜ɛ] and [o͜ɔ].
4. у /u/ is found in unstressed (“non-first”) syllables before в /w/, in the infinitive suffix -ункве /uŋkʷe/ and in obscured compound words.
5. Reduced /ə/ becomes labialized [ə̹] or [ɞ̯] before bilabial consonants м /m/ and п /p/.

Unlike other recorded Mansi varieties, there are no front open vowels /æ/, /æː/; Proto-Mansi *ä and *ǟ have generally developed to /a/, /aː/. Vowel harmony has been likewise lost.

== Alphabet ==
The highlighted letters, and Г with the value /ɡ/, are used only in names and loanwords. The allophones /ɕ/ and /sʲ/ are written with the letter Щ or the digraph СЬ respectively.

А а	А̄ а̄	Б б	В в	Г г	Д д	Е е	Е̄ е̄	Ё ё	Ё̄ ё̄	Ж ж
З з	И и	Ӣ ӣ	Й й	К к	Л л	М м	Н н	Ӈ ӈ	О о	О̄ о̄
П п	Р р	С с	Т т	У у	Ӯ ӯ	Ф ф	Х х	Ц ц	Ч ч	Ш ш
Щ щ	Ъ ъ	Ы ы	Ы̄ ы̄	Ь ь	Э э	Э̄ э̄	Ю ю	Ю̄ ю̄	Я я	Я̄ я̄

== Grammar ==
Northern Mansi is an agglutinating, subject–object–verb (SOV) language.

=== Article ===
One way to express a noun's definiteness in a sentence is with articles, and Northern Mansi uses two articles. The Indefinite is derived from the demonstrative pronominal word ань ('now'), the definite is derived from the number аква/акв ('one'); ань ('the'), акв ('a/an'). They both are used before the defined word. And if their adverbial and numeral meanings are to be expressed; ань always stands before the verb or a word with a similar function and is usually stressed, акв behaves the same and is always stressed.

It's worth noting that the Northern Mansi newspaper, Lūimā sēripos (Лӯима̄ сэ̄рипос), doesn't use the before-mentioned words as articles.

Definiteness (determination) can also be expressed by the third (less often second) person singular possession marker, or in case of direct objects, using transitive conjugation. E.g. а̄мп (’dog’) → а̄мпе (’his/her/its dog’, ’the dog’); ха̄п (’boat’) → ха̄п на̄лув-нарыгтас (’he/she pushed a boat in the water’) ≠ ха̄п на̄лув-нарыгтастэ (’he/she pushed the boat in the water’).

=== Nouns ===
There is no grammatical gender. Mansi distinguishes between singular, dual and plural number. Six grammatical cases exist. Possession is expressed using possessive suffixes, for example -ум, which means "my".

==== Grammatical cases, declining ====
There are 5 ways the case suffix can change.

If the word last letter is a consonant; Example with: **пӯт** /puːt/ (cauldron)
case	sing.	dual	plural
nom.	**пӯт** puːt	**пӯтыг** puːtɪɣ	**пӯтыт** puːtət
loc.	**пӯтт** puːtt	**пӯтыгт** puːtɪɣt	**пӯтытт** puːtətt
lat.	**пӯтн** puːtn	**пӯтыгн** puːtɪɣn	**пӯтытн** puːtətn
abl.	**пӯтныл** puːtnəl	**пӯтыгныл** puːtɪɣnəl	**пӯтытныл** puːtətnəl
trans.	**пӯтыг** puːtɪɣ	-	-
instr.	**пӯтыл** puːtəl	**пӯтыгтыл** puːtɪɣtəl	**пӯтытыл** puːtətəl

If the word last letter is a vowel; Example with: **э̄ква** /eːkʷa/ (wife)
case	sing.	dual	plural
nom.	**э̄ква** eːkʷa	**э̄кваг** eːkʷaɣ	**э̄кват** eːkʷat
loc.	**э̄кват** eːkʷat	**э̄квагт** eːkʷaɣt	**э̄кватт** eːkʷatt
lat.	**э̄кван** eːkʷan	**э̄квагн** eːkʷaɣn	**э̄кватн** eːkʷatn
abl.	**э̄кваныл** eːkʷanəl	**э̄квагныл** eːkʷaɣnəl	**э̄кватныл** eːkʷatnəl
trans.	**э̄кваг** eːkʷaɣ	-	-
instr.	**э̄квал** eːkʷal	**э̄квагтыл** eːkʷaɣtəl	**э̄кватыл** eːkʷatəl

If the word has a vowel (**ы, и**) as the last letter; Example with: **са̄лы** /saːli/ (deer)
case	sing.	dual	plural
nom.	**са̄лы** saːli	**са̄лыйиг** saːlijiɣ	**са̄лыт** eːkʷat
loc.	**са̄лыт** saːlit	**са̄лыйигт** saːlijiɣt	**са̄лытт** saːlitt
lat.	**са̄лын** saːlin	**са̄лыйигн** saːlijiɣn	**са̄лытн** saːlitn
abl.	**са̄лыныл** saːlinəl	**са̄лыйигныл** saːlijiɣnəl	**са̄лытныл** saːlitnəl
trans.	**са̄лыйиг** saːlijiɣ	-	-
instr.	**са̄лыл** saːlil	**са̄лыйигтыл** saːlijiɣtəl	**са̄лытыл** saːlitəl

If the word last letter is a palatalized con.; Example with: **ся̄нь** /ɕaːnʲ/ (mother)
case	sing.	dual	plural
nom.	**ся̄нь** ɕaːnʲ	**ся̄ньыг** ɕaːnʲɪɣ	**ся̄ньыт** ɕaːnʲət
loc.	**ся̄ньт** ɕaːnʲt	**ся̄ньыгт** ɕaːnʲɪɣt	**ся̄ньытт** ɕaːnʲətt
lat.	**ся̄ньн** ɕaːnʲn	**ся̄ньыгн** ɕaːnʲɪɣn	**ся̄ньытн** ɕaːnʲətn
abl.	**ся̄ньныл** ɕaːnʲnəl	**ся̄ньыгныл** ɕaːnʲɪɣnəl	**ся̄ньытныл** ɕaːnʲətnəl
trans.	**ся̄ниг** ɕaːnʲiɣ	-	-
instr.	**ся̄нил** ɕaːnʲil	**ся̄ньыгтыл** ɕaːnʲɪɣtəl	**ся̄ньытыл** ɕaːnʲətəl

If the word has a syncopating stem; Example with: **сасыг** /sasɪɣ/ (uncle)
case	sing.	dual	plural
nom.	**сасыг** sasɪɣ	**сасгыг** sasɣɪɣ	**сасгыт** sasɣət
loc.	**сасыгт** sasɪɣt	**сасгыгт** sasɣɪɣt	**сасгытт** sasɣətt
lat.	**сасыгн** sasɪɣn	**сасгыгн** sasɣɪɣn	**сасгытн** sasɣətn
abl.	**сасыгныл** sasɪɣnəl	**сасгыгныл** sasɣɪɣnəl	**сасгытныл** sasɣətnəl
trans.	**сасгыг** sasɣɪɣ	-	-
instr.	**сасгыл** sasɣəl	**сасгыгтыл** sasɣɪɣtəl	**сасгытыл** sasɣətəl

Missing cases can be expressed using postpositions, such as халныл (χalnəl, 'of, out of'), саит (sait, 'after, behind'), etc.

==== Possession ====
Possession is expressed with possessive suffixes, and the suffix change is determined by the last letter of a word. There are 5 ways that the suffixes can change:

If the word has a consonant as the last letter; Example with: **пӯт** /puːt/ (cauldron)
possessor	single	double	multiple
1st person sing.	**пӯтум** puːtɞ̯m	**пӯтагум** puːtaɣɞ̯m	**пӯтанум** puːtanɞ̯m
2nd person sing.	**пӯтын** puːtən	**пӯтагын** puːtaɣən	**пӯтан** puːtan
3rd person sing.	**пӯтэ** puːte	**пӯтаге** puːtaɣe	**пӯтанэ** puːtane
1st person dual	**пӯтме̄н** puːtmeːn	**пӯтагаме̄н** puːtaɣameːn	**пӯтанаме̄н** puːtanameːn
2nd person dual	**пӯты̄н** puːtiːn	**пӯтагы̄н** puːtaɣiːn	**пӯтаны̄н** puːtaniːn
3rd person dual	**пӯтэ̄** puːteː	**пӯтаге̄н** puːtaɣeː	**пӯтанэ̄н** puːtaneː
1st person plu.	**пӯтув** puːtuw	**пӯтагув** puːtaɣuw	**пӯтанув** puːtanuw
2nd person plu.	**пӯты̄н** puːtiːn	**пӯтагы̄н** puːtaɣiːn	**пӯтаны̄н** puːtaniːn
3rd person plu.	**пӯтаныл** puːtanəl	**пӯтага̄ныл** puːtanəl	**пӯта̄ныл** puːtanəl

If the word has a vowel as the last letter; Example with: **э̄ква** /eːkʷa/ (wife, older woman)
possessor	single	double	multiple
1st person sing.	**э̄квам** eːkʷam	**э̄квагум** eːkʷaɣɞ̯m	**э̄кванум** eːkʷanɞ̯m
2nd person sing.	**э̄кван** eːkʷan	**э̄квагын** eːkʷaɣən	**э̄кван** eːkʷan
3rd person sing.	**э̄кватэ** eːkʷate	**э̄кваге** eːkʷaɣe	**э̄кванэ** eːkʷane
1st person dual	**э̄кваме̄н** eːkʷameːn	**э̄квагаме̄н** eːkʷaɣameːn	**э̄кванаме̄н** eːkʷanameːn
2nd person dual	**э̄кван** eːkʷan	**э̄квагы̄н** eːkʷaɣiːn	**э̄кваны̄н** eːkʷaniːn
3rd person dual	**э̄кватэ̄н** eːkʷateːn	**э̄кваге̄н** eːkʷaɣeː	**э̄кванэ̄н** eːkʷaneː
1st person plu.	**э̄квав** eːkʷaw	**э̄квагув** eːkʷaɣuw	**э̄кванув** eːkʷanuw
2nd person plu.	**э̄кван** eːkʷan	**э̄квагы̄н** eːkʷaɣiːn	**э̄кваны̄н** eːkʷaniːn
3rd person plu.	**э̄кваныл** eːkʷanəl	**э̄кваганыл** eːkʷanəl	**э̄квананыл** eːkʷanəl

If the word has a vowel (**ы, и**) as the last letter; Example with: **са̄лы** /saːli/ (deer)
possessor	single	double	multiple
1st person sing.	**са̄лым** saːlim	**са̄лыягум** saːlijaɣɞ̯m	**са̄лыянум** saːlijanɞ̯m
2nd person sing.	**са̄лын** saːlin	**са̄лыягын** saːlijaɣən	**са̄лыян** saːlijan
3rd person sing.	**са̄лытэ** saːlite	**са̄лыяге** saːlijaɣe	**са̄лыянэ** saːlijane
1st person dual	**са̄лыме̄н** saːlimeːn	**са̄лыягаме̄н** saːlijaɣameːn	**са̄лыянаме̄н** saːlijanameːn
2nd person dual	**са̄лын** saːlin	**са̄лыягы̄н** saːlijaɣiːn	**са̄лыяны̄н** saːlijaniːn
3rd person dual	**са̄лытэ̄н** saːliteː	**са̄лыяге̄н** saːlijaɣeː	**са̄лыянэ̄н** saːlijaneː
1st person plu.	**са̄лыюв** saːlijuw	**са̄лыягув** saːlijaɣuw	**са̄лыянув** saːlijanuw
2nd person plu.	**са̄лын** saːlin	**са̄лыягы̄н** saːlijaɣiːn	**са̄лыяны̄н** saːlijaniːn
3rd person plu.	**са̄лыяныл** saːlijanəl	**са̄лыяганыл** saːlijaɣanəl	**са̄лыянаныл** saːlijananəl

If the word has a palatalized consonant as the last letter; Example with: **ся̄нь** /ɕaːnʲ/ (mother)
possessor	single	double	multiple
1st person sing.	**ся̄нюм** ɕaːnʲɞ̯m	**ся̄нягум** ɕaːnʲaɣɞ̯m	**ся̄нянум** ɕaːnʲanɞ̯m
2nd person sing.	**ся̄нин** ɕaːnʲən	**ся̄нягын** ɕaːnʲaɣən	**ся̄нян** ɕaːnʲan
3rd person sing.	**ся̄не** ɕaːnʲe	**ся̄няге** ɕaːnʲaɣe	**ся̄нянэ** ɕaːnʲane
1st person dual	**ся̄няме̄н** ɕaːnʲameːn	**ся̄нягаме̄н** ɕaːnʲaɣameːn	**ся̄нянаме̄н** ɕaːnʲanameːn
2nd person dual	**ся̄нӣн** ɕaːnʲiːn	**ся̄нягы̄н** ɕaːnʲaɣiːn	**ся̄няны̄н** ɕaːnʲaniːn
3rd person dual	**ся̄не̄** ɕaːnʲeː	**ся̄няге̄н** ɕaːnʲaɣeː	**ся̄нянэ̄н** ɕaːnʲaneː
1st person plu.	**ся̄нюв** ɕaːnʲuw	**ся̄нягув** ɕaːnʲaɣuw	**ся̄нянув** ɕaːnʲanuw
2nd person plu.	**ся̄нӣн** ɕaːnʲiːn	**ся̄нягы̄н** ɕaːnʲaɣiːn	**ся̄няны̄н** ɕaːnʲaniːn
3rd person plu.	**ся̄няныл** ɕaːnʲanəl	**ся̄няга̄ныл** ɕaːnʲanəl	**ся̄ня̄ныл** ɕaːnʲanəl

If the word has a syncopating stem; Example with: **сасыг** /sasɪɣ/ (uncle)
possessor	single	double	multiple
1st person sing.	**сасгум** sasɣɞ̯m	**сасгагум** sasɣaɣɞ̯m	**сасганум** sasɣanɞ̯m
2nd person sing.	**сасгын** sasɣən	**сасгагын** sasɣaɣən	**сасган** sasɣan
3rd person sing.	**сасгэ** sasɣe	**сасгаге** sasɣaɣe	**сасганэ** sasɣane
1st person dual	**сасыгме̄н** sasɪɣmeːn	**сасгагаме̄н** sasɣaɣameːn	**сасганаме̄н** sasɣanameːn
2nd person dual	**сасгы̄н** sasɣiːn	**сасгагы̄н** sasɣaɣiːn	**сасганы̄н** sasɣaniːn
3rd person dual	**сасгэ̄** sasɣeː	**сасгаге̄н** sasɣaɣeː	**сасганэ̄н** sasɣaneː
1st person plu.	**сасгув** sasɣuw	**сасгагув** sasɣaɣuw	**сасганув** sasɣanuw
2nd person plu.	**сасгы̄н** sasɣiːn	**сасгагы̄н** sasɣaɣiːn	**сасганы̄н** sasɣaniːn
3rd person plu.	**сасганыл** sasɣanəl	**сасгага̄ныл** sasɣaɣaːnəl	**сасга̄ныл** sasɣanəl

=== Verbs ===
Northern Mansi conjugation has three persons, three numbers, two tenses, and five moods. Active and passive voices exist.

There is no clear distinction between transitive and intransitive verbs.

The verb can conjugate in a Definite and Indefinite way which depends on if the sentence has an object, which the action depicted by the verb refers to directly.

==== Personal suffixes ====
Personal suffixes are attached after the verbal marker. The suffixes are the following:

	Singular	Dual	Plural
1st person	-ум	-ме̄н	-в
2nd person	-ын	-ы̄н	-ы̄н
3rd person	-ø	-ø	-ыт

==== Tenses ====
Tenses are formed with suffixes except for the future.

===== Present tense =====
The tense suffix precedes the personal suffix. The form of the present tense suffix depends on the character of the verbal stem, as well as moods. Tense conjugation is formed with the suffixes -эг, -э̄г, -и, -э, -э̄, -г, or -в. In the following examples, the tense suffix is in bold and the personal ending is in italic.

рӯпитаӈкве - to work
	Singular	Dual	Plural
1st person	рӯпит**э̄г**ум	рӯпит**ы**ме̄н	рӯпит**э̄**в
2nd person	рӯпит**э̄г**ын	рӯпит**эг**ы̄н	рӯпит**эг**ы̄н
3rd person	рӯпит**ы**	рӯпит**э̄г**	рӯпит**э̄г**ыт

The present tense suffix -э̄г is used if the following personal marker contains a consonant or a highly reduced vowel; the suffix -эг is used if the following personal marker has a stronger vowel, as it is the case in 2nd person dual and plural. 1st person dual has no tense marker but rather a ы between the verb stem and personal ending.

Verb stems that end in a vowel, have -г as verbal marker. Verb stems that end with the vowel у have -в as verbal marker.

3rd person dual has no personal ending. If the verbal stem ends in a vowel, the tense suffix becomes -ыг.

1st person plural personal ending is -в if the verbal stems ends in a consonant; the personal ending becomes -ув if the verbal stem ends in a vowel.

===== Past tense =====
The past tense suffix if the verb stem is monosylabalic is -ыс- and if the verb is polysyllabic it is -ас-:

Сяр ма̄ньлат каснэ хум Евгений Глызин **о̄лыс**.	The youngest participant in the competition **was** Jevgeni Glizin.
Ёська мо̄лхо̄тал урт **рӯпитас**.	Joseph **worked** at the mountain yesterday.

рӯпитаӈкве - to work
	Singular	Dual	Plural
1st person	рӯпит**ас**ум	рӯпит**аса**ме̄н	рӯпит**ас**ув
2nd person	рӯпит**ас**ын	рӯпит**ас**ы̄н	рӯпит**ас**ы̄н
3rd person	рӯпит**ас**	рӯпит**ас**ы̄г	рӯпит**а̄с**ыт

3rd person dual in past tense has a -ы̄г personal ending.

The 1st person plural personal suffix turns into -ув.

===== Future "tense" =====
To represent the Future, the verb патуӈкве (not dissimilar to Hungarian use of the verb fogni) is used as an auxiliary verb conjugated in the Present Indicative:

Тав кӯтювытыл рӯпитаӈкве **паты**.	He **will** work with (female) dogs.

==== Definiteness ====
Verbs can conjugate two ways to show agreement with the sentence's object.

===== Indefinite conjugation =====
In Indefinite verb conjugations, no object is present. Any suffix does not represent it.

===== Definite conjugation =====
In Definite verb conjugations there are three ways the verb can represent the direct object's number.

рӯпитаӈкве - to work
Singular Object	Singular	Dual	Plural
1st person	рӯпит**ыл**ум	рӯпит**ыл**амēн	рӯпит**ыл**ув
2nd person	рӯпит**ыл**ын	рӯпит**ыл**ы̄н	рӯпит**ыл**ы̄н
3rd person	рӯпит**ы**тэ	рӯпит**ы**тэ̄н	рӯпит**ыя**ныл

The singular object is expressed with the -ыл- suffix which changes depending on the mood and tense.

рӯпитаӈкве - to work
Dual Object	Singular	Dual	Plural
1st person	рӯпит**ыяг**ум	рӯпит**ыяг**мēн	рӯпит**ыяг**ув
2nd person	рӯпит**ыяг**ын	рӯпит**ыяг**ы̄н	рӯпит**ыяг**ы̄н
3rd person	рӯпит**ыяг**е	рӯпит**ыяг**ēн	рӯпит**ыяга̄**ныл

The dual object is expressed with the -ыяг- suffix which changes depending on the mood and tense.

рӯпитаӈкве - to work
Plural Object	Singular	Dual	Plural
1st person	рӯпит**ыян**ум	рӯпит**ыян**мēн	рӯпит**ыян**ув
2nd person	рӯпит**ыян**ын or рӯпит**ыян**	рӯпит**ыян**ы̄н or рӯпит**ыян**	рӯпит**ыян**ы̄н or рӯпит**ыян**
3rd person	рӯпит**ыян**э	рӯпит**ыян**анэ̄н or рӯпит**ыя**нэ̄н	рӯпит**ыяна̄**ныл or рӯпит**ыя̄**ныл

The plural object is expressed with the -ыян- suffix which changes depending on the mood and tense.

==== Moods ====
There are four moods: indicative, mirative, optative, imperative and conditional.

Indicative mood has no suffix. Imperative mood exists only in the second person. Optative and Imperative don't have tenses.

===== Mirative mood =====
Is a mood presented in the present indefinite by the -не suffix and by the -но in definite.

In the past tense it is represented by the -ам suffix, both in indefinite and definite.

===== Optative mood =====
The mood is represented by the -нӯв and -нув suffixes, determined by the vowel in the next suffix.

===== Imperative mood =====
It exists only in the second person, and in indefinite conjugation, it doesn't show any personal markers, and it is represented by the -эн and -э̄н suffixes.

==== Active/Passive voice ====
Verbs have active and passive voice. Active voice has no suffix; the suffix to express the passive is -ве-.

==== Verbal prefixes ====
Verbal prefixes are used to modify the meaning of the verb in both concrete and abstract ways.

э̄л – 'away'

**лаквуӈкве** 'to move'	**э̄л-лаквуӈкве** 'to move away'

юв – 'back'

**минуӈкве** 'to go'	**юв-минуӈкве** 'to go back'

хот – 'direction away from something and other nuances of action intensity'

**та̄ртаӈкве** 'to let, to allow'	**хот-та̄ртаӈкве** 'to let go'
**патуӈкве** 'to fall'	**хот-патуӈкве** 'to fall away'

== Vocabulary ==
The vocabulary of the Mansi languages is distinguished by a fairly large number of forms for denoting concepts related to hunting, reindeer husbandry, fishing (the main traditional occupations of the Mansi). For example, there are about seven words are used to define different types of swamps. At the same time, the language almost lacks its socio-political vocabulary. To denote such concepts that appeared in the life of Mansi in the 20th century; compounding, derivation (rarely affixation), and or borrowings were used. For example, "hospital" can be described by a borrowing пӯльница and derivation пусмалтан кол literally "medicinal/curative house".

Words from extinct dialects could also be revitalized in the literary language

=== Noteworthy lexical items ===
==== Kinship terms ====
Northern Mansi differentiates between relatives based on from which side of the family they came from and also their relative age, for example:

	maternal	paternal
grandmother	ане̄ква	сясе̄ква
grandfather	асёйка	о̄па

	maternal younger	maternal older	paternal younger	paternal older
uncle	сасыг		аки	каӈк
aunt	ный	акв	ӯвси	акв

Siblings are similarly differentiated to Hungarian and other Uralic languages:

	younger	elder	unspecified
sister	э̄сь	ӯвси	яга̄ги
brother	а̄пси/кась	каӈк	ягпыг

=== Examples ===
==== Numbers ====
Basic numerals
#	Northern Sosva Mansi	Hungarian
1	аква (akʷa)	egy
2	китыг (kitiɣ)	kettő
3	хӯрум (xuːrəm)	három
4	нила / нӣла (nʲila / nʲiːla)	négy
5	ат (at)	öt
6	хо̄т (xoːt)	hat
7	са̄т / ма̄нь са̄т (saːt / maːnʲ saːt)	hét
8	нёлолов (nʲololow)	nyolc
9	онтолов (ontolow)	(kilenc)
10	лов (low)	(tíz)
20	хус (xus)	húsz
30	ва̄т (wāt)	(harminc)
100	са̄т / яныгса̄т (saːt / janiɣsaːt)	száz
1000	со̄тыр / со̄тыра (soːtər / soːtəra)	ezer

Numbers 1 and 2 also have attributive forms: акв (1) and кит (2); compare with Hungarian két, Old Hungarian kit.

ма̄нь, meaning 'small', and яныг, meaning 'big', before 7 and 100 differentiate between the two, if both are in the same number or sentence.

Numbers between ten and twenty
#	Northern Sosva Mansi
11	аквхуйплов (akʷxujplow)
15	атхуйплов (atxujplow)
19	онтоловхуйплов (ontolowxujplow)

The Mansi numbering system is different in this range than after twenty. These number are formed with the word хуйп (above, more than). Therefore, аквхуйплов means "one over/above ten", in a similar way to other Uralic languages.

Numbers above twenty
#	Northern Sosva Mansi
21	ва̄т нупыл аква (waːt nupəl akʷa)
31	налыман нупыл аква (naliman nupəl akʷa)
41	атпан нупыл аква (atpan nupəl akʷa)
51	хо̄тпан нупыл аква (xoːtpan nupəl akʷa)
61	са̄тлов нупыл аква (saːtlow nupəl akʷa)
71	нёлса̄т нупыл аква (nʲolsaːt nupəl akʷa)
81	онтырса̄т нупыл аква (ontərsaːt nupəl akʷa)

Numbering in this range uses the word нупыл (towards). therefore, ва̄т нупыл аква means "Towards thirty with one".

An exception are the Ob dialects, where the postposition нупыл isn't used;

#	Ob Mansi
21	ва̄тн аква (waːtn akʷa)
31	налыманн аква (nalimann akʷa)
41	атпанн аква (atpann akʷa)
51	хо̄тпанн аква (xoːtpann akʷa)
61	са̄тловн аква (saːtlown akʷa)
71	нёлса̄тн аква (nʲolsaːtn akʷa)
81	онтырса̄тн аква (ontərsaːtn akʷa)

Above 89, the postposition of нупыл isn't used;

Numbers above ninety
#	Northern Sosva Mansi
91	онтырса̄т аква (ontərsaːt akʷa)
95	онтырса̄т ат (ontərsaːt at)
99	онтырса̄т онтолов (ontərsaːt ontolow)

Numbers above hundred
#	Northern Sosva Mansi
101	яныгса̄т аква (janiɣsaːt akʷa)
111	яныгса̄т аквхуйплов (janiɣsaːt akʷxujplow)
121	яныгса̄т ва̄т нупыл аква (janiɣsaːt waːt nupəl akʷa)
201	китса̄т аква (xoːtpan akʷa)
301	хурмса̄т аква (xuːrəmsaːt akʷa)
991	онтоловса̄т онтырса̄т аква (ontolowsaːt ontərsaːt akʷa)

You just add the number after the biggest number;

In the Ob dialect, the word denoting the number that counts approaches is suffixed with the -н, similarly when counting from 21 to 89.

#	Ob Mansi
101	китса̄тн аква (kitsaːtn akʷa)
111	китса̄тн аквхуйплов (kitsaːtn akʷxujplow)
121	китса̄тн ва̄т нупыл аква (kitsaːtn waːt nupəl akʷa)
201	хӯрмса̄тн аква (xuːrəmsaːtn akʷa)
301	ниласа̄тн аква (nʲilasaːtn akʷa)
981	онтоловса̄т онтырса̄т нупыл аква (ontolowsaːt ontərsaːt nupəl akʷa)

Numerals above 100
#	Ob Mansi
101	китыт са̄тн аква (kitit saːtn akʷa)
111	китыт са̄тн аквхуйплов (kitit saːtn akʷxujplow)
121	китыт са̄тн ва̄т нупыл аква (kitit saːtn waːt nupəl akʷa)
201	хӯрмит са̄тн аква (xuːrəmit saːtn akʷa)
301	нилат са̄тн аква (nʲilat saːtn akʷa)

==== Sample vocabulary ====
Northern Mansi	English
Паща о̄лэн/Пася о̄лэн	Hello (to one person)
Паща о̄лэ̄н/Пася о̄лэ̄н	Hello (to multiple people)
Наӈ намын ма̄ныр?	What is your name?
Ам намум ___.	My name is ____.
Пӯмасипа!/Пӯмащипа!	Thank you
О̄с ёмас ӯлум	Goodbye
Ёмас ӯлум	Good night (Good dream)
нэ̄	woman
хум	man, person
ня̄врам	child
юрт, рума	friend
а̄щ/а̄сь	father
ща̄нь/ся̄нь	mother
пы̄г	boy
а̄ги	girl
кол	house
ӯс	city
ма̄	land
ха̄ль	birch tree
я̄	river
во̄р	forest
тӯр	lake
нэ̄пак	book
пасан	table
а̄мп, кӯтюв	dog
кати	cat
ӯй	animal
во̄рто̄лнут	bear
хӯл	fish

=== Conversation ===
Northern Mansi	English	Morphological translation
А̄кврись, а̄кврись, тучаӈын хо̄т? — А̄мпын тотвес. А̄мпе хо̄т? —Во̄рн минас. Во̄ре хо̄т? —На̄йн та̄йвес.	Dear auntie, dear auntie, where is your sewing kit? — It has been taken by the dog. Where is the dog? — It has gone to the forest. Where is the forest? — It has been burnt down by fire.	Auntie.dear, auntie.dear, sewing-kit.your where? — Dog.by taken.was.(it). Dog.its where? — Forest.into go.did.(it). Forest.its where? — Fire.by eaten.was.(it).

== Media ==
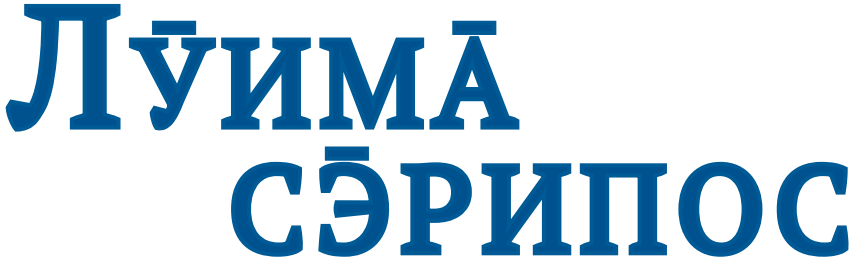
Logo of Lūimā sēripos newspaper

Since 1989, the Lūimā sēripos ("Northern dawn") newspaper has been the only and most prominent Mansi media. As of 2024 "Listen to articles", most articles on the site of the news agency, have their authors read the articles out loud, so people can not just read the news in their native language but listen to it as well. This initiative was taken as the UN declared 2022-2032 as the International Decade of Indigenous Languages.

"Scholars and linguists believe that the Khanty and Mansi languages are dying; we, in turn, are making attempts to preserve and promote our native languages. Thus, to learn languages, it will be convenient and interesting to listen to the live speech of native speakers"

said Галина Кондина (Galina Kondina) the head editor of the newsagency.

The Gospel of Mark in Northern Mansi is available online on Finugorbib site, audio recordings can also be found

== Sample text ==
=== Universal Declaration of Human Rights ===
Article 1 of the Universal Declaration of Human Rights in Northern Mansi:

Ма̄ янытыл о̄лнэ мир пуссын аквхольт самын патэ̄гыт, аквте̄м вос о̄лэ̄гыт, аквте̄м нё̄тмил вос кинсэ̄гыт. Та̄н пуӈк о̄ньщēгыт, номсуӈкве ве̄рме̄гыт, э̄сырма о̄ньщэ̄гыт, халанылт ягпыгыӈыщ-яга̄гиӈыщ вос о̄лэ̄гыт.

Mā ânytyl ōlnè mir pussyn akvholʹt samyn patè̄gyt, akvtēm vos ōlè̄gyt, akvtēm në̄tmil vos kinsè̄gyt. Tān puňk ōnʹsēgyt, nomsuňkve vērmēgyt, è̄syrma ōnʹsʹè̄gyt, halanylt âgpygyňysʹ-âgāgiňysʹ vos ōlè̄gyt.

Article 1 of the Universal Declaration of Human Rights in English:

All human beings are born free and equal in dignity and rights. They are endowed with reason and conscience and should act towards one another in a spirit of brotherhood.

=== Declaration on the Rights of Indigenous Peoples ===
Article 1 of the Declaration on the Rights of Indigenous Peoples in Northern Mansi:

Соссаӈ мирыт, акв хо̄тпа манос са̄в хо̄тпа пуссын аквъёт, сакконыт щирыл тэ̄ланыл та̄нти ва̄руӈкве ве̄рмияныл, та̄наныл вуянтан сакконыт Ма̄ янытыл о̄лнэ мирыт Акван-потыртахтам Мирколаныл Устав нэ̄пакт, Ма̄ янытыл о̄лнэ мир ма̄гыс хансым ма̄к потрыт ос мирхал сакконыт палт хансым о̄лэ̄гыт.

Sossaň miryt, akv hōtpa manos sāv hōtpa pussyn akvʺët, sakkonyt siryl tè̄lanyl tānti vāruňkve vērmiânyl, tānanyl vuântan sakkonyt Mā ânytyl ōlnè miryt Akvan-potyrtahtam Mirkolanyl Ustav nè̄pakt, Mā ânytyl ōlnè mir māgys hansym māk potryt os mirhal sakkonyt palt hansym ōlè̄gyt.

Article 1 of the Declaration on the Rights of Indigenous Peoples in English:

Indigenous peoples have the right to the full enjoyment, as a collective or as individuals, of all human rights and fundamental freedoms as recognized in the Charter of the United Nations, the Universal Declaration of Human Rights and international human rights law.
