= O with macron =

O with macron may refer to:

- O with macron (Latin)
- O with macron (Cyrillic)
