= Ulcha =

Ulcha may refer to:

- Ulcha language
- Ulch people
