= Ulch =

Ulch or ULCH may refer to:

- the Ulch people
- the Ulch language
- Ultra Low Cost Handset, a term used for some very simple mobile phones (see also: Feature phone)
