= Lūimā sēripos =

- Lūimā sēripos print edition on December 18, 2025
- Type: Biweekly newspaper
- Format: Broadsheet
- Owner(s): Roskomnadzor, Khanty Mansi Mir
- Founder(s): Maria Kuzminichna Voldina, Yuvan Shestalov, Claudia Afanasyeva
- Publisher: Department of Public and External Relations of the Khanty-Mansi Autonomous Okrug - Yugra
- Editor-in-chief: Valentina Vasilyevna Uzel
- Staff writers: 8 (2025)
- Founded: February 11, 1989; 36 years ago
- Language: Northern Mansi
- Headquarters: Ulitsa Komsomol'skaya, 31, Khanty-Mansiysk, Khanty-Mansi Autonomous Okrug, Russia
- Country: Russia
- Circulation: 1750 (as of 2014)
- Sister newspapers: Hănty jasăꞑ (1957–present)
- Website: khanty-yasang.ru/luima-seripos

Lūimā sēripos (cyrl. Лӯима̄ сэ̄рипос, en. Northern dawn) is a Northern Mansi language newspaper, published in Khanty-Mansi Autonomous Okrug - Yugra.

The newspaper has been published since February 11, 1989. Prior to that, materials in the Northern Mansi language were published in the predominantly Khanty-language newspaper "Ленин пант хуват" ("On the Lenin Way"). It is the world's only newspaper in the Northern Mansi language.

The newspaper publishes materials about the most important events of the Khanty-Mansi Autonomous Okrug - Yugra, the material and spiritual development of Mansi people, as well as about other Uralic peoples.
