= Yona, Russia =

Yona Ёна
- Selo
- Interactive map of Yona
- Location of Yona Yona (Murmansk Oblast)
- Coordinates: 67°36′26″N 31°09′18″E
- Country: Russia
- Federal subject: Murmansk Oblast
- Administrative district: Kovdorsky District
- Territorial okrugSelsoviet: Yonsky Territorial Okrug
- Founded: 1574 or 1840 (see text)
- Elevation: 156 m (512 ft)

Population (2010 Census)
  - Total: 314
  - Estimate (2021): 139 (−55.7%)

Municipal status
  - Urban okrug: Kovdorsky Urban Okrug
- Time zone: UTC+3 (MSK)
- Postal code: 184131
- Dialing code: +7 81535
- OKTMO ID: 47703000126

Yona (Russian: Ёна) is a rural locality (a selo) in Kovdorsky District of Murmansk Oblast, Russia, located beyond the Arctic Circle at a height of 156 meters (512 ft) above sea level. Population: 314 (2010 Census). The village is home to the remaining ethnic Akkala Sámi, represented by a cultural office.

== History ==
It was first mentioned as the pogost of Yono-Babinsky (Ёно-Бабинский) in 1574. According to other sources, it was established by Finns and Sami in 1840.
