= Yery with macron =

Cyrillic letter

- Ы̄ ы̄

Usage
- Writing system: Cyrillic
- Type: Alphabetic

Yery with macron (Ы̄ ы̄; italics: Ы̄ ы̄) is a letter of the Cyrillic script.

Yery with macron is used in the Aleut (Bering dialect), Evenki, Mansi, Nanai, Negidal, Ulch and Selkup languages.

== See also ==
- Cyrillic characters in Unicode
- Ȳ ȳ : Latin letter Y with macron
