= E with diaeresis and macron (Cyrillic) =

Cyrillic letter

- Ӭ̄ ӭ̄

Usage
- Writing system: Cyrillic
- Type: Alphabetic

E with diaeresis and macron (Ӭ̄ ӭ̄; italics: Ӭ̄ ӭ̄) is a letter of the Cyrillic script.

E with diaeresis and macron is only used in the Kildin Sami language.

== See also ==
- Cyrillic characters in Unicode
