= O with macron (Latin) =

Additional letter in Latin script

- Ō ō

Usage
- Writing system: Latin script
- Type: Alphabetic
- Language of origin: Latin language
- In Unicode: U+014C, U+014D

Other
- Writing direction: Left-to-right

O with macron (majuscule: Ō, minuscule: ō) is an additional letter of the Latin script, formed from the base letter O with the addition of the macron diacritic mark.

It is used in various Polynesian languages, such as Cook Islands Māori, Dorig, Hawaiian, Hiw, Māori, Marshallese, Marquesan, Mwotlap, Samoan, Tahitian, Tongan, and Vurës, as well as Latgalian, Livonian, Samogitian, and Silesian in Central Europe, Nahuatl in Mexico, Ewondo in Cameroon, and Ogba in Nigeria. The letter is also used in the Hepburn romanization of Japanese, the pinyin romanization system of Standard Chinese, and the ISO 9 standard for romanization of Cyrillic characters.

== Usage ==
=== Oceanic languages ===
The letter Ō is present in many Polynesian languages, where it usually represents the long version of the sound represented by the letter O. Most commonly, it represents the long close-mid back rounded vowel sound ([o:]). It is the case for, among others, Cook Islands Māori, Hawaiian, Marquesan, Tahitian, and Tongan.

In Māori it can be pronounced either as a long close-mid back rounded vowel sound ([o:]), or a long open-mid back rounded vowel sound ([ɔː]).

In Vurës and Hiw, it is pronounced as a close-mid back rounded vowel sound ([o]), in Samoan, as open-mid back rounded vowel sound ([ɔː]), in Dorig, and Mwotlap, as a near-close near-back rounded vowel sound ([ʊ]), and in Marshallese, as a close-mid back unrounded vowel sound ([ɤ]).

=== European languages ===
The letter Ō is used in the Silesian primer alphabet, one of two popular writing systems of Silesian language. Depending on a dialect, it represents the sounds in the range between a close-mid back rounded vowel ([o]) and a close back rounded vowel ([u]). In the Steuer's Silesian alphabet, and the Silesian Phonetic Alphabet, two other writing systems, this function is represented by the letter Ů.

In Latvia, the letter is present in Latgalian and Livonian, where it represents, respectively, a long open-mid back rounded vowel ([ɔ:]), and a long close-mid back rounded vowel sound ([o:]). It is also used in Samogitian, spoken in Lithuania, for both of those sounds.

=== African languages ===
In the Ewondo language, Ō is used to represent the mid tone of a close-mid back rounded vowel sound ([o]). The letter is also present in Ogba language, where a macron diacritic mark is used to indicate a tonal downstep.

=== Indigenous languages of the Americas ===
In Michel Launey's normalized orthography of Nahuatl, Ō is used to represent a long close-mid back rounded vowel sound ([o:]). In traditional orthography, such function is done by either U or V.

=== Romanizations ===
In the Hepburn romanization of Japanese, the letter Ō is used to represent a long close-mid back rounded vowel sound ([o:]).

In the pinyin romanization system of Standard Chinese, Ō is used to represent a first tone (flat or high-level tone) of an open-mid back rounded vowel sound ([ɔ˥]).

In the ISO 9 standard for transliteration into Latin characters of Cyrillic characters, Ō is used to represent the letter O with macron (majuscule: О̄, minuscule: о̄).

== Computing codes ==
Character information
Preview	Ō		ō	
Unicode name	LATIN CAPITAL LETTER O WITH MACRON		LATIN SMALL LETTER O WITH MACRON	
Encodings	decimal	hex	dec	hex
Unicode	332	U+014C	333	U+014D
UTF-8	197 140	C5 8C	197 141	C5 8D
Numeric character reference	&#332;	&#x14C;	&#333;	&#x14D;
Named character reference	&Omacr;		&omacr;	
