= Akkala Sámi =

Extinct Uralic language from Russia

- Babin Sami
- Native to: Russia
- Region: Southwest Kola Peninsula
- Ethnicity: 80 Akkala Sámi (2011)
- Extinct: 29 December 2003, with the death of Mariya Sergina; 4 passive speakers (2018)
- Language family: Uralic: Sámi; Eastern; Mainland; Akkala Sámi

Language codes
- ISO 639-3: sia
- Glottolog: akka1237
- ELP: Akkala Saami
- Akkala Sami language area (red) within Sápmi (grey)

- Akkala Sámi is classified as Extinct by the UNESCO Atlas of the World's Languages in Danger (2010)

Akkala Sámi, also referred to, particularly in Russia, as Babin Sámi (Russian: Бабинский саа́мский), was a Sámi language spoken in the Sámi villages of Aʼkkel (Russian: Бабинский; Finnish: Akkala), Čuʼkksuâl (Russian: Экостровский) and Sââʼrvesjäuʼrr (Russian: Гирвасозеро; Finnish: Hirvasjärvi), in the inland parts of the Kola Peninsula in Russia. Formerly erroneously regarded as a dialect of Kildin Sámi, it has recently become recognized as an independent Sámi language that is most closely related to its western neighbor Skolt Sámi, although the two are somewhat mutually intelligible.

Akkala Sámi was noted as extinct in the 2010 UNESCO Atlas of the World's Languages in Danger. Previously, it had been considered the most endangered Eastern Sámi language. On 29 December 2003 Maria Sergina – the last fluent native speaker of Akkala Sámi – died. However, as of 2011 there were at least two people, both aged 70, with some knowledge of Akkala Sámi. Remaining ethnic Akkala Sámi live in the village Yona, where there is a cultural office.

Although there exists a description of Akkala Sámi phonology and morphology, a few published texts, and archived audio recordings, as well as a grammar of the language, the Akkala Sámi language remains among the most poorly documented Sámi languages. One of the few items in the language are chapters 23–28 of the Gospel of Matthew published in 1897. It was translated by Arvid Genetz and published by the Finnish Literature Society, with costs paid by the British and Foreign Bible Society.

In the Russian 2020 census, 1 person still claimed knowledge of Akkala.

Sámi dialects and settlements in Russia: Akkala (Russian Babinsky) A-1 Aʼkkel (Russian Babinsky, Finnish Akkala) A-2 Čuʼkksuâl (Russian Ekostrovsky) A-3 Yona A-4 Sââʼrvesjäuʼrr (Russian Girvasozero, Finnish Hirvasjärvi)

== Morphology ==
The following overview is based on Pekka (Pyotr) M. Zaykov's volume. Zaykov's Uralic phonetic transcription is retained here. The middle dot ˑ denotes palatalization of the preceding consonant, analyzed by Zaykov as semisoft pronunciation.

=== Noun ===
Akkala Sámi has eight cases, singular and plural: nominative, genitive-accusative, partitive, dative-illative, locative, essive, comitative and abessive. Case and number are expressed by a combination of endings and consonant gradation:

- Nominative: no marker in the singular, weak grade in the plural.
- Genitive-accusative: weak grade in the singular, weak grade + -i in the plural.
- Partitive: this case exists only in the singular, and has the ending -tti͔.
- Dative-illative: strong grade + -a, -a͕ or -ɛ in the singular, weak grade + -i in the plural.
- Locative: weak grade + -st, -śtˑ in the singular, weak grade + -nˑ in the plural.
- Essive: this case exists only in the singular: strong grade + -nˑ.
- Comitative: weak grade + -nˑ in the singular, strong grade + -guim, -vuim or -vi̮i̭m in the plural.
- Abessive: weak grade + -ta in the singular.

=== Pronoun ===
The table below gives the declension of the personal pronouns monn ‘I’ and mij ‘we’. The pronouns tonn ‘you (sg.)’ and sonn ‘(s)he’ are declined like monn, the pronouns tij ‘you (pl.)’ and sij ‘they’ are declined like mij.

	Singular	Plural
Nominative	monn	mij
Genitive-Accusative	mū	mii̭ji
Essive	munˑ	—N/a
Dative-illative	munˑnˑa͔	mii̭ji
Locative	muśtˑ	miśtˑ
Comitative	muinˑ	mii̭jivuim
Abessive	muta	mii̭ta

The interrogative pronouns mī ‘what?’ and tˑī, kī ‘who?’ are declined as follows:

	mī ‘what?’	tˑī, kī ‘who?’
Nominative	mī	tˑī, kī
Genitive-Accusative	mi̮n	t́an, ḱan
Dative-illative	mi̮z	koz
Locative	mi̮st	kośtˑ
Comitative	mi̮i̭nˑ	ḱainˑ
Abessive	mi̮nta	ḱanta

The demonstratives are declined as follows:

	proximal tˑa͕t ‘this’		medial ti̮t ‘that’	
	Singular	Plural	Singular	Plural
Nominative	tˑa͕t	tˑa͕k	ti̮t	ti̮k
Genitive-Accusative	tˑa͕nˑ	tˑa͕i	ti̮n	ti̮i̭
Essive	tˑa͕inˑ	—N/a	ti̮i̭nˑ	—N/a
Dative-illative	tˑa͕z	tˑai(t)	ti̮k, ti̮z	ti̮i̭(t)
Locative	tˑa͕śtˑ	tˑa͕in	ti̮śtˑ	ti̮i̼(n)
Comitative	tˑa͕inˑ	tˑa͕ivuim	ti̮i̭nˑ	ti̮i̭vuim
Abessive	tˑa͕ta	tˑa͕ita	ti̮ta	ti̮i̭ta

=== Verb ===
Akkala Sámi verbs have three persons and two numbers, singular and plural. There are three moods: indicative, imperative and conditional; the potential mood has disappeared.

verb va͕n̄ˑće ‘to walk’
	Present	Imperfect
1SG	vā͕nʒam	va͕n̄ˑcim
2SG	va͕nʒak	vā͕nˑcik
3SG	va͕n̄ˑc	vānˑʒi
1PL	va͕n̄ˑćepˑ	vānˑʒim
2PL	va͕nˑćepˑpˑe	vānˑʒitˑ
3PL	vā͕nˑʒatˑ	van̄ˑciš

verb korrɛ ‘to knit’
	Present	Imperfect
1SG	kōram	korri͔m
2SG	kōrak	korri͔k
3SG	korr	kōri͔
1PL	korrɛpˑ	kōri͔m
2PL	korrɛpˑpˑe	kōri͔tˑ
3PL	kōratˑ	korri͔š

verb ĺiije ‘to be’
	Present	Imperfect
1SG	ĺam	ĺii̭jim
2SG	ĺak	ĺiijik
3SG	ĺie	ĺai
1PL	ĺepˑ	ĺījim
2PL	ĺepˑpˑe	ĺījitˑ
3PL	ĺetˑ	ĺii̭jiš

Compound tenses such as perfect and pluperfect are formed with the verb ĺii̭je in the present or imperfect as auxiliary, and the participle of the main verb. Examples are ĺam tĭĕhtmi̮nč ‘I have known’ from tĭĕhttɛ ‘to know’, and ĺai tui̭jāma ‘(s)he had made’ from tui̭je ‘to make’.

The conditional mood has the marker -č, which is added to the weak grade of the stem: kuarčim ‘I would sew’, vizzčik ‘you (sg.) would become tired’.

As in other Sámi languages, Akkala Sámi makes use of a negative verb that conjugates according to person and number, while the main verb remains unchanged. The conjugation of the negative verb is shown here together with the verb aĺ̄ḱe ‘to begin’:

verb aĺ̄ḱe ‘to begin’
1SG	jim aĺg
2SG	jik aĺg
3SG	ij aĺg
1PL	jepˑ aĺg
2PL	jepˑpˑe aĺg
3PL	jetˑ aĺg

The third person singular and plural of the verb ĺii̭je ‘to be’ have special contracted forms ɛĺĺa and jāĺa.
