= E with macron (Cyrillic) =

Cyrillic letter

- Э̄ э̄

Usage
- Writing system: Cyrillic
- Type: Alphabetic

E with macron (Э̄ э̄; italics: Э̄ э̄) is a letter of the Cyrillic script.

E with macron is used in the Aleut (Bering dialect), Evenki, Mansi, Nanai, Negidal, Orok, Ulch, Kildin Sami, Selkup and Chechen languages.

== See also ==
- Е̄ е̄ : Cyrillic letter Ye with macron
- Ē ē : Latin letter Ē
- Cyrillic characters in Unicode
