= Yo with macron =

Cyrillic letter used in various languages

- Ё̄ ё̄

Usage
- Writing system: Cyrillic
- Type: Alphabetic
- Language of origin: Even, Evenki, Northern Mansi, Nanai, Negidal, Kildin Sami, Selkup, Ulch
- Sound values: [joː]

History
Development
A28
      - 𐤄
        - Ε ε
          - Е е
            - Ё ё
              - Ё̄ ё̄

Yo with macron (Ё̄ ё̄; italics: Ё̄ ё̄) is a letter of the Cyrillic script. Its form is derived from the Cyrillic letter Yo with the addition of a macron.

Yo with macron is used in the Even, Evenki, Northern Mansi, Nanai, Negidal, Kildin Sami, Selkup and Ulch languages, where it usually represents [joː] or a similar sound.

== See also ==
- Cyrillic characters in Unicode
