= Ulch language =

Tungusic language of far eastern Russia

Ulch
- Нāнʼи хэсэни
- Native to: Russia
- Region: Khabarovskiy Kray
- Ethnicity: 2,800 Ulch (2010 census)
- Native speakers: 150 (2010 census)
- Language family: Tungusic: Southern; Nanaic; Ulch
- Writing system: Cyrillic

Language codes
- ISO 639-3: ulc
- Glottolog: ulch1241
- ELP: Ulch
- Linguasphere: 44-CAA-eea
- Ulch is classified as Critically Endangered by the UNESCO Atlas of the World's Languages in Danger.

The Ulch language, or Olcha, is a Tungusic language spoken by the Ulch people in the Russian Far East. The language is moribund, with only 150 speakers (2010 census).

== Phonology ==
=== Vowels ===
	Front	Central	Back
Close	i		u
Mid	ɪ ~ e	ə	ʊ ~ o
Open		a	

- Vowel length is also distributed.

=== Consonants ===
		Labial	Alveolar	Alveolo- palatal	Velar	Uvular
Nasal		m	n	ɲ	ŋ	
Plosive/ Affricate	voiceless	p	t	t͡ɕ	k	(q)
Plosive/ Affricate	voiced	b	d	d͡ʑ	ɡ	
Fricative	voiceless	(f)	s		x	(χ)
Fricative	voiced	β			(ɣ)	
Lateral			l			
Rhotic			r			
Approximant		(w)		j		

- [f] is a rare sound in native words.
- /β ɡ/ have allophones of [w ɣ].
- /k x/ can become uvularized as [q χ] before vowels /a o/.

== Alphabet ==
А а	(а̄)	Б б	В в	Г г	Д д	Дʼ дʼ	Е е
(е̄)	Ё ё	(ё̄)	Ж ж	З з	И и	(ӣ)	Й й
К к	Л л	М м	Н н	Нʼ нʼ	Ӈ ӈ	О о	(о̄)
П п	Р р	С с	Т т	У у	(ӯ)	Ф ф	Х х
Ц ц	Ч ч	Ш ш	Щ щ	ъ	Ы ы	ь	Э э
(э̄)	Ю ю	(ю̄)	Я я	(я̄)

In brackets are letters that are used in writing, though not officially included in the alphabet.

== Bibliography ==
- Bitkeeva, A.N.; V.Y. Gusev; O.A. Povoroznyuk; D.A. Funk; N.V. Khokhlov; K.G. Shakhovtsov (2005). "Endangered Languages of Indigenous Peoples of Siberia". UNESCO Moscow Office. Archived from the original on 28 July 2009.
- Sunik, O. P. (1985). Ul'chskij jazyk: issledovanija i materially. Leningrad: Nauka, Leningradskoe Otdelenie. 262pp.
