= Yu with macron =

Cyrillic letter

- Ю̄ ю̄

Usage
- Writing system: Cyrillic
- Type: Alphabetic

Yu with macron (Ю̄ ю̄; italics: Ю̄ ю̄) is a letter of the Cyrillic script. Its ligature is derived from the Cyrillic letter Yu (Юю) by adding a macron on top.

Yu with macron is used in the Aleut (Bering dialect), Evenki, Mansi, Nanai, Negidal, Orok, Ulch, Kildin Sami, and Selkup languages.

== See also ==
- Cyrillic characters in Unicode
