= A with diaeresis and macron (Cyrillic) =

Cyrillic letter used for /ʲaː/ in Kildin Sami

- Ӓ̄ ӓ̄

Usage
- Writing system: Cyrillic
- Type: Alphabetic
- Sound values: [ʲaː]

History
- Development: Α α: А а; Ӓ ӓ; Ӓ̄ ӓ̄

A with diaeresis and macron (Ӓ̄ ӓ̄; italics: Ӓ̄ ӓ̄) is a letter of the Cyrillic script. In all its forms it looks exactly like the Latin letter A with diaeresis and macron (Ǟ ǟ Ǟ ǟ).

A with diaeresis and macron is used only in the alphabet of the Kildin Sami language where it represents a lengthened palatalized open front unrounded vowel /ʲaː/.

== See also ==
- Ǟ ǟ : Latin letter Ǟ
- Cyrillic characters in Unicode
