= O with macron (Cyrillic) =

Cyrillic letter

- О̄ о̄

Usage
- Writing system: Cyrillic
- Type: Alphabetic

O with macron (О̄ о̄; italics: О̄ о̄) is a letter of the Cyrillic script. In all its forms it is homoglyphic with the Latin letter O with macron (Ō ō Ō ō).

O with macron are used in the Evenki, Mansi, Nanai, Negidal, Orok, Ulch, Kildin Sami, Selkup, and Chechen languages.

O with macron also appears in the Rusyn language in Ukraine, representing a close allophone of /o/. However, this letter primarily features in materials for beginning readers; the same sound is otherwise represented with the Cyrillic letter О.

== Computing codes ==
Character information
Preview	О		о		̄	
Unicode name	CYRILLIC CAPITAL LETTER O		CYRILLIC SMALL LETTER O		COMBINING MACRON	
Encodings	decimal	hex	dec	hex	dec	hex
Unicode	1054	U+041E	1086	U+043E	772	U+0304
UTF-8	208 158	D0 9E	208 190	D0 BE	204 132	CC 84
Numeric character reference	&#1054;	&#x41E;	&#1086;	&#x43E;	&#772;	&#x304;
Named character reference	&Ocy;		&ocy;			

== See also ==
- O o : Latin letter O
- Ō ō : Latin letter Ō - an archaic letter in Latvian, and a letter in Latgalian, Livonian, Samogitian and Silesian.
- О о : Cyrillic letter О
- Cyrillic characters in Unicode
