= A with macron (Cyrillic) =

Letter of the Cyrillic script

Usage
- Writing system: Cyrillic
- Type: Alphabetic
- Sound values: [ɑː]

A with macron (А̄ а̄; italics: А̄ а̄) is a letter of the Cyrillic script. In all its forms it looks exactly like the Latin letter A with macron (Ā ā Ā ā).

A with macron is used in the Aleut (Bering dialect), Evenki, Ingush, Mansi, Nanai, Orok, Ulch, Kildin Sami, Selkup, and Chechen languages.

A with macron also appears in the Bulgarian and Serbian languages in some dialects.

== Usage ==
=== South Slavic languages ===
A with macron is used in the South Slavic languages mostly in Bulgarian usually used before or after another stressed vowel: глāвà, крāкà, овчāрè, ковāчè, юнāцѝ, and граждāнè.

== Computing codes ==
Being a relatively recent letter, not present in any legacy 8-bit Cyrillic encoding, the letter А̄ is not represented directly by a precomposed character in Unicode either; it has to be composed as А+◌̄ (U+0304).

Character information
Preview	А		а		̄	
Unicode name	CYRILLIC CAPITAL LETTER A		CYRILLIC SMALL LETTER A		COMBINING MACRON	
Encodings	decimal	hex	dec	hex	dec	hex
Unicode	1040	U+0410	1072	U+0430	772	U+0304
UTF-8	208 144	D0 90	208 176	D0 B0	204 132	CC 84
Numeric character reference	&#1040;	&#x410;	&#1072;	&#x430;	&#772;	&#x304;
Named character reference	&Acy;		&acy;			

== See also ==
- A a : Latin letter A
- Ā ā : Latin letter A with macron - a Latvian, Latgalian, Livonian, and Samogitian letter
- А а : Cyrillic letter А
- Cyrillic characters in Unicode
