= Ye with macron =

Cyrillic letter

Usage
- Writing system: Cyrillic
- Type: Alphabetic
- Sound values: ʢ

Ye with macron (Е̄ е̄; italics: Е̄ е̄) is a letter of the Cyrillic script. In all its forms it looks exactly like the Latin letter E with macron (Ē ē Ē ē).

Ye with macron was used in the Aleut (Bering dialect), but is still used in Evenki, Mansi, Nanai, Negidal, Orok, Kildin Sami, Selkup and Chechen languages.

Ye with macron also appears in some dialects of several South Slavic languages.

== Usage ==
=== South Slavic languages ===
Ye with macron is used some South Slavic languages, mainly in the Bulgarian language usually before or after another accented vowel so that the long syllables were skipped and the accent fell on the short vowel: дѐве̄р, грѐбе̄н, рѐпе̄й, and пѐпе̄л. It is also used in some Serbian texts in some words: дêве̄р.

== Computing codes ==
Being a relatively recent letter, not present in any legacy 8-bit Cyrillic encoding, the letter Е̄ is not represented directly by a precomposed character in Unicode either; it has to be composed as Е+◌̄ (U+0304).

Character information
Preview	Е		е		̄	
Unicode name	CYRILLIC CAPITAL LETTER IE		CYRILLIC SMALL LETTER IE		COMBINING MACRON	
Encodings	decimal	hex	dec	hex	dec	hex
Unicode	1045	U+0415	1077	U+0435	772	U+0304
UTF-8	208 149	D0 95	208 181	D0 B5	204 132	CC 84
Numeric character reference	&#1045;	&#x415;	&#1077;	&#x435;	&#772;	&#x304;
Named character reference	&IEcy;		&iecy;			

== See also ==
- Ē ē : Latin letter Ē - a Latvian, Latgalian, Livonian, and Samogitian letter
- Cyrillic characters in Unicode
