= Udege language =

Tungusic language

Udege
- Udihe
- Удиэ кэйэни Удиэ кэйэвэни
- Native to: Russia
- Region: Russian Far East
- Ethnicity: 1,325 Udeges (2020 census)
- Native speakers: 674 (2020 census)
- Language family: Tungusic: Northern; Udegheic; Udege
- Dialects: Kur-Urmi; Northern; Southern/Kyakala
- Writing system: Cyrillic

Language codes
- ISO 639-3: ude
- Glottolog: udih1248
- ELP: Udege
- Linguasphere: 44-CAA-da
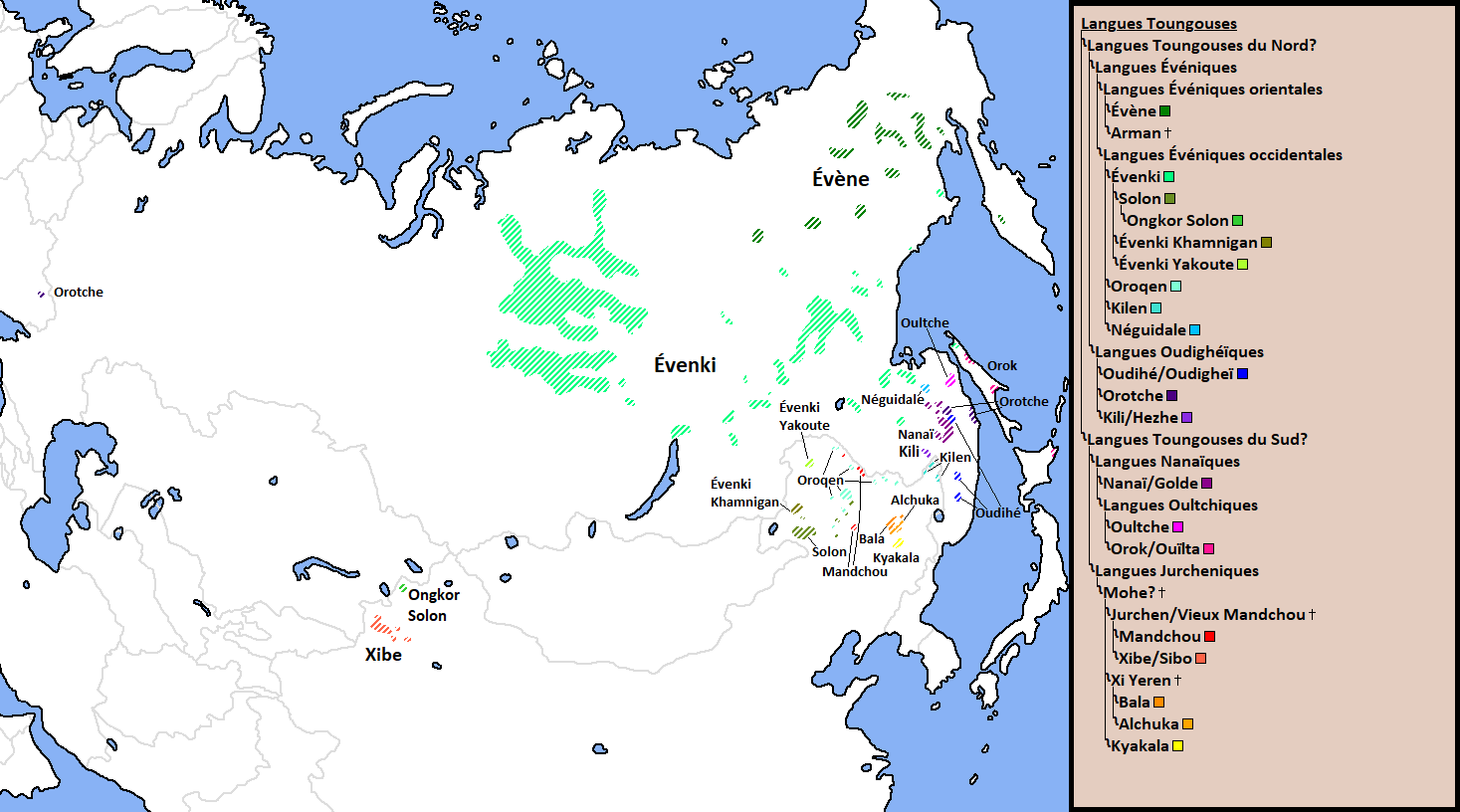
- Map of the Tungusic languages. Udege

- Udege is classified as Critically Endangered by the UNESCO Atlas of the World's Languages in Danger.

Udege (also known as Udihe, Udekhe and Udeghe) is the language of the Udege people. It is a member of the Tungusic family. It is a moribund language, and classified as critically endangered by the UNESCO Atlas of the World's Languages in Danger.

== Ethnonyms ==
Until the beginning of the 20th century, neither the Orochs, nor the Udeges, nor the Tazes, who were considered one ethnic group, had a common self-name, each group had its own territorial name. Ethnic identity was present rather "implicitly", i.e. when local autochthonous inhabitants were opposed to alien peoples (Chinese, Manchus, Koreans, etc.).

For the first time, a common ethnonym for the Udeges, Orochs and Taz was given by Jean-François de Laperouse by the common ethnonym Orochons (French: les orotchys) for the indigenous population living along the coast of the Tatar Strait and the Sea of Japan, namely in the Gulf of De-Kastri in 1787 in time of his round-the-world trip. This name was in use in literature until the beginning of the 20th century, when the Udege language received its modern name.

For the first time, the term удиhе (udihe) as a designation for the people was introduced by the Russian author S. N. Brailovsky (Russian: Сергей Николаевич Браиловский) in his 1901 ethnographic report. This self-designation was worn by one of the groups of northern Udege. At the same time, he did not separate the Udege and Orochs. Brailovsky also began to use the term taz as a synonym for the term udihe. In the late 1920s, a campaign was launched in the country to change ethnonyms. The Orochons were divided into three groups and became Orochs, Udeges or Tazes. For the first time, such a division can be found in the works of Arseniev V. K.

== Geographic distribution ==
Udege is a highly endangered Manchu-Tungusic language spoken in the southern part of Russian Far East. The Udege live in Khabarovsk Krai (districts: Imeni Lazo, Nanaisky) and Primorsky krai (districts: Terneyskiy, Pozharsky, Krasnoarmeysky), and also in the Jewish Autonomous Oblast (JAO). It is spoken on the Khor and Bikin rivers.

According to the latest censuses (1989, 2002 and 2010), the number of Udege is constantly decreasing from 1,902 in 1989 to 1,496 in 2010. In 2010, 620 people were registered in the Khabarosky krai; 793 people lived in Primorsky krai. An additional 83 Udege were registered outside of these territories, including 42 people in the JAO. The census data also reflect the steady decline of the language: according to the 1989 census, Udege was spoken by 462 people, in 2002 it was 227 people, and in 2010 it was only 103 people. The 2010 census shows a sharp drop in the Udihe competence in the Khabarovsky Krai (from 96 to 16 people!).

In the 1930s, the Udege were forcibly made sedentary: each areal group was settled in a specially built permanent settlement: Kukan (Kur-Urmi Udihe), Bira (Anyuy), Kun (Hungari), Agzu (Samarga), Gvasyugi (Khor), Syain, Mitahheza and Olon (Bikin), Sanchikheza (Iman). The less numerous sea-shore Udihe were dispersed. In the 1950s, a system of boarding schools for Udege children took shape, which finally broke the continuity of generations and oriented young people on speedy Russification. In the 1960s and 70s in the course of the “consolidation of villages” campaign, smaller Udihe villages were liquidated: Bira (Anyuy), Sanchiheza (Iman), Syain and Mitakheza (Bikin). The Bikin Udihe resettled in the new Udihe village of Krasny Yar (Pozharsky rayon); and Anyuy and Iman Udihe were resettled into neighboring Russian villages. As a result of this policy, there are no monoethnic Udege settlements.

== Dialects ==
Traditionally, the Udihe were semi-nomads, moving within a limited territory, each along a particular river and its tributaries, thereby forming territorial groups which usually consisted of several families. The territorial groups are mostly named after the corresponding rivers: (1) Kur-Urmi, (2) Samarga, (3) Anyuy, (4) Khungari, (5) Khor, (6) Bikin, (7) Iman, and (8) Sea shore (Namunka). From a linguistic point of view, the dialects of the Udege language, as well as the Oroch language, form a common continuum. Actually, the Udege continuum is divided along the “north-south” line, relating to all levels: phonetics and phonology, morphology and vocabulary, syntax. There are no sufficient materials on the Kur-Urmi dialect.

The Udihe dialects can be classified as follows:

- Kur-Urmi

Northern group:

- **Khor** (udg. хуӈка)
- Anyuy (udg. униӈка)
- Samarga (udg. самаргиӈка)
- Khungari (udg. хуӈгаке) †

Southern group:

- **Bikin** (udg. бикиӈка)
- Iman (udg. имаӈка)
- Primorskiy (sea shore) (udg. намуӈка) †

The dialects in bold are literary.

The southern dialects are also known as Kekar or Kyakala. The "Kyakala" of Russia is not to be confused with the Jurchenic "Kyakala" spoken in China, also called Chinese Kyakala in order to distinguish it from "Russian Kyakala" (i.e., Kekar, or southern Udegheic). Kyakala went extinct in the early 20th century.

In the 1930s, the Khor dialect on a Latin basis, created by Yevgeny Robertovich Schneider, was taken as the basis for the literary Udege language, which existed until 1937, when it was repressed, and all literature created in Latin was banned. Instead, the Cyrillic alphabet was formally introduced as part of a general campaign, but de facto the Udege language became unwritten until the 1980s.

In the late 1980s, two literary languages began to form in the Udege language:

- one for the northern group based on the Khor dialect (Simonov-Kulyandziga alphabet; "Khabarovsk");

- the second for the southern group based on the Bikin dialect (the alphabet of Perekhvalskaya; "Leningrad" / "Petersburg").

== Phonology ==
The dialects of the Udege language differ in their sound composition, primarily in the system of vocalism. Northern dialects are characterized by the presence of five categories of vowel phonemes: short, long, diphthongs (which are similar in nature to long ones), glottalized and aspirated. In the southern dialects, aspirated vowels are absent, diphthongs tend to monophthongization. Vowel harmony is characteristic of all dialects. As for consonantism, there are 20 consonant phonemes in the northern dialects of the Udege language, and 19 in the southern dialects (there is no velar fricative /ɣ/).

General composition of vowels
	Front		Central	Back
Close	i iː	y yː		u uː
Mid	e eː	ø øː	ə əː	o oː
Open	æ æː		a aː	

Vowels of northern group
Long	/aː/, /oː/, /uː/, /əː/, /iː/, /iə/, /eæ/, /yø/, /yi/
Long laryngealized (glottalized)	/aˀa/, /oˀo/, (əˀə)
Long pharyngealized (aspirated)	/aʰa/, /oʰo/, /uʰu/, /əʰə/, /iʰi/, (iʰe), /eʰæ/, /yʰø/, /yʰi/

Vowels of southern group
Long	/aː/, /oː/, /uː/, /əː/, /iː/, /eː/, /æː/, /øː/
Long laryngealized (glottalized)	/aˀa/, /oˀo/, (əˀə)

The nature of glottalized and aspirated vowels in Udege can be explained by the loss of some consonants in the position between two vowels. Experimental studies have shown that in the northern dialects glottalized vowels are interrupted by a bow, therefore they are called "discontinuous". With a more fluent pronunciation, the bow is replaced by a "creaky" phonation.

In the related Udege language, aspirated and discontinuous vowels correspond to three-phonemic combinations of vowels with consonants. In general, aspirated long vowels are formed from the combination V-s-V, and glottalized long vowels from the combination V-q-V.

Consonants
	Labial		Alveolar		Palatal		Velar		Glottal
Plosive	p	b	t	d			k	ɡ	ʔ
Fricative			s				x	ɣ (Note: as a separate phoneme exists in the Khor dialect.)	h
Affricate			(t͡s)	(d͡z)	t͡ʃ	d͡ʒ (Note: in the southern group it is realized as /ts/ and /dz/ respectively.)			
Nasal	m		n		ɲ		ŋ		
Approximant	w				j				
Lateral			l						

- /d͡z/ in the Southern dialect can have an allophone of [z].
- /p/ in medial positions can be heard as [f].

== Orthography ==
Previously an oral language, in 1931 an alphabet was created for writing Udege as a part of latinisation in the Soviet Union. In 1938 the policy of latinisation was reversed and the written Udige language was banned by Soviet authorities. Books in Udihe were collected and burned. Evgeny Schneider, an Udige language author and translator, was declared an enemy of the people and executed.

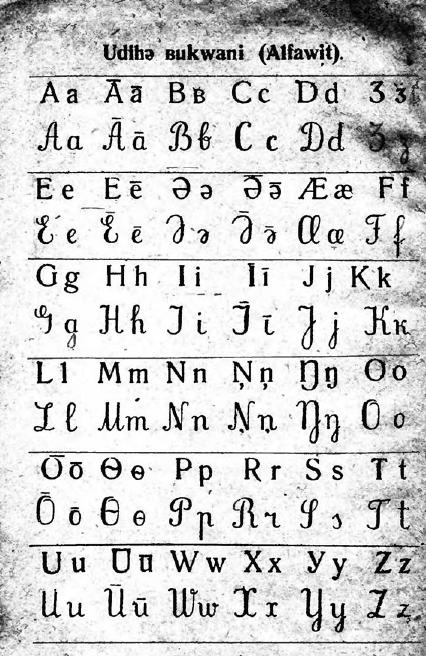
1932 Udege latin alphabet primer giving each letter. Each letter is shown in print and handwritten styles. ⟨’⟩ is not included.

1931-1937 Alphabet
A a	Ā ā	B в	C c	D d	Ӡ ӡ	E e	Ē ē
Æ æ	F f	G g	H h	I i	Ī ī	J j	K k
L l	M m	N n	Ņ ņ	Ŋ ŋ	O o	Ō ō	Ө ө
P p	R r	S s	T t	U u	Ū ū	W w	X x
Y y	Z z	’

Udege is currently written in two versions of the Cyrillic alphabet, known as the "Petersburg" and the "Khabarovsk" versions, which represent different dialects of Udege. The Khabarovsk version, for the Khor dialect, is used more often.

Cyrillic alphabet (Khabarovsk version)
А а	ʻА ʻа	А̄ а̄	А̂ а̂	Б б	В в	Г г	Ғ ғ
Д д	Ӡ ӡ	И и	Ӣ ӣ	И̂ и̂	Й й	К к	Л л
М м	Н н	Њ њ	Ӈ ӈ	О о	ʻО ʻо	О̄ о̄	О̂ о̂
П п	Р р	С с	Т т	У у	Ӯ ӯ	У̂ ŷ	Ф ф
Х х	Ч ч	ь	Э э	ʻЭ ʻэ	Э̄ э̄	Э̂ э̂

A few older letters that were used in this language: Ж ж, З з, Љ љ, Ц ц, Ш ш, Щ щ, Ъ ъ, Ы ы, ‘Ы ‘ы, Ы̄ ы̄, Ы̂ ы̂, Ю ю, ‘Ю ‘ю, Ю̄ ю̄, Ю̂ ю̂, Я я, ‘Я ‘я, Я̄ я̄, Я̂ я̂

Cyrillic alphabet (Petersburg version)
А а	Б б	В в	(Ԝ ԝ)	Г г	Д д	Ә ә	Е е
Ё ё	Ж ж	З з	Ӡ ӡ	И и	Й й	К к	Л л
М м	Н н	Ӈ ӈ	Њ њ	О о	П п	Р р	С с
Т т	У у	Ф ф	Х х	Ц ц	Ч ч	Ш ш	Щ щ
Ъ ъ	Ч ч	Ы ы	Ь ь	Э э	Ю ю	Я я

== Vocabulary ==
Udege contains a variety of loanwords from the closely related Nanai language, which have supplanted some older Udege vocabulary, such as:

- [banixe] (thank you), from Nanai [banixa], instead of Udege [usasa]
- [dœlbo] (work), from Nanai [dœbo], instead of Udege [etete]
- [daŋsa] (book) from Nanai [daŋsa], itself a loanword from Chinese: 檔子 (Pinyin: dāngzi), which actually means "file, records, archives"

In general, a large degree of mutual assimilation of the two languages has been observed in the Bikin region. Udege has also exerted phonological influence on the Bikin dialect of Nanai, including monophthongisation of diphthongs, denasalisation of nasal vowels, deletion of reduced final vowels, epenthetic vowels preventing consonant final words, and the deletion of intervocalic [w].

== Sample text ==
The beginning of the fairy tale "Selemege":

E. R. Snejder's (Schneider) alphabet	Omo jəgdig’ə bagdehæni, mam’asaxi-da. Mam’asani gə̄nʒi bisini. Tu bisiti. Bimi-də mam’asatigī digaŋkini: — Bi Sələməgə guniəiwəti isənəʒəmi, — guŋkini.
"Khabarovsk" Cyrillic alphabet (alphabet by M. D. Simonov and V. T. Kyalundzyuga)	Омо йэгдэғ’э багдиэ̂ни, мам’асахи-да. Мам’асани гэ̅нʒи бисини. Ту бисити. Бими-дэ мамас’атиғи̅ диғаңкини: — Би Сэлэмэгэ гунэивэти исэнэʒэми, — гуңкини.
"Leningrad" Cyrillic (alphabet by E. V. Perekhvalskaya)	Омо йəгдəг’ə багдиəни, мам’асахи-да. Мам’асани гə́нʒи бисини. Ту бисити. Бими-дə мамас’атигий диаңкини: — Би Сəлəмəгə гунəйwəти исəнəʒəми, — гуңкини.
A. A. Kanchuga's alphabet	Омо егдигэ багдиэни, мамасахида. Мамасани гээнди бисини. Ту бисити. Бимидэ мамасатиги диаңкини: — Би Сэлэмэгэ гунэивэти исэнэзэми, — гуңкини.
English translation	Once upon a time there was one fellow, he was married. The child's wife was expecting. It was. After a while, he says to his wife: — I'll go and take a look at this Selemege who is being talked about, — he said.

== Bibliography ==
- Atknin, V.A.; Girfanova, A. (1985). Отрицательные формы глаголов в удэгэйском языке (в сравнении с другими тунгусо-маньчжурскими языками) [The negative verbal forms in Udihe (in comparison with other Tungus-Manchu languages)]. Лингвистические Исследования (1): 11–19.
- Girfanova, Albina H. (2002). Udeghe. Lincom Europa. ISBN 3-89586-524-9.
- Nikolaeva, Irina; Tolskaya, Maria (2001). A Grammar of Udihe. Walter de Gruyter. ISBN 978-3-11-016916-4.
- Perekhvalskaya, Elena (2016). Удэгейский язык [Udege language] (PDF). Язык и общество. Энциклопедия [Language and society. Encyclopedia] (in Russian). Мoscow: Азбуковник. pp. 506–513/872. ISBN 978-5-91172-129-9.
- Perekhvalskaya, Elena (28 December 2020). Удэгейский язык: Когда будущее лежит за спиной [Udege language: When the future lies behind]. ПостНаука (in Russian).
- Perekhvalskaya, Elena (2022). Hölzl, Andreas; Payne, Thomas E. (eds.). Tungusic languages: past and present (PDF). Berlin: Language Science Press. pp. 229–262. ISBN 978-3-96110-395-9. OCLC 1356978751. This article incorporates text from this source, which is available under the CC BY 4.0 license.
- Симонов, М. Д.; Кялундзюга, В. Т.; Хасанова, М. М. (1998). Фольклор удэгейцев: ниманку, тэлунгу, ехэ [Folklore of the Udege: nimanku, telungu, yekhe] (PDF). Памятники фольклора народов Сибири и Дальнего востока (Monuments of folklore of the peoples of Siberia and the Far East) (in Russian and ude). Vol. 18. Наука. p. 561. ISBN 5-02-030876-5.
- Shinjiro Kazama (2022). "A grammar of Udihe". 東京外国語大学記述言語学論集 (PDF).
