= Udege =

Udege (or alternatively Udihe, Udekhe, or Udeghe) may refer to:

- the Udege language
- the Udege people
