= O with circumflex (Cyrillic) =

Cyrillic letter

- О̂ о̂

Usage
- Writing system: Cyrillic
- Type: Alphabetic
- Language of origin: Udege language
- Sound values: /ōh/

History
- Time period: 1820, 1827, 1863–1874, 1998–present

O with circumflex (О̂ о̂; О̂ о̂) is a character in the Cyrillic alphabet. The letter was created and in the most common version of the Udege language's alphabet, the Khabarovsk version, used for the northern dialects. This letter has also been used historically in the Ukrainian language, and in some 19th-century publications in the Karelian language.

== Usage ==
- M. O. Maksymovych proposed new letters for usage in the Ukrainian alphabet, based on the etymological principles of spelling to preserve the old writing of Ukrainian. His orthography is known as Maksymovychivka. Of the letters proposed, О̂ was one of them.
- It is formally used in the Rusyn language.
- It was also used in Polish Cyrillic in the 1860s.
- It is also used in some dialects of some South Slavic languages such as Bulgarian and Serbian.
- It was also used in a 1820 publication in Tver Karelian.
- In the northern dialects of Udege, the letter represents a glottalized [o].

== Related letters ==
- O o : Latin letter O
- Ô,ô : Latin letter O with circumflex
- Ô ô : Latin letter Ô - a letter in Slovak and Vietnamese
- О о : Cyrillic letter О
