= A with circumflex (Cyrillic) =

Cyrillic letter Â

Usage
- Writing system: Cyrillic
- Type: Alphabetic

A with circumflex (А̂ а̂; italics: А̂ а̂) is a Cyrillic letter, In all its forms it looks exactly like the Latin letter A with circumflex (Â â Â â), used in the Udege alphabet which was created for the Udege language. The letter was made and used in the most common version of the alphabet: the Khabarovsk version.

== Usage ==
Nineteenth century polymath Mykhailo Maksymovych used an orthography for the Ukrainian language based on etymological principles of spelling, which included the letter А̂ .

This letter is also used in some dialects of South Slavic languages such as Bulgarian and Serbian (e.g. гла̂ва or кра̂к).

== Computing codes ==
Being a relatively recent letter, not present in any legacy 8-bit Cyrillic encoding, the letter А̂ is not represented directly by a precomposed character in Unicode either; it has to be composed as А+◌̂ (U+0302).

Character information
Preview	А		а		̂	
Unicode name	CYRILLIC CAPITAL LETTER A		CYRILLIC SMALL LETTER A		COMBINING CIRCUMFLEX ACCENT	
Encodings	decimal	hex	dec	hex	dec	hex
Unicode	1040	U+0410	1072	U+0430	770	U+0302
UTF-8	208 144	D0 90	208 176	D0 B0	204 130	CC 82
Numeric character reference	&#1040;	&#x410;	&#1072;	&#x430;	&#770;	&#x302;
Named character reference	&Acy;		&acy;			

== Related letters and other similar characters ==
- Â â : Latin letter A with circumflex - a Romanian and Vietnamese letter
- А а : Cyrillic letter A
- А̀ а̀ : Cyrillic letter A with grave
- Ӓ ӓ : Cyrillic letter A with diaeresis
- Ӑ ӑ : Cyrillic letter A with breve
- Cyrillic characters in Unicode
