= Reversed Tse =

Cyrillic letter

- Ꙡ ꙡ
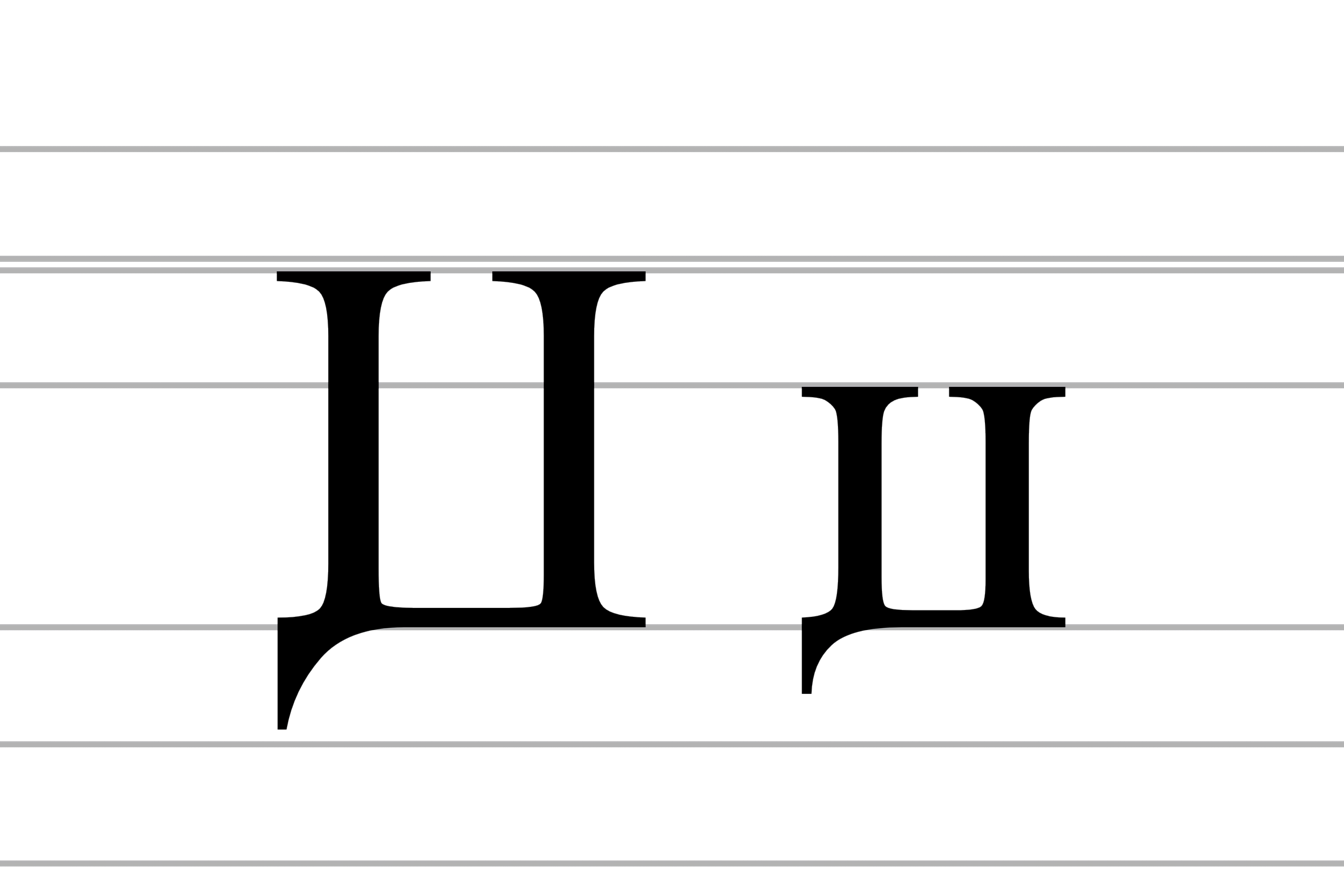

Usage
- Writing system: Cyrillic
- Type: Alphabetic
- Language of origin: Old Novgorod dialect

History
- Development: Ⱌ: Ц ц; Ꙡ ꙡ
- Time period: 11th–15th centuries

Reversed Tse (Ꙡ ꙡ; italics: Ꙡ ꙡ) is a letter of the Cyrillic script, which was used in the Veliky Novgorod birchbark letters in place of tse ц /t͡s/ and che ч /t͡ʃ/, as the distinction between them had been lost in the Old Novgorodian dialect. It is equivalent to neither.

== Example ==
Novgorod birch-bark letter No. 439 (turn of the 13th century):

[моисе]ѧ [ко] спирокоу оже ти не возѧло матее капи воложи
ю со проусомо ко мне ѧзо ти олово попродале и свинеꙡе и
клепание вохо оуже мне не ехати во соужедале воскоу коупле
нꙑ :г: пи а тобе поити соуда воложи олова со ꙡетꙑри безм
ене полотенеꙡа со дова ꙡереленаѧ а коунꙑ прави сопроста

== Computing codes ==
Character information
| Preview | Ꙡ | | ꙡ | |
|---|---|---|---|---|
| Unicode name | CYRILLIC CAPITAL LETTER; REVERSED TSE | | CYRILLIC SMALL LETTER; REVERSED TSE | |
| Encodings | decimal | hex | dec | hex |
| Unicode | 42592 | U+A660 | 42593 | U+A661 |
| UTF-8 | 234 153 160 | EA 99 A0 | 234 153 161 | EA 99 A1 |
| Numeric character reference | &#42592; | &#xA660; | &#42593; | &#xA661; |

== See also ==
- Cyrillic characters in Unicode
