= Iota (Cyrillic) =

Cyrillic letter

- Ꙇ ꙇ
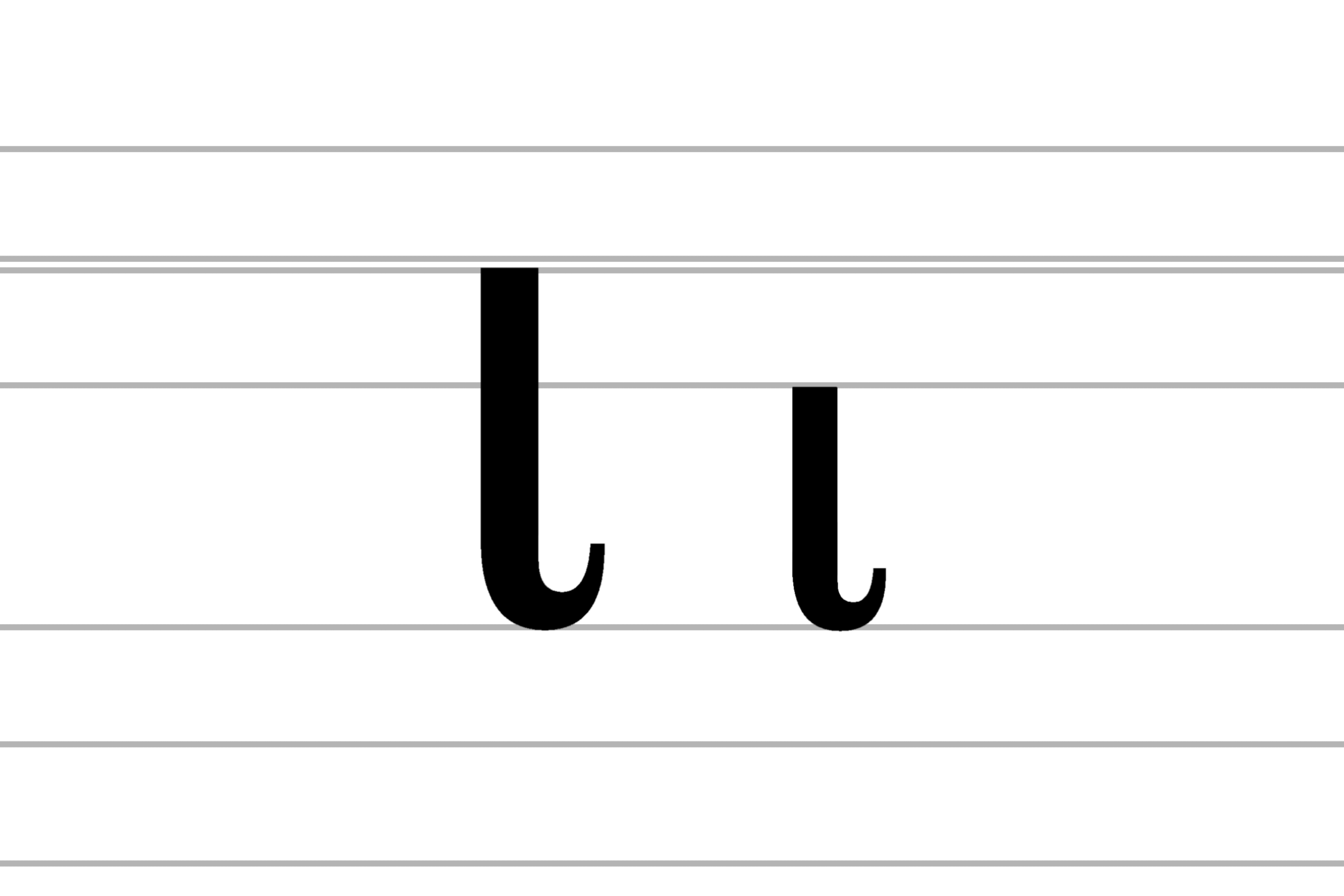

Usage
- Writing system: Cyrillic
- Type: Alphabetic
- Sound values: /i/, /j/

Cyrillic Iota (Majuscule: Ꙇ, Minuscule: ꙇ) is a Cyrillic letter based on the Greek letter Iota, and has been used in scholarly literature since the 10th century in the very first ie. original Cyrillic to transcribe Glagolitic izhe in its word-initial form, Ⰺ. The character was introduced into Unicode 5.1 in April 2008, under the character block Cyrillic Extended-B.

== Computing codes ==
Character information
Preview	Ꙇ		ꙇ	
Unicode name	CYRILLIC CAPITAL LETTER IOTA		CYRILLIC SMALL LETTER IOTA	
Encodings	decimal	hex	dec	hex
Unicode	42566	U+A646	42567	U+A647
UTF-8	234 153 134	EA 99 86	234 153 135	EA 99 87
Numeric character reference	&#42566;	&#xA646;	&#42567;	&#xA647;
