= I with circumflex (Cyrillic) =

Cyrillic letter

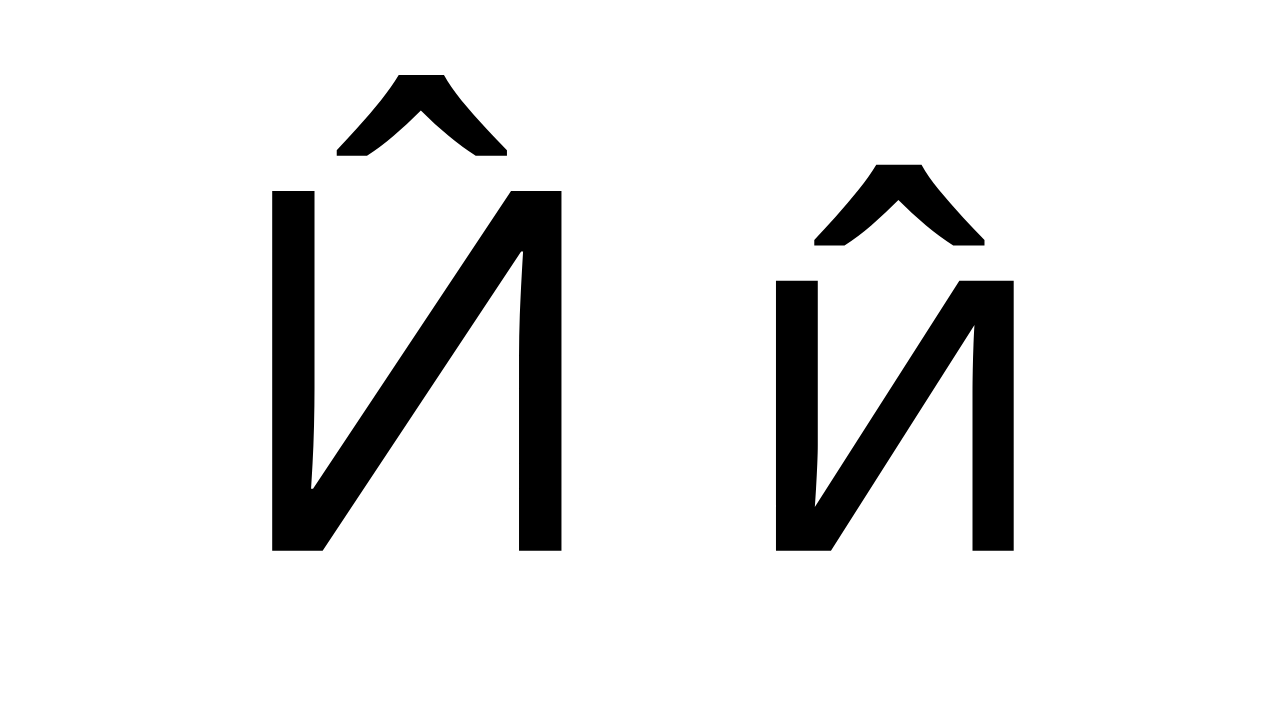

Usage
- Writing system: Cyrillic
- Type: Alphabetic
- Sound values: [īh]

I with circumflex (И̂ и̂; italics: И̂ и̂) is a Cyrillic letter used in the Udege alphabet. The letter was made and used in the most common version of the alphabet: the Khabarovsk version. It was proposed for inclusion in to the Ukrainian alphabet in the 19th century.

== Usage ==
M. O. Maksymovych proposed new letters for usage in the Ukrainian alphabet, based on the etymological principles of spelling to preserve the old writing of Ukrainian. Of the letters proposed, И̂ was one of them.

This letter is also used in some dialects of Bulgarian and Serbian (си̂н).

== Related Letters ==
- И и : Cyrillic letter I
- И́ и́ : Cyrillic letter I with acute
- Й й : Cyrillic letter Short I
- І і : Cyrillic letter Dotted I
- Ї ї : Cyrillic letter Yi
- I i : Latin letter I
- Î î : Latin letter Î - a Romanian letter.
