= Khor (river) =

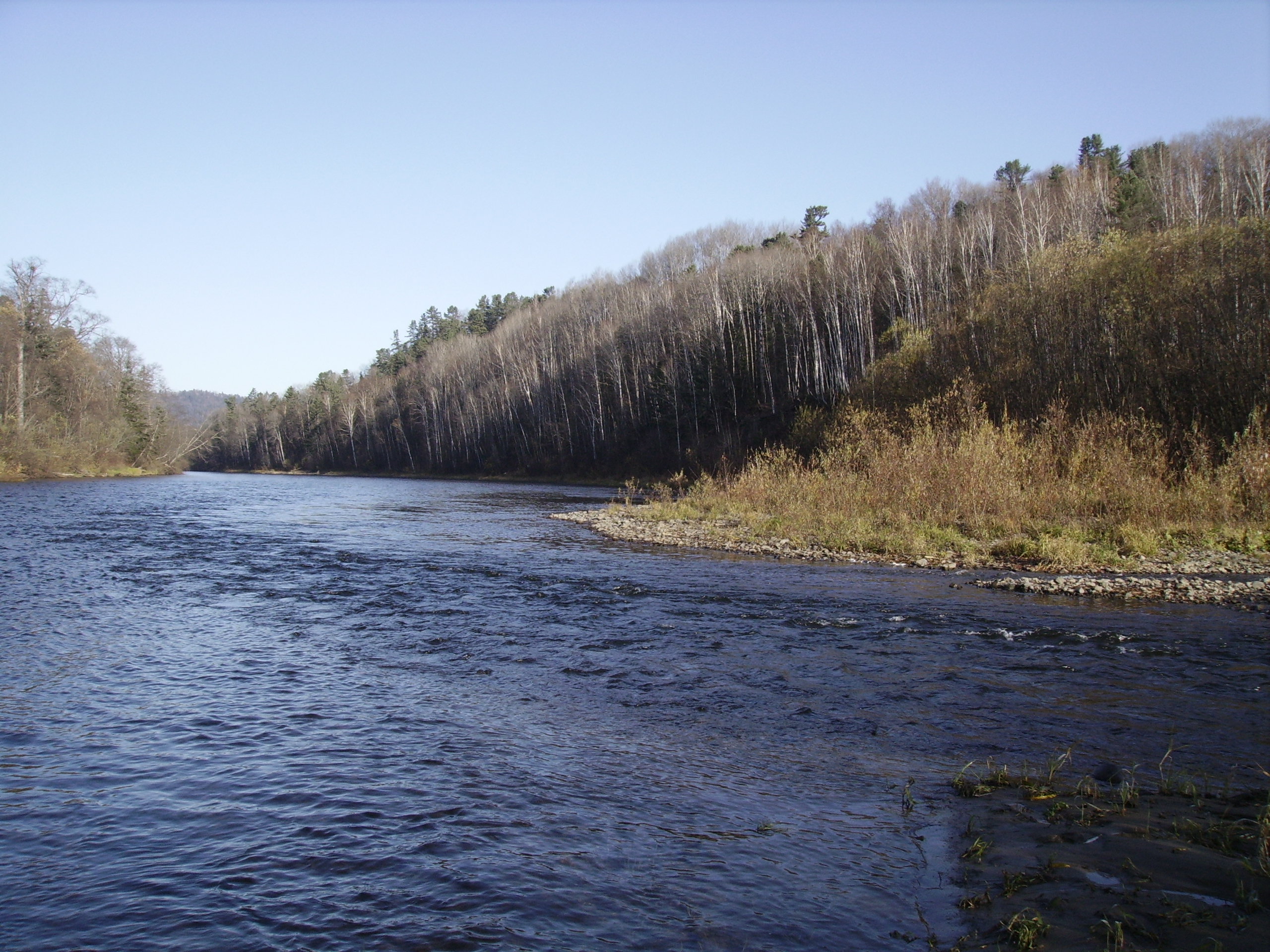

Location
- Country: Russia

Physical characteristics
- Source
  - location: Northern Sikhote-Alin
- Mouth: Ussuri
  - coordinates: 47°49′02″N 134°41′12″E
- Length: 453 km (281 mi)
- Basin size: 24,700 km^{2} (9,500 sq mi)
- Discharge
  - average: 388 m^{3}/s (13,700 cu ft/s)

Basin features
- Progression: Ussuri→ Amur→ Sea of Okhotsk

The Khor (Russian: Хор) is a river in Khabarovsk Krai. It is a right tributary of the Ussuri.

It rises on the western slope of the Northern Sikhote-Alin. The Khor is 453 kilometres (281 mi) long, with a drainage basin of 24,700 square kilometres (9,500 mi^{2}). The urban-type settlement Khor is located on the river bank near the mouth.

Basin of the Amur
