= Cyrillic script =

Writing system

- 1850s Romanian-language text (Lord's Prayer), written with a Romanian variant of the Cyrillic script
- Script type: Alphabet
- Period: Earliest variants exist c. 893 – c. 940
- Direction: Left-to-right
- Languages: See languages using Cyrillic

Related scripts
- Parent systems: Egyptian hieroglyphs: Proto-Sinaitic; Phoenician; Greek (with influence from Glagolitic); Early Cyrillic; Cyrillic script
- Child systems: Old Permic script
- Sister systems: Armenian; Coptic; Latin

ISO 15924
- ISO 15924: Cyrl (220), Cyrillic; Cyrs (Old Church Slavonic variant)

Unicode
- Unicode alias: Cyrillic
- Unicode range: U+0400–U+04FF Cyrillic; U+0500–U+052F Cyrillic Supplement; U+2DE0–U+2DFF Cyrillic Extended-A; U+A640–U+A69F Cyrillic Extended-B; U+1C80–U+1C8F Cyrillic Extended-C; U+1E030–U+1E08F Cyrillic Extended-D
- Names: Belarusian: кірыліца; Bulgarian: кирилица [ˈkirilit͡sɐ]; Macedonian: кирилица [kiˈrilit͡sa]; Russian: кириллица [kʲɪˈrʲilʲɪtsə]; Serbian: ћирилица [t͡ɕirǐlit͡sa]; Ukrainian: кирилиця [kɪˈrɪlɪt͡sʲɐ].

The Cyrillic script (/sɪˈrɪlɪk/ sih-RIL-ik) is a writing system used for various languages across Eurasia. It is the designated national script in various Slavic, Turkic, Mongolic, Uralic, Caucasian and Iranic-speaking countries in Southeastern Europe, Eastern Europe, the Caucasus, Central Asia, North Asia, and East Asia, and used by many other minority languages.

As of 2019, around 250 million people in Eurasia use Cyrillic as the official script for their national languages, with Russia accounting for about half of them. With the accession of Bulgaria to the European Union in 2007, Cyrillic became the third official script of the European Union, following the Latin and Greek alphabets.

The Early Cyrillic alphabet was developed during the 9th century AD at the Preslav Literary School in the First Bulgarian Empire during the reign of Tsar Simeon I the Great, probably by the disciples of the two Byzantine brothers Cyril and Methodius, who had previously created the Glagolitic script. Among them were Clement of Ohrid, Naum of Preslav, Constantine of Preslav, Joan Ekzarh, Chernorizets Hrabar, Angelar, Sava and other scholars. The script is named in honor of Saint Cyril.

== Etymology ==
Since the script was conceived and popularised by the followers of Cyril and Methodius in Bulgaria, rather than by Cyril and Methodius themselves, its name denotes homage rather than authorship.

== History ==
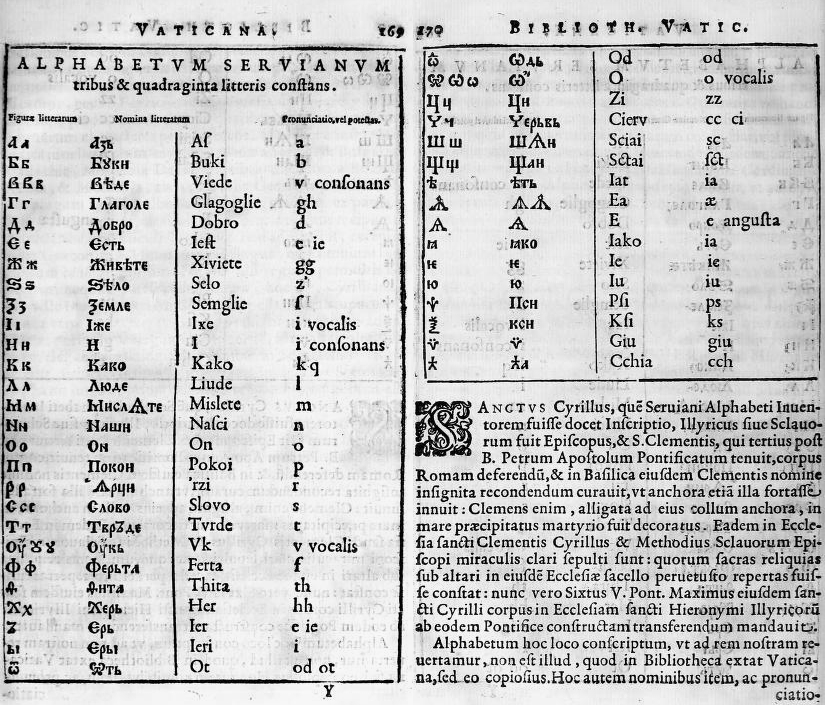
Biblioteca Apostolica Vaticana attributed Cyrillic script to Saint Cyril and Methodius, 16th century

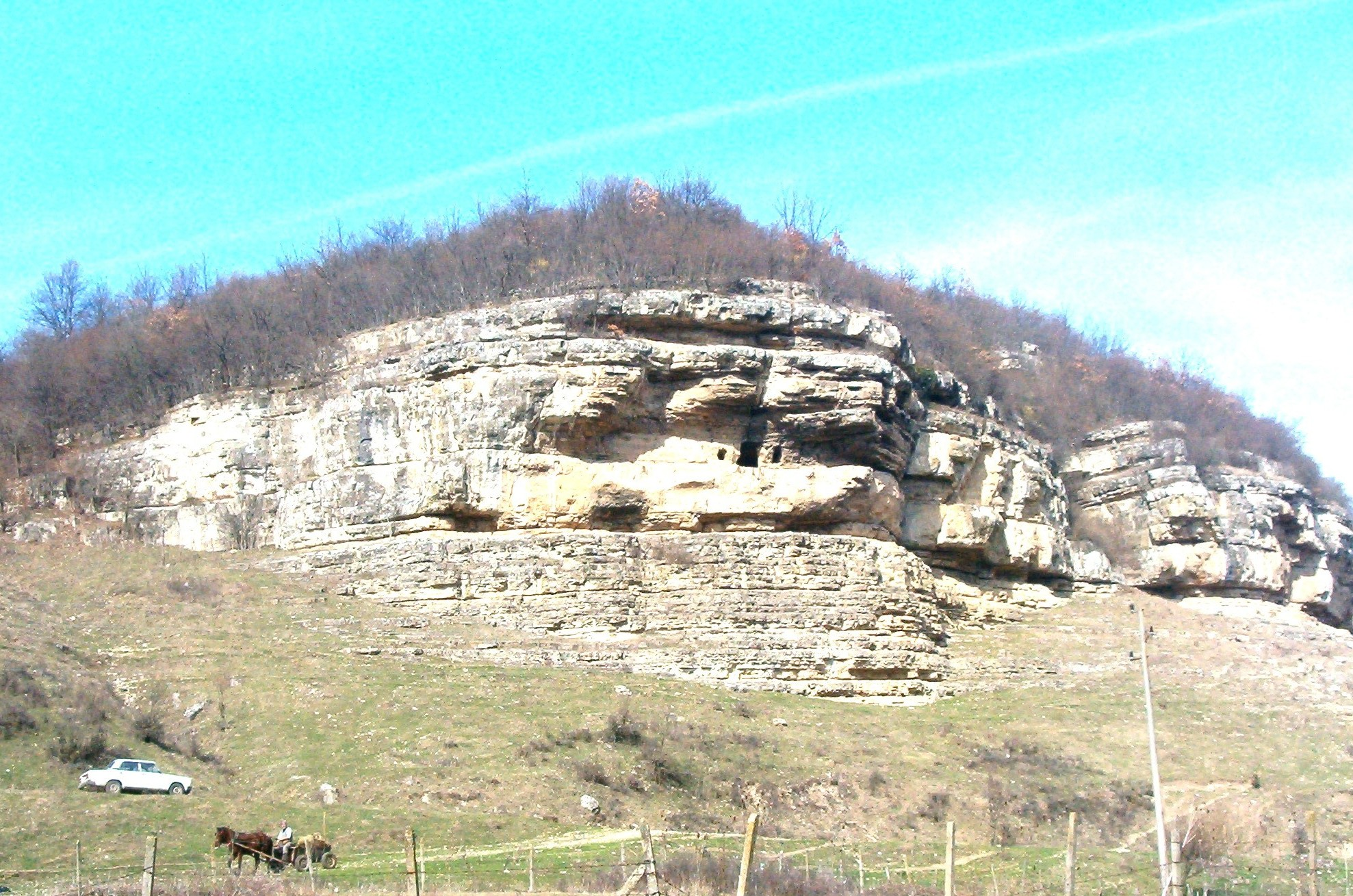
View of the cave monastery near the village of Krepcha, Opaka Municipality in Bulgaria. Found here is the oldest Cyrillic inscription, dated to 921.

The Cyrillic script was created during the First Bulgarian Empire. Modern scholars believe that the Early Cyrillic alphabet was created at the Preslav Literary School, the most important early literary and cultural center of the First Bulgarian Empire and of all Slavs:

Unlike the Churchmen in Ohrid, Preslav scholars were much more dependent upon Greek models and quickly abandoned the Glagolitic scripts in favor of an adaptation of the Greek uncial to the needs of Slavic, which is now known as the Cyrillic alphabet.

A number of prominent Bulgarian writers and scholars worked at the school, including Naum of Preslav until 893; Constantine of Preslav; Joan Ekzarh (also transcr. John the Exarch); and Chernorizets Hrabar, among others. The school was also a center of translation, mostly of Byzantine authors. The Cyrillic script is derived from the Greek uncial script letters, augmented by ligatures and consonants from the older Glagolitic alphabet for sounds not found in Greek. Glagolitic and Cyrillic were formalized by the Byzantine Saints Cyril and Methodius and their Bulgarian disciples, such as Saints Naum, Clement, Angelar, and Sava. They spread and taught Christianity in the whole of Bulgaria. Paul Cubberley posits that although Cyril may have codified and expanded Glagolitic, it was his students in the First Bulgarian Empire under Tsar Simeon the Great that developed Cyrillic from the Greek letters in the 890s as a more suitable script for church books.

Cyrillic spread among other Slavic peoples, as well as among non-Slavic Romanians. The earliest datable Cyrillic inscriptions have been found in the area of Preslav, in the medieval city itself and at nearby Patleina Monastery, both in present-day Shumen Province, as well as in the Ravna Monastery and in the Varna Monastery. The new script became the basis of alphabets used in various languages in Orthodox Church-dominated Eastern Europe, both Slavic and non-Slavic languages (such as Romanian, until the 1860s). For centuries, Cyrillic was also used by Catholic and Muslim Slavs.

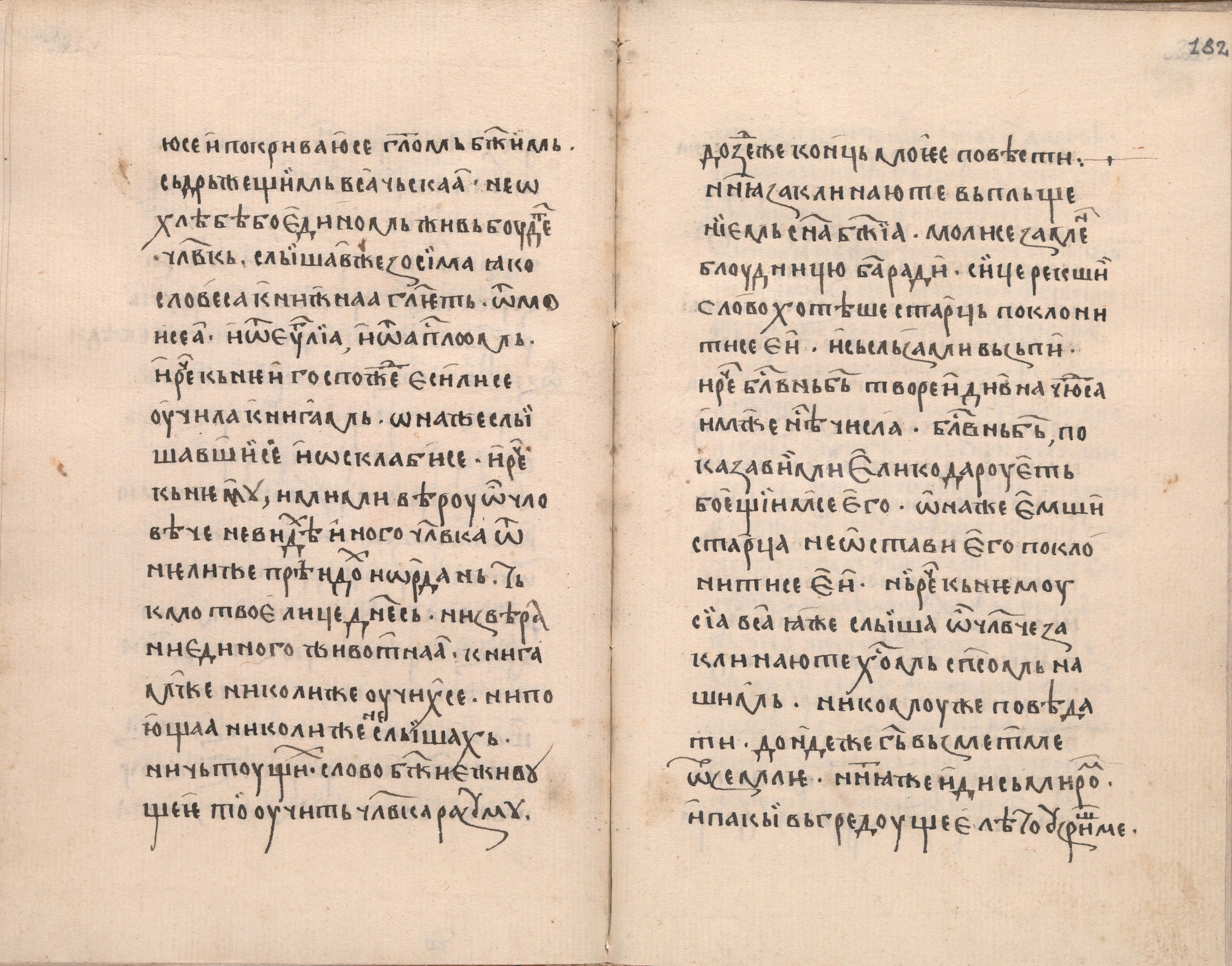
Example of the Cyrillic script. Excerpt from the manuscript "Bdinski Zbornik". Written in 1360.

Cyrillic and Glagolitic were used for the Church Slavonic language, especially the Old Church Slavonic variant. Thus, expressions such as "И is the tenth Cyrillic letter" typically refer to the order of the Church Slavonic alphabet; not every Cyrillic alphabet uses every letter available in the script. The Cyrillic script came to dominate Glagolitic in the 12th century.

The literature produced in Old Church Slavonic soon spread north from Bulgaria and became the lingua franca of the Balkans and Eastern Europe.

Cyrillic in modern-day Bosnia is an extinct and disputed variant of the Cyrillic alphabet that originated in medieval period. Paleographers consider the earliest features of script had likely begun to appear between the 10th or 11th century, with the Humac tablet to be the first such document using this type of script and is believed to date from this period. It was used continuously until the 18th century, with sporadic usage extending into the 20th century.

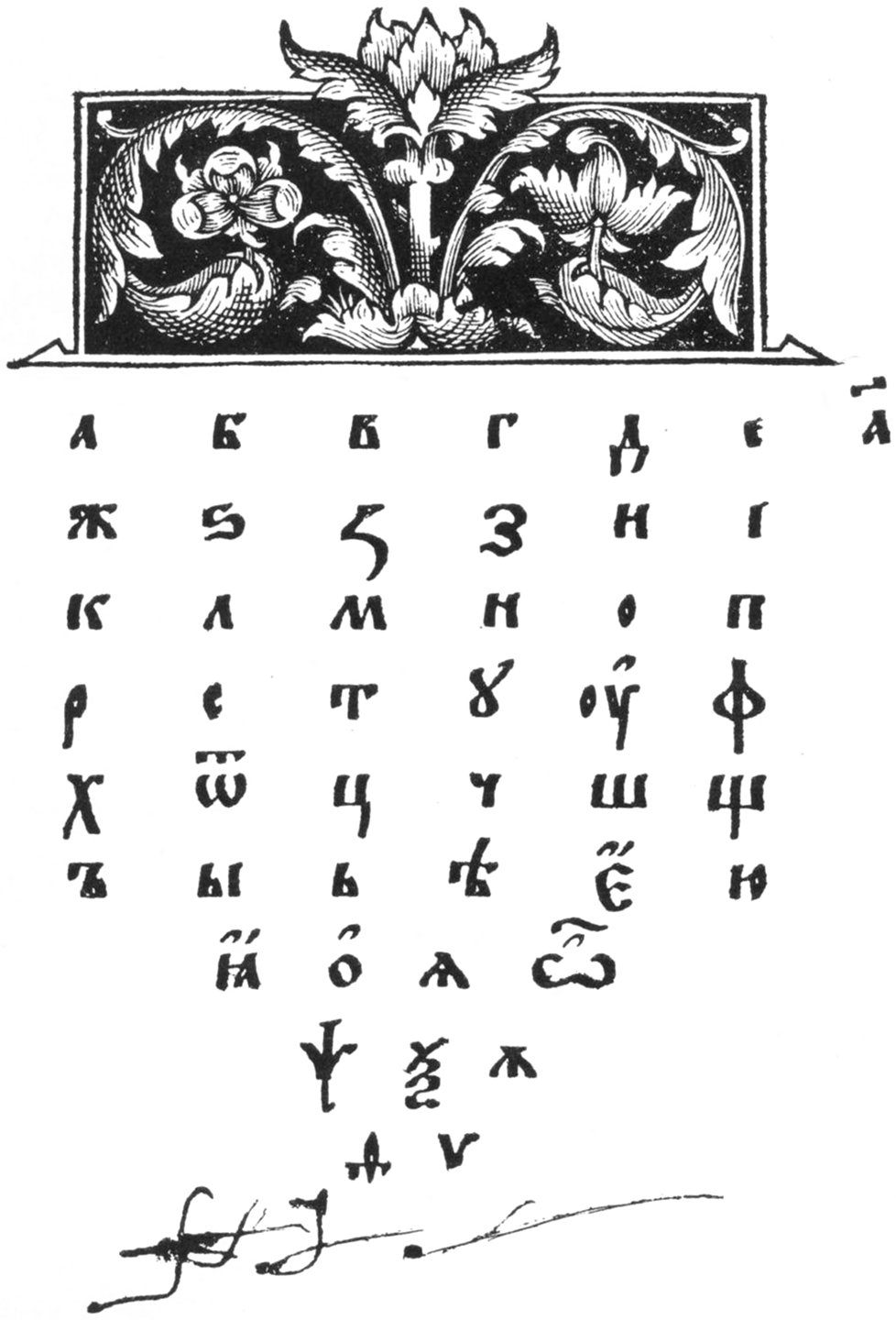
A page from Буквар (alphabet book), the first Old Slavonic textbook, printed by Ivan Fyodorov in 1574 in Lviv. This page features the Cyrillic alphabet.

With the orthographic reform of Saint Evtimiy of Tarnovo and other prominent representatives of the Tarnovo Literary School of the 14th and 15th centuries, such as Gregory Tsamblak and Constantine of Kostenets, the school influenced Russian, Serbian, Wallachian and Moldavian medieval culture. This is known in Russia as the second South-Slavic influence.

In 1708–10, the Cyrillic script used in Russia was heavily reformed by Peter the Great, who had recently returned from his Grand Embassy in Western Europe. The new letterforms, called the Civil script, became closer to those of the Latin alphabet; several archaic letters were abolished and several new letters were introduced designed by Peter himself. Letters became distinguished between upper and lower case. West European typography culture was also adopted. The pre-reform letterforms, called poluustav (Russian: полуустав), were notably retained in Church Slavonic and are sometimes used in Russian even today, especially if one wants to give a text a 'Slavic' or 'archaic' feel.

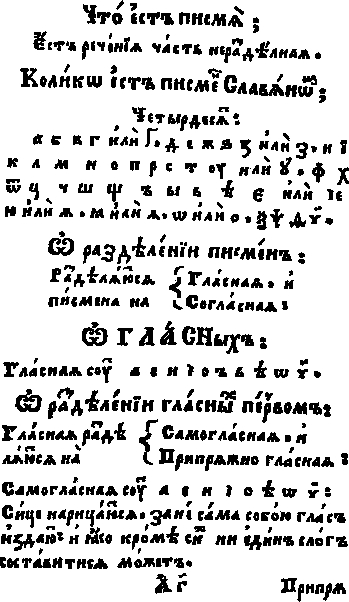
A page from the Church Slavonic Grammar of Meletius Smotrytsky (1619)

The alphabet used for the modern Church Slavonic language in Eastern Orthodox and Eastern Catholic rites still resembles early Cyrillic. However, over the course of the following millennium, Cyrillic adapted to changes in spoken language, developed regional variations to suit the features of national languages, and was subjected to academic reform and political decrees. A notable example of such linguistic reform can be attributed to Vuk Stefanović Karadžić, who updated the Serbian Cyrillic alphabet by removing certain graphemes no longer represented in the vernacular and introducing graphemes specific to Serbian (i.e., Љ Њ Ђ Ћ Џ Ј), distancing it from the Church Slavonic alphabet in use prior to the reform. Today, many languages in the Balkans, Eastern Europe, and northern Eurasia are written in Cyrillic alphabets.

== Letters ==
Cyrillic script spread throughout the East Slavic and some South Slavic territories, being adopted for writing local languages, such as Old East Slavic. Its adaptation to local languages produced a number of Cyrillic alphabets, discussed below.

The early Cyrillic alphabet
А	Б	В	Г	Д	Є (Note: Variant form: E.)	Ж	Ꙃ (Note: Variant forms: Ƨ, Ѕ.)	Ꙁ (Note: Variant form: З.)	И (Note: Early form: Η, which later evolved into И.)	Ї (Note: Variant form: І.)	Ꙉ	К	Л	М	Н (Note: Early form: Ν, which later evolved into Н.)	О (Note: Variant form: Ѻ.)	П	Ҁ	Р	С	Т	ОУ (Note: Variant forms: ОѴ, Ꙋ.)
Ф	Х	Ѡ (Note: Variant forms: Ꙍ, Ѽ.)	Ѿ	Ц	Ч	Ш	Щ	Ъ	ЪI (Note: Variant forms: ЪІ, ЪИ, ЬЇ, Ы, ЬИ.)	Ь	Ѣ	Ꙗ	Ѥ	Ю (Note: Variant form: Ꙕ.)	Ѫ (Note: Variant form: Ꙛ.)	Ѭ	Ѧ (Note: Variant form: Ꙙ.)	Ѩ (Note: Variant form: Ꙝ.)	Ѯ	Ѱ	Ѳ	Ѵ

=== Majuscule and minuscule ===
Capital and lowercase letters were not distinguished in old manuscripts.

Yeri (Ы) was originally a ligature of Yer and I (Ъ + І = Ы). Iotation was indicated by ligatures formed with the letter І: Ꙗ (not an ancestor of modern Ya, Я, which is derived from Ѧ), Ѥ, Ю (ligature of І and ОУ), Ѩ, Ѭ. Sometimes different letters were used interchangeably, for example И = І = Ї, as were typographical variants like О = Ѻ. There were also commonly used ligatures like ѠТ = Ѿ.

=== Numbers ===
The letters also had numeric values, based not on Cyrillic alphabetical order, but inherited from the letters' Greek ancestors.

Cyrillic numerals
1	2	3	4	5	6	7	8	9
А	В	Г	Д	Є (Е)	Ѕ (Ꙃ, Ꙅ)	З (Ꙁ)	И	Ѳ
10	20	30	40	50	60	70	80	90
І (Ї)	К	Л	М	Н	Ѯ (Ч)	Ѻ (О)	П	Ч (Ҁ)
100	200	300	400	500	600	700	800	900
Р	С	Т	Ѵ (Ѵ, Оу, Ꙋ)	Ф	Х	Ѱ	Ѡ (Ѿ, Ꙍ)	Ц (Ѧ)

=== Computer support ===
Computer fonts for early Cyrillic alphabets are not routinely provided. Many of the letterforms differ from those of modern Cyrillic, varied a great deal between manuscripts, and changed over time. In accordance with Unicode policy, the standard does not include letterform variations or ligatures found in manuscript sources unless they can be shown to conform to the Unicode definition of a character: this aspect is the responsibility of the typeface designer.

The Unicode 5.1 standard, released on 4 April 2008, greatly improved computer support for the early Cyrillic and the modern Church Slavonic language. In Microsoft Windows, the Segoe UI user interface font is notable for having complete support for the archaic Cyrillic letters since Windows 8.

=== Currency signs ===
Some currency signs have derived from Cyrillic letters:

- The Ukrainian hryvnia sign (₴) is from the cursive minuscule Ukrainian Cyrillic letter He (г).
- The Russian ruble sign (₽) from the majuscule Р.
- The Kyrgyzstani som sign (^{С}) from the majuscule С (es)
- The Kazakhstani tenge sign (₸) from Т
- The Mongolian tögrög sign (₮) from Т

== Letterforms and type design ==
The development of Cyrillic letter forms passed directly from the medieval stage to the late Baroque, without a Renaissance phase as in Western Europe. Late Medieval Cyrillic letters (categorized as vyaz' and still found on many icon inscriptions today) show a marked tendency to be very tall and narrow, with strokes often shared between adjacent letters.

Peter the Great, Tsar of Russia, mandated the use of westernized letter forms in the early 18th century, in what is known as his civil script. Over time, these were largely adopted in the other languages that use the script. Thus, unlike the majority of modern Greek typefaces that retained their own set of design principles for lower-case letters (such as the placement of serifs, the shapes of stroke ends, and stroke-thickness rules, although Greek capital letters do use Latin design principles), modern Cyrillic types are much the same as modern Latin types of the same typeface family. The development of some Cyrillic computer fonts from Latin ones has also contributed to a visual Latinization of Cyrillic type.

=== Lowercase forms ===
Letters Ge, De, I, Short I, Em, Te, Tse, Be and Ve in upright (printed) and cursive (handwritten) variants. (Top is set in Georgia type, bottom in Odessa Script.)

Cyrillic uppercase and lowercase letter forms are not as differentiated as in Latin typography. Though both Latin and Cyrillic types feature letters whose upper- and lowercase forms differ more in size and proportion than in shape (such as Latin ⟨C c⟩, ⟨V v⟩, ⟨Z z⟩), these form a minority of the Latin alphabet but a majority of Cyrillic (particularly in upright rather than italic forms). Still, a good-quality Cyrillic typeface will include separate small-caps glyphs.

Cyrillic typefaces, as well as Latin ones, have roman and italic forms (practically all popular modern computer fonts include parallel sets of Latin and Cyrillic letters, where many glyphs, uppercase as well as lowercase, are shared by both). However, the native typeface terminology in most Slavic languages (for example, in Russian) does not use the words "roman" and "italic" in this sense. (Note: The Russian name ital'yanskiy shrift (Italian type) refers to a particular typeface family, whereas rimskiy shrift (roman type) is just a synonym for Latin type, Latin alphabet.) Instead, the nomenclature follows German naming patterns:

Alternative variants of lowercase (cursive) Cyrillic letters: Б/б, Д/д, Г/г, И/и, П/п, Т/т, Ш/ш. Default Russian (Eastern) forms on the left. Alternate Bulgarian (Western) upright forms in the middle. Alternate Serbian/Macedonian (Southern) italic forms on the right. See also:

- Roman type is called pryamoy shrift ("upright type") – compare with Normalschrift ("regular type") in German
- Italic type is called kursiv ("cursive") or kursivniy shrift ("cursive type") – from the German word Kursive, meaning italic typefaces and not cursive writing
- Cursive handwriting is rukopisniy shrift ("handwritten type") – in German: Kurrentschrift or Laufschrift, both meaning literally 'running type'
- A (mechanically) sloped oblique type of sans-serif faces is naklonniy shrift ("sloped" or "slanted type").
- A boldfaced type is called poluzhirniy shrift ("semi-bold type"), because there existed fully boldfaced shapes that have been out of use since the beginning of the 20th century.

=== Italic and cursive forms ===
Similarly to Latin typefaces, italic and cursive forms of many Cyrillic letters (typically lowercase; uppercase only for handwritten or stylish types) are very different from their upright roman types. In certain cases, the correspondence between uppercase and lowercase glyphs does not coincide in Latin and Cyrillic types: for example, italic Cyrillic ⟨т⟩ is the lowercase counterpart of ⟨Т⟩ not of ⟨М⟩.

Differences between upright and italic Cyrillic letters of the Russian alphabet; italic forms significantly different from their upright analogues, or especially confusing to users of a Latin alphabet, are highlighted; also available as a graphical image.
upright	а	б	в	г	д	е	ё	ж	з	и	й	к	л	м	н	о	п	р	с	т	у	ф	х	ц	ч	ш	щ	ъ	ы	ь	э	ю	я
italic	а	б	в	г	д	е	ё	ж	з	и	й	к	л	м	н	о	п	р	с	т	у	ф	х	ц	ч	ш	щ	ъ	ы	ь	э	ю	я

Note: in some typefaces or styles, ⟨д⟩, i.e. the lowercase italic Cyrillic ⟨д⟩, may look like Latin ⟨g⟩, and ⟨т⟩, i.e. lowercase italic Cyrillic ⟨т⟩, may look like small-capital italic ⟨T⟩.

In Standard Serbian, as well as in Macedonian, some italic and cursive letters are allowed to be different, to more closely resemble the handwritten letters. The regular (upright) shapes are generally standardized in small caps form.

Mandatory (blue) and optional (green) italic lowercase variants, alongside unique letters (red), in South-European orthography
Russian	а	б	в	г	д	—	е	ж	з	и	й	—	к	л	—	м	н	—	о	п	р	с	т	—	у	ф	х	ц	ч	—	ш	щ	ъ	ы	ь	э	ю	я
Serbian	а	б	в	г	д	ђ	е	ж	з	и	—	ј	к	л	љ	м	н	њ	о	п	р	с	т	ћ	у	ф	х	ц	ч	џ	ш	—	—	—	—	—	—	—
Simulation	а	δ	в	ī	ɡ	ђ	е	ж	з	и	—	ј	к	л	љ	м	н	њ	о	ū	р	с	ш̄	ћ	у	ф	х	ц	ч	џ	ш̱	—	—	—	—	—	—	—

Notes: Depending on fonts available, the Serbian row may appear identical to the Russian row. Unicode approximations are used in the faux row to ensure it can be rendered properly across all systems.

In the Bulgarian alphabet, many lowercase letterforms may more closely resemble the cursive forms on the one hand and Latin glyphs on the other hand, e.g. by having an ascender or descender or by using rounded arcs instead of sharp corners. Sometimes, uppercase letters may have a different shape as well, e.g. more triangular, Д and Л, like Greek delta Δ and lambda Λ.

Differences between Russian and Bulgarian glyphs of upright Cyrillic lowercase letters; Bulgarian glyphs significantly different from their Russian analogues or different from their italic form are highlighted
default	а	б	в	г	д	е	ж	з	и	й	к	л	м	н	о	п	р	с	т	у	ф	х	ц	ч	ш	щ	ъ	ь	ю	я
Bulgarian	а	б	в	г	д	е	ж	з	и	й	к	л	м	н	о	п	р	с	т	у	ф	х	ц	ч	ш	щ	ъ	ь	ю	я
Simulation	а	б	ϐ	ƨ	ɡ	е	жl	ȝ	u	ŭ	k	ʌ	м	н	o	n	р	с	m	у	ɸ	х	u̡	ч	ɯ	ɯ̡	ъ	ƅ	lo	я

Notes: Depending on fonts available, the Bulgarian row may appear identical to the Russian row. Unicode approximations are used in the faux row to ensure it can be rendered properly across all systems; in some cases, such as ж with k-like ascender, no such approximation exists.

=== Accessing variant forms ===
Computer fonts typically default to the Central/Eastern, Russian letterforms, and require the use of OpenType Layout (OTL) features to display the Western, Bulgarian or Southern, Serbian/Macedonian forms. Depending on the choices made by the (computer) font designer, they may either be automatically activated by the local variant locl feature for text tagged with an appropriate language code, or the author needs to opt-in by activating a stylistic set ss## or character variant cv## feature. These solutions only enjoy partial support and may render with default glyphs in certain software configurations, and the reader may not see the same result as the author intended.

== Cyrillic alphabets ==
Among others, Cyrillic is the standard script for writing the following languages:

Slavic languages:

- Belarusian
- Bulgarian
- Macedonian
- Pannonian Rusyn
- Russian
- Rusyn
- Serbo-Croatian (Bosnian, Montenegrin and Serbian)
- Ukrainian

Non-Slavic languages of Russia:

- Abaza
- Adyghe
- Altai
- Avar
- Azerbaijani (in Dagestan)
- Bashkir
- Buryat
- Chechen
- Chuvash
- Erzya
- Ingush
- Kabardian
- Kalmyk
- Karachay-Balkar
- Kildin Sami
- Komi
- Mari
- Moksha
- Nogai
- Ossetian (in North Ossetia–Alania)
- Romani
- Sakha/Yakut
- Tatar
- Tuvan
- Udmurt
- Yuit (Yupik)

Non-Slavic languages in other countries:

- Abkhaz
- Aleut (mostly in church texts)
- Dungan
- Kazakh (to be replaced by Latin script)
- Kyrgyz
- Mongolian (to also be written with traditional Mongolian script)
- Tajik
- Tlingit (only in church texts)
- Turkmen (officially replaced by Latin script)
- Uzbek (generally replaced by Latin script but still used officially)
- Yupik (in Alaska but replaced by Latin script)
- Judaeo-Spanish (almost never used)

The Cyrillic script has also been used for languages of Alaska, Slavic Europe (except for Western Slavic and Slovenian), the Caucasus, the languages of Idel-Ural, Siberia, and the Russian Far East.

The first alphabet derived from Cyrillic was Abur, used for the Komi language. Other Cyrillic alphabets include the Molodtsov alphabet for the Komi language and various alphabets for Caucasian languages.

== Usage of Cyrillic versus other scripts ==
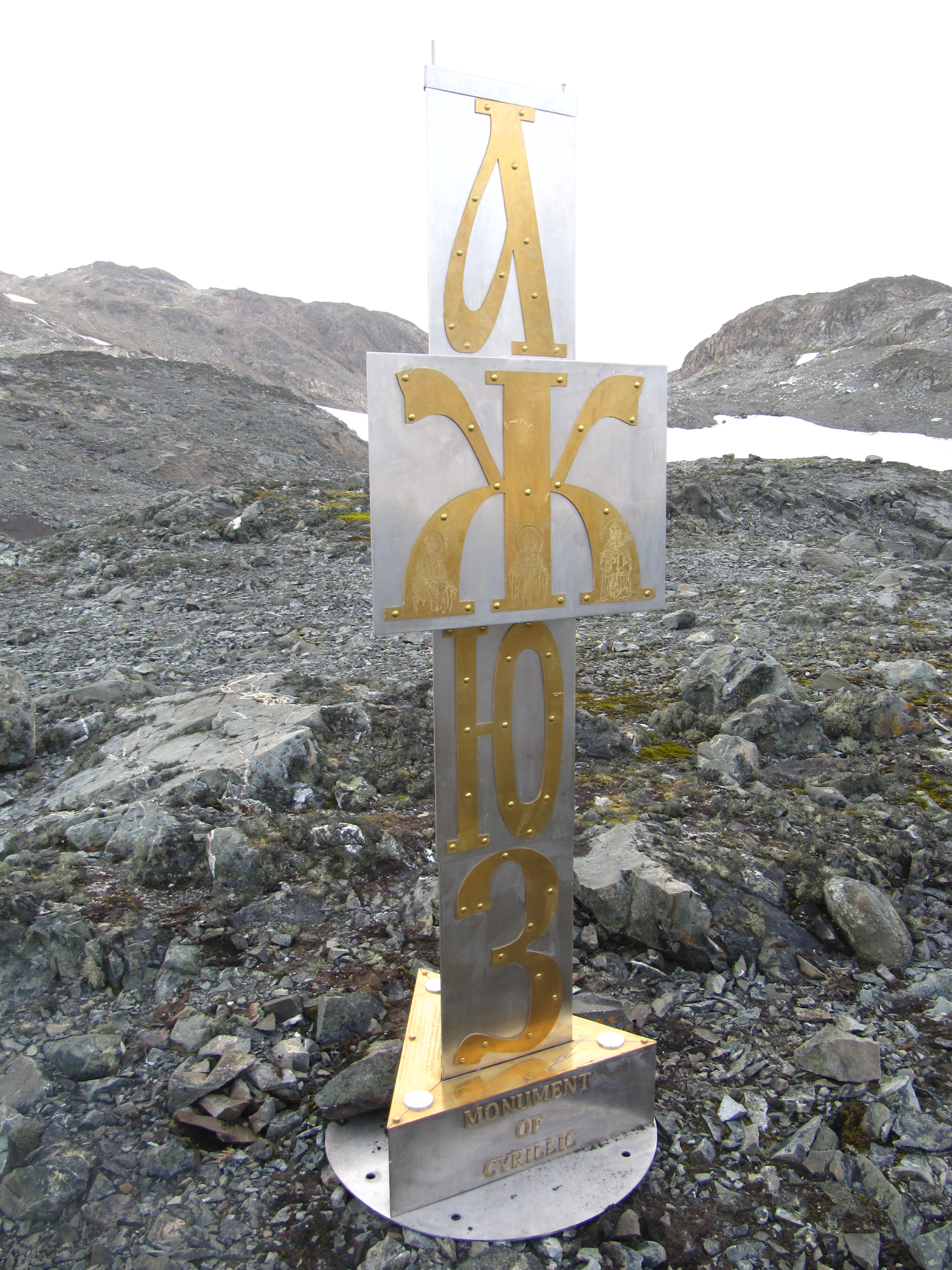
Cyrillic Script Monument in Antarctica near the Bulgarian base St. Kliment Ohridski

=== Latin script ===
A number of languages written in a Cyrillic alphabet have also been written in a Latin alphabet, such as Azerbaijani, Uzbek, Serbian, and Romanian (in the Moldavian SSR until 1989 and in the Danubian Principalities until the early 19th century). After the disintegration of the Soviet Union in 1991, some of the former republics officially shifted from Cyrillic to Latin. The transition is complete in most of Moldova (except the breakaway region of Transnistria, where Moldovan Cyrillic is official), Turkmenistan, and Azerbaijan. Uzbekistan still uses both systems, and Kazakhstan transitioned from Cyrillic to Latin in 2025. The Russian government has mandated that Cyrillic must be used for all public communications in all federal subjects of Russia, to promote closer ties across the federation. This act was controversial for speakers of many Slavic languages; for others, such as Chechen and Ingush speakers, the law had political ramifications. For example, the separatist Chechen government mandated a Latin script which is still used by many Chechens.

Countries with widespread use of the Cyrillic script:
Sole official script
Co-official with another script (either because the official language is biscriptal, or the state is bilingual)
Being replaced with another script, but is still in official use
Legacy script for the official language, or large minority use
Cyrillic is not widely used

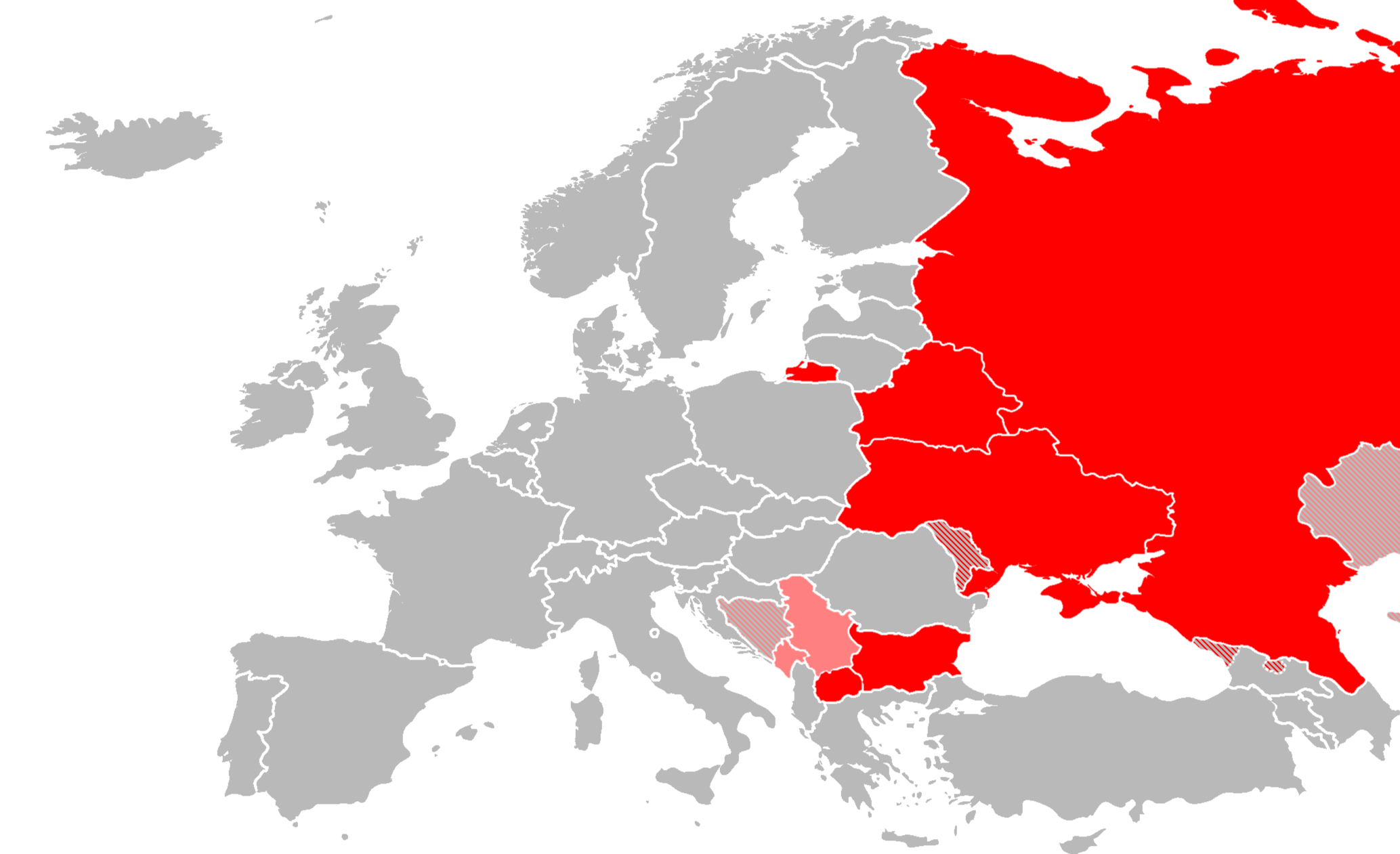
Cyrillic Script in Europe: Sole official script of the official language(s) Co-official script of the official language(s) Striped countries have multiple official languages, one or more of which do not have Cyrillic as an official script.

Standard Serbian uses both the Cyrillic and Latin scripts. Cyrillic is nominally the official script of Serbia's administration according to the Serbian constitution; however, the law does not regulate scripts in standard language, or standard language itself by any means. In practice the scripts are equal, with Latin being used more often in a less official capacity.

The Zhuang alphabet, used between the 1950s and 1980s in portions of the People's Republic of China, used a mixture of Latin, phonetic, numeral-based, and Cyrillic letters. The non-Latin letters, including Cyrillic, were removed from the alphabet in 1982 and replaced with Latin letters that closely resembled the letters they replaced.

=== Romanization ===
There are various systems for romanization of Cyrillic text, including transliteration to convey Cyrillic spelling in Latin letters, and transcription to convey pronunciation.

Standard Cyrillic-to-Latin transliteration systems include:

- Scientific transliteration, used in linguistics, is based on the Serbo-Croatian Latin alphabet.
- The Working Group on Romanization Systems of the United Nations recommends different systems for specific languages. These are the most commonly used around the world.
- ISO 9:1995, from the International Organization for Standardization.
- American Library Association and Library of Congress Romanization tables for Slavic alphabets (ALA-LC Romanization), used in North American libraries.
- BGN/PCGN Romanization (1947), United States Board on Geographic Names & Permanent Committee on Geographical Names for British Official Use).
- GOST 16876, a defunct Soviet transliteration standard. Replaced by GOST 7.79-2000, which is based on ISO 9.
- Various informal romanizations of Cyrillic, which adapt the Cyrillic script to Latin and sometimes Greek glyphs for compatibility with small character sets.

See also Romanization of Belarusian, Bulgarian, Kyrgyz, Russian, Macedonian and Ukrainian.

=== Cyrillization ===
Representing other writing systems with Cyrillic letters is called Cyrillization.

== Summary table ==
Slavic Cyrillic letters
А A	А́ A with acute	А̀ A with grave	А̂ A with circumflex	А̄ A with macron	Ӑ A with breve	Ӓ A with diaeresis	Б Be	В Ve	Г Ge (Ghe)	Ґ Ghe upturn	Д De
Ђ Dje	Ѓ Gje	Е Ye	Е́ Ye with acute	Ѐ Ye with grave	Е̂ Ye with circumflex	Е̄ Ye with macron	Ё Yo	Є Ukrainian Ye	Є́ Ukrainian Ye with acute	Ж Zhe	З Ze
З́ Zje	Ѕ Dze	И I	І Dotted I	І́ Dotted I with acute	Ї Yi	Ꙇ Iota	И́ I with acute	Ѝ I with grave	И̂ I with circumflex	Ӣ I with macron	Й Short I
Ӥ I with diaeresis	Ј Je	К Ka	Л El	Љ Lje	М Em	Н En	Њ Nje	О O	О́ O with acute	О̀ O with grave	О̂ O with circumflex
О̄ O with macron	Ӧ O with diaeresis	П Pe	Р Er	С Es	С́ Sje	Т Te	Ћ Tje	Ќ Kje	У U	У́ U with acute	У̀ U with grave
У̂ U with circumflex	Ӯ U with macron	Ў Short U	Ӱ U with diaeresis	Ф Ef	Х Kha	Ц Tse	Ч Che	Џ Dzhe	Ш Sha	Щ Shcha	Ꙏ Neutral Yer
Ъ Hard sign (Yer)	Ъ̀ Hard sign with grave	Ы Yery	Ы́ Yery	Ь Soft sign (Yeri)	Э E	Э́ E with acute	Ю Yu	Ю́ Yu with acute	Ю̀ Yu with grave	Я Ya
Я́ Ya with acute	Я̀ Ya with grave
Examples of non-Slavic Cyrillic letters (see List of Cyrillic letters for more)
А̊ A with ring	Ә Schwa	Ӛ Schwa with diaeresis	Ӕ Ae	Ғ Ghayn	Ҕ Ge with middle hook	Ӻ Ghayn with hook	Ӷ Ge with descender	Ӂ Zhe with breve	Ӝ Zhe with diaeresis	Ҙ Dhe	Ӡ Abkhazian; Dze
Ҡ Bashkir Qa	Ҟ Ka with stroke	Ӊ En with tail	Ң En with descender	Ӈ En with hook	Ҥ En-ge	О̆ O with breve	Ө Oe	Ҩ O-hook	Ҏ Er with tick	Ҫ The	Ҭ Te with descender
Ӳ U with double acute	Ү Ue	Ұ Kazakh Short U	Ҳ Kha with descender	Ӽ Kha with hook	Ӿ Kha with stroke	Һ Shha (He)	Ҵ Te Tse	Ҷ Che with descender	Ӌ Khakassian; Che	Ҹ Che with vertical stroke	Ҽ Abkhazian; Che
Ҍ Semisoft sign	Ӏ Palochka
Cyrillic letters used in the past
Ѣ Yat	Ꙗ Iotated A	Ѥ Iotated E	Ѧ Small yus	Ѫ Big yus	Ѩ Iotated small yus	Ѭ Iotated big yus	Ѯ Ksi	Ѱ Psi	Ꙟ Yn	Ѳ Fita	Ѵ Izhitsa
Ѷ Izhitsa okovy	Ҁ Koppa	ОУ; Uk	Ѡ Omega	Ѿ Ot

Cyrillic alphabets comparison table
Early/Reference scripts
Greek	Α			Β	Γ		Δ			Ε					Ζ			Η	Θ	Ι				Κ		Λ		Μ		Ν			Ξ	Ο		Π		Ϙ	Ρ		Σ		Τ				Υ			Φ	Χ			Ψ	Ω																									
Church Slavonic	А		Б	В	Г		Д		Ѕ	Е			Ж		З			И	Ѳ	І				К		Л		М		Н			Ѯ	О		П		Ҁ	Р		С		Т				У			Ф	Х			Ѱ	Ѡ	Ц				Ч		Ш		Щ	Ъ	Ы	Ѣ	Ь			Ю	Ꙗ			Ѥ	Ѧ	Ѩ	Ѫ	Ѭ	Ѵ
Most common shared letters
Common	А		Б	В	Г		Д			Е			Ж		З			И					Й	К		Л		М		Н				О		П			Р		С		Т				У			Ф	Х					Ц				Ч		Ш		Щ	Ъ	Ы		Ь	Э		Ю	Я								
South Slavic languages
Bulgarian	А		Б	В	Г		Д		Дз	Е			Ж		З			И					Й	К		Л		М		Н				О		П			Р		С		Т				У			Ф	Х					Ц				Ч	Дж	Ш		Щ	Ъ			Ь			Ю	Я								
Macedonian	А		Б	В	Г		Д	Ѓ	Ѕ	Е			Ж		З			И			Ј			К		Л	Љ	М		Н	Њ			О		П			Р		С		Т		Ќ		У			Ф	Х					Ц				Ч	Џ	Ш																		
Serbian	А		Б	В	Г		Д	Ђ		Е			Ж		З			И			Ј			К		Л	Љ	М		Н	Њ			О		П			Р		С		Т		Ћ		У			Ф	Х					Ц				Ч	Џ	Ш																		
Montenegrin	А		Б	В	Г		Д	Ђ		Е			Ж		З	З́		И			Ј			К		Л	Љ	М		Н	Њ			О		П			Р		С	С́	Т		Ћ		У			Ф	Х					Ц				Ч	Џ	Ш																		
East Slavic languages
Russian	А		Б	В	Г		Д			Е		Ё	Ж		З			И					Й	К		Л		М		Н				О		П			Р		С		Т				У			Ф	Х					Ц				Ч		Ш		Щ	Ъ	Ы		Ь	Э		Ю	Я								
Belarusian	А		Б	В	Г	Ґ	Д	Дж	Дз	Е		Ё	Ж		З					І			Й	К		Л		М		Н				О		П			Р		С		Т				У	Ў		Ф	Х					Ц				Ч		Ш			'	Ы		Ь	Э		Ю	Я								
Ukrainian	А		Б	В	Г	Ґ	Д			Е	Є	Йо	Ж		З			И		І		Ї	Й	К		Л		М		Н				О		П			Р		С		Т				У			Ф	Х					Ц				Ч		Ш		Щ	'			Ь			Ю	Я								
Rusyn	А		Б	В	Г	Ґ	Д			Е	Є	Ё	Ж		З			И		І		Ї	Й	К		Л		М		Н				О		П			Р		С		Т				У			Ф	Х					Ц				Ч		Ш		Щ	Ъ	Ы		Ь			Ю	Я								
Iranian languages
Kurdish	А		Б	В	Г	Г'	Д			Е	Ә	Ә'	Ж		З			И					Й	К	К'	Л		М		Н				О	Ӧ	П	П'		Р	Р'	С		Т		Т'		У			Ф	Х	Һ	Һ'							Ч	Ч'	Ш		Щ				Ь	Э				Ԛ	Ԝ						
Ossetian	А	Ӕ	Б	В	Г	Гъ	Д	Дж	Дз	Е		Ё	Ж		З			И					Й	К	Къ	Л		М		Н				О		П	Пъ		Р		С		Т		Тъ		У			Ф	Х	Хъ				Ц	Цъ			Ч	Чъ	Ш		Щ	Ъ	Ы		Ь	Э		Ю	Я								
Tajik	А		Б	В	Г	Ғ	Д			Е		Ё	Ж		З			И			Ӣ		Й	К	Қ	Л		М		Н				О		П			Р		С		Т				У	Ӯ		Ф	Х	Ҳ								Ч	Ҷ	Ш			Ъ				Э		Ю	Я								
Romance languages
Moldovan (Romanian)	А		Б	В	Г		Д			Е			Ж	Ӂ	З			И					Й	К		Л		М		Н				О		П			Р		С		Т				У			Ф	Х					Ц				Ч		Ш				Ы		Ь	Э		Ю	Я								
Uralic languages
Komi-Permyak	А		Б	В	Г		Д			Е		Ё	Ж		З			И		І			Й	К		Л		М		Н				О	Ӧ	П			Р		С		Т				У			Ф	Х					Ц				Ч		Ш		Щ	Ъ	Ы		Ь	Э		Ю	Я								
Meadow Mari	А		Б	В	Г		Д			Е		Ё	Ж		З			И					Й	К		Л		М		Н	Ҥ			О	Ӧ	П			Р		С		Т				У	Ӱ		Ф	Х					Ц				Ч		Ш		Щ	Ъ	Ы		Ь	Э		Ю	Я								
Hill Mari	А	Ӓ	Б	В	Г		Д			Е		Ё	Ж		З			И					Й	К		Л		М		Н				О	Ӧ	П			Р		С		Т				У	Ӱ		Ф	Х					Ц				Ч		Ш		Щ	Ъ	Ы	Ӹ	Ь	Э		Ю	Я								
Kildin Sami	А	Ӓ	Б	В	Г		Д			Е		Ё	Ж		З			И			Й	Ҋ	Ј	К		Л	Ӆ	М	Ӎ	Н	Ӊ	Ӈ		О		П			Р	Ҏ	С		Т				У			Ф	Х	Һ				Ц				Ч		Ш		Щ	Ъ	Ы	Ь	Ҍ	Э	Ӭ	Ю	Я								
Udmurt	А		Б	В	Г		Д			Е		Ё	Ж	Ӝ	З	Ӟ		И		Ӥ	Й			К	(К̈)	Л		М		Н				О	Ӧ	П			Р		С		Т				У			Ф	Х					Ц				Ч	Ӵ	Ш		Щ	Ъ	Ы		Ь	Э		Ю	Я								
Turkic languages
Azerbaijani	А		Б	В	Г	Ғ	Д			Е	Ә	Ё	Ж		З			И			Ј		Й	К	Ҝ	Л		М		Н				О	Ө	П			Р		С		Т				У		Ү	Ф	Х	Һ				Ц				Ч	Ҹ	Ш		Щ	Ъ	Ы		Ь	Э		Ю	Я								
Bashkir	А		Б	В	Г	Ғ	Д		Ҙ	Е		Ё	Ж		З			И					Й	К	Ҡ	Л		М		Н	Ң			О	Ө	П			Р		С	Ҫ	Т				У		Ү	Ф	Х	Һ				Ц				Ч		Ш		Щ	Ъ	Ы		Ь	Э	Ә	Ю	Я								
Chuvash	А	Ӑ	Б	В	Г		Д			Е	Ё	Ӗ	Ж		З			И					Й	К		Л		М		Н				О		П			Р		С	Ҫ	Т				У	Ӳ		Ф	Х					Ц				Ч		Ш		Щ	Ъ	Ы		Ь	Э		Ю	Я								
Kazakh	А	Ә	Б	В	Г	Ғ	Д			Е		Ё	Ж		З			И		І			Й	К	Қ	Л		М		Н	Ң			О	Ө	П			Р		С		Т				У	Ұ	Ү	Ф	Х	Һ				Ц				Ч		Ш		Щ	Ъ	Ы		Ь	Э		Ю	Я								
Kyrgyz	А		Б		Г		Д			Е		Ё	Ж		З			И					Й	К		Л		М		Н	Ң			О	Ө	П			Р		С		Т				У		Ү		Х									Ч		Ш				Ы			Э		Ю	Я								
Tatar	А	Ә	Б	В	Г		Д			Е		Ё	Ж	Җ	З			И					Й	К		Л		М		Н	Ң			О	Ө	П			Р		С		Т				У		Ү	Ф	Х	Һ				Ц				Ч		Ш		Щ	Ъ	Ы		Ь	Э		Ю	Я								
Uzbek	А		Б	В	Г	Ғ	Д			Е		Ё	Ж		З			И					Й	К	Қ	Л		М		Н				О		П			Р		С		Т				У	Ў		Ф	Х	Ҳ								Ч		Ш			Ъ				Э		Ю	Я								
Mongolian languages
Buryat	А		Б	В	Г		Д			Е		Ё	Ж		З			И					Й			Л		М		Н				О	Ө	П			Р		С		Т				У		Ү		Х	Һ				Ц				Ч		Ш				Ы		Ь	Э		Ю	Я								
Khalkha	А		Б	В	Г		Д			Е		Ё	Ж		З			И					Й	К		Л		М		Н				О	Ө	П			Р		С		Т				У		Ү	Ф	Х					Ц				Ч		Ш		Щ	Ъ	Ы		Ь	Э		Ю	Я								
Kalmyk	А	Ә	Б	В	Г	Һ	Д			Е			Ж	Җ	З			И					Й	К		Л		М		Н	Ң			О	Ө	П			Р		С		Т				У		Ү		Х					Ц				Ч		Ш						Ь	Э		Ю	Я								
Caucasian languages
Abkhaz	А		Б	В	Г	Ҕ	Д	Дә	Џ	Е	Ҽ	Ҿ	Ж	Жә	З	Ӡ	Ӡә	И				Й	К	Қ	Ҟ	Л		М		Н				О	Ҩ	П	Ҧ		Р		С		Т	Тә	Ҭ	Ҭә	У			Ф	Х	Ҳ	Ҳә			Ц	Цә	Ҵ	Ҵә	Ч	Ҷ	Ш	Шә	Щ		Ы														
Sino-Tibetan languages
Dungan	А		Б	В	Г		Д			Е		Ё	Ж	Җ	З			И					Й	К		Л		М		Н	Ң	Ә		О		П			Р		С		Т				У	Ў	Ү	Ф	Х					Ц				Ч		Ш		Щ	Ъ	Ы		Ь	Э		Ю	Я								

- Ё in Russian is usually spelled as Е; Ё is typically printed in texts for learners and in dictionaries, and in word pairs which are differentiated only by that letter (все – всё).

== Computer encoding ==
=== Unicode ===
As of Unicode version 18.0, Cyrillic letters, including national and historical alphabets, are encoded across several blocks:

- Cyrillic: U+0400–U+04FF
- Cyrillic Supplement: U+0500–U+052F
- Cyrillic Extended-A: U+2DE0–U+2DFF
- Cyrillic Extended-B: U+A640–U+A69F
- Cyrillic Extended-C: U+1C80–U+1C8F
- Cyrillic Extended-D: U+1E030–U+1E08F
- Phonetic Extensions: U+1D2B, U+1D78
- Combining Half Marks: U+FE2E–U+FE2F

The characters in the range U+0400 to U+045F are essentially the characters from ISO 8859-5 moved upward by 864 positions. The characters in the range U+0460 to U+0489 are historic letters, no longer used. The characters in the range U+048A to U+052F are additional letters for various languages that are written with Cyrillic script.

Unicode as a general rule does not include accented Cyrillic letters. A few exceptions include:

- combinations that are considered as separate letters of respective alphabets, like Й, Ў, Ё, Ї, Ѓ, Ќ (as well as many letters of non-Slavic alphabets);
- two most frequent combinations orthographically required to distinguish homonyms in Bulgarian and Macedonian: Ѐ, Ѝ;
- a few Old and New Church Slavonic combinations: Ѷ, Ѿ, Ѽ.

To indicate stressed or long vowels, combining diacritical marks can be used after the respective letter (for example, U+0301 ◌́ COMBINING ACUTE ACCENT: е́ у́ э́ etc.).

Some languages, including Church Slavonic, are still not fully supported.

Unicode 5.1, released on 4 April 2008, introduces major changes to the Cyrillic blocks. Revisions to the existing Cyrillic blocks, and the addition of Cyrillic Extended A (2DE0 ... 2DFF) and Cyrillic Extended B (A640 ... A69F), significantly improve support for the early Cyrillic alphabet, Abkhaz, Aleut, Chuvash, Kurdish, and Moksha.

=== Other ===
Other character encoding systems for Cyrillic:

- CP866 – 8-bit Cyrillic character encoding established by Microsoft for use in MS-DOS also known as GOST-alternative. Cyrillic characters go in their native order, with a "window" for pseudographic characters.
- ISO/IEC 8859-5 – 8-bit Cyrillic character encoding established by International Organization for Standardization
- KOI8-R – 8-bit native Russian character encoding. Invented in the USSR for use on Soviet clones of American IBM and DEC computers. The Cyrillic characters go in the order of their Latin counterparts, which allowed the text to remain readable after transmission via a 7-bit line that removed the most significant bit from each byte – the result became a very rough, but readable, Latin transliteration of Cyrillic. Standard encoding of early 1990s for Unix systems and the first Russian Internet encoding.
- KOI8-U – KOI8-R with addition of Ukrainian letters.
- MIK – 8-bit native Bulgarian character encoding for use in MS-DOS.
- Windows-1251 – 8-bit Cyrillic character encoding established by Microsoft for use in Windows. The simplest 8-bit Cyrillic encoding – 32 capital chars in native order at 0xc0–0xdf, 32 usual chars at 0xe0–0xff, with rarely used "YO" characters somewhere else. No pseudographics. Former standard encoding in some Linux distributions for Belarusian and Bulgarian, but currently displaced by UTF-8.
- GOST-main.
- GB 2312 – Principally simplified Chinese encodings, but there are also the basic 33 Russian Cyrillic letters (in upper- and lower-case).
- JIS and Shift JIS – Principally Japanese encodings, but there are also the basic 33 Russian Cyrillic letters (in upper- and lower-case).

=== Keyboard layouts ===
Each language has its own standard keyboard layout, adopted from traditional national typewriters. With the flexibility of computer input methods, there are also transliterating or phonetic/homophonic keyboard layouts made for typists who are more familiar with other layouts, like the common English QWERTY keyboard. When practical Cyrillic keyboard layouts are unavailable, computer users sometimes use transliteration (translit) or look-alike (volapuk encoding) to type in languages that are normally written with the Cyrillic alphabet. Potentially, these proxy versions could be transformed programmatically into Cyrillic at a later date.

== See also ==
- Cyrillic Alphabet Day
- Cyrillic digraphs
- Cyrillic script in Unicode
- Faux Cyrillic, real or fake Cyrillic letters used to give Latin-alphabet text a Soviet or Russian feel
- List of Cyrillic digraphs and trigraphs
- Russian Braille
- Russian cursive
- Russian manual alphabet
- Bulgarian Braille
- Vladislav the Grammarian
- Yugoslav Braille
- Yugoslav manual alphabet

=== Internet top-level domains in Cyrillic ===
- gTLDs
- .мон
- .бг
- .қаз
- .рф
- .срб
- .укр
- .мкд
- .бел
