= Udege people =

Indigenous group in Russian Far East

Udege
Удиэ; Удиһе
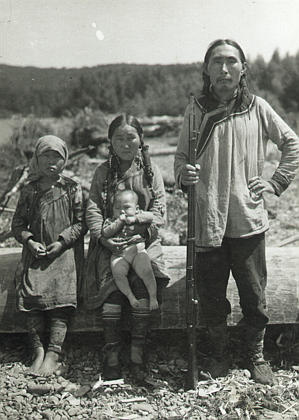

Total population
- 1,538 (2002–2010)

Regions with significant populations
- Russia: Khabarovsk Krai, Primorsky Krai
- Russia: 1,496
- Ukraine: 42

Languages
- Russian; Udege

Religion
- Shamanism

Related ethnic groups
- Nanai people, Oroch people, and other Tungusic peoples

The Udege (Russian: Удэгейцы; Udihe: удиэ or удиһе, or Udihe, Udekhe, and Udeghe correspondingly) are a native people of the Primorsky Krai and Khabarovsk Krai regions in Russia. They live along the tributaries of the Ussuri, Amur, Khungari, Samarga, and Anyuy Rivers. The Udege speak the Udege language, which belongs to the Tungusic language family. Their religious beliefs include animism, animal worship, and shamanism. The Udege are mainly engaged in hunting, fishing, and ginseng harvesting. According to the 2002 census, there were 1,657 Udege in Russia, a slight increase from 1,500 in 1970. This was down to 1,496 Udege in Russia in the 2010 census. They are one of the closest ethnic groups to the Manchu and Nanai, and are possibly of Xi Yeren Jurchen origin.

The Udege of the Samarga River basin had lived in dispersed encampments all along the tributaries of the river until about the 1930s. Under Soviet collectivization the Udege in the area were concentrated in four villages with Agzu being the largest (2010 census about 150).

The largest settlements of Udege are in:

- Khabarovsk krai: Gvasiugi (Imeni Lazo District) and Arsenievo (Nanaysky District)
- Primorsky krai: Agzu (Terneysky District), Krasny Yar and Olon (Pozharsky District)

Since the advent of Perestroika, the Udege, led by Pavel Sulyandziga, have been actively involved in the struggle for control over their traditional territories along the Bikin River. A central objective has been the establishment of a Territory of Traditional Natural Resource Use of federal status, which was proposed in cooperation with the national umbrella organisation RAIPON and the Russian Institute of Anthropology and Ethnography but failed to be approved by the authorities.

According to the 2001 Ukrainian census, out of 40 Udeges living in Ukraine, only 8 declared Udege as their native language. Most of the Udeges in Ukraine indicated Russian (19) or Ukrainian (6) as their native language. 7 of them named another language.

== Ethnonyms ==
Until the end of the 19th and beginning of the 20th century Russian and Western researchers did not separate Udege and Oroch, considering them one people (often called Orochoni). The first who alleged their ethnic separation was S. N. Brailovsky (Russian: Сергей Николаевич Браиловский). He was also the first to introduce the ethnonym Udihe, Udiheitsi (Russian: удээ, удэхэ, удихэ), which became an official, in particular autoethnonym already in the 1930s. Until that time, the Udege did not have a common self-name. Each territorial group had its own self-name: Hungarian – Hungake, Bikinska – Bikinka, Anyuyska – Uninka, and so on.

Also known is the eхonym Udege Kekari (Russian: кекари) — so called Udege neighboring peoples, mainly Orochi and Manchzhur, and this term is sometimes found in Western and Russian literature.

They were called Qiakala (恰喀拉, Manchu: ᡴᡳᠶᠠᡴᠠᡵᠠ kiyakara) by the Qing dynasty.

Settlement of Udege in the Far Eastern Federal District by urban and rural settlements in%, 2010 census

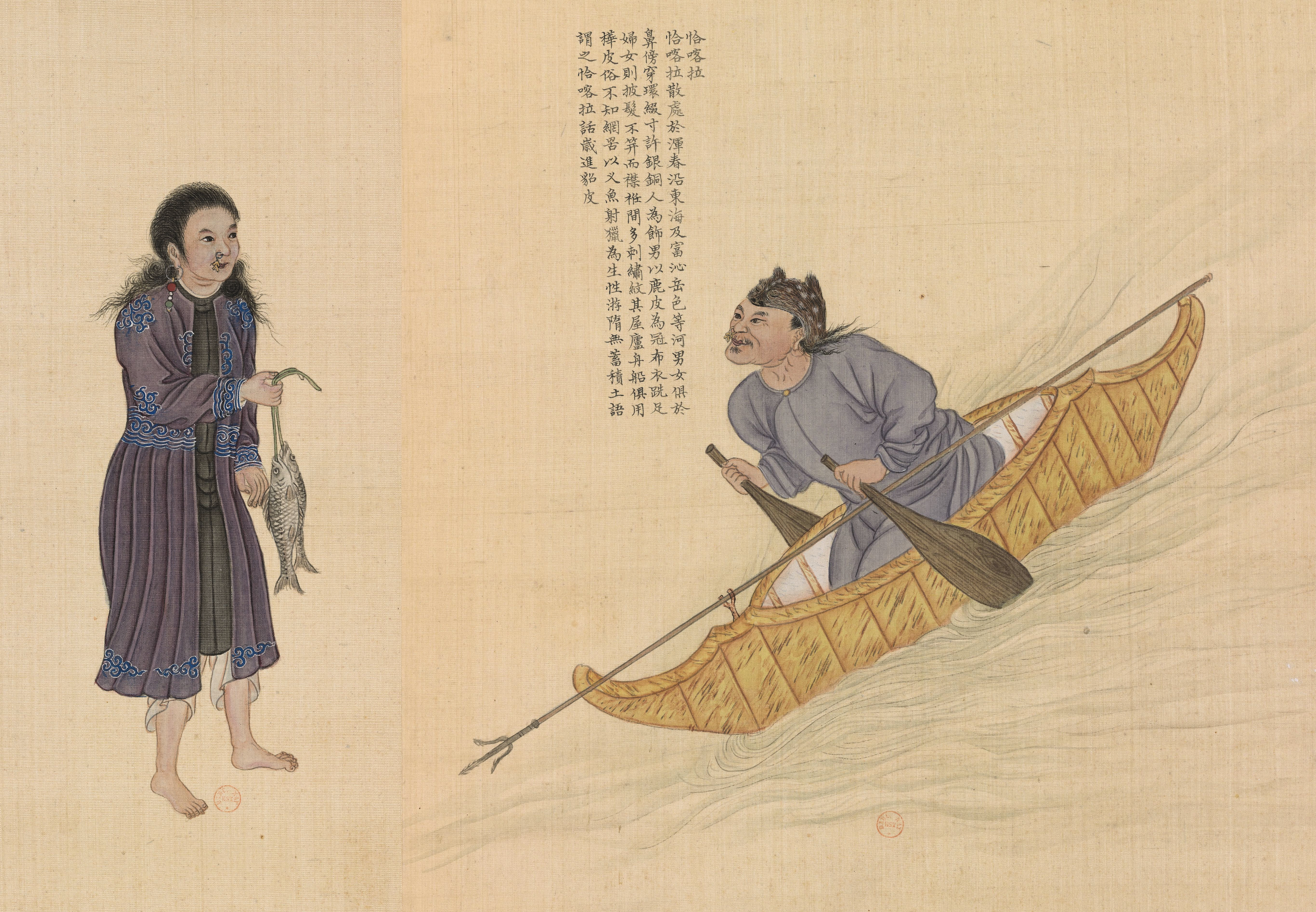
"Qiakala" people (恰喀拉), Qing designation of the Udege. Huang Qing Zhigong Tu, 1769

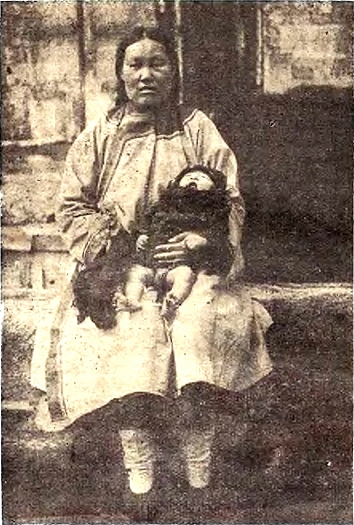
Udege woman

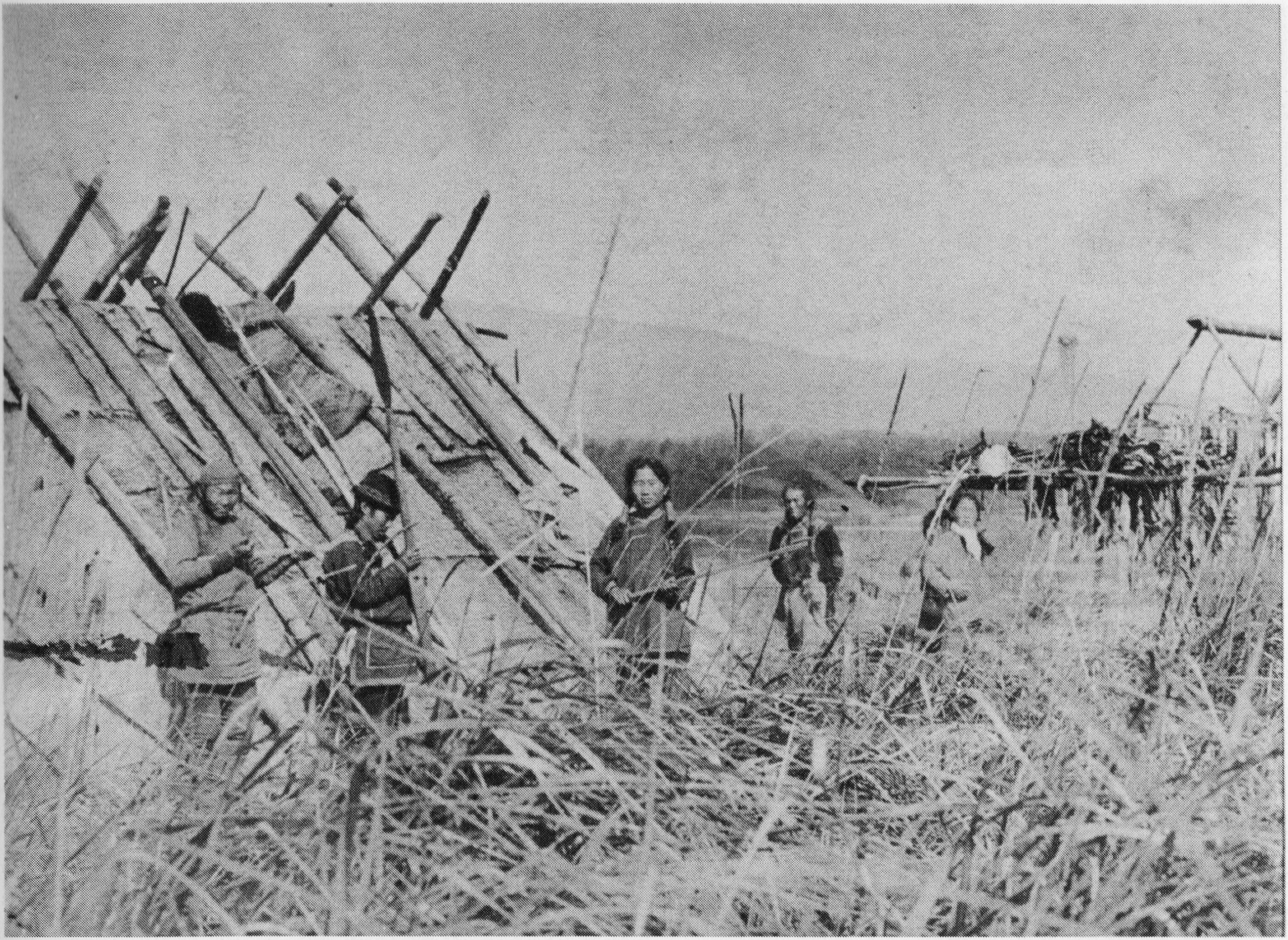
Udege village, 1906
