= Albina Girfanova =

Russian linguist and anthropologist

Albina H. Girfanova
- Born: 1 February 1957; Weimar, East Germany
- Died: 2 February 2018 (aged 61); Saint Petersburg, Russia
- Education: B.A., Saint Petersburg State University, 1981 Ph.D., Institute for Linguistic Studies, Russian Academy of Sciences, 1988
- Occupation: Linguist
- Employer(s): Department of General Linguistics, Saint Petersburg State University, Saint Petersburg

Albina Khakimovna Girfanova (Russian: Альбина Хакимовна Гирфанова) (1 February 1957 – 2 February 2018), was a Russian linguist and anthropologist. She worked at the Institute for Linguistic Studies, Russian Academy of Sciences, and later at Saint Petersburg State University, where she attained the rank of Docent (Associate professor). Girfanova is most known for her work on Udege and Oroch languages, as well as on a number of other Tungusic languages and Balkan languages. She is the author of the most significant vocabulary of Udege, published in Russia, as well as other important studies and reference sources of Udege, Oroch and Balkan languages.

== Early life and education ==
Girfanova was born in Weimar, which was then a city in East Germany (DDR), where her family was, probably, stationed at this time, working with the Soviet military. Later family moved to Saint Petersburg, and Girfanova started her undergraduate studies at the Department of General Linguistics (Faculty of Philology) at the Saint Petersburg State University. She majored in Albanian philology at the chair of Albanian language and literature, established at 1957 by initiative of Agnia Vasilevna Desnickaja. Albina Girfanova formed as a philologist and albanologist under the guidance of professors A. V. Desnickaja, G. I. Entrej, I. I. Voronina, etc. She graduated from the Saint Petersburg State University, majoring in Albanian, in 1981. However, she did not continue studies in Albanian, but joined Department of Altaic languages at the Leningrad Branch of the Institute for Linguistic Studies, Russian Academy of Sciences, in Saint Petersburg (at that time, Leningrad), and devoted herself to study of Tungusic languages and cultures of Tungusic peoples.

== Academic career ==
=== Writing and research ===
==== Fellowship at Institute for Linguistic Studies (1981–1983) ====
Immediately upon graduation from Saint Petersburg State University Girfanova obtained a fellow position as a junior researcher (стажер-исследователь) at the department of Altaic languages at the Institute for Linguistics Studies of the Russian Academy of Sciences (in years 1952 – 1991: the Leningrad branch of Institute of Linguistics of the Academy of Sciences of the USSR). She majored in Albanian at college, but switched to studying Tungusic languages, primarily Udege and Oroch. At the same time, she continued studying Turkish and Albanian, modern Greek – in time being, she became a veritable polyglot.

==== Post-graduate studies at Institute for Linguistic Studies (1983–1986) ====
After three years as a junior researcher, Girfanova secures a post-graduate position in her department. In the Soviet Academy's context at that time, successful graduation from this position practically guaranteed a life-time tenure with the institution; therefore, obtaining such position in the humanities at that time was considered a career success. Girfanova publishes several articles on Udege language. Upon graduation from her post-graduate studies, she is promoted to research fellow position at the same department.

==== Research at Institute for Linguistic Studies (1986–2003) ====
It took another two years for Girfanova to write and defend her Candidate of Science Dissertation (equivalent of PhD. thesis), entitled "Indicative Verb Forms in Udege Language", in 1988. The pinnacle of her studies of Udege language becomes the most significant "Vocabulary of Udege Language", published in Russia.

===== Lexicographic studies =====
Girfanova has invested considerable time into lexicography of Udege and Oroch languages. She will be mostly known as the author of the best "Vocabulary of Udege Language". It is not the first and only vocabulary of Udege language, but, according to the review by A. A. Byrykin, it is the most linguistically solid vocabulary of Udege. Her lexicographic and etymological studies were not limited to Tungusic languages. She studied cross-linguistic connections of Balkan toponyms, etc. She was working on a project of a dictionary of Turkic terminology in the languages of Southeast Europe.

===== Grammar and Syntax studies =====
Alongside time-consuming lexicographic work, Girfanova continued grammatical and syntactic studies of Tungusic languages, and devoted some time to the history of studying of these languages.

===== Anthropology studies =====
Girfanova's interest to Tungusic peoples was not limited by language studies. She conducted folkloristic and ethnographic studies (marriage rites, kinship terminology), including study of shamanism. Girfanova was a member of International Society for Shamanistic Research.

=== Teaching and lecturing ===
==== Department of General Linguistics, Saint Petersburg State University ====
While in the Soviet Union position of a researcher at an institute of the Academy of Sciences used to be a life-time tenure position, there was no job security in the new Russia, and financing of the Academy decreased dramatically. In 2003, changes happened at Institute for Linguistic Studies, the Altaic department effectively stopped to exist, and Girfanova was let go. That was, in her own words in 2005, a painful crisis of her academic career: "two years ago the author, the only specialist in Udege language in the country, was fired from the Altaic department of ILI of RAS living out the rest of its days, abandoned by researchers and later abolished, in spite of the position of a scientific researcher successfully acquired three months before the department’s abolishment (I am the author of the only thesis of C. Sc. devoted to Udege language, written and defended in this country, 70 publications, including 5 monographs on the mentioned above Udege language)". Fortunately, she was immediately hired by her alma mater, Saint Petersburg State University, as an associate professor (docent). Unfortunately, she had to revert to teaching Albanian and Turkish languages, which considerably diminished time for academic research and publications.

==== Courses and lectures ====
- Albanian (workshop)
- Theoretical grammar of Albanian
- Turkish language (workshop)
- General linguistics (for foreign students)
- Translation theory

=== Educator, Cultural Ambassador and Linguistic Activist ===
Girfanova did not only teach Tungisic and Balkan languages, she is also an author of popular books, presenting Udege and Albanian cultures to the world, so she was honoured by an obituary from Albanian Embassy in Russia - it is not something that done for a regular language professor. Beside being an academic scholar, she gave full assistance to the educational system in Russia, to educate students in Tungusic languages, publishing a few textbooks for elementary school. She was really concerned about well-being of endangered Tungusic languages, and was socially active to help them to survive. As Oliver Corff mentioned in his obituary for Girfanova, "Her critical understanding of the intentions and outcomes of Russia’s minority policies allowed her to come forward with substantial suggestions for improvements acknowledged by politicians. In autumn 2017 she was invited by the Department of Interior Politics of Primorsky Krai as moderator for a course on the revival of the Udege language in the framework of a larger nationality policy programme from 2018 to 2020. Pavel Yasevich, Director of the Department, lauds her as the foremost authority on Udege and Oroch languages in Russia."

== Death ==
Girfanova died on February 2, 2018, the day after her 61st birthday.

== Membership in Academic Societes ==
- International Society for Dialectology and Geolinguistics (SIDG)
- International Society for Shamanistic Research.

== Selected works ==
=== Books ===
- Гирфанова, Альбина (2001). Словарь удэгейского языка. СПб.: «Наука». ISBN 9785020285200. (in Russian)
- Гирфанова, Альбина (2002). Удэгейско-русский и русско-удэгейский словарь. Пособие для уч-ся нач. шк. СПб.: «Дрофа». ISBN 5-94745-088-7. (in Russian)
- Гирфанова, Альбина (2002). Удэгейский язык в таблицах. СПб.: «Дрофа». ISBN 5-94745-088-7. (in Russian)
- Гирфанова, Альбина; Воронина, И.И. (2002). Албания. СПб.: «Европа». (in Russian)
- Girfanova, Albina (2002). Udeghe. München; Newcastle: Lincom Europa. ISBN 9783895865244. OCLC 50993450.

=== Articles ===
- Atknin, V.A.; Girfanova, Albina (1985). "Отрицательные формы глаголов в удэгэйском языке (в сравнении с другими тунгусо-маньчжурскими языками)/The negative verbal forms in Udihe (in comparison with other Tungus-Manchu languages)". Лингвистические Исследования (1): 11–19.
- Гирфанова, Альбина; Сухачев, Н. Л. (1993). "Заметки по балканской топонимии тюркского происхождения (Арджеш, Артан, Балабанци и др.)". In Казанский, Н. Н. (ed.). Studia Linguistica et Balcanica: Памяти Агнии Васильевны Десницкой (1912–1992). Vol. 2–3. СПб.: Центр «Петербургское востоковедение». pp. 195–207. (in Russian)
- Girfanova, Albina (1993). "Shamanism among the Udeghe". Shamanism and performing arts. Papers and abstracts for the 2nd Conference of the International Society for Shamanistic Research. Budapest. pp. 31–36.
- Альбина Гирфанова (1994). "Удэгейский язык". Красная книга языков народов России: Энциклопедический словарь-справочник. М.: 57–58. (in Russian)
- Альбина Гирфанова (1994). "Орочский язык". Контактологический энциклопедический словарь-справочник: Северный регион. Языки народов Севера, Сибири и Дальнего Востока в контактах с русским языком (1). М. (in Russian)
- Альбина Гирфанова (1994). "Удэгейско-русские языковые связи". Красная книга языков народов России: Энциклопедический словарь-справочник. М. (in Russian)
- Альбина Гирфанова (1994). "Орочско-русские языковые связи". Красная книга языков народов России: Энциклопедический словарь-справочник. М. (in Russian)
- Girfanova, Albina (1995). "Mbi leksikun autokton nё gjuhёn shqipe dhe nё gjuhёt romane-lindore". Seminari ndёrkombёtar pёr gjuhёn, letersine dhe kulturen shqiptare. Pёrmbledhje e ligjeratëve dhe e kumtësave të lexuara nё Seminarёt XV e XVI. 1989 e 1990. Prishtinё. pp. 95–97.
- Альбина Гирфанова (1996). "Словарь удэгейского языка (общие сведения)". Гуманитарные науки в России. Соросовские лауреаты. Материалы всероссийского конкурса научно-исследовательских проектов в области гуманитарных наук. СПб.: 284–287. (in Russian)
- Альбина Гирфанова (1997). "Удэгейский язык. Проблемы описания современного статуса". Малочисленные народы Севера, Сибири и Дальнего Востока: Проблемы сохранения и развития языков. СПб.: 88–100. (in Russian)
- Albina Girfanova (2000). "Bektashizmi nё Shqipёri". Shekulti. 2 (10). Tiranё. (in Albanian)
- Альбина Гирфанова (2000). "Удэгейские термины родства". Алгебра родства. 1. СПб.: «Наука»: 271–278. (in Russian)
- Альбина Гирфанова (2000). "Удэгейский фольклор". Северная энциклопедия. М. (in Russian)
- Гирфанова, Альбина (2001). "Тюркские этносы раннего средневековья в юго-восточной Европе (к проблеме тюркских «заимствований»)". In Казанский, Н. Н. (ed.). Studia Linguistica et Balcanica: Памяти Агнии Васильевны Десницкой (1912–1992). СПб.: «Наука». pp. 256–265. (in Russian)
- Гирфанова, Альбина (2003). "Из истории удэгейской лексикографии (к описанию лексики языка агглютинативного типа)". In Долинин, К. А. (ed.). Лингвистика. История лингвистики. Социолингвистика: Проблемы современного теоретического и синхронно-описательного языкознания. Vol. 5. СПб.: Изд. С.-Петерб. ун-та. pp. 88–98. (in Russian)
- Girfanova, Albina (2003). "Rreth çёshtjes sё standardizmut të gjuhёs shqipe". In Bulo, J.; Lafe, E.; Monsoki, J.; Hyss, E. (eds.). Konference shqёheora shqipja standarde dhe shiqёrore shqiptire sot. Tiranё. pp. 256–265.
- Гирфанова, Альбина (2003). "Из истории изучения удэгейского языка". In Jonhunen, Juha; Parpola, Asco (eds.). Remota Relata. Essays on the History of Oriental Studies in Honour of Harry Halén (Studia orientalia). Helsinki: Finnish Oriental Society. (in Russian)
- Girfanova, Albina (2003). "Shamanism in the Life of Udeghe". The 7 Conference of International Society for Shamanism Research (ISSR). Abstracts of the Papers. Beijing: ISSR. pp. 31–32.
- Girfanova, Albina (2003). "Minority Languages in Modern Russia". In Osohito, Miyaoka; Fubito, Endo (eds.). Languages of the North Pacific Rim. Osaka: Osaka Gakuin Univ. pp. 69–77.
- Girfanova, Albina (2005). "The Present Day Situation of the Udege and Oroch Languages". Endangered Languages of Indigenous Peoples of Siberia. Saint Petersburg: Department of the North and Siberia, IEA RAS.
- Albina Girfanova (2007). "О проекте словаря "Тюркизмы в языках юго-восточной Европы" (опыт сводного описания историко-лексикографических и этимологических данных". Revue des études sud-est européennes. XLV (1–4): 461–490.
- Girfanova, Albina (2013). ""The Taz Ethnic Group: Its Past and Future"". In Hyytiäinen, Tiina; Jalava, Lotta; Saarikivi, Janne; Sandman, Erika (eds.). Ex Oriente Lumina. Historiae Variae Multiethnicae. Festskrift tillägnad Juha Janhunen. Ленинград: ISSR. pp. 31–32.

=== Dissertation ===
- Гирфанова, Альбина Хакимовна (1988). Индикативные формы глагола в удэгейском языке : автореферат дис. кандидата филологических наук : 10.02.02. АН СССР. Ленингр. отд-ние ин-та языкознания. (in Russian)
