= Udege alphabets =

Alphabets for Udege, a Tungusic language

Udege alphabets are the alphabets used to write the Udege language. During its existence, it functioned on different graphic bases and was repeatedly reformed. Currently, the Udege script functions on two versions of the Cyrillic alphabet for two emerging literary languages, but does not have a generally accepted norm. There are 2 stages in the history of Udege writing:

- 1931—1937 - writing on the Latin basis;
- since the late 1980s - modern writing based on Cyrillic.

== Preliterate period ==
The first reliably known fixation of the Udege language material was made in 1859 by the naturalist Richard Maack, who wrote down several local names of animals in Cyrillic in this language. In the 1880s - 1890s, Ivan Nadarov and Sergey Brailovskiy compiled the first dictionaries in which Udege words were also written in Cyrillic. Words were recorded by ear and their phonetic appearance is very inaccurate. Since 1906, a great deal of work on fixing the Udege language has been carried out by Vladimir Arsenyev. In his notes, mostly unpublished, he used the Cyrillic alphabet with diacritics. So, to denote pharyngealization, he used a double superscript sign ⁀̇ (an arc with a dot on top). Arsenyev's recordings are judged by experts to be much more accurate than those of his predecessors. Also at the beginning of the 20th century, the Udege language material was collected by Pyotr Shmidt and Stanisław Poniatowski. However, proper Udege writing did not emerge at that time.

== Latin alphabet ==
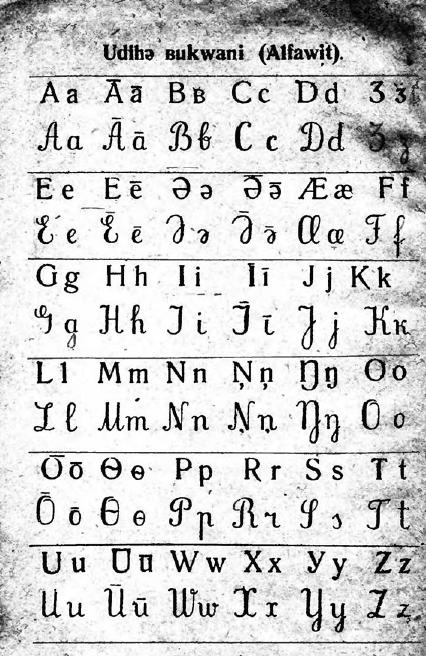
Udege alphabet from the primer of 1932

In the 1920s-1930s, the USSR was in the process of creating scripts for previously non-literate peoples. In 1931, a draft of the first Udege alphabet based on a Latin graphic was published. The author of this alphabet was Yevgeny Shneider. According to the initial draft, the alphabet included the following characters: Aa Bb Çç Dd Ee Әә Ff Gg Hh Ꜧꜧ Ii Jj Kk Ll Mm Nn Ŋŋ Oo Pp Rr Ss Tt Uu Ww Xx Ӡӡ. In 1932, on a slightly modified version of the Udege alphabet, the first book in the Udege language was published - the primer "Minti oņofi" (Our Literate) - compiled by Shneider. He also wrote other Udege books written or translated in the 1930s. The Latin alphabet of the Udege continued to function until 1937.

== Cyrillic alphabets ==
External image
- The first page of Jhansi Kimonko's handwritten primer

In the second half of the 1930s, the process of transferring scripts to the Cyrillic basis began in the USSR. On March 7, 1937, the Presidium of the Central Executive Committee approved a resolution on the approval of new alphabets for the peoples of the North. This decree also approved the Udege alphabet based on the Cyrillic alphabet, which contained all the letters of the Russian alphabet except Щ щ and Ъ ъ, as well as an apostrophe. However, only one book was published in this alphabet - a translation of the textbook of arithmetic (Арифметика. Тэнэдэлуи школа татусинкуни). After that, the functioning of the written Udege language in regulated areas ceased for a long time. One of the possible reasons for the cessation of book publishing in the Udege language is the fact that in 1937 Yevgeny Shneider was repressed.

In subsequent years, representatives of the Udege intelligentsia made attempts to revive writing. Thus, in the 1940s, the writer Dzhansi Kimonko developed his own version of the Udege Cyrillic alphabet (much later it began to be used in book publishing by Saint Petersburg publishing houses without changes), but at that time his initiative did not receive support from the authorities. In the 1960s, a resident of the village of Gvasyugi, Valentina Kyalundzyuga, wrote a number of plays in the Udege language, the manuscripts of which have not survived to this day. It is noted that in the 1980s, even before the official restoration of the Udege script, some Udege used both Cyrillic and Latin to write their language.

In the late 1980s, the issue of restoring the Udege script was raised again. Specialists developed several versions of the Cyrillic alphabet - one in the Leningrad branch of the Institute of Linguistics of the USSR Academy of Sciences (author - Orest Sunik), and the second - in Khabarovsk (author M. D. Simonov). The second option was officially approved by the Khabarovsk Regional Executive Committee in January 1989.

The "Leningrad" version of the Udege alphabet contains the following characters: А а, Б б, В в, Г г, Д д, Е е, Ё ё, Ӡ ӡ, И и, й, К к, Л л, М м, Н н, Ӈ ӈ, О о, П п, Р р, С с, Т т, У у, Ф ф, Х х, Ц ц, Ч ч, Э э, Ю ю, Я я. In addition, an apostrophe is used before vowels, indicating that the vowel is followed by a glottal stop. In this alphabet, in the 2000s - 2010s, a number of educational books and dictionaries were published, mainly by the authorship of Albina Girfanova.

The “Khabarovsk” version of the alphabet, in which most of the literature is currently published, has the following form:

А а	'А 'а	Ā ā	Â â	Б б	В в	Г г	ғ	Д д	Ӡ ӡ	И и	Ӣ ӣ	И̂ и̂
Й й	К к	Л л	М м	Н н	Њ њ	Ӈ ӈ	О о	'О 'о	Ō ō	Ô ô	П п	р
С с	Т т	У у	Ӯ ӯ	У̂ ŷ	ф	Х х	Ч ч	ь	Э э	'э	Э̄ э̄	Э̂ э̂

A feature of this alphabet is the reflection of all 18 vowel phonemes of the Udege language in writing - simple low-intensity (letters without diacritics), abrupt low-intensity (letters with an apostrophe), sharp intense (letters with a circumflex) and smooth intense (letters with a macron). Supporters of the "Leningrad" alphabet criticize the "Khabarovsk" version for the difficulty of perception by students.

The Udege writer Aleksandr Kanchuga in his books published in the mid-2000s uses his own writing system, consisting of letters of the Russian alphabet with the addition of the sign Ң ң.

In addition to the above alphabets, which are currently functioning, in the early 1990s, other versions of the Cyrillic alphabet were used in a number of publications. So, in one of the first Udege books published after the renewal of writing, a manual for teachers of the Udege language of 1991, the following alphabet is used: А а, Б б, В в, Ԝ ԝ, Г г, Д д, Ә ә, Е е, Ё ё, Ж ж, З з, Ӡ ӡ, И и, Й й, К к, Л л, М м, Н н, Ӈ ӈ, Њ њ, О о, П п, Р р, С с, Т т, У у, Ф ф, Х х, Ц ц, Ч ч, Ш ш, Щ щ, Ъ ъ, Ы ы, Ь ь, Э э, Ю ю, Я я. Also in this alphabet, an apostrophe was used for a stop laryngeal sound, an acute for long vowels, and a subletter circle for reduced sounds. In the “Udege illustrated alphabet”, published in the same year, the same author used a slightly different version of the alphabet: А а, Б б, Ԝ ԝ, Г г, Д д, Ә ә, е, ё, Ӡ ӡ, И и, Й й, К к, Л л, М м, Н н, Ӈ ӈ, Њ њ, О о, П п, С с, Т т, У у, ф, Х х, Ч ч, Ц ц, ю, я.

== Comparison chart of Udege alphabets ==
Alphabet correspondence table:

IPA	Latin	«Khabarovsk» Cyrillic	«Leningrad»/«Petersburg» Cyrillic	Kanchuga's Cyrillic	IPA	Latin	«Khabarovsk» Cyrillic	«Leningrad»/«Petersburg» Cyrillic	Kanchuga's Cyrillic
/a/	A a	А а			/o/	O o	О о		
/u/	U u	У у			/ә/	Ә ә	Э э	Ә ә (Э э)	Э э
/i/	I i	И и			/e/	E e	Иэ иэ	Е е (Иэ иэ)	Е е, Иэ иэ
/æ/	Æ æ	Иа иа	Я я		/ө/	Ө ө	Ио ио	Ё ё	
/y(i)/	Y(i) y(i)	Ио(и) ио(и)	Ю(й) ю(й)		/aa/	Ā ā	Ā ā, Á á	Á á	Аа аа
/oo/	Ō ō	Ō ō	Ó ó	Оо оо	/uu/	Ū ū	Ӯ ӯ	У́ у́	Уу уу
/əə/	Ə̄ ə̄	Э̄ э̄	Ә́ ә́	Ээ ээ	/ii/	Ī ī	Ӣ ӣ	И́ и́	Ии ии
/ee/	Iə iə	Иэ иэ	Иә́ иә́ (Иэ́ иэ́)	Е е	/ææ/	Eæ eæ	Иа иа	Я́ я́	Иа иа
/өө/	Yɵ yɵ	Ӧ̄ ӧ̄	Ё́ ё	Ё ё	/yy/	Yi yi	Ӱ̄ ӱ̄	Ю́ ю́	Ю ю
/‘ā/	‘A ‘a	‘А ‘а		А а, Аа аа	/‘ō/	‘O ‘o	‘О ‘о		О о, Оо оо
/‘ə̄/	‘Ə ‘ə	‘Э ‘э	‘Ә ‘ә (‘Э ‘э)	Э э, Ээ ээ	/āh/	Aha aha	Â â	-	-
/ōh/	Oho oho	О̂ о̂	-	-	/ūh/	Uhu uhu	У̂ ŷ	-	-
/ə̄h/	Əhə əhə	Э̂ э̂	-	-	/īh/	Ihi ihi	И̂ и̂	-	-
/ai/	Ai ai, Aj aj	Аи аи	Ай ай (Аи аи)	Аи аи, Ай ай	/p/	P p	П п		
/b/	B в	Б б			/t/	T t	Т т		
/d/	D d	Д д			/c/	C c	Ч ч		
/č/	C c	Ц ц			/ʒ/	Ʒ ʒ	Ӡ ӡ		З з; Д д + и, я, е, ю, ё
/k/	K k	К к			/g/	G g	Г г		
/γ/	G g	Ғ ғ	-	-	/f/	F f	Ф ф		
/s/	S s	С с			/x/	X x	Х х		
/m/	M m	М м			/n/	N n	Н н		
/ɲ/	Ņ ņ	Њ њ		Н н + и, я, е, ю, ё	/ŋ/	Ŋ ŋ	Ӈ ӈ		Ң ң
/w/	W w	В в	Ԝ ԝ	В в, У у	/j/	J j	Й й		Й й; я, е, ю, ё
/l/	L l	Л л			/r/	R r	Р р		
/z/	Z z	З з							
