= Komi peoples =

Permian ethnic group

Komi
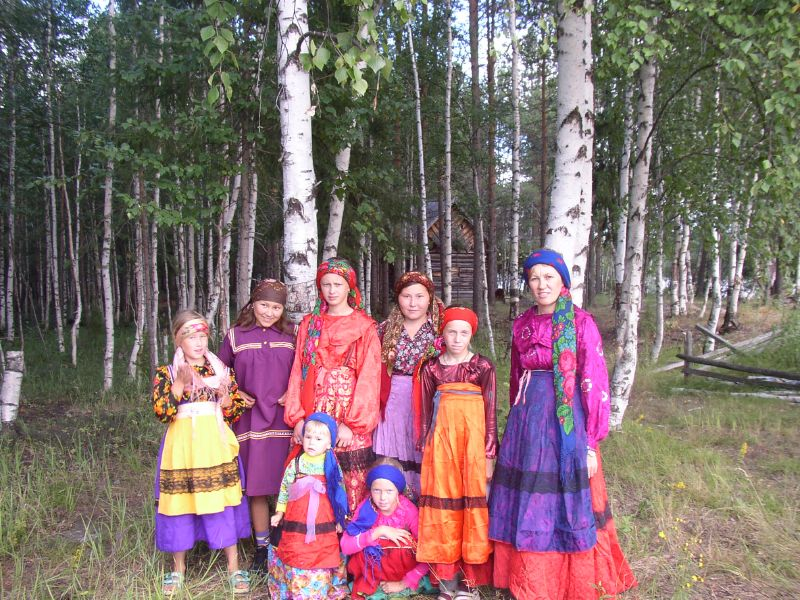
- A group of Komi women and children photographed in 2006 in the Khanty-Mansi Autonomous Okrug

Total population
- approx. 553,000 (2002)

Regions with significant populations
- Russia, largely located in the Komi Republic, Perm Krai, Nenets Autonomous Okrug, Khanty-Mansi Autonomous Okrug, and Murmansk Oblast
- Russia: Komi-Zyryans 293,406 (2002), 228,235 (2010); Komi-Permyaks 125,235 (2002), 94,456 (2010)
- Ukraine: Komi-Zyryans and Komi-Permyaks 2,710 (2001)
- CIS: Komi-Zyryans 8,210 (1989); Komi-Permyaks 4,791 (1989)
- Estonia: Komi-Zyryans and Komi-Permyaks 95 (2011)
- Finland: Komi speakers 29 (2017)

Languages
- Russian, Komi (Zyryan, Permyak, Yazva)

Religion
- Predominantly Eastern Orthodox Christianity; (Russian Orthodox Church, Old Believers); also Shamanism

Related ethnic groups
- Udmurts, other Permians

The Komi (Komi: комияс, romanized: komijas also коми-войтыр, komi-vojtyr) are a Permian ethnic group who are indigenous to, and primarily inhabit a region around the basins of the Vychegda, Pechora and Kama rivers in northeastern European Russia. They mostly reside in the Komi Republic, Perm Krai, Murmansk Oblast, Khanty–Mansi Autonomous Okrug, and Nenets Autonomous Okrug in the Russian Federation.

== Name ==
There have been at least three names for the Komi: Permyaks (Russian: пермяки), Zyrians (зыряне), and Komi (коми).

The name Permyaks first appeared in Russian sources in the 10th century and came from the ancient name of the land between the Mezen and Pechora rivers – Perm or Great Perm (Russian: Пермь Великая). Several origins of the name have been proposed, but the most accepted is from Veps Peräma 'back, outer or far-away land.' In Old Norse and Old English, it was known as Bjarmaland and Beormas respectively, but those Germanic names designate a wider area than the Russian Perm, extending into Arkhangelsk Oblast.

Since the 20th century, the name has been applied only to the southern Komi (Komi-Permyaks) in Perm Krai. In Russia, permyak also means "an inhabitant of Perm or Perm Krai", regardless of ethnicity.

The name for the northern Komis – Zyryans – has a more contradictory origin. It exists since at least the 14th century and has many different forms in various Russian sources such as Seryan (серьяне), Siryan (сирьяне), Syryan (сыряне), and Suryan (суряне), as well as Ziryan (зиряне), Ziranian, and Zyryan (зыряне), but the latter finally became predominant. Turkin believed that it may come from a small tribe of the Komi (probably named saran) which was first met by the Russians, who used the name for all northern Komi. The neighbouring Uralic-speaking peoples use similar names for the Komi: Khanty sərän, sərån, săran, sārån, Mansi sarän, Nenets sānnğr, saran, and Udmurt sara-kum.

The name Komi is the endonym for all subgroups of the people. It was first recorded by ethnographers in the 18th century. It originates from a Finno-Ugric word meaning 'man, human': Komi kom, Udmurt kum, Mansi kom, kum, Khanty xum, Selkup qum, and Hungarian hím 'male.' The theory that stated the word came from the name of the Kama River has been disproven, though some scholars like Paula Kokkonen favour this version.

== Subgroups and geographic distribution ==
Komi-Zyryans Komi of the Izhma River Komi-Permyaks Komi of the Yazva River Komi of the Upper Kama River (Zyuzdino or Afanasyevo), nearly fully assimilated

The Komi are divided into two main groups, which are the Zyryans (northern Komi) and the Permyaks (southern Komi). These are divided into 8 subgroupings (9 if counting the almost completely russified Komi of the Upper Kama), which are further divided into even smaller subgroups. The Komi have been traditionally named after the rivers where they live:

- Komi-Zyryans
  - Komi-Izhma of the Izhma River (Komi: Изьватас, Iźvatas; Nenets: нысма, nysma)
    - Komi of the Kola Peninsula
    - Komi of the Nenets Autonomous Okrug
    - Komi of the Lower Ob and Lyapin Rivers
  - Komi of the Vashka and Mezen Rivers (Komi: Удораса, Udorasa)
  - Komi of the Vym River (Komi: Емватас, Emvatas)
  - Komi of the Pechora River (Komi: Печораса, Pećorasa)
  - Komi of the Vychegda River (Komi: Эжватас, Ežvatas)
  - Komi of the Sysola River (Komi: Сыктывсаяс, Syktyvsayas)
  - Komi of the Letka and Luza Rivers (Komi: Лузса, Lusza)
- Komi-Permyaks
  - Komi of the Yazva River (Komi: Ёдзва, Yodzva'; Yazva: Пермякйӧз, Permyakyöz)
  - Komi of the Upper Kama River (nearly fully assimilated into Russians)

The majority of the Komi live in the Komi Republic as a separate national-administrative entity of the Russian Federation, numbering 256,000 as of the beginning of the 21st century, roughly 30% of the Republic's population. About 60% (607,000) are Russians, about 6% (62,000) are Ukrainians, 1.5% (15,500) are Tatars, and 1.4% (15,000) are Belarusians.

Most of the population of the Komi Republic resides in urban centres but a notable minority continues to live in villages. The Komi population in the countryside tends to be higher than that of Komi in urban areas, where ethnic Russians make up the majority of the population. Like the rest of the Finno-Ugric peoples of Russia, the population continues to steadily decrease - the 2010 census recorded only 228,235 people who indicated their nationality as "Komi", as compared to the 336,309 recorded as Komi in the 1989 census.

== Language ==
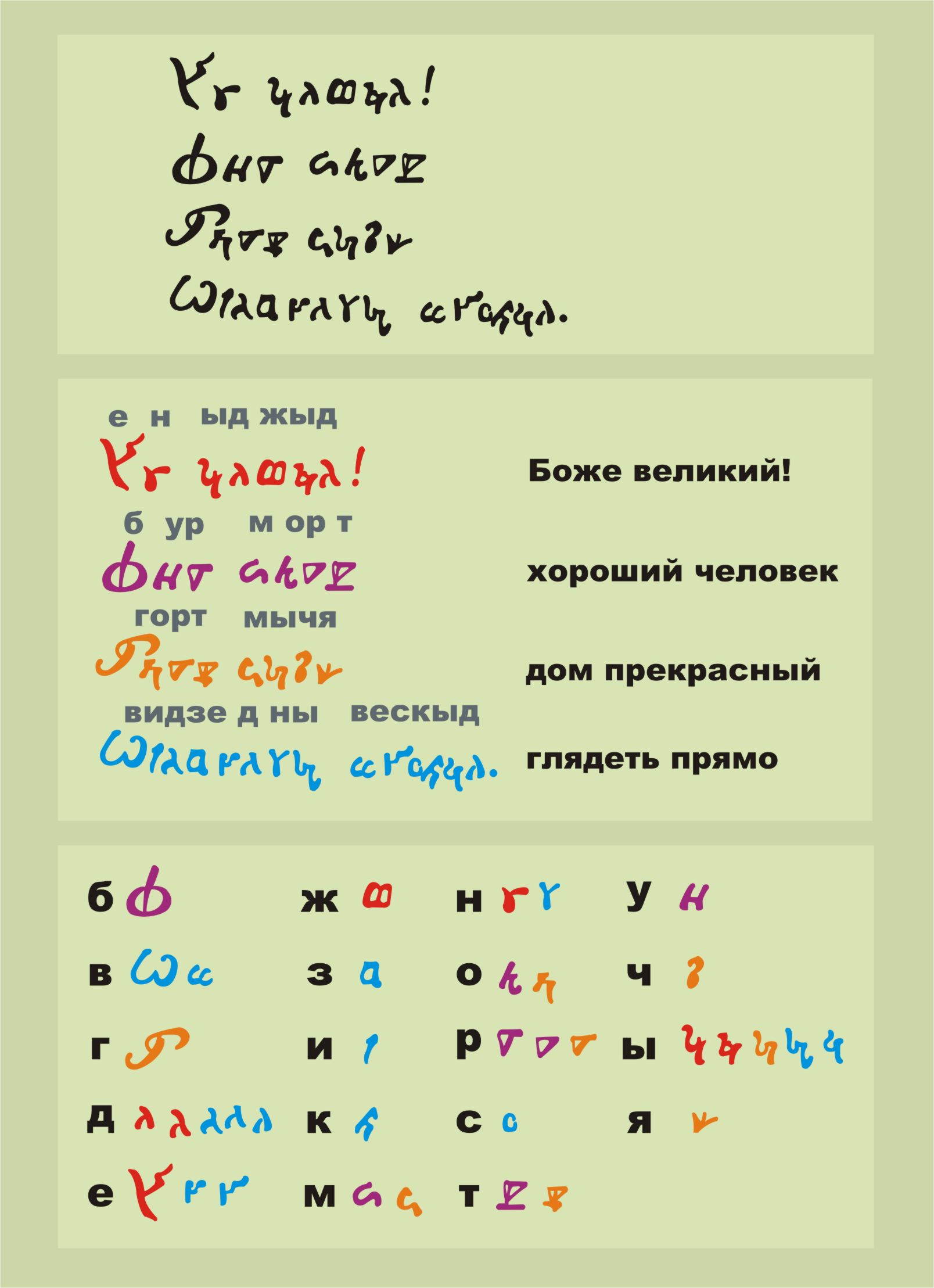
Writings in the Old Permian (Anbur) script.

The Komi language belongs to the Permian branch of the Uralic family. There is limited mutual intelligibility with Udmurt. There are two main dialects: Zyrian in the Komi Republic and Permyak in the Komi-Permyak Okrug, which have been traditionally treated as separate languages. They are mutually intelligible, and can also be considered to form a single language with two regional language standards. The two separate standards were created in the early Soviet era partly because of the traditional administrative borders, and partly to hinder pan-Komi nationalistic aspirations. Until the 18th century, Komi was written in the Old Permic script (Komi: Важ Перым гижӧм, 𐍮𐍐𐍕 𐍟𐍔𐍠𐍨𐍜 𐍒𐍣𐍕𐍩𐍜, Važ Perym gižöm), also known as Anbur in reference in reference to its first 2 letters, which was created by Saint Stephen of Perm in the 14th century, seeing use up to the 16th century after which it saw use as a cryptographic writing system for Russian speakers.

Cyrillic was used from the 19th century and briefly replaced by the Latin alphabet between 1932 and 1936. The Komi language is currently written in Cyrillic, adding two extra letters - Іі and Ӧӧ - to represent vowel sounds which do not exist in Russian. The first book to be printed in Komi (a vaccination manual) appeared in 1815.

== History ==
Based on linguistic reconstruction, the prehistoric Permians are assumed to have split into two peoples during the first millennium BC: the Komi and the Udmurts. By the 16th–17th centuries, the Komi further divided into the Komi-Permyaks (who remained in the Kama River basin) and the Komi-Zyryans (who migrated north).

From the 12th century, the Russians began to expand into the Perm region and the Komi came into contact with Novgorod. Novgorodian traders travelled to the region in search of furs and animal hides. The Novgorodians referred to the southern Komi region as "the Great Perm". Komi dukes unified the Great Perm with its centre at the stronghold of Cherdyn. As the Middle Ages progressed, Novgorod gave way to Moscow as the leading Russian power in the region. Although Novgorod claimed the territory, it had little control and formally gave up its rights in 1471.

In 1365, Dmitry Donskoy, the prince of Moscow, gave Stephen of Perm the task of converting the region to Christianity. Stephen's mission led to the creation of the eparchy of Perm in 1383. After his death, Stephen became the patron saint of the Komi. He also devised an alphabet for the Komi language. Despite this, Great Perm remained unconverted for another century. The Komi-Permyaks later took part in Moscow-led campaigns against Yugra and the Mansi. At the same time, Great Perm was subject to attacks by the Mansi, Ostyaks and Siberian Tatars.

Some Komi resisted Christianisation, notably the shaman Pama. The first attempt at Christianising the Komi-Permyaks in 1455 was unsuccessful. The duke of Perm accepted baptism only in 1470 (he was given the Christian name Mikhail), possibly in an attempt to stave off Russian military pressure in the region. Mikhail's conversion failed to stop an attack by Moscow which seized Cherdyn in 1472. Mikhail was allowed to keep his title of duke but was now a vassal of Moscow. The duchy survived only until 1505, when Mikhail's son Matvei was replaced by a Russian governor and Komi independence came to an end.

In the 1500s, many Russian migrants began to move into the region, beginning a long process of colonisation and attempts at assimilating the Komis. Syktyvkar (Ust-Sysolsk before 1930) was founded as the chief Russian city in the region in the 18th century. The Russian government established penal settlements in the north for criminals and political prisoners. There were several Komi rebellions in protest against Russian rule and the influx of Slav settlers, especially after large numbers of freed serfs started arriving in the region in the 1860s. A national movement to revive Komi culture also emerged.

After the Allies withdrew from the Russian Civil War in 1919, the Bolsheviks took over. They promoted Komi culture with the policy of korenizatsiya, but increased industrialisation damaged the Komi traditional way of life and the landscape of the republic. Stalin's purges of the 1930s devastated the Komi intelligentsia, who were accused of "bourgeois nationalism".

The remote and inhospitable region was also regarded as an ideal location for gulags. The influx of political prisoners and the rapid industrialisation of the region as a result of World War II left the Komi a minority in their own lands. Stalin carried out further purges of the Komi intellectual class in the 1940s and 1950s, and Komi language and culture were suppressed. Since the end of the Soviet Union in 1991, the Komi have reasserted their claims to a separate identity.

== Culture ==
=== Architecture ===
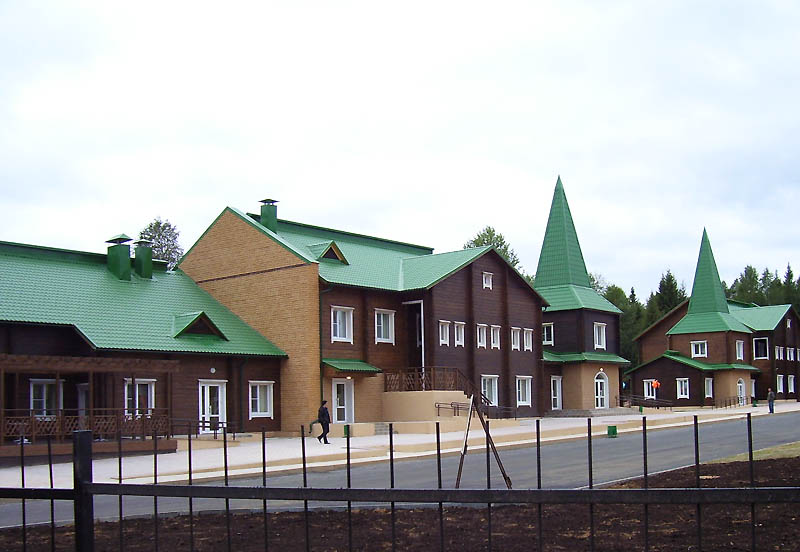
A Finno-Ugric Ethnopark, Yb, Syktyvdinsky District

The Komi settlements were set up with large, multi-courtyard churchyards and villages, which were typically constructed along or close to a river. Since the Komi people inhabit territories densely covered with forests, the main material for the construction of houses and farm buildings has traditionally been wood. Komi dwellings in many respects resemble North Russian houses in their internal structure.

2 major types of house types exist among the Komi, the Sysol house type (Сысольский тип) and the Vym house type (Bымский тип). The Sysol home is in a square-shaped, divided internally between a commercial section and the private section for its residents. The Vym house type is not very easy to distinguish from the Sysol home, its major differences lying in the windows and internal arrangement. The Izhma Komi, living in sparsely-wooded areas live in chum tents.

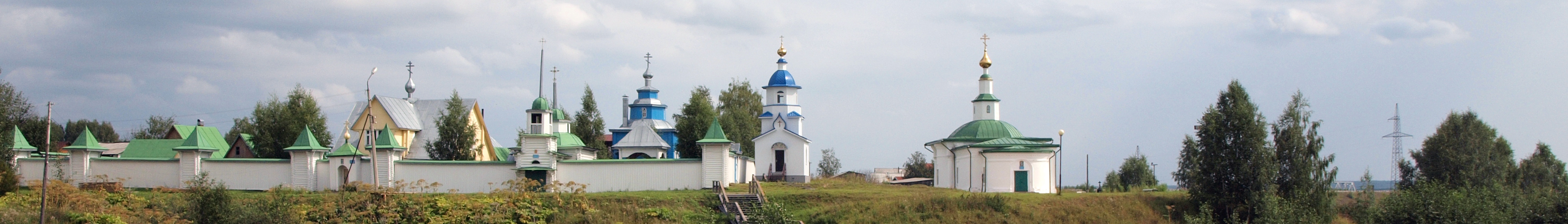
Monastery with churches dedicated to Michael the Archangel and Stephen of Perm, Ust Vym.

The efforts of Stephen of Perm to convert the Komi people to Orthodoxy had allowed the Komi to begin constructing and experimenting with church architecture, creating many churches with the tented-roof style similarly to the constructions happening in Northern Russia and Pomorye. While most churches in the territory of the republic were constructed with wood, select churches and monasteries featured stone construction. The republic had over 430 churches in 1917, but this number has fallen down to just 130, 31 of which are registered under heritage programs.

=== Clothing ===
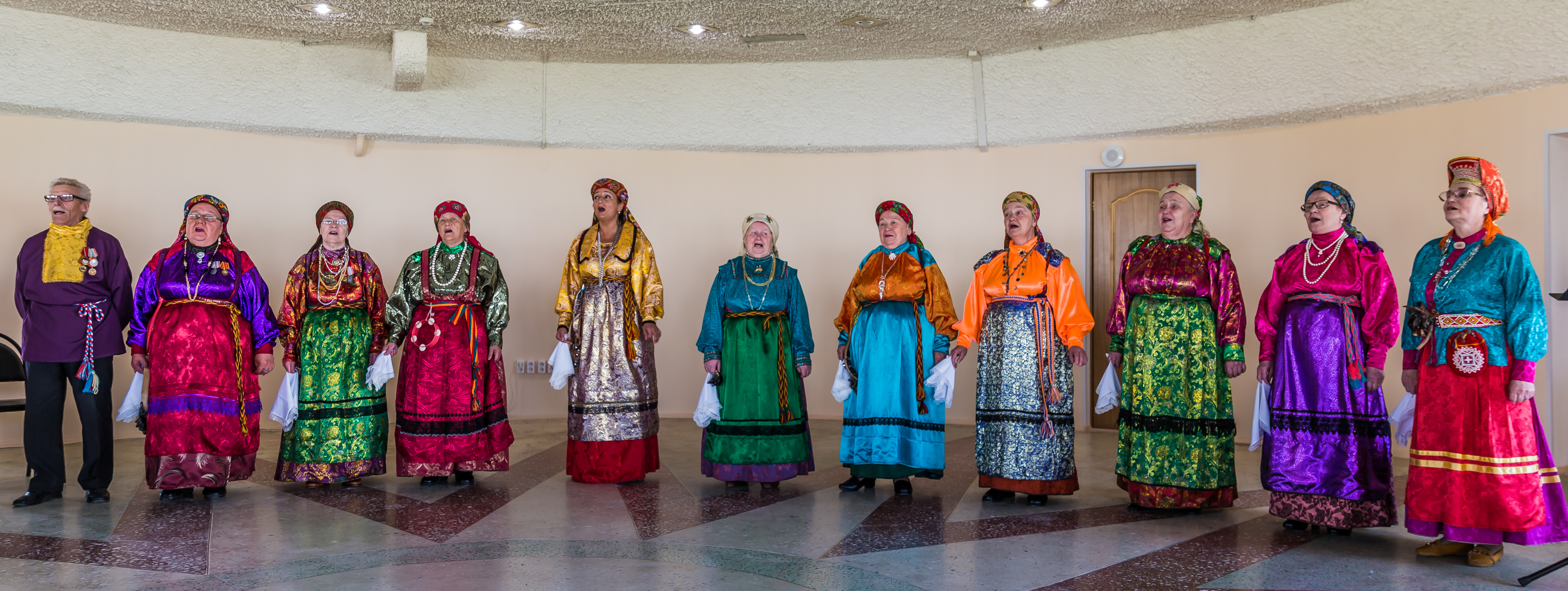
A Izhma komi and Kildin Sámi choir in Lovozero, Murmansk Oblast.

The national dress of the Komi people is quite diverse and has numerous local variants. While men's clothing had remained mostly similar throughout the territories inhabited by the Komi people (excluding the winter costumes of Komi males), women's clothing has more variety, each region having its own distinct clothing type. These differences lie in the embroidery technique, type of fabrics and ornamentation. In general, the traditional clothing of the southern and central Komi closely resembles that of the Northern Russians and other Finno-Ugric groups, while the costume of the Izhma Komi has many common features with the Nenets.

=== Cuisine ===
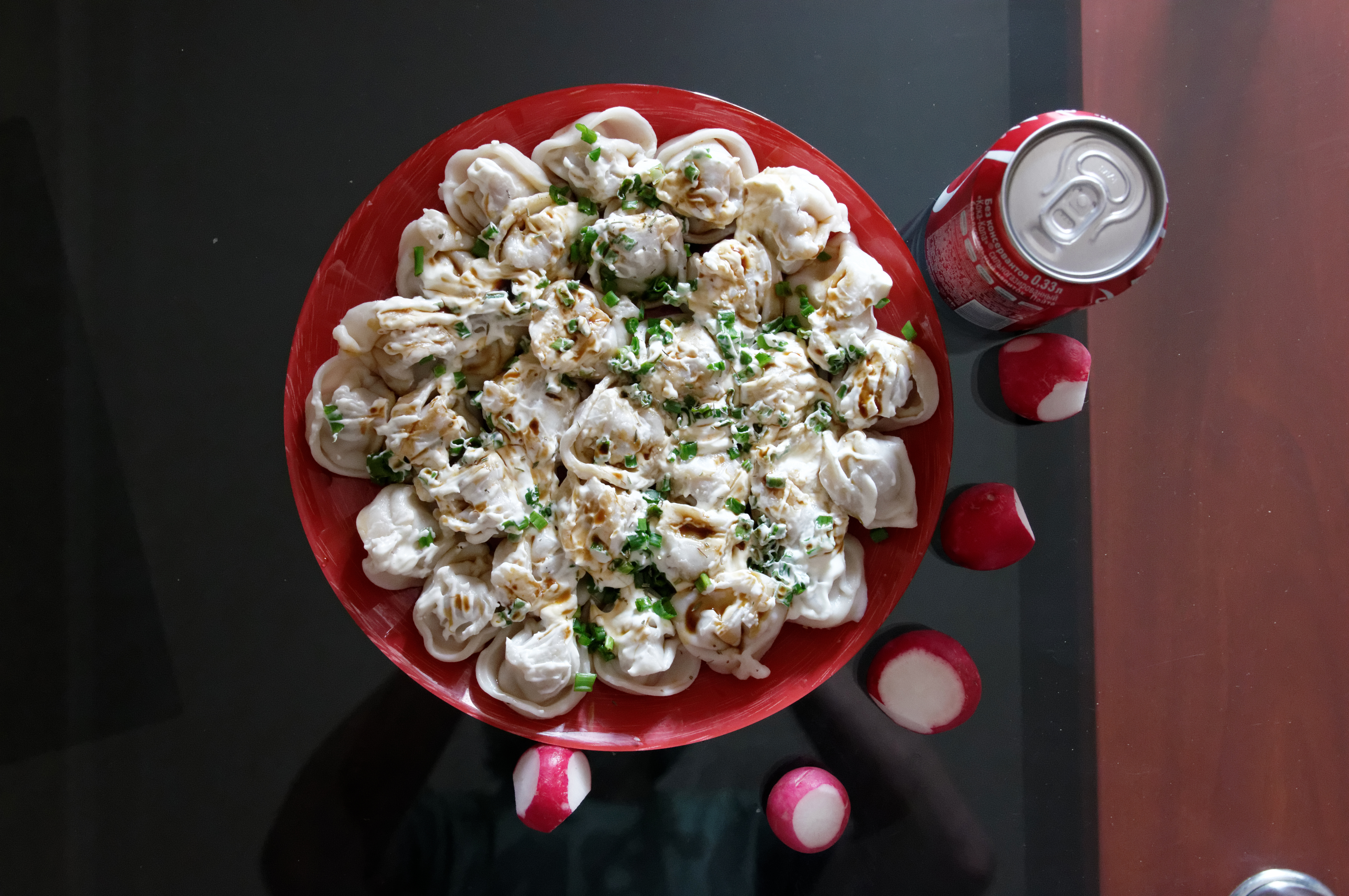
The dish pelmeni likely has its origins amongst the Permian Komi and Udmurt people.

Hunting, gathering and fishing have long been the main source of food for the Komi people, displayed through the dominance of meat, fish, berries and mushrooms in most Komi diets. Meat dishes were more common in the diet of the northern Komi, while dishes utilizing berries were more common in the south. Popular dishes of Komi cuisine are grain pies with fish, various porridges, Serbanka, other sour soups, cold soups based on bread, kvass, etc. The popular Russian dumpling dish pelmeni likely has its origins in the cuisine of the Komi and Udmurt peoples, its name (пельнянь, pel'n'an') meaning "ear bread" in both languages.

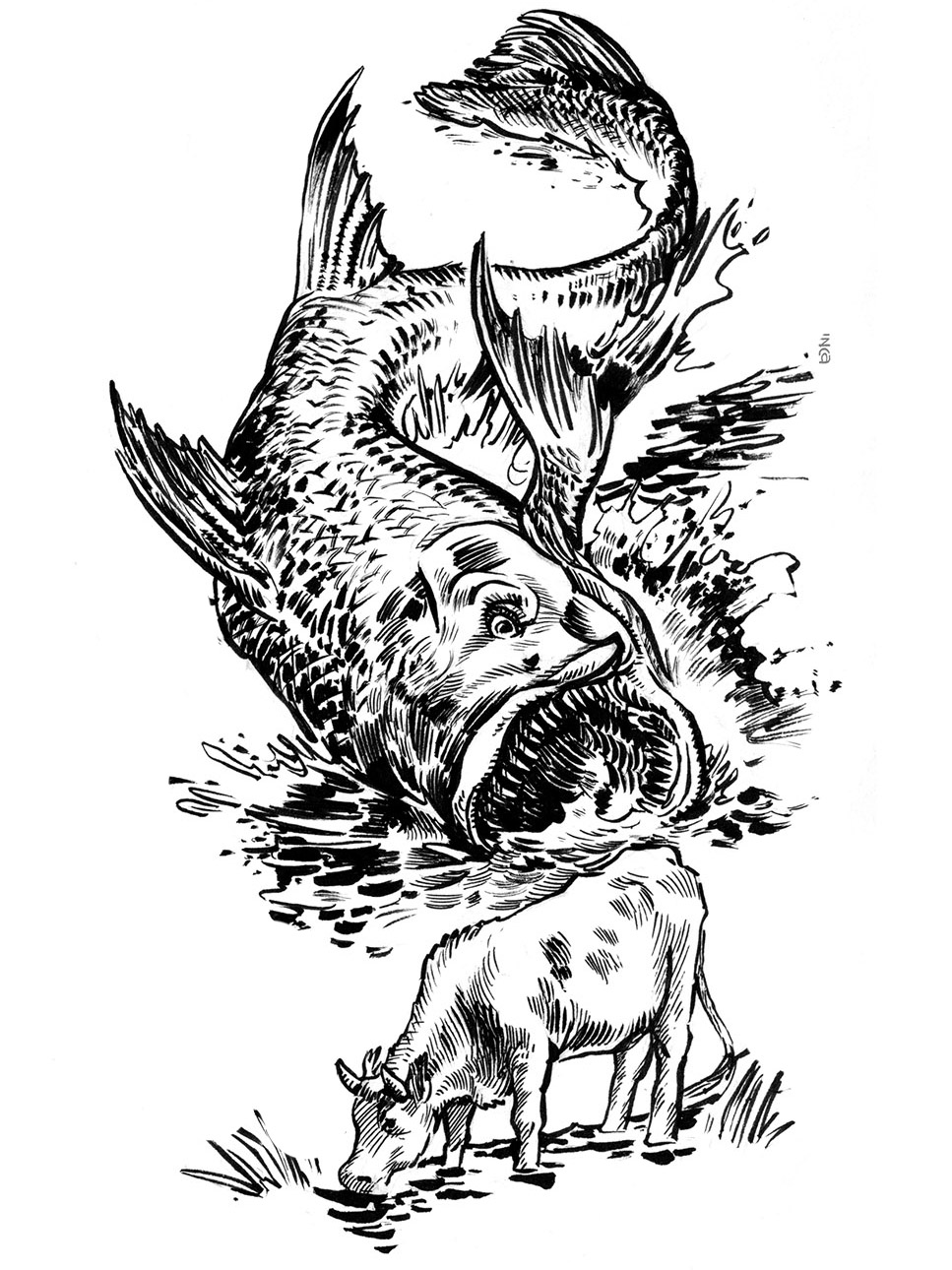
Contemporary depiction of a folktale collected from the Komi of Udorsky District.

=== Folklore and religion ===
Most Komi myths are related to shamanism and paganism. The most widespread myths are about the creation of the world as a result of the struggle of two gods, En (Komi: Ен) and Omöl' (Komi: Омöль). These 2 deities are regarded as creator-gods in the Komi mythos, who created all life in the world (though it was En who would vivify them). As the Komi were gradually Christianized, the depictions of En & Omöl began to mirror those of God and Satan, in which Omöl would be depicted as the latter due to his efforts to hamper En's creation process.

Even with the Christianization of the Komi, there are relatively few Christian legends and tales in the folklore of the Komi, but tales of chudins, who are pagans and flee away from the new order to the forests, have become widespread. Some notable characters from Komi mythology include Jirkap (Йиркап) from Sindor, who is thought by the Komi to have invented skis, Joma (Ёма) who is regarded to be a Komi equivalent to the Baba Yaga and Pera (Пера) who is a character from the tales of the Komi-Permyaks known for his courage.

Information regarding the pre-Christian Komi religion is not well researched, with formal research by Russian ethnologists only beginning during the later half of the 19th century. Klavdij Alekseevich Popov (1874), Alexandr Vasilevich Krasov (1896), and Kallistrat Faloleevich Zhakov (1901) all made attempts to reconstruct the ancient religion of the Komi-Zyryans. Nikolai Abramovich Rogov (1858, 1860), Nikolai Dobrotvorsky (1883), Ivan Nikolaevich Smirnov (1891), and Vladimir Mikhailovich Yanovich (1903) made reconstructions of the aspects of the Komi religion focusing on the natural world. According to The Life of Saint Stefan, the Bishop of Perm (1897) by Epiphany the Wise, the Komi ancestors had many deities, whose wooden images stood in dedicated cult sanctuaries for higher-ranking deities, while those of domestic deities were kept in Komi dwellings.

== Genetics ==
=== Uniparental lineages ===
In Tambets et al, 2018, more than half of Komi-Zyryan men have haplogroup N, which is typical for the Uralic-speaking peoples. 37% carry its subclade N1c and 18.5 percent belong to subgroup N-P43. The second most common Y-haplogroup for Komi is R1a (27.4%). Other studies found that the y-DNA of the Komi was found to be 33% and 35% N clades respectively, with R1a being represented at 33% R1b at 16% percent in the latter study.

Among the mtDNA haplogroups, the most common is H (33%). About one in four have the haplogroup U. 13.6% belong to its subgroup U4 and 9.9% belong to subgroup U5. Haplogroup T is found with a frequency of 13.3%. A study found that Komi-Permyaks had high levels of East Eurasian origin mtDNA, at 33.8%.

=== Autosomal DNA ===
A study on northeastern European populations, published in March 2013, found that Komi-Zyryans form a distinct pole of genetic diversity.

According to a 2018 study, approximately 19% of Komi autosomal ancestry can be estimated to be Nganasan-like. This Siberian-related component is typical for Uralic populations.

== Notable people ==
- Pitirim Sorokin, Russian-American sociologist
- Peter Sorokin, Russian-American physicist
- Konstantin Zyryanov, Russian football manager and a former player
- Katya Shchekina, Russian model

== See also ==
- Sami people
- Indigenous peoples

== Sources ==
- Avril, Yves (2006). Parlons komi. Harmattan.
- Chagin, G. N. (2014). "Пермская земля". In Kravets, S. L. (ed.). Большая российская энциклопедия. Том 25: П — Пертурбационная функция (in Russian). Большая российская энциклопедия. pp. 706–707. ISBN 978-5-85270-362-0. Archived from the original on 4 November 2025.
- Minahan, James (2002a). "Komi". Encyclopedia of the Stateless Nations. Vol. II (D–K). Greenwood. pp. 1003–1008. ISBN 978-0-313-32110-8.
- Minahan, James (2002b). "Permyaks". Encyclopedia of the Stateless Nations. Vol. III (L–R). Greenwood. pp. 1505–1509. ISBN 978-0-313-32111-5.
- Taagepera, Rein (1999). The Finno-Ugric Republics and the Russian State. C. Hurst & Co.
- Туркин, А. И. (1995). "Происхождение названий коми народа" [Turkin, Adolf. The origin of the names for Komi people]. Linguistica Uralica (in Russian). XXXI (1): 17–28. doi:10.3176/lu.1995.1.03. ISSN 0868-4731.
