= Great Perm =

Historical region in Russia

Great Perm Ыджыт Перем (Komi-Permyak) Пермь Великая (Russian)
- 1324–1708
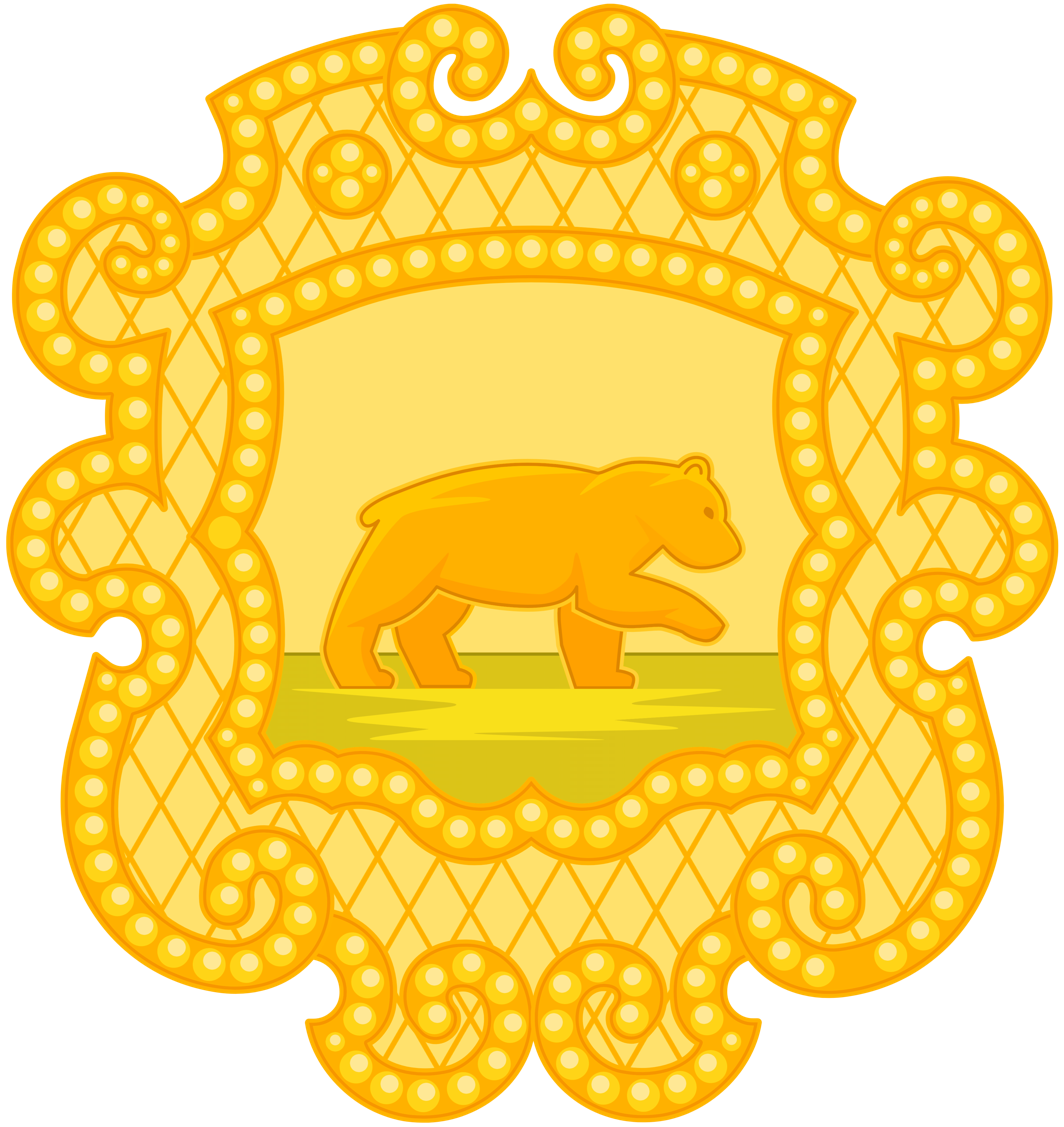
- Coat of arms

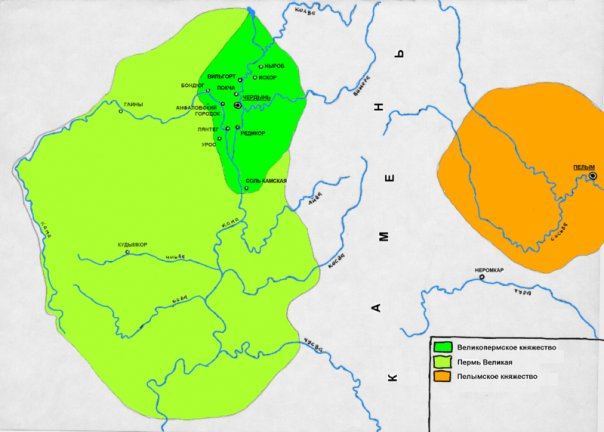
- Capital: Cherdyn (1324–1472, 1535–1613); Pokcha (1472–1535); Solikamsk (1636–1708)
- History
  - Established: 1324
  - Disestablished: 1708
Succeeded by
Siberia Governorate
- Today part of: Russia

Great Perm (Note: Komi-Permyak: Ыджыт Перем, romanized: Ydžyt Perem; Russian: Пермь Великая, romanized: Perm Velikaya.) or Perm Land, (Note: Russian: Пермская земля, romanized: Permskaya zemlya.) also known as the Principality of Perm (1451–1505), (Note: Russian: Пермское княжество, romanized: Permskoye knyazhestvo; Komi-Permyak: Ыджыт Перем öксуму, romanized: Ydžyt Perem Öksumu; also known as the Principality of Great Perm; Russian: Великопермское княжество.) is a historical region and former principality along the Kama River in Russia. The city of Cherdyn was the center of the region.

The region is first mentioned in 1324. Vasily II of Moscow appointed a prince in 1451 to govern the region. Great Perm was formally dependent on Novgorod until 1471, after which it was dependent on Moscow until it was incorporated into the Russian state in 1505.

The use of the official name Great Perm ceased in 1708 when the Siberia Governorate was established as part of administrative reforms by Peter the Great. The Perm Governorate was established in 1796, which in turn was succeeded by Perm Krai, later a federal subject of Russia.

== Etymology ==
The origin of the name Perm is uncertain. The most common explanation derives the name Perm from parma ("forested highlands" in the Komi language). While the city of Perm is a modern foundation named for Permia, the town of Cherdyn was reportedly itself known as the capital of "Great Perm" in the past. Cherdyn acted as a central market town, and it is sometimes suggested that perm was simply a term for "merchants" or "market" in a local language, but there have been other suggestions.

According to Russian linguist Dmitry Bubrikh, the name was loaned into Russian from Finnic perämaa ("hinterland"). The same name is likely reflected in the toponym Bjarmaland in Norse sagas. The general region of Great Perm was known as wisu (ويسو) in medieval Arab ethnography, so referred to in the works of Ahmad ibn Fadlan, al-Gharnati, Zakariya al-Qazwini and Yaqut al-Hamawi (in his Dictionary of Countries). The term is perhaps derived from the name of the Vepsians (Ves) who settled around Lake Ladoga and the upper Sukhona River.

== History ==
=== Early history ===
The region of Perm is first mentioned in 1187, which at first referred to the Vychegda basin and what later came to be known as Old Perm or Little Perm. The Komi territories "along the Kama River" in the south were first mentioned under the year 1324 in the chronicle of Novgorod when describing the last trip of Yury of Moscow to the Golden Horde. Great Perm came to consist of the upper Kama, from the Pechora River and Lake Chusovskoye in the north, the confluence of the Chusovaya River and the Kama River in the south, the source of the Kama in the west, and the Ural Mountains in the east.

Salt production on the Usolka River began in 1430 and the Russian settlement of Sol-Kamskaya (now Solikamsk) was established the same year. Although Novgorod claimed the territory, it had little control and formally gave up its rights in 1471, before it was ultimately annexed by Moscow in 1478.

=== Principality ===
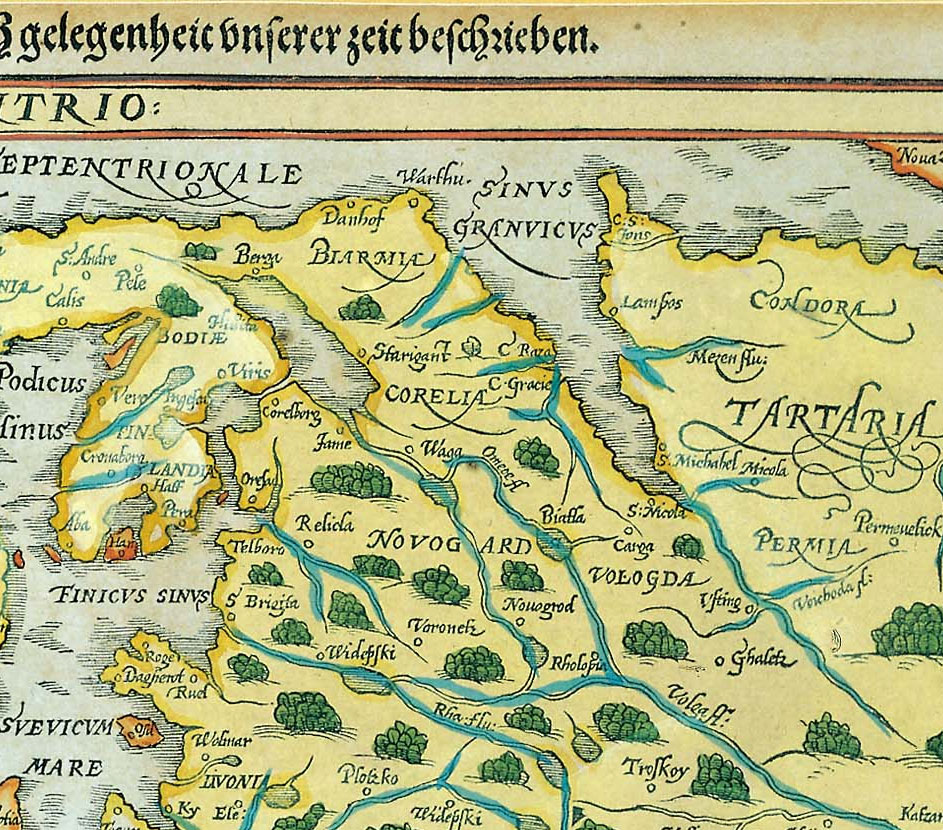
Map of Northern Russia, including Permia; by Gerard Mercator (Amsterdam, 1595).

Vasily II of Moscow appointed Mikhail Yermolayevich as the prince of Great Perm in 1451. Mikhail's father, Yermolay, and his brother, Vasily, were sent to govern Vychegda Perm. According to the Vychegda-Vym Chronicle: "Grand Prince Vasily Vasilyevich sent to the Perm land a viceroy from the line of the Vereyan princes, Yermolai, and after him Yermolai and his son Vasily, to rule the Perm land of Vychegda, and sent the eldest son of Yermolai, Mikhail Yermolich, to Great Perm to Cherdyn". Mikhail recognized the suzerainty of the grand prince of Moscow, but refused to participate in the Russo-Kazan War of 1467–1469 during the reign of Ivan III. Instead, in 1467, he launched a campaign against the Mansi (Voguls), together with Vyatka.

Although the Russian missionary Stephen of Perm in the late 14th century was unusually successful in converting the Komi, as he was able to establish his residence at Ust-Vym and become the first bishop in the Vychegda basin, Great Perm remained unconverted for another century. The first attempt at Christianizing the Komi-Permyaks in 1455 ended in failure, as the Russian bishop of Perm, Pitirim, was killed by the Mansi during a raid. From 1462, the efforts of the new bishop, Jonah, led to new churches and monasteries being built, such as the Monastery of Saint John the Theologian in Cherdyn. Russian influence grew as Moscow massed up forces to attack the Mansi and Russian colonists began to settle on the upper Kama.

In 1472, Ivan III dispatched Fyodor Paletsky for a campaign against Great Perm, and his forces from Veliky Ustyug defeated the Komi-Permyak forces. Fyodor Paletsky founded the settlement of Pokcha, which became a stronghold for Moscow. Prince Mikhail and other members of the nobility were captured and taken to Moscow, before being sent back. Prince Mikhail was allowed to continue to rule as a servant of the grand prince. During a raid by the Mansi prince Asyka in 1481, Mikhail died and was succeeded by his son Matvey. The Komi-Permyaks later took part in Moscow-led campaigns against Yugra and the Mansi. At the same time, Great Perm was subject to attacks by the Mansi, Ostyaks and Siberian Tatars.

Great Perm was finally incorporated into the Russian state in 1505 when Ivan III appointed a Russian prince, Vasily Kovrov, as the governor. The next grand prince, Vasily III, issued the Great Perm Charter the same year which set the powers of the governor. Ivan IV would later expand this charter in 1553. He also issued a charter in 1558 giving large landholdings to the Stroganov family. By the early 16th century, Russians had replaced the Komi elite in local administration. Russian peasants also heavily colonized Komi lands around 1500, leading to the assimilation of the Komi, while other Komi were forced to move further north, which in turn led to some of the Mansi being displaced.

=== Later history ===
Up to the early 18th century, the name Great Perm was officially used of the Upper Kama area, a southern part of which was governed by the Stroganov family.

The name was borrowed (as the 'Permian' period) by the nineteenth century geologist Sir Roderick Murchison to refer to rocks of a certain age, following extensive studies which he conducted in the region.

== See also ==
- Bjarmaland
- Permians
- Chud

== Sources ==
- Chagin, G. N. (2014). "Пермская земля". In Kravets, S. L. (ed.). Большая российская энциклопедия. Том 25: П — Пертурбационная функция (in Russian). Большая российская энциклопедия. pp. 706–707. ISBN 978-5-85270-362-0. Archived from the original on 4 November 2025.
- Taagepera, Rein (1999). The Finno-Ugric Republics and the Russian State. Routledge. ISBN 9780415919777.
- V. Oborin. The Settlement and Developing of Ural in Late Eleventh – Early Seventeenth Centuries. University of Irkutsk, 1990.
