= Stephen of Perm =

Russian painter, missionary, and saint (1340–1396)

Saint Stephen of Perm
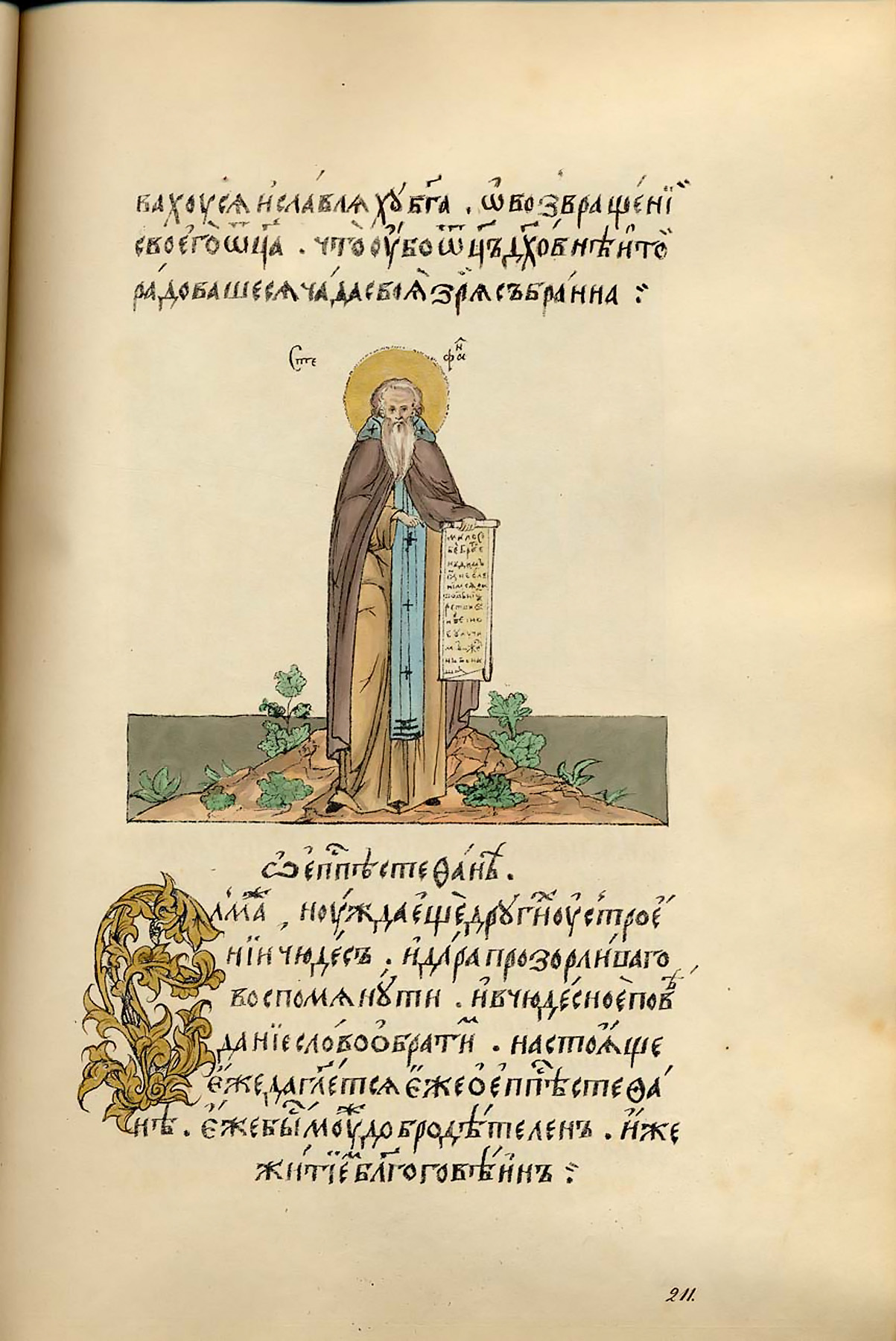
- An illustration of Stephen of Perm from a 16th-century manuscript

The Enlightener of Perm Bishop of Perm
- Born: c. 1340; Ustyug
- Died: 26 April 1396; Moscow
- Venerated in: Eastern Orthodox Church; Roman Catholic Church
- Canonized: 1549 by Russian Orthodox Church
- Feast: 26 April

Stephen of Perm (Russian: Стефан Пермский, romanized: Stefan Permsky; Komi: Перымса Степан, romanized: Perymsa Stepan; c. 1340 – 26 April 1396) was a Russian Orthodox bishop, painter and missionary. He was an important figure of medieval Russia.

Stephen is credited with the conversion of the Komi peoples to Christianity. He settled in Ust-Vym, the center of Vychegda Perm, and was consecrated as the first bishop of Perm in 1383. Instead of using Russian, Stephen preached in the Komi language; he was so successful that the majority of the Komi were baptized into the Russian Orthodox faith.

Stephen also created the Old Permic script; he is considered the founding father of Permian written tradition. "The Enlightener of Perm" or the "Apostle of the Permians", as he is sometimes called, is commemorated by the Catholic and Eastern Orthodox Churches on 26 April. Epiphanius the Wise wrote about his life in The Life of Stephen of Perm.

== Life ==
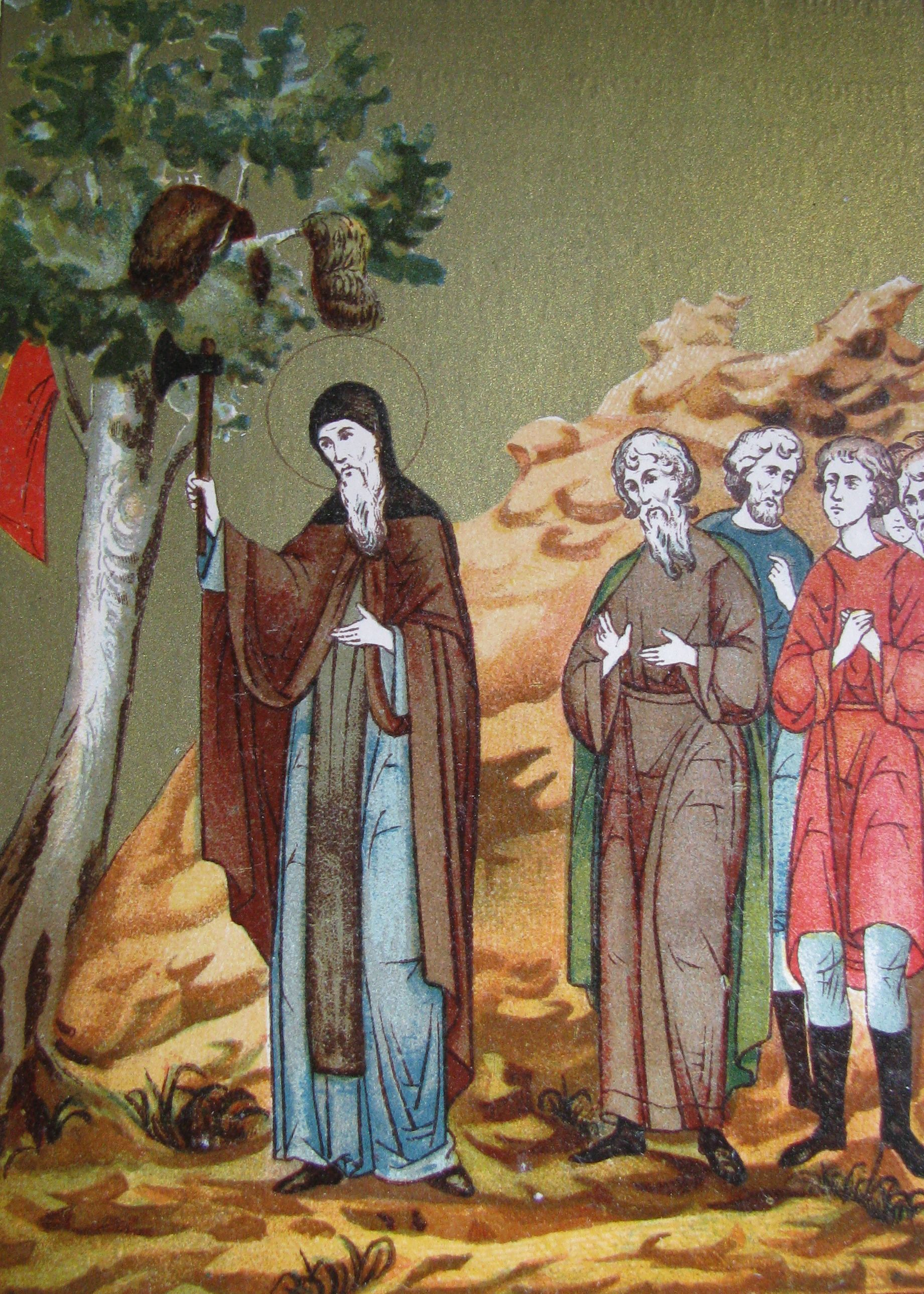
Saint Stephen cutting down a birch tree worshipped by pagans

Stephen was born around 1340 in the town of Ustyug in northern Russia. The region was populated by the native Komi, also known as Zyrians or western Permians, with a minority of Russians. His father was a cathedral cleric in the town. Early on, Stephen mastered the reading and writing of the Russian language and became a lector.

Stephen took his monastic vows in Rostov, where he learned Greek and learned his trade as a copyist. He befriended Epihanius, who became the biographer of Sergius of Radonezh (c. 1314–1392) and later Stephen as well. He also befriended Sergius, though he would not become a disciple of his. Around 1370, Stephen began creating an alphabet for the Zyrians, without the influence of Russian on it, despite the prevalence of the trilingual heresy in some Byzantine and Russian circles.

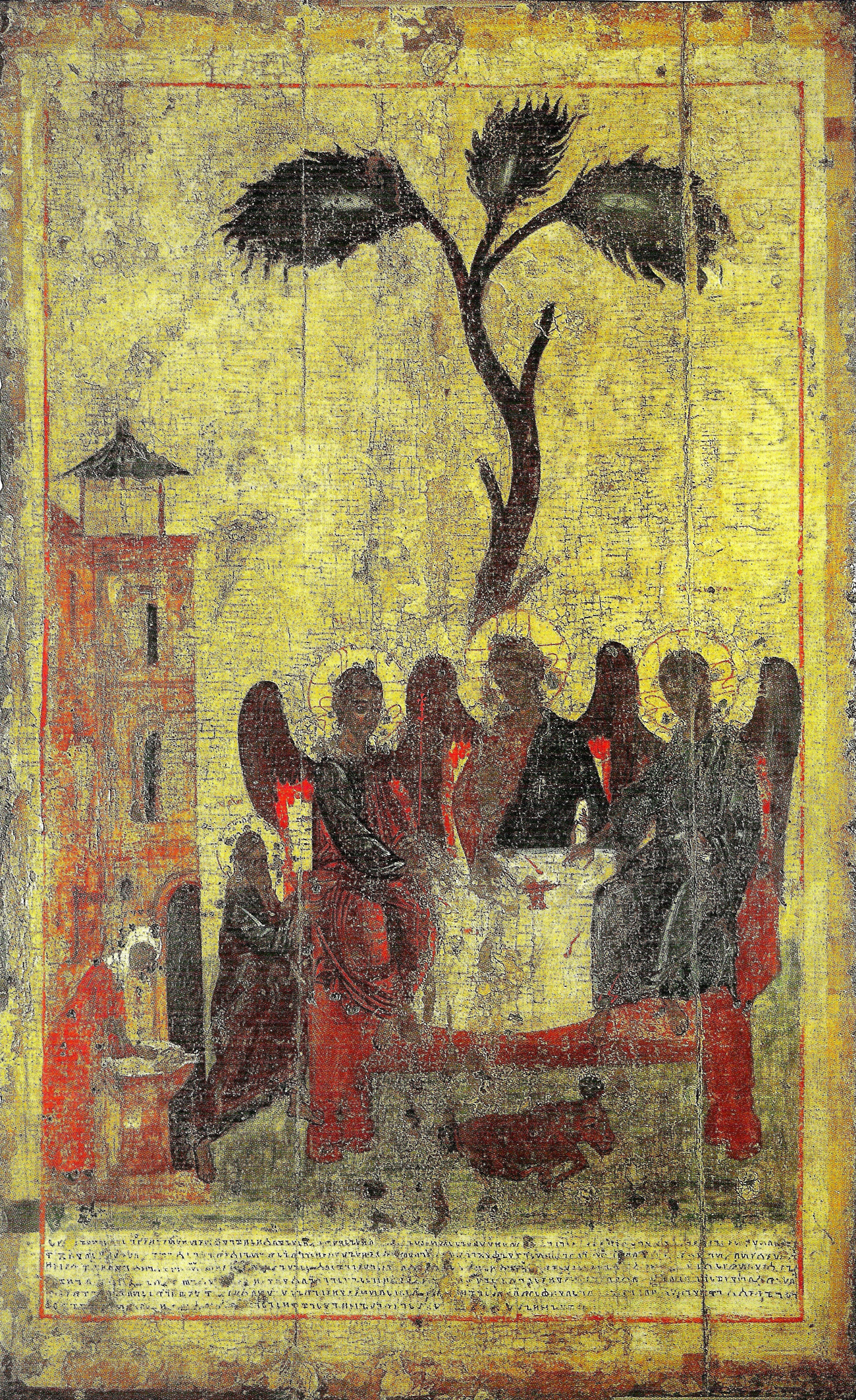
Zyrian Trinity icon painted by Stephen of Perm, late 14th century

In 1376, he voyaged to lands along the Vychegda and Vym rivers, and it was then that he engaged in the conversion of the Zyrians (Komi peoples). Rather than imposing Latin or Church Slavonic on the indigenous pagan populace, as all the contemporary missionaries did, Stephen learnt their language and traditions and worked out a distinct writing system for their use, creating the second oldest writing system for a Uralic language. Although his destruction of pagan idols (e.g., holy birches) earned him the wrath of some Permians, the head of the Russian Orthodox Church, Pimen, created the bishopric of Perm in 1383 and consecrated Stephen as its first bishop.

The effect of the new bishopric and the conversion of the Vychegda Perm threatened the control that Novgorod had been enjoying over the region's tribute. In 1385, Aleksei, the archbishop of Novgorod (r. 1359–1388), sent a Novgorodian army to oust the new establishment, but the new bishopric, with the help of the city of Ustyug, was able to defeat it. In 1386, Stephen visited Novgorod, and the city and its archbishop formally acknowledged the new situation. The conclusion of a peace agreement brought an end to Novgorod's claims against the diocese. Subsequently, the region's tribute became the luxury of Moscow. These events had immense repercussions for the future of northern Russia, and formed but one part of a larger trend which saw more and more of the Finnic North and its precious pelts passing from the control of Novgorod to Moscow.

Stephen died in Moscow on 26 April 1396. He was canonized as a saint by the Russian Orthodox Church in 1549.

== Legacy ==
The historian Serge Aleksandrovich Zenkovsky wrote that Stephen of Perm, along with Epiphanius the Wise, Sergius of Radonezh, and the great painter Andrei Rublev, signified "the Russian spiritual and cultural revival of the late fourteenth and early fifteenth century". Indeed, Stephen's life encapsulates both the political and religious expansion of "Muscovite" Russia. Stephen's life was in fact commemorated in the writings of the aforementioned Epiphanius, who famously wrote the Panegyric to Saint Stephen of Perm, a text that praises Stephen for his evangelical activities, and styles him the "creator of Permian letters".

== Bibliography ==
- "Стефан Пермский" . Brockhaus and Efron Encyclopedic Dictionary (in Russian). 1906.
- Greene, Robert H. (2014). Orthodox Christianity in Imperial Russia: A Source Book on Lived Religion. Bloomington: Indiana University Press. pp. 139–151. ISBN 978-0-253-01318-7.
- Limerov, Pavel (25 October 2010). "St. Stefan of Perm': A Dialogue between Traditions and the Tradition of Dialogue". Folklorica. 15 (0). doi:10.17161/folklorica.v15i0.4023.
- Martin, Janet (1995). Medieval Russia, 980–1584. Cambridge: Cambridge University Press. pp. 225–226.
- Zenkovsky, Serge A., ed. (1974). Medieval Russia's Epics, Chronicles, and Tales (Revised ed.). New York: New York University Press. pp. 259–262.
