= Vychegda Perm =

Medieval Komi state and historical region along the Vychegda River

Principality of Vychegda Perm
- 1187–1481
- Vychegda Perm was based along the Vychegda River
- Common languages: Komi; Old East Slavic
- Religion: Komi polytheism, Russian Orthodox
- History
  - First mention: 1187
  - Becomes a vassal of the Novgorod Republic: ~1300
  - Transferred to the Grand Duchy of Moscow as a vassal: 1383
  - Annexed by Grand Duchy of Moscow: 1481
Succeeded by
Grand Duchy of Moscow

Vychegda Perm, also known as Little Perm or Old Perm, was a medieval state and later vassal of the Novgorod Republic and Muscovy, which was based in along the Vychegda River. Vychegda Perm was originally a tribal state and was an important fur trading hub, which was valuable to the Novgorod, leading to the Novgorodian seizure of Vychegda Perm in the early 14th century. Vychegda Perm was populated by the Permian and Komi peoples and the region was converted to Eastern Orthodox Christianity by St. Stefan of Perm, beginning in 1378–1379.

The conversion of the region led Moscow and Novgorod into immediate risk of conflict, with Stefan having converted the region for the Muscovites, leading it into question who the Permians were to pay tribute to. Novgorod Republic ceded the region to Moscow in 1383.

== See also ==
- Great Perm
- Bjarmaland
