= Epiphanius the Wise =

Russian monk and hagiographer (died c. 1420)

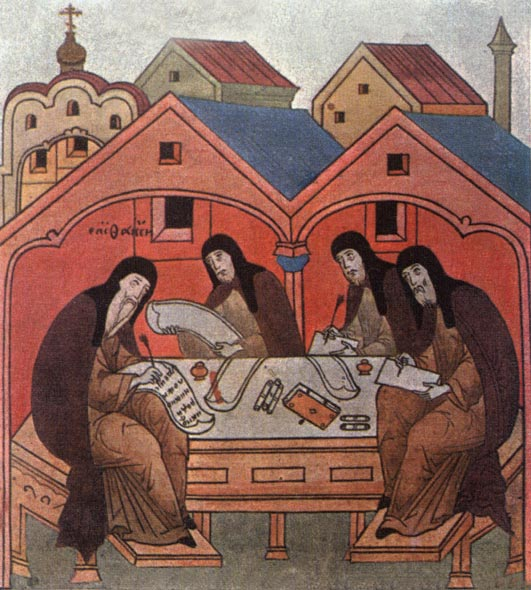
Epiphanius at work, miniature from a 16th-century manuscript

Epiphanius the Wise (Russian: Епифаний Премудрый, romanized: Epifany Premudry; died c. 1420) was a Russian Orthodox monk and hagiographer. He was a disciple of Sergius of Radonezh.

Historian Serge Aleksandrovich Zenkovsky wrote that Epiphanius, along with Stephen of Perm, Sergius of Radonezh, and the painter Andrei Rublev, signified "the Russian spiritual and cultural revival of the late fourteenth and early fifteenth century".

== Life ==
Epiphanius was born in Rostov in the first half of the 14th-century. As a young man, he joined the monastery of Gregory the Theologian in Rostov. There he learned to copy manuscripts and paint icons. He would also have learned Greek and the Greek hagiographic traditions. Later he went to Trinity Monastery, a house founded by Sergius of Radonezh in 1337.

Epiphanius travelled extensively, and is known to have visited Moscow, Constantinople and Mount Athos.

== Works ==
Epiphanius wrote at least three works: the Life of Stephen of Perm, the Life of Sergius of Radonezh, and the Encomium of Sergius. Boris Kloss argues that he is also the author of the Trinity Chronicle.

Epiphanius started to write the Life of Sergius a year after the death of the saint according to his own memories and his recollection of the accounts of other contemporaries. He finished the writings 26 years after the death of Sergius, i.e., around 1417–1418. There was a rewriting of the work by Pachomius the Serb (Пахомий Серб), which is usually more readily available. The Life of Sergius follows well established hagiographical conventions, and contains a number of parallels to scriptural passages. His focus is on the saint's spiritual qualities and therefore does not dwell on his close ties to Prince Dmitry Donskoy. Epiphanius was interested in portraying an idealized account of sanctity, and did so through lengthy panegyrics. His literary style was given the name pletenie sloves, or "the weaving/braiding of words", and is marked by an abundance of neologisms, in which Epiphanius liked to form a large number of noun or adjective-noun combinations. The ordinary words of a common man "...are incapable of expressing the greatness of the deeds done by holy men to the glory of Christ."

Serge Zenkovsky hails Epiphanius' writings as "a new page in Russian literary history". It is often thought that Epiphanius' new style was influenced by the contemporary surge in Russian painting, and it has been noted that Epiphanius was a great admirer of Theophanes the Greek. A 1413 letter of Epiphanius, who knew Theophanes, to Cyril of Beloozero provides the principal source of information about the great icon painter.

== Sources ==
- "Епифаний Премудрый" . Brockhaus and Efron Encyclopedic Dictionary (in Russian). 1906.
- Martin, Janet, Medieval Russia, 980-1584, (Cambridge, 1995), pp. 230, 232
- Zenkovsky, Serge A. (ed.), Medieval Russia's Epics, Chronicles, and Tales, Revised Edition, (New York, 1974), pp. 259–89
