= St. Sergius of Radonezh Church, Riga =

Church in Riga, Latvia

Coordinates: 56.9636°N 24.1481°E

St. Sergius of Radonezh Church (Latvian: Svētā Radoņežas Sergija pareizticīgo baznīca) is an Eastern Orthodox church in Riga, the capital of Latvia. The church is situated at the address 126 Krišjānis Barons Street. Church patron is Sergius of Radonezh.
