= Permians =

Peoples who speak Permic languages

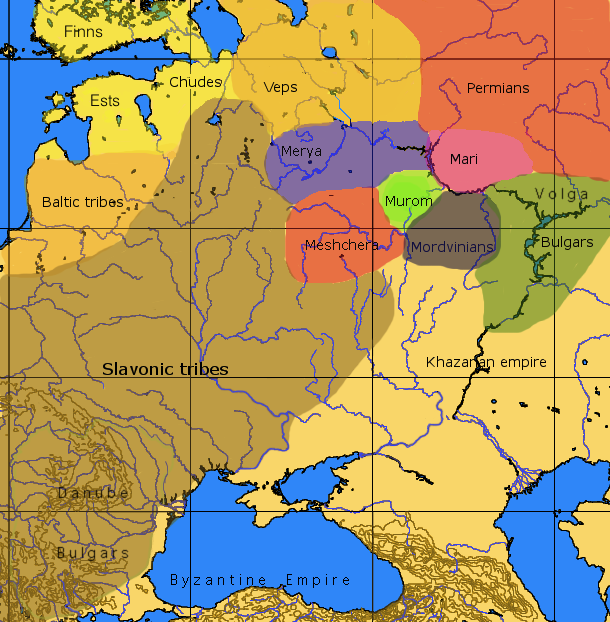
Volga Finns, Baltic Finns, Slavs and Khazars in the 9th century; Permians marked with red

The Permians (Note: Occasionally referred to as Perm Finns or Permian Finns.) are the peoples who speak the Permic languages, a branch of the Uralic language family, which includes Komis, Udmurts, and Besermyans.

== History ==
The ancestors of the Permians originally inhabited the land called Permia covering the middle and upper Kama River. Permians split into two groups, probably during the 9th century.

The Komis came under the rule of the Novgorod Republic in the 13th century and were converted to Russian Orthodoxy in the 1360s and 1370s. From 1471 to 1478, their lands were conquered by the Grand Duchy of Moscow, which would later become the Tsardom of Russia. In the 18th century, the Russian authorities opened the southern parts of the land to colonization and the northern parts became a place to which criminal and political prisoners were exiled.

The Udmurts came under the rule of the Mongols, the Golden Horde and the Khanate of Kazan until their land was ceded to Russia, and the people were Christianized at the beginning of the 18th century.

A connection between Permians and Bjarmians, a northern people mentioned in Old Norse sources, has been suggested. Recent research on the Finno-Ugric substrate in northern Russian dialects suggests that in Bjarmaland there once lived speakers of other Finno-Ugric languages beside the Permians.

== See also ==
- Chud
- Vychegda Perm
