= Berdyshevka =

Location
- Country: Russia

Physical characteristics
- Mouth: Vychegda
  - coordinates: 61.6142°N 48.0672°E
- Length: 17 km (11 mi)

Basin features
- Progression: Vychegda→ Northern Dvina→ White Sea

The Berdyshevka (Russian: Бердышевка) is a river in Russia, flows in Arkhangelsk Oblast. It is 17 km long, and its mouth is 102 km on the right bank of the Vychegda.
