= Yugra campaigns =

Military campaigns in Russia from 1465 to 1500

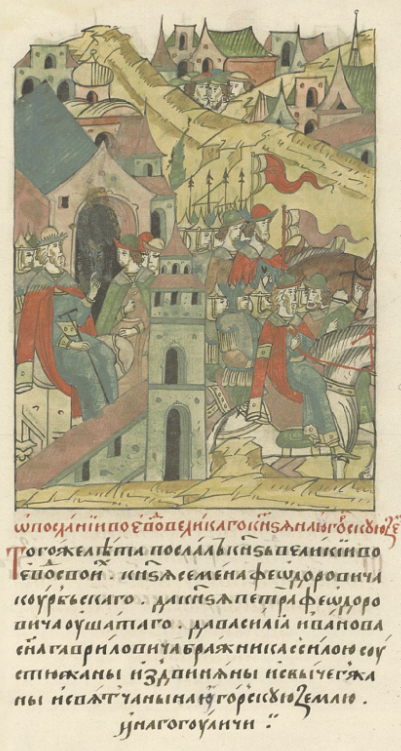
Ivan III sends his commanders to Yugra in 1499, miniature from the Illustrated Chronicle of Ivan the Terrible

The Yugra campaigns (Russian: Югорские походы) were a series of military campaigns against the principalities of Yugra undertaken by the Grand Principality of Moscow during the reign of Ivan III. The campaigns began in 1465 and ended in 1499–1500, leading to the Russians to increase their dominance in the region.

Prior to the campaigns by Moscow, the rival city-state of Novgorod had laid claim to the region and launched numerous military expeditions to collect tribute. The first campaign by Moscow in 1465 led to the capture of the princes of Yugra and a tribute was imposed. Following the second campaign in 1483, Yugra was included in the title of the grand prince and the princes of Yugra swore allegiance to Ivan. The final and largest campaign in 1499–1500 once again re-established Russian dominance in the region.

== Background ==
The Novgorodians were aware of the lands of Yugra from at least the 11th century, if not earlier, and launched expeditions to the region. The Novgorodians established trade relations, exchanging iron artefacts and textiles for fur, but they also launched military campaigns to collect tribute from the local population. The campaigns often met resistance, such as two expeditions in 1187 and 1193 mentioned in chronicles that were defeated.

Similar events are mentioned in the following centuries, such as in 1445, when two commanders and an army of 3,000 marched into Yugra:

They seized many Yugrian people and their women and children, who were terrified. But the Yugrians succeeded in deceiving them, saying 'we shall give you tribute...', but meanwhile they gathered together and struck at Vasiliy's fort, and they killed as many as eighty good [Russian] people, of boyar line and gallant people, and it was pitiful to hear the slaughter.

— Novgorod First Chronicle

In the Novgorodian treaty agreements of the 13th to 15th centuries, the Yugra volost is noted among other possessions of the Novgorod Republic; however, as the treaties are only known from 1264 onwards, it is not known exactly when Novgorod started to consider Yugra as one of its possessions. After Novgorod was annexed by Moscow in the 15th century, the newly emerging centralized Russian state also laid claim to the region.

== Campaigns ==
=== 1465 ===
As Great Perm was included in the sphere of influence of the Grand Principality of Moscow, the lands of Yugra also attracted increased interest in Moscow, as it had been paying tribute to Novgorod. According to the northern chronicles, the first Muscovite campaign against Yugra was carried out in 1465 by forces from Ustyug and the Vym, by order of Ivan III. Although some historians believed that the first campaign was carried out in 1483, after Novgorod was annexed, the 1465 campaign was carried out before Novgorod was annexed, and after Ivan III received power over the northern cities.

According to the Ustyug Chronicle, Ivan III ordered Vasily Skryaba, a native of Ustyug, to launch a campaign against Yugra. An army was assembled from volunteers and people of the Vym, and numbered more than a thousand people. The army brought back many captives, including the princes of Yugra. According to the chronicle, Ivan III sent them back to Yugra and imposed a tribute. The Arkhangelsk Chronicle provides more detail about the 1465 campaign, saying that the Russian army had secured Yugra for Ivan III, who granted the captured princes authority over their principalities and imposed a tribute.

=== 1483 ===
Ivan III sent another army in 1483 to fight against the Mansi and Khanty nobility and to collect tribute. The campaign was carried out by the Ob and Irtysh rivers under the command of Ivan Ivanovich Saltyk and Fyodor Semyonovich Kurbsky. According to the chronicle, the campaign involved boyar children from the grand prince's court, as well as forces from the northern cities. According to the Ustyug Chronicle, the Russian army defeated the Mansi, then moved along the Tavda to the Irtysh and Ob rivers, where they defeated the princes of Yugra.

On 14 March 1484, Ivan III included Yugra in his title for the first time, which established Russian power over Yugra. In the spring of 1484, the princes of Yugra swore allegiance to Ivan III.

=== 1499–1500 ===
The largest campaign of Russian troops against Yugra was carried out in 1499–1500. According to information in razriady (register books), over four thousand people took part in the campaign under the command of Semyon Kurbsky, Pyotr Ushaty, and Vasily Ivanovich. The army used skis during battle.

Under the year 7007 (1499), the Grand Princely Chronicle says:

In the same year, the grand prince sent his voivodes Prince Semyon Fyodorovich Kurbsky, Prince Pyotr Fyodorovich Ushaty, and Vasily Brazhnik, with a force from Ustyug, the Dvina, the Vychegda and Vyatka to Yugra and the Gogulichs. And they, having went, took the towns and conquered the land, and having captured the princes, brought them to Moscow, and other princes and local people they made swear an oath, according to their faith, to the grand prince, and other princes and many Yugrians and Gogulichs they killed there. And they came to Moscow to the grand prince all healthily in the year 7008, in March. (Note: Того же лета послал князь великий воевод своих, князя Семена Федоровича Курбского, да князя Петра Федоровича Ушатого, да Василья Бражника с силою с Устюжаны, и з Двинианы, и с Вытчане, и с Вятчане на Югорскую землю и на Гогулыч. Они же, шедше, городы поимаша, и землю повоеваша, и князей, поимав, приведоша на Москву, а иных князей и земских людей к роте приведоша по их вере за великого князя, а иных князей и многих людей Югричь и Гогулыч тамо побиша. И приидоша на Москву к великому князю все здоровы лета 7008-го, Марта.)

— Grand Princely Chronicle

The Vologda-Perm Chronicle contains additional information, including the exact dates of departure:

In the year 7000 on the seventh, of March at 12, the grand prince... sent his military leaders, Prince Semyon Fyodorovich Kurbsky, Prince Pyotr Fyodorovich Ushaty, and Vasily Ivanovich Brazhnik to the Novgorodian land to Kada and to the Gogulichs. And with them, people from Ustyug, Vyatka, Perm, the Dvina, the Vaga, and the Pechora. (Note: В лето 7000 седьмого, Марта в 12, князь великий... послал воевод своих ратью, князя Семена Федоровича Курбского, да князя Петра Федоровича Ушатого, да Василия Ивановича Бражника в Новгородскую землю в Каду и на Готлугу. А с ними Устожане, Вятчане, Пермян, Двиняне, Важане, Печаняне.)

— Vologda-Perm Chronicle

== Aftermath ==
Sigismund von Herberstein, an ambassador of the Holy Roman Empire sent to Russia in 1517 and 1526, referred to a "Russian road guide" that came into his possession for geographical data on the northern Urals and Siberia, which indicated that the territories were well known at the time.

In 1556, following the recognition of Russian authority over the Khanate of Sibir, a letter from Ivan the Terrible was sent to the princes of Yugra, in which the land was called "our patrimony", indicating that Moscow considered Yugra to be part of the Russian state, according to the political terminology of the time. By the end of the 16th century, northwest Siberia became part of the Tsardom of Russia. The Russian campaign in Siberia, spearheaded by the Cossacks, and the founding of new cities, including Tyumen in 1586, Tobolsk in 1587, Berezovo in 1593, and Surgut in 1594, completed the process of integrating the tribes into the state.

== Bibliography ==
- Alekseyev, Yury Georgiyevich [in Russian] (2009). Походы русских войск при Иване III [Russian military campaigns under Ivan III] (in Russian). Saint Petersburg: СПб.: Изд-во С.-Петерб. pp. 366–369. ISBN 978-5-288-04840-1.
- Forsyth, James (8 September 1994). A History of the Peoples of Siberia: Russia's North Asian Colony 1581-1990. Cambridge University Press. ISBN 978-0-521-47771-0.
- Naumov, Igor V. (22 November 2006). The History of Siberia. Routledge. ISBN 978-1-134-20703-9.
- Puzanov, V. D. (2014). "Русские походы в Югру XI - XVI вв" [Russian campaigns to Yugra in the 11th to 16th centuries]. История и археология (in Russian).
