= Sergius of Radonezh =

Russian saint and reformer (1314–1392)

Saint Sergius of Radonezh
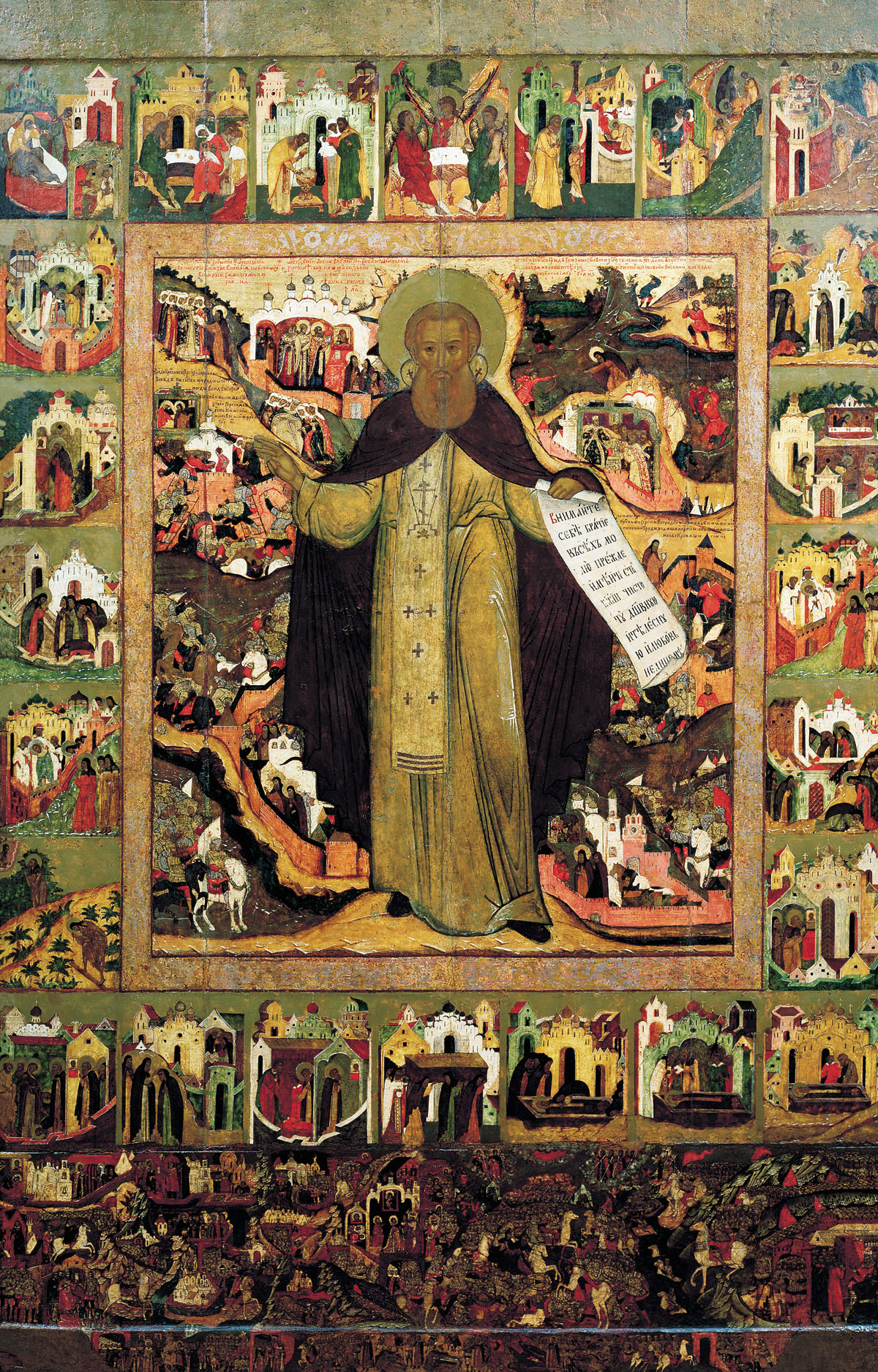
- Icon of Sergius of Radonezh, 17th century

Abbot of Radonezh, Miracle Worker of all Russia Russian Monastic Reformer, Teacher of the Faith
- Born: 14 May 1314; Varnitsa, Rostov Veliky
- Died: 25 September 1392 (aged 78); Trinity Lavra of St. Sergius
- Venerated in: Eastern Orthodox Church; Catholic Church; Anglican Communion; Lutheranism
- Canonized: 1452 or 1448
- Major shrine: Trinity Lavra of St. Sergius
- Feast: Repose: 25 September / 8 October; Uncovering of Relics: 5 July / 18 July
- Attributes: Dressed as a monk, sometimes with paterissa (abbot's staff)
- Patronage: Russia

Sergius of Radonezh (Russian: Сергий Радонежский, romanized: Sergiy Radonezhsky; 14 May 1314 – 25 September 1392) was a Russian Orthodox spiritual leader and monastic reformer.

He was the founder of the Trinity Lavra of St. Sergius near Moscow, what is now the most venerated monastic house in Russia. He exerted the greatest influence of any personage on the Russian Orthodox Church. Together with Seraphim of Sarov, he is one of the most highly venerated saints in Russia.

Historian Serge Aleksandrovich Zenkovsky wrote that Sergius, along with Epiphanius the Wise, Stephen of Perm, and the painter Andrei Rublev, signified "the Russian spiritual and cultural revival of the late fourteenth and early fifteenth century".

== Early life ==
The date of his birth is unclear: it could be 1314, 1319, or 1322. His medieval biography states that he was born to Kiril and Maria, a boyar family, near Rostov Veliky, on the spot where Varnitsy Monastery now stands.

The narrative of Epiphanius does not specify the exact birthplace of the monk, stating only that before the migration from Rostov principality the monk's family lived "in a village in the area, which is within the Rostov principality, not very close to the city of Rostov". It is considered that it is the village Varnitsa (Russian: Варница) near Rostov Veliky. Sergius received the baptismal name of Bartholomew (Russian: Варѳоломе́й, romanized: Varfolomei) in honor of the Apostle Bartholomew.

Although an intelligent boy, Bartholomew had great difficulty learning to read. His biography states that a starets (spiritual elder) met him one day and gave him a piece of prosphora (holy bread) to eat, and from that day forward he was able to read. Orthodox Christians interpret the incident as being an angelic visitation.

When the Rostov principality fell into the hands of Ivan I of Moscow, his parents Kirill and Maria became impoverished and moved to the village of Radonezh together with their three sons, Stefan, Bartholomew and Peter.

== Monastic life ==
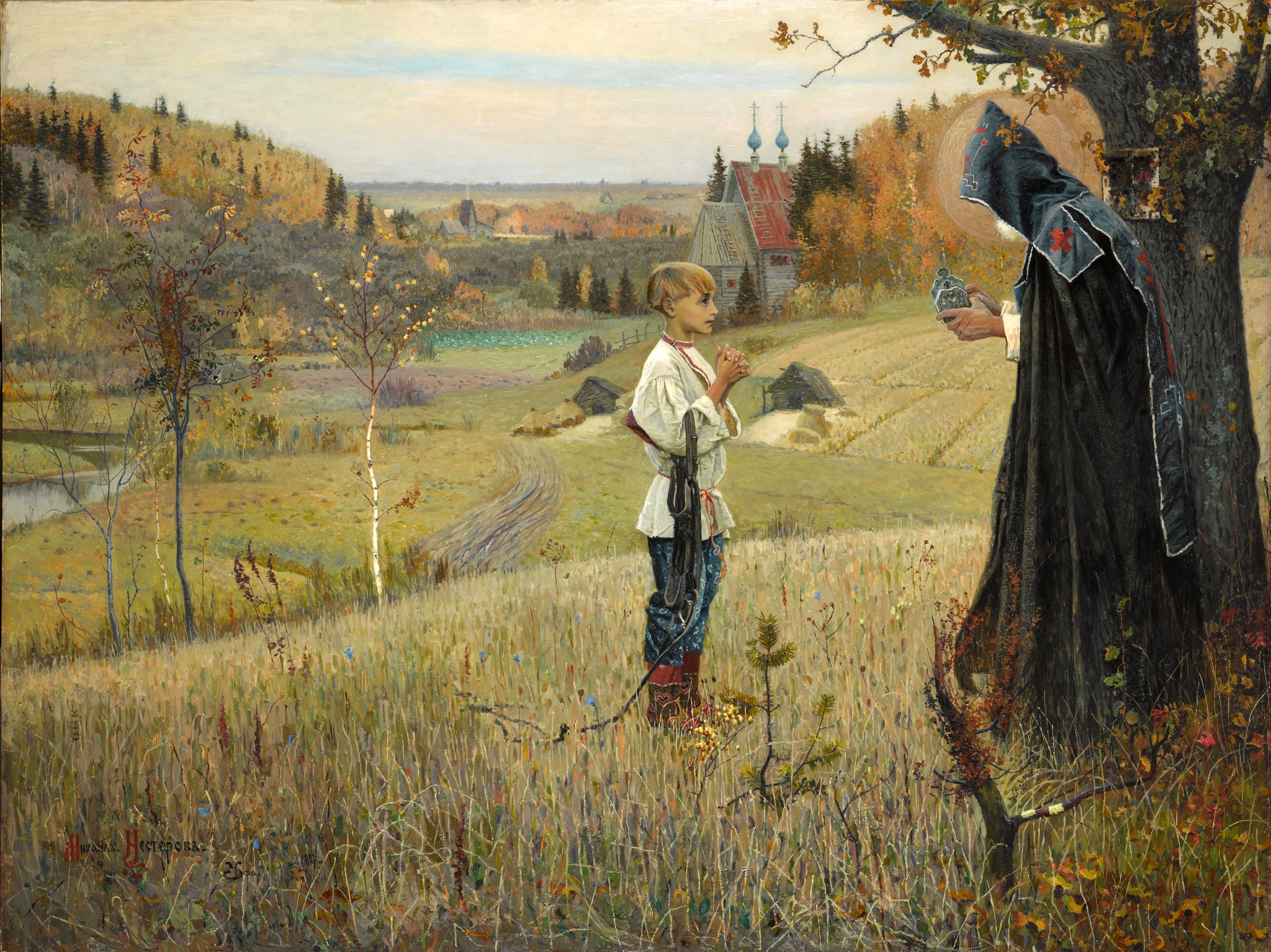
Vision to the Youth Bartholomew, by Mikhail Nesterov (1890).

Upon his parents' death, Bartholomew went to Khotkovo near Moscow, where his older brother Stefan was a monk. He persuaded Stefan to find a more secluded place to live the ascetic life. In the deep forest at Makovets Hill they decided to build a small monastic cell and a church dedicated in honor of the Trinity. Thus started the history of the great Trinity-St. Sergius Lavra.

In time, Stefan moved to a monastery in Moscow. Varfolomei (Bartholomew) was tonsured a monk and given the name Sergius, following which he spent more than a year in the forest alone as a hermit. Soon, however, other monks started coming to him and building their own cells. After some time, they persuaded him to become their hegumen (abbot) and he was ordained to the priesthood. Following his example, all the monks had to live by their own labor. Over time, more and more monks and donations came to this place. Nearby, there appeared a posad, which grew into the town of Sergiev Posad, and other villages.

When the news of Sergius's accomplishments reached Patriarch Philotheus of Constantinople, Philotheus sent a monastic charter to Sergius. During the reign of Dmitri Donskoi, his disciples started to spread his teaching across central and northern Russia. They settled intentionally in the most impracticable places and founded numerous monasteries, of which Borisoglebsky, Ferapontov, Kirillo-Belozersky and Vysotsky monasteries could be mentioned. Sergius was also connected with the foundation of two monastic communities in Moscow, Andronikov and Simonov monasteries. All in all, the disciples of Sergius founded about 40 monasteries, thus greatly extending the geographical extent of his influence and authority. Metropolitan Alexius, Metropolitan of Moscow asked Sergius to become his successor but Sergius declined, preferring to remain a simple monk rather than be a bishop.

As an ascetic, Sergius did not take part in the political life of the country. However, he blessed Dmitry Donskoy when he went to fight the Tatars in the Battle of Kulikovo, but only after he was certain Dmitry had pursued all peaceful means of resolving the conflict. Sergius is said to have bestowed upon Dmitry the victory with the help of the monks Alexander Peresvet and Rodion Oslyabya. Some historians interpreted his political stance as aspiring to make peace and unite Russian lands under the leadership of Moscow.

== Death and canonization ==
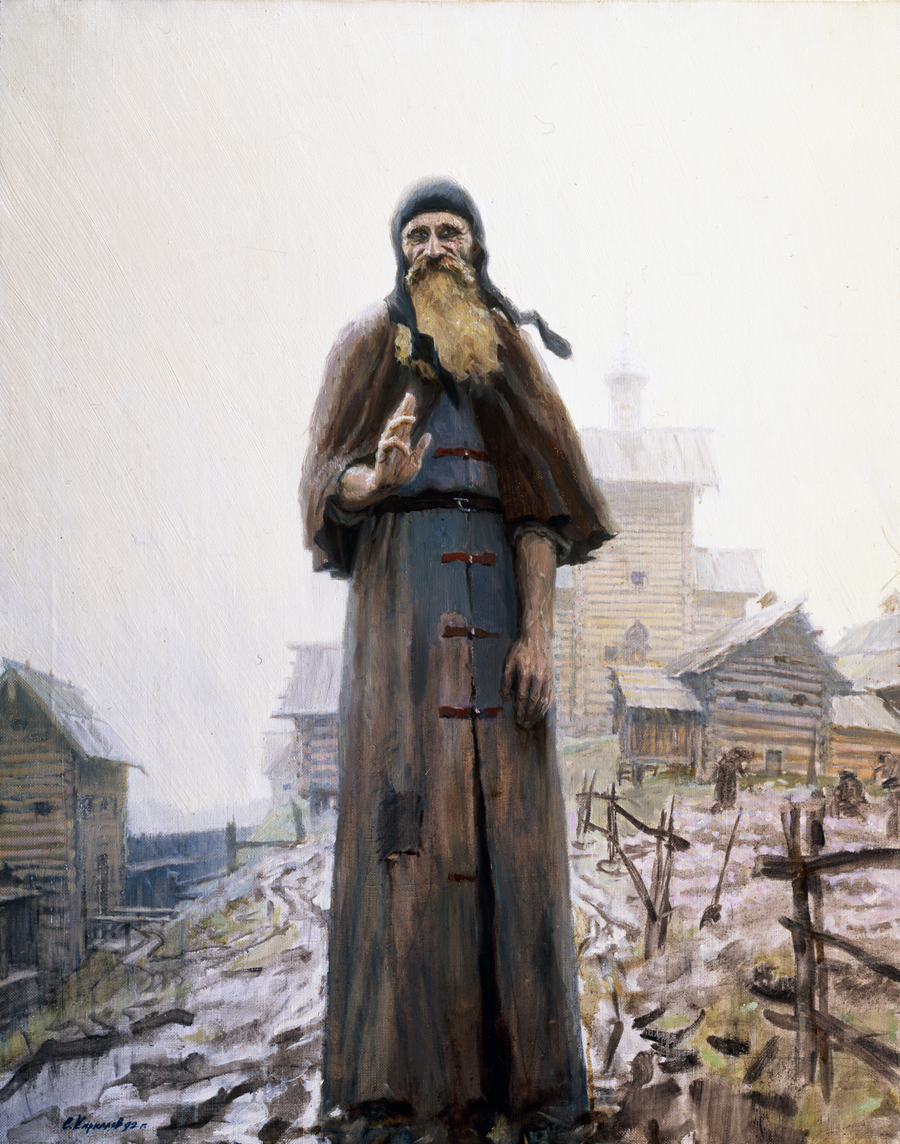
Sergius of Radonezh blessing by Sergei Kirillov

Sergius died on 25 September 1392. His incorrupt relics were found in 1422 and placed in the new cathedral of Troitse-Sergiyeva Lavra which he founded.

The exact year of his canonization by the Russian Orthodox Church is uncertain, either 1452 or 1448. The church commemorates him on September 25, the date of his death, and on July 5, the day his relics were uncovered. (See ). Among the many affectionate titles given to him, he has been referred to as the "Abbot of Russia" and "valiant voivod" of the Russian land.

The Catholic Church officially recognizes Sergius as a saint. In 1942, he was included in the menologion authorized for the Russian Greek Catholic Church. Moreover, the most recent edition of the Martyrologium Romanum, the 2004 edition of the martyrology of the Roman Rite, commemorates Sergius under the date of 25 September.

Sergius is honored in the Calendar of Saints of several churches of the Anglican Communion and is remembered in the Church of England with a commemoration on 25 September.

The ecumenical Fellowship of Saint Alban and Saint Sergius is named in part for him.

In December 1937, Pavel Florensky (1882–1937), a Russian theologian, priest, mathematician, inventor, philosopher and engineer died in the Soviet Gulag and it is thought he was condemned by an extrajudicial NKVD troika under NKVD Order No. 00447 to be executed during the 1930s Bolshevik purges after refusing to disclose the hiding place of Sergius' head which the Bolsheviks wanted destroyed. It is rumored that Florensky and other theologians were involved in a plot to save and hide the relics of St. Sergius. The relics were returned by Pavel Golubtsov, later "Archbishop Sergius", to the cathedral of Troitse-Sergiyeva Lavra in 1946 when it was reopened.

== Legacy ==
Much information about Sergius and his acts is taken from the writing of his life composed in the 15th century, which has come down to us in many later editions in the 15th to 20th century Russian manuscripts. The memory of Sergius of Radonezh has lived on thanks to the unique manuscript entitled "The Life of St. Sergius of Radonezh" written by famous hagiographer Pachomius the Serb, also known as Pachomius Logothetes. The original manuscript is housed in the National Library of Russia.

The Trinity Chronicle writes about his death:

That autumn in the month of September on the 25th day, the feast day of the venerable saint Ephrosinia [of Alexandria] the venerable Abbot Sergius, that holy elder, so estimable, unimpeachable and benevolent, gentle humble, Saint Sergius of Radonezh plainspoken, whose life surpasseth anything one can say or write, died. Formerly no one like him existed in our land who was pleasing to God and [whom] tsars and princes deemed honorable, [who] drew praise from a patriarch, in whose life unbeliever tsars and princes marveled so that they sent him gifts; [who] was universally beloved for his saintly life, who was the shepherd not only of his flock but [was] the teacher and mentor of our entire Russian land; [who was] a guide to the blind, [who helped] the lame to walk, [who was] to the sick a healer, to the hungry and thirsty a provider, [who] clothed the naked, [who] gave solace to the miserable, [and] to all Christians was the beacon without whose prayers we sinners would not receive God's mercy, to the glory of God forever, amen.

— Trinity Chronicle

Historian Serge Aleksandrovich Zenkovsky wrote that Sergius, along with Epiphanius the Wise, Stephen of Perm, and the painter Andrei Rublev, signified "the Russian spiritual and cultural revival of the late fourteenth and early fifteenth century".

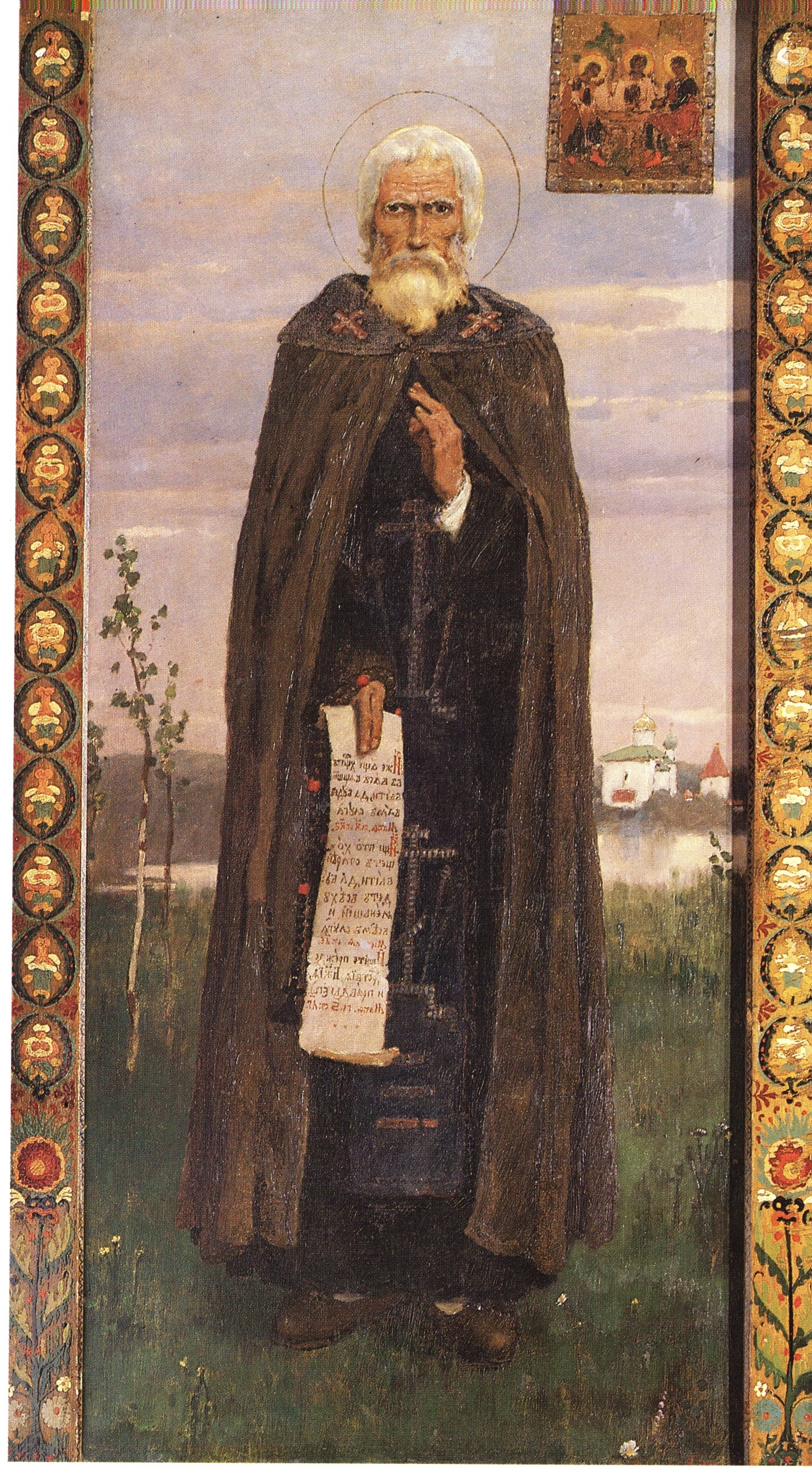
Icon of Sergius of Radonezh painted for Abramtsevo church by Viktor Vasnetsov, 1882.

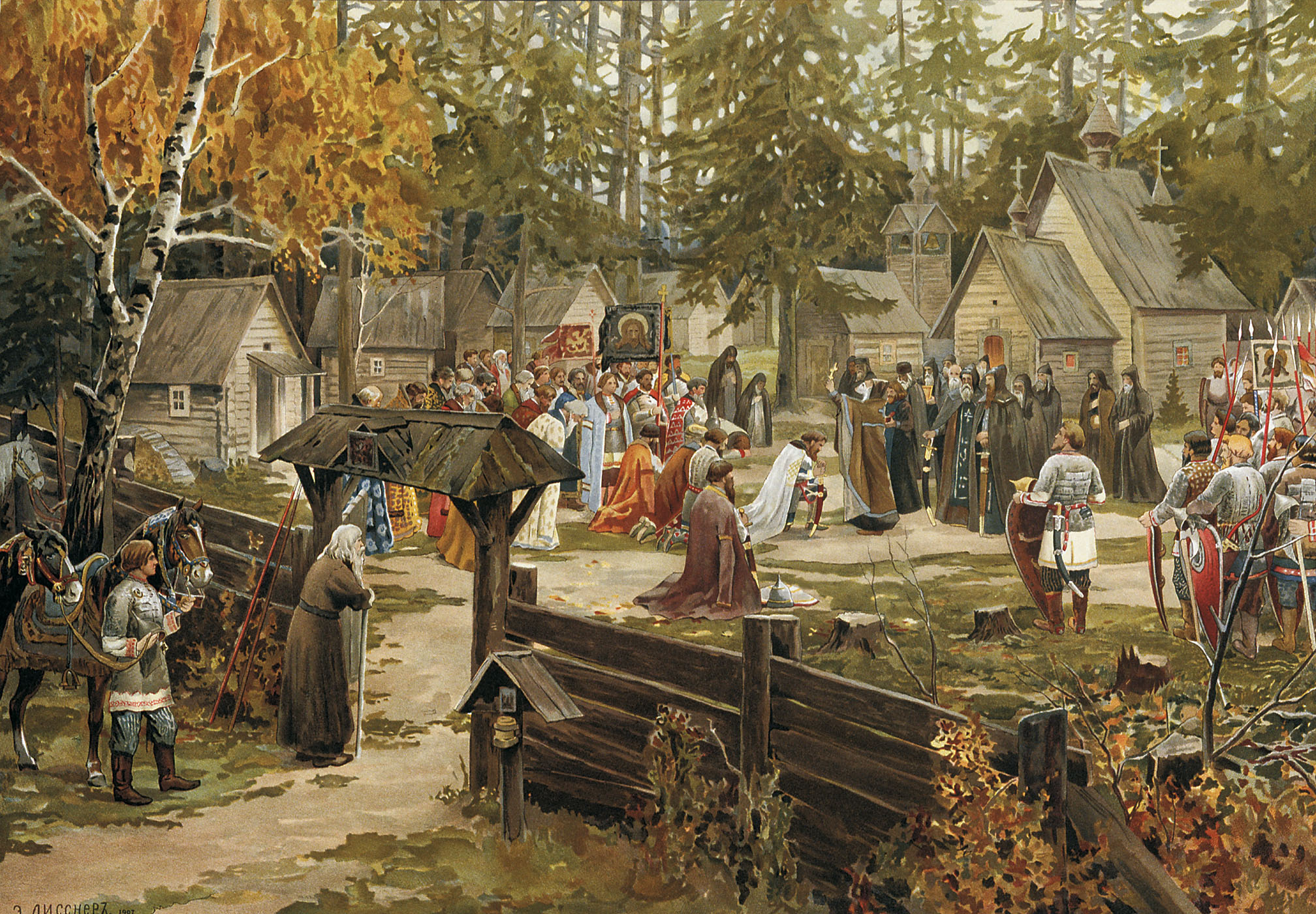
Sergius of Radonezh blessing Dmitri Donskoi before the Battle of Kulikovo in a painting by Ernst Lissner.

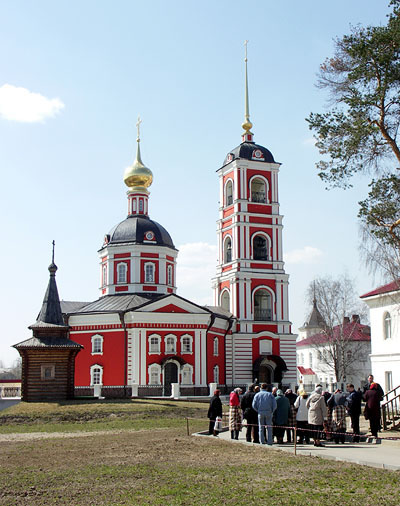
Varnitsy Monastery of St. Sergius commemorates the saint's birthplace.

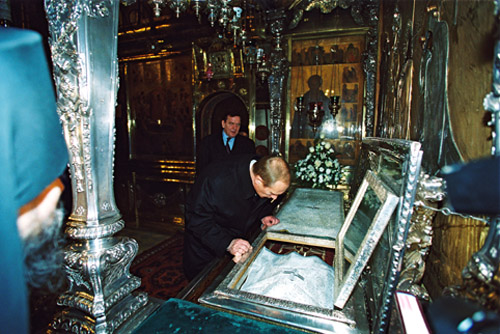
The reliquary containing the relics of Saint Sergius at the Catholicon of Holy Trinity-St. Sergius, Lavra, Sergiev Posad.

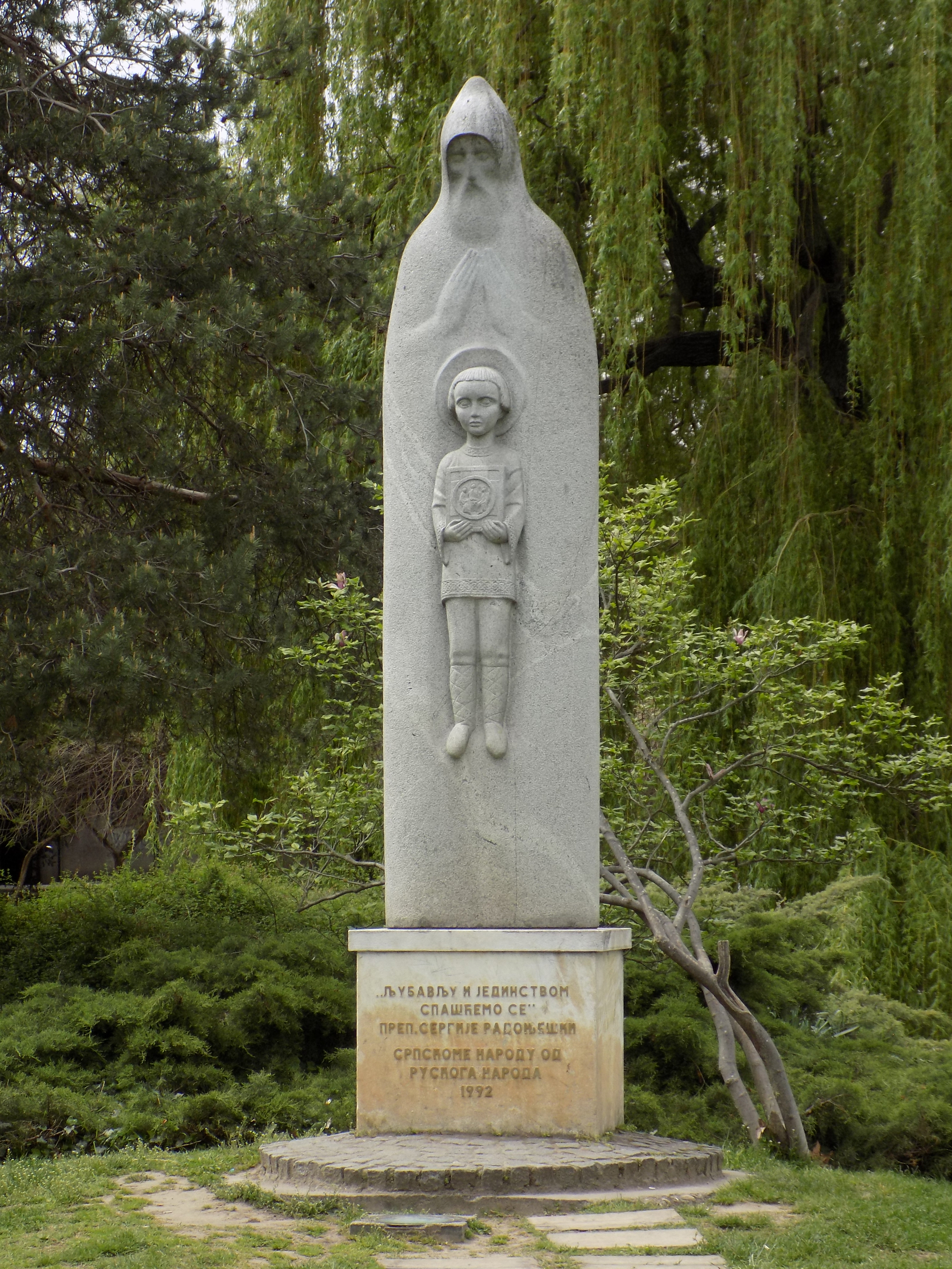
Statue of Saint Sergius of Radonezh by Vyacheslav Klykov in Danube Park, Novi Sad, Serbia, 1992.

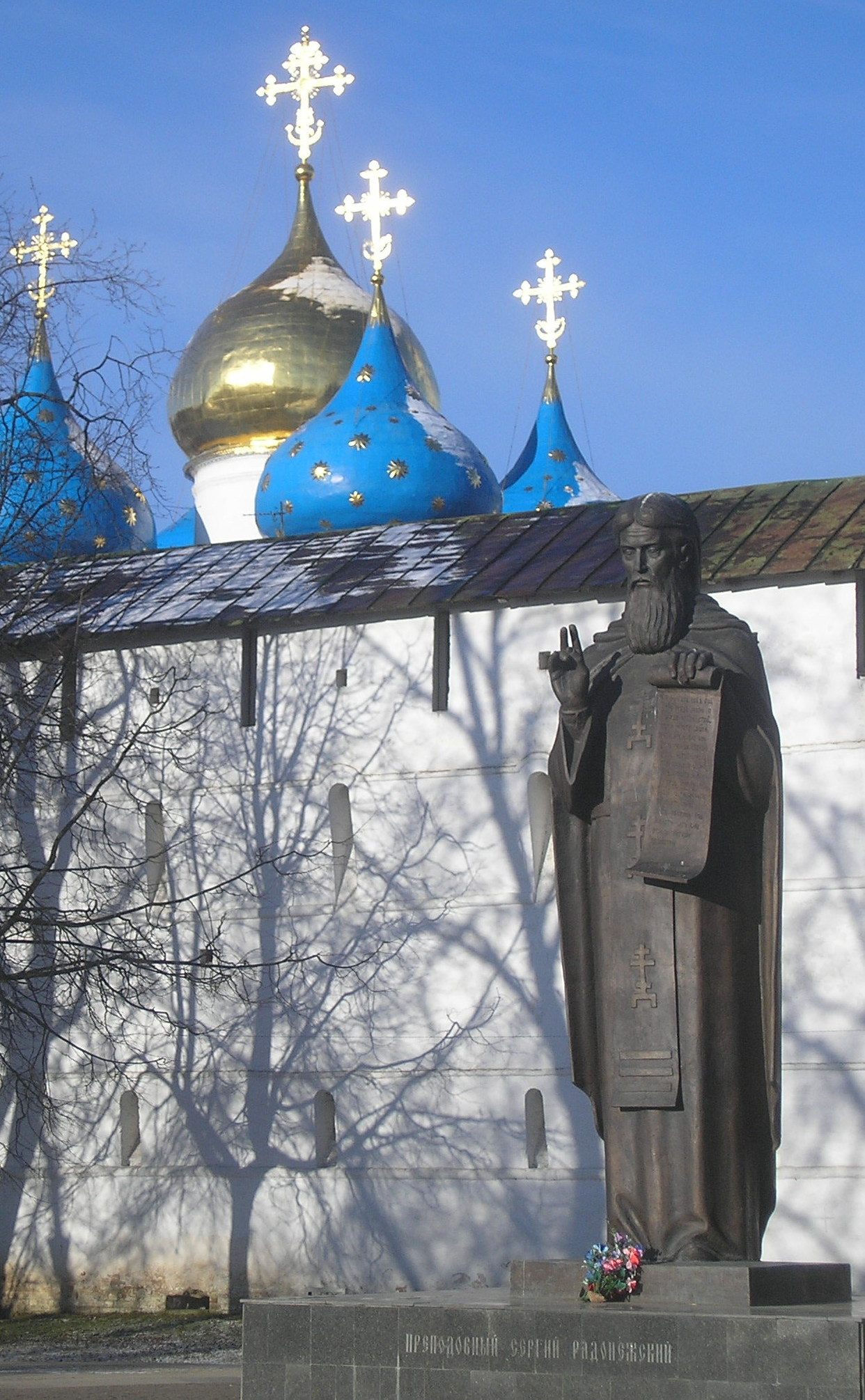
Statue of Sergius outside the Trinity Lavra

== Sources ==
- Kent, Neil (2021). A Concise History of the Russian Orthodox Church. Academica Press. ISBN 978-1-68053-907-3.
- Miller, David B. (5 November 2010). Saint Sergius of Radonezh, His Trinity Monastery, and the Formation of the Russian Identity. Cornell University Press. ISBN 978-1-5017-5661-0.
