= Ust-Vym =

Ust-Vym Усть-Вымь
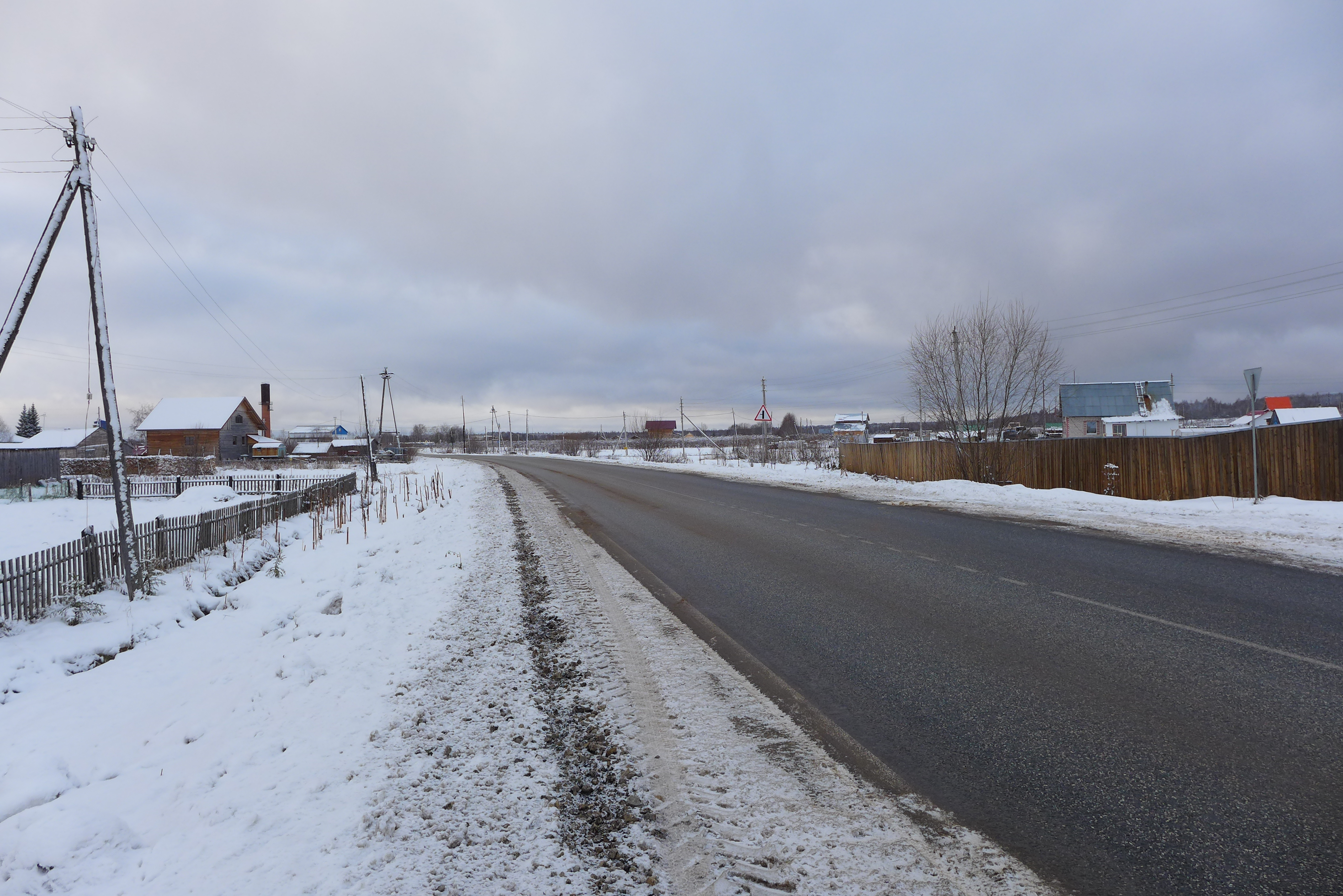
- Interactive map of Ust-Vym
- Location of Ust-Vym Ust-Vym (Komi Republic)
- Coordinates: 62°13′33″N 50°23′27″E
- Country: Russia
- Federal subject: Komi Republic
- Founded: 1380 (Julian)

Population
  - Estimate (2021): 628 )
- Time zone: UTC+3 (MSK)
- Postal code: 169110
- OKTMO ID: 87644440101

Ust-Vym (Russian: Усть-Вымь; Komi: Емдін, Jemdïn) is a rural locality (a selo) in Ust-Vymsky District of the Komi Republic, Russia, located by the mouth of the Vym River, from which it takes its name: "Ust-" is a common prefix it Russian toponymy for places by the mouth of a river, from the word устье, "river mouth". It is an administrative center of the Ust-Vym rural municipality, which includes several other villages.

An ancient monastery established in 1380 by Stephen of Perm, closed in 1764, and reopened in 1996 is located in Ust-Vym.

It is known as the headquarters of Ustvymlag Gulag labor camp.
