= Bjarmaland =

Territory mentioned in Norse sagas

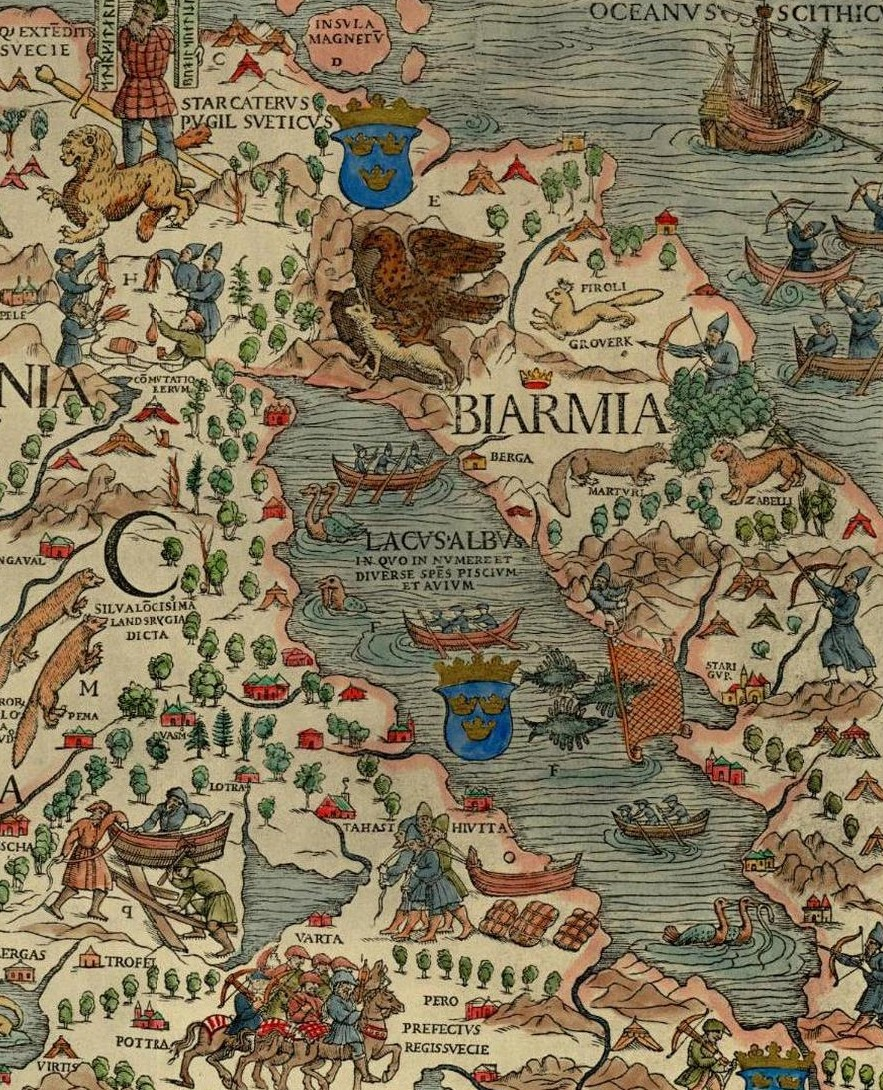
Bjarmaland (Biarmia) as illustrated in the Carta marina (1539) by Olaus Magnus

Bjarmaland (also spelled Bjarmland and Bjarmia) (Note: Latin: Biarmia; Old English: Beormaland; Komi: Биармия, romanized: Biarmia; Russian: Биармия, romanized: Biyarmiya.) was a territory mentioned in sagas from the Viking Age and in geographical accounts until the 16th century. The term is usually understood to have referred to the southern shores of the White Sea and the basin of the Northern Dvina (Finnish: Vienanjoki) as well as, presumably, to some of the surrounding areas. Those territories comprise a part of the Arkhangelsk Oblast of Russia, as well as the Kola Peninsula (also known as the Russian North).

== Norse voyagers in Bjarmaland ==
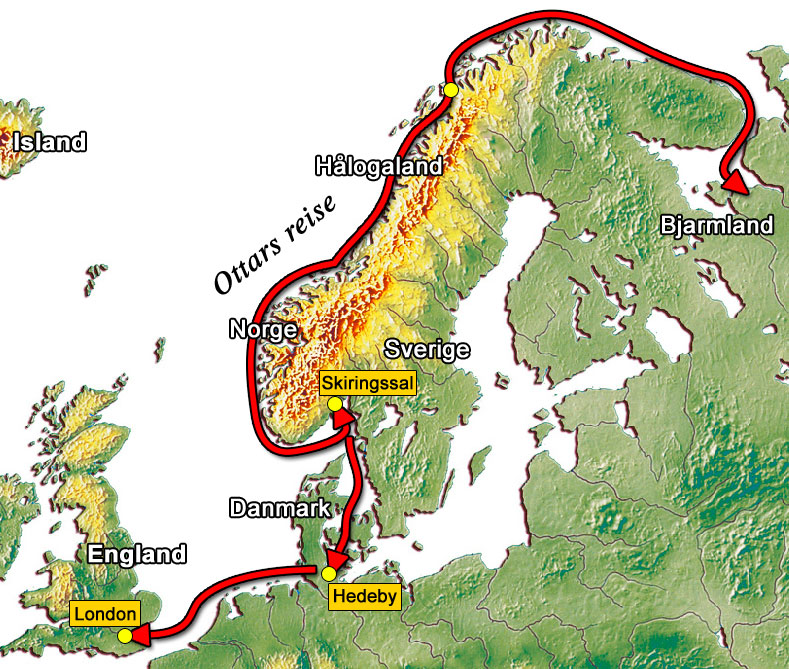
A Norwegian map of the voyage of Ohthere

According to the Voyage of Ohthere (c. 890 AD), the Norwegian merchant Ottar (Ohthere) reported to king Alfred the Great that he had sailed for 15 days along the northern coast and then southwards, finally arriving at a great river, probably the Northern Dvina. At the estuary of the river dwelt the Beormas, who unlike the nomadic Sami peoples were sedentary, and their land was rich and populous. Ohthere did not know their language but he said that it resembled the language of the Sami people. The Bjarmians told Ohthere about their country and other countries that bordered it.

Later, several expeditions were undertaken from Norway to Bjarmaland. In 920, Eric Bloodaxe made a Viking expedition, as well as Harald II of Norway and Haakon Magnusson of Norway, in 1090.

The best known expedition was that of Tore Hund, who, together with some friends, arrived in Bjarmaland in 1026. They started to trade with the inhabitants and bought a great many pelts, whereupon they pretended to leave. Later, they made shore in secret, and plundered the burial site, where the Bjarmians had erected an idol of their god Jómali. This god had a bowl containing silver on his knees, and a valuable chain around his neck. Tore and his men managed to escape from the pursuing Bjarmians with their rich bounty.

== Identification ==
The name Bjarmaland appears in Old Norse literature, possibly referring to the area where Arkhangelsk is presently situated, and where it was preceded by a Bjarmian settlement. The first appearance of the name occurs in an account of the travels of Ohthere of Hålogaland, which was written in about 890.

The name Permians is already found in the oldest document of the Rus', the Nestor's Chronicle (1000–1100). The names of other Uralic tribes are also listed including some Samoyedic peoples as well as the Veps, Cheremis, Mordvin, and Chudes.

The place-name Bjarmaland was also used later both by the German historian Adam of Bremen (11th century) and the Icelander Snorri Sturluson (1179–1241) in Bósa saga ok Herrauðs, reporting about its rivers flowing out to Gandvik. It is not clear if they reference the same Bjarmaland as was mentioned in the Voyage of Ohthere, however. The name of the Bjarmian god Jómali is so close to the word for "god" in most Finnic languages that Bjarmians were likely a Finnic group. In fact, languages belonging to other language groups have never been suggested within serious research.

The Swedish cartographer Olaus Magnus located Bjarmaland in the Kola Peninsula in his Carta marina et descriptio septentrionalium terrarum (1539), while Swedish humanist Johannes Schefferus (1621–1679) identified it with Lappland.

== Origin of the name ==
Bjarmians cannot be connected directly to any existing group of people living today, but it is likely that they were a separate group of Finnic speakers in the White Sea area. Toponyms and loan words in dialects in northern Russia indicate that Finnic speaking populations used to live in the area. Also Russian chronicles mention groups of people in the area associated with Finno-Ugric languages.

Accordingly, many historians assume the terms beorm and bjarm to derive from the Uralic word perm, which refers to "travelling merchants" and represents the Old Permic culture. Others derive perm from parma ("forested highlands" in the Komi language). However, some linguists consider this theory to be speculative. Alternatively, Ross (1937) suggests that the name is from an Old Norse term for "edge, shore", the bjarmar being the "people from the edge", a name which would then have been taken over by the population and changed to permi. According to Russian linguist Dmitry Bubrikh, the name was loaned into Russian пермь from Finnic perämaa ("hinterland").

Recent research on the Uralic substrate in northern Russian dialects suggests that several other Uralic groups besides the Permians, lived in Bjarmaland, assumed to have included the Viena Karelians, Sami and Kvens. According to Helimski, the language spoken c. 1000 AD in the northern Archangel region, which he terms Lop', was closely related to but distinct from the Sami languages proper. That would fit Ottar's account perfectly.

== Trade and external ties ==
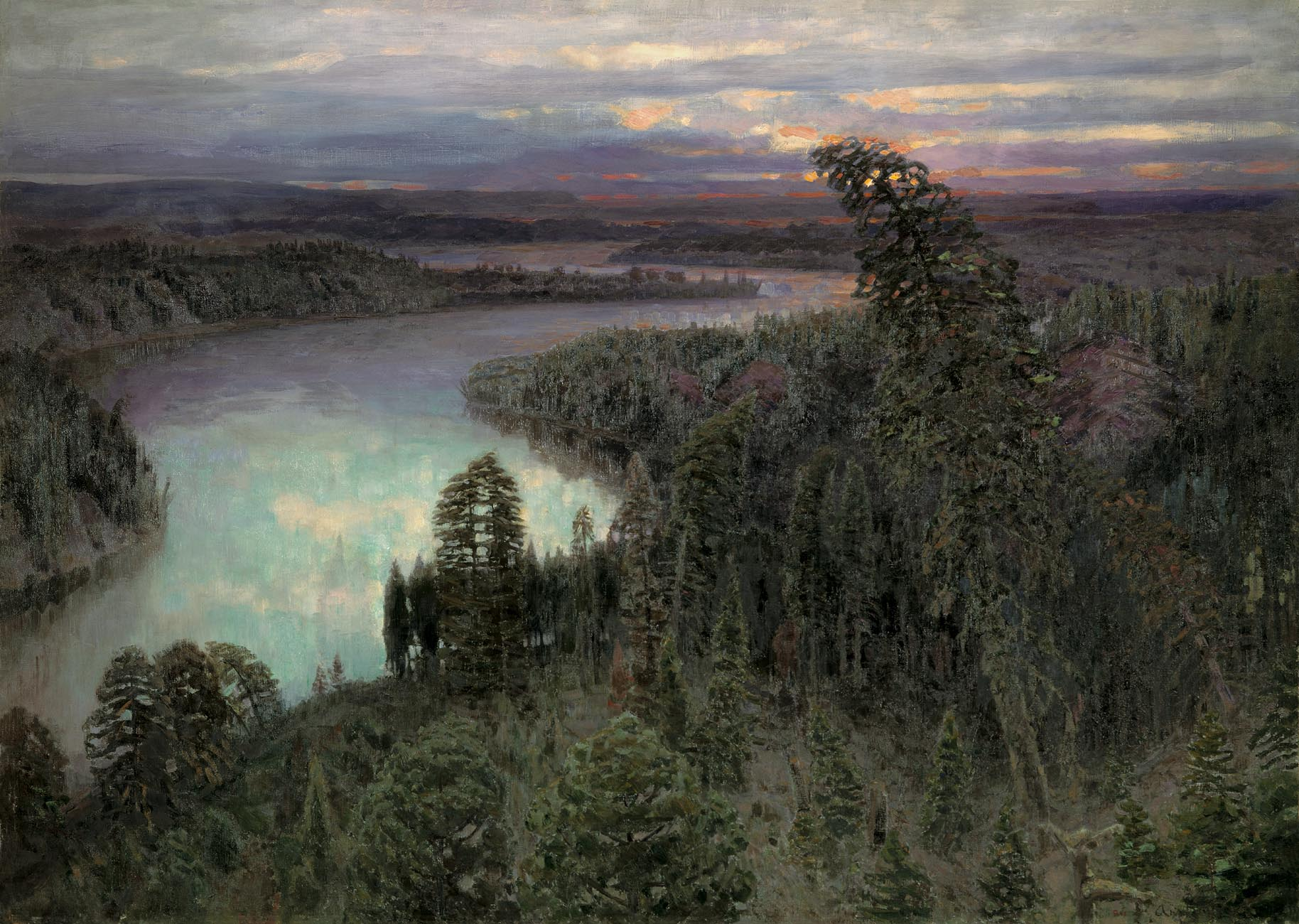
The Northern Land (Apollinary Vasnetsov, 1899).

Modern historians suppose that the wealth of the Bjarmians was due to their profitable trade along the Northern Dvina, the Kama River and the Volga to Bolghar and other trading settlements in the south. Along this route, silver coins and other merchandise were exchanged for pelts and walrus tusks brought by the Bjarmians. In fact, burial sites in modern Perm Krai are the richest source of Sasanian and Sogdian silverware from Iran. Further north, the Bjarmians traded with the Sami.

It seems that the Scandinavians made some use of the Dvina trade route, in addition to the Volga trade route and Dnieper trade route. In 1217, two Norwegian traders arrived in Bjarmaland to buy pelts; one of the traders continued further south to pass to Russia in order to arrive in the Holy Land, where he intended to take part in the Crusades. The second trader who remained was killed by the Bjarmians. This caused Norwegian officials to undertake a campaign of retribution into Bjarmaland which they pillaged in 1222.

Bjarmian trade reached southeast to Bolghar, by the Volga River, where the Bjarmians also interacted with Scandinavians and Fennoscandians, who had ventured southbound from the Baltic Sea area.

The 13th century seems to have seen the decline of the Bjarmians, who became tributaries of the Novgorod Republic. While many Slavs fled the Mongol invasion northward, to Beloozero and Bjarmaland, the displaced Bjarmians sought refuge in Norway, where they were given land around the Malangen fjord by Haakon IV of Norway in 1240. More important for the decline was probably that, with the onset of the Crusades, the trade routes had found a more westerly orientation or shifted considerably to the south.

When the Novgorodians founded Velikiy Ustiug, in the beginning of the 13th century, the Bjarmians had a serious competitor for the trade. More and more Pomors arrived in the area during the 14th and 15th centuries, which led to the final assimilation of the Bjarmians by the Slavs.

== See also ==
- Ohthere of Hålogaland
- Kvenland
- Gardariki
- Miklagard
- Vinland
- Serkland
- Skræling
- Panurus biarmicus and Biarmosuchus tener, species whose scientific names were created after the region
- Kola Norwegians
- Murman Coast
- Viking expansion
