= Serge Zenkovsky =

Russian-American historian (1907–1990)

Serge Aleksandrovich Zenkovsky (Russian: Сергей Александрович Зеньковский; 16 June 1907, Kiev, Russian Empire – 31 March 1990, Florida) was a Russian historian, expatriate in the United States since 1949. He specialized in Economic, Eastern European and Central Asian history.

== Life ==
=== Europe ===
Zenkovsky was born on 16 June 1907 (Gregorian calendar) in Kiev. His father Aleksandr (1878–1966) was a professor of economics, his mother Elena (1884–1954) the daughter of a physician and professor of surgery; he also had a sister, Nadezhda. After the Russian Revolution, the family fled first to Constantinople, then Berlin and Prague, where Zenkovsky graduated in economic history. He then left his family in Prague to move to Paris, where his uncle Vasilii Vasilievich Zenkovsky lived. There, he graduated from the University of Paris in Eastern European and Modern history. He also began to learn English. From 1930 to 1939, he worked in Paris as a business manager.

In 1938, with his immigration papers to the United States already in order, Zenkovsky planned to visit his family in Prague one last time, but was caught up in the German occupation of Czechoslovakia. Unable to leave, he continued his studies at Charles University, earning a PhD in Russian and Modern history. His dissertation, written in German, was on Russian policies in Sinkiang from 1856 to 1914. After escaping from the Prague Offensive, Zenkovsky and his parents wound up in the American zone of occupation in Germany, where he taught at the Polytechnical school of the International Refugee Organization in Munich, until making their way to America in 1949.

=== America ===
Zenkovsky spent a year shrubbing shrimp at Schrafft's in New York City, until he was hired as teacher for various courses on Slavonic subjects at Indiana University. In 1952, he married Betty Jean Bubbers, who was studying for her M.A. in Russian. Two years later, in 1954, he was invited to Harvard University as visiting lecturer for the Russian Research Center, while his wife completed her PhD at Radcliffe College.

With another move to Stetson University (including a post for teacher of Russian for his wife) started a period of steady movement; in 1960 to the University of Colorado, in 1962 back to Stetson University. There, he founded the University's Russian institute, provoking angry reactions from locals who feared possible Communist influence. In 1964, Zenkovsky was awarded a Guggenheim fellowship. In 1967, the Zenkovskys moved to Vanderbilt University, where they stayed until they retired to Florida in 1977. However, they still kept up their scholarly output with a new edition and translation of the Nikon Chronicles. Starting in 1986, Zenkovsky struggled against several illnesses, but continued editing The Nikonian Chronicle together with his wife, completing the final volume in time for the thousandth anniversary of the Christianization of Kievan Rus' in 1988. Zenkovsky died on 31 March 1990.

== Works (selection) ==
At the time of his death, Zenkovsky had published over two hundred articles and books.

- Pan-Turkism & Islam in Russia, Cambridge 1960.
- Medieval Russia's Epics, Chronicles and Tales, New York 1963.
- Russia's Old Believers, Munich 1970.
