= Vym (river) =

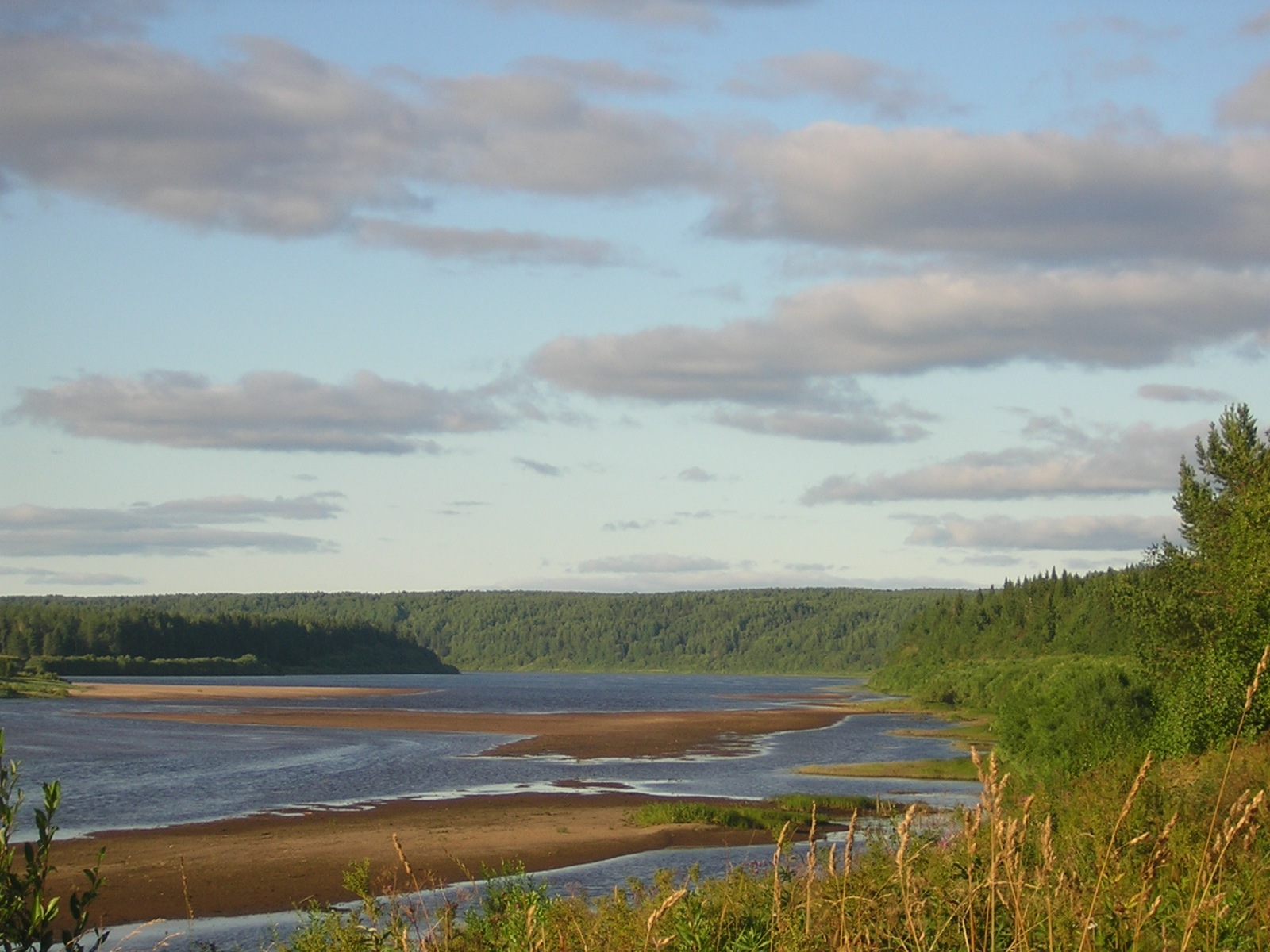
- The Vym 20 kilometres (12 mi) from its mouth

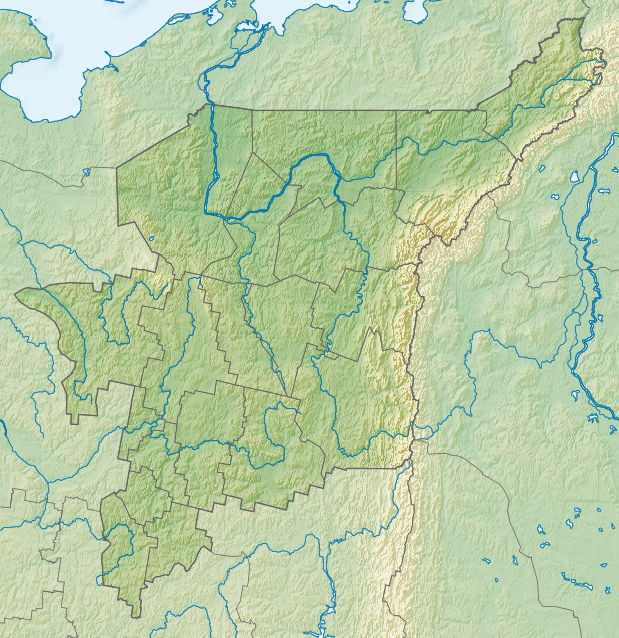
- Russia Komi Republic

Location
- Country: Komi Republic, Russia

Physical characteristics
- Source
  - location: Timan Ridge
- Mouth: Vychegda
  - coordinates: 62°13′00″N 50°23′32″E
- Length: 499 km (310 mi)
- Basin size: 25,600 km^{2} (9,900 mi^{2})

Basin features
- Progression: Vychegda→ Northern Dvina→ White Sea

The Vym (Russian: Вымь; Komi: Емва, romanized: Emva) is a river in the Komi Republic, Russia. It is a tributary of the Vychegda in the basin of the Northern Dvina. It is 499 kilometres (310 mi) long, and its drainage basin covers 25,600 square kilometres (9,900 mi^{2}). Its average discharge is 196 cubic metres per second (6,900 cu ft/s).

The Vym has its sources in the southern foothills of the Timan Ridge. It runs towards the south, through a flat taiga landscape of coniferous forests and bogs. In the upper reaches of the river there are stretches of rapids. It joins the Vychegda at the settlement of Ust-Vym. The river is used for floating of timber and wood products, and it is navigable on its lower reaches.

Its main tributaries are, from the right: Vorykva, Edva, Pozheg and Chub, and from the left: Koin and Veslyana.
