= Vychegda =

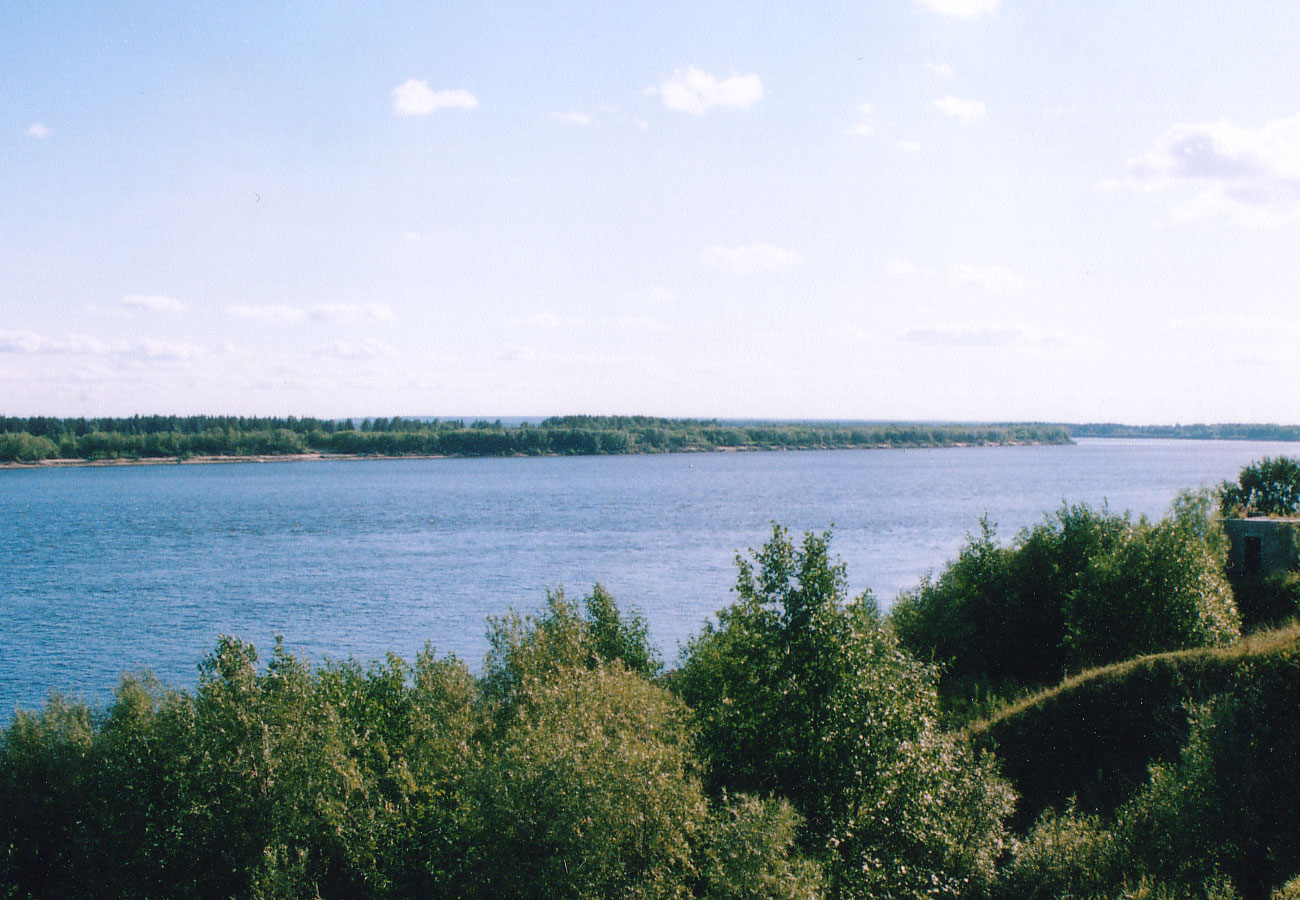
- The lower course of the Vychegda
- Native name: Вычегда (Russian)

Location
- Country: Russia

Physical characteristics
- Mouth: Northern Dvina
  - coordinates: 61.282°N 46.60°E
  - elevation: 41 m (135 ft)
- Length: 1,130 km (700 mi)
- Basin size: 121,000 km^{2} (47,000 sq mi)
- Discharge
  - average: 1,090 m^{3}/s (38,000 cu ft/s)

Basin features
- Progression: Northern Dvina→ White Sea
- Tributaries
  - left: North Keltma, Sysola, Viled
  - right: Vishera, Vym, Yarenga, Berdyshevka

The Northern Dvina River basin

The Vychegda (Russian: Вычегда; Komi: Эжва, romanized: Ežva) is a river in the European part of Russia, a tributary of the Northern Dvina. Its length is about 1,100 kilometres (680 mi). Its source is approximately 310 kilometres (190 mi) west of the northern Ural Mountains. It flows roughly in a western direction, through the Komi Republic and Arkhangelsk Oblast. The largest city along the Vychegda is Syktyvkar, the capital of the Komi Republic. The Viled, the Yarenga, and the Vym are among its main tributaries. The Vychegda flows into the Northern Dvina in Kotlas (Arkhangelsk Oblast).

The river basin of the Vychegda comprises vast areas in Arkhangelsk Oblast and in the Komi Republic, as well as less extended areas in Kirov Oblast and Perm Krai.

About 800 kilometres (500 mi) of the Vychegda is navigable. In 1822 the Vychegda was connected to the river Kama, a tributary of the river Volga, by the Northern Catherine Canal, which, however, has been disused since 1838. In summer, there is regular passenger navigation connecting Kotlas and Soyga (located approximately halfway between Solvychegodsk and Yarensk).

== History ==
The area was originally populated by Finno-Ugric peoples, and was home to Vychegda Perm, which was later colonized by the Novgorod Republic. Novgorod established two trade routes to the Ob River, both starting from the town of Ustyug. The first route went along the Sukhona and Vychegda, then along the Usa to the lower reaches of the Ob.

Solvychegodsk was founded in the 14th century, Yarensk has been known since 1374. The area was attractive primarily because of the fur trade. From the Northern Dvina, the merchants went to the Vychegda, and further they could get directly to the river basin of the Pechora either via the Cherya and the Izhma, or via the Mylva.

== Name ==
The Russian name – Vychegda – is believed to come from an ancient Ob-Ugric name with the meaning "meadow river" (reconstructed as *vič-oxt, compare Mansi wānsi "grass" and āxt "stream"). Komi Ežva is a calque from this name: eža "meadow" and va "water, river".

== Sources ==
- Naumov, Igor V. (22 November 2006). The History of Siberia. Routledge. ISBN 978-1-134-20703-9.
