= Badia =

Badia may refer to:

== Places ==
- Badia (region) or Syrian Desert, semiarid and arid region in eastern Syria and Jordan
- Badia, Bangladesh, a village in Chandpur District
- Val Badia, a valley in South Tyrol, Italy
- Badia, South Tyrol, a municipality in South Tyrol
- Badia, Castiglione del Lago, a frazione of Castiglione del Lago, Perugia, Italy
- Badia, Mali, a commune in the Cercle of Kita

== People ==
- Badia (surname)
- Badia Masabni (1892–1974), Syrian belly dancer, singer, actress, night club owner and businesswoman considered the developer of modern belly dancing
- Badia Skalli (born 1944), Moroccan politician
- Enrique Badía Romero (1930–2024), Spanish comics artist

== Other uses ==
- Badia Spices, an American manufacturer of spices and herbs
- Badia (spider), a genus of spiders in the family Palpimanidae

== See also ==
- Italy:
  - Badia a Coltibuono, an abbey in Tuscany
  - Badia a Elmi, a village in the province of Siena
  - Badia Calavena, a municipality in the province of Verona
  - Badia di Passignano, an historic Benedictine abbey near Florence
  - Badia Fiorentina, an abbey and church in Florence
  - Badia Pavese, a municipality in the province of Pavia
  - Badia Polesine, a municipality in the province of Rovigo
  - Badia Tedalda, a municipality in the province of Arezzo
- Spain:
  - Badia del Vallès, a municipality
- Badiya, an upcoming video game
- Princess Badiya bint Hassan (born 1974), Jordanian princess
- Badya, a Russian river
- Abbadia (disambiguation)
- Abbadie (disambiguation)
