= Churtan =

Churtan Чуртан
- Settlement
- Location within Perm Krai Location within Russia
- Coordinates: 60°10′N 53°52′E
- Country: Russia
- Region: Perm Krai
- District: Gaynsky District
- Time zone: UTC+5:00

Churtan (Russian: Чуртан) is a rural locality (a settlement) in Seyvinskoye Rural Settlement, Gaynsky District, Perm Krai, Russia. The population was 195 as of 2010. There are 4 streets.

== Geography ==
Churtan is located 46 km southwest of Gayny (the district's administrative centre) by road. Seyva is the nearest rural locality.
