= Shordyn =

Shordyn Шордын
- Settlement
- Location within Perm Krai Location within Russia
- Coordinates: 60°23′N 54°16′E
- Country: Russia
- Region: Perm Krai
- District: Gaynsky District
- Time zone: UTC+5:00

Shordyn (Russian: Шордын) is a rural locality (a settlement) in Kebratskoye Rural Settlement, Gaynsky District, Perm Krai, Russia. The population was 97 as of 2010. There are 3 streets.

== Geography ==
Shordyn is located 22 km north of Gayny (the district's administrative centre) by road. Kebraty is the nearest rural locality.
