= Tiunovo =

Tiunovo Тиуново
- Village
- Location within Perm Krai Location within Russia
- Coordinates: 60°13′N 54°10′E
- Country: Russia
- Region: Perm Krai
- District: Gaynsky District
- Time zone: UTC+5:00

Tuinovo (Russian: Тиуново) is a rural locality (a village) in Gaynskoye Rural Settlement, Gaynsky District, Perm Krai, Russia. The population was 22 as of 2010. There is 1 street.

== Geography ==
Tiunovo is located 31 km southwest of Gayny (the district's administrative centre) by road. Shipitsyno is the nearest rural locality.
