= Nikonovo =

Nikonovo Никоново
- Village
- Location within Perm Krai Location within Russia
- Coordinates: 60°03′N 54°26′E
- Country: Russia
- Region: Perm Krai
- District: Gaynsky District
- Time zone: UTC+5:00

Nikonovo (Russian: Никоново) is a rural locality (a village) in Ivanchinskoye Rural Settlement, Gaynsky District, Perm Krai, Russia. The population was 10 as of 2010.

== Geography ==
Nikonovo is located 45 km south of Gayny (the district's administrative centre) by road. Imasy is the nearest rural locality.
