= Sosnovaya =

Sosnovaya Сосновая
- Settlement
- Location within Perm Krai Location within Russia
- Coordinates: 60°21′N 53°50′E
- Country: Russia
- Region: Perm Krai
- District: Gaynsky District
- Time zone: UTC+5:00

Sosnovaya (Russian: Сосновая) is a rural locality (a settlement) in Gaynskoye Rural Settlement, Gaynsky District, Perm Krai, Russia. The population was 209 as of 2010. There are 4 streets.

== Geography ==
Sosnovaya is located 33 km northwest of Gayny (the district's administrative centre) by road. Ust-Veslyana is the nearest rural locality. It is located approximately 10km Northwest from the Kama River.
