= Imasy =

Imasy Имасы
- Village
- Location within Perm Krai Location within Russia
- Coordinates: 60°03′N 54°27′E
- Country: Russia
- Region: Perm Krai
- District: Gaynsky District
- Time zone: UTC+5:00

Imasy (Russian: Имасы) is a rural locality (a village) in Ivanchinskoye Rural Settlement, Gaynsky District, Perm Krai, Russia. The population was 143 as of 2010.

== Geography ==
Imasy is located 43 km south of Gayny (the district's administrative centre) by road. Nikonovo is the nearest rural locality.
