= Chazhegovo =

Chazhegovo Чажегово
- Village
- Location within Perm Krai Location within Russia
- Coordinates: 60°10′N 54°23′E
- Country: Russia
- Region: Perm Krai
- District: Gaynsky District
- Time zone: UTC+5:00

Chazhegovo (Russian: Чажегово) is a rural locality (a village) in Gaynskoye Rural Settlement, Gaynsky District, Perm Krai, Russia. The population was 63 as of 2010. There is 1 street.

== Geography ==
Chazhegovo is located 16 km south of Gayny (the district's administrative centre) by road. Vaskino is the nearest rural locality.
