= Shipitsino =

Shipitsino (Russian: Шипицино) is the name of several rural localities in Russia:

- Shipitsino, Gaynsky District, Perm Krai, a village in Gaynsky District, Perm Krai
- Shipitsino, Kochyovsky District, Perm Krai, a village in Kochyovsky District, Perm Krai
