= Verkhnyaya Staritsa =

Verkhnyaya Staritsa Верхняя Старица
- Settlement
- Location within Perm Krai Location within Russia
- Coordinates: 60°13′N 54°39′E
- Country: Russia
- Region: Perm Krai
- District: Gaynsky District
- Time zone: UTC+5:00

Verkhnyaya Staritsa (Russian: Верхняя Старица) is a rural locality (a settlement) and the administrative center of Verkhnestaritskoye Rural Settlement, Gaynsky District, Perm Krai, Russia. The population was 822 as of 2010. There are 13 streets.

== Geography ==
Verkhnyaya Staritsa is located 26 km southeast of Gayny (the district's administrative centre) by road. Kasimovka is the nearest rural locality.
