= Keros, Perm Krai =

Keros Керос
- Settlement
- Location within Perm Krai Location within Russia
- Coordinates: 60°46′N 54°51′E
- Country: Russia
- Region: Perm Krai
- District: Gaynsky District
- Time zone: UTC+5:00

Keros (Russian: Керос) is a rural locality (a settlement) in Ust-Chernovskoye Rural Settlement, Gaynsky District, Perm Krai, Russia. The population was 568 as of 2010. There are 15 streets.

== Geography ==
Keros is located 146 km northwest of Gayny (the district's administrative centre) by road. Badya is the nearest rural locality.
