= Isayevo, Perm Krai =

Isayevo Исаево
- Village
- Location within Perm Krai Location within Russia
- Coordinates: 60°12′N 54°32′E
- Country: Russia
- Region: Perm Krai
- District: Gaynsky District
- Time zone: UTC+5:00

Isayevo (Russian: Исаево) is a rural locality (a village) in Gaynskoye Rural Settlement, Gaynsky District, Perm Krai, Russia. The population was 7 as of 2010.

== Geography ==
Isayevo is located 16 km southeast of Gayny (the district's administrative centre) by road. Ankudinovo is the nearest rural locality.
