= Lunym =

Lunym Луным
- Settlement
- Location within Perm Krai Location within Russia
- Coordinates: 60°24′N 54°41′E
- Country: Russia
- Region: Perm Krai
- District: Gaynsky District
- Time zone: UTC+5:00

Lunym (Russian: Луным) is a rural locality (a settlement) in Verkhnestaritskoye Rural Settlement, Gaynsky District, Perm Krai, Russia. The population was 151 as of 2010. There are 6 streets.

== Geography ==
Lunym is located 46 km northeast of Gayny (the district's administrative centre) by road. Verkhnyaya Staritsa is the nearest rural locality.
