= Pugvin Mys =

Pugvin Mys Пугвин Мыс
- Settlement
- Location within Perm Krai Location within Russia
- Coordinates: 60°13′N 53°46′E
- Country: Russia
- Region: Perm Krai
- District: Gaynsky District
- Time zone: UTC+5:00

Pugvin Mys (Russian: Пугвин Мыс) is a rural locality (a settlement) in Seyvinskoye Rural Settlement, Gaynsky District, Perm Krai, Russia. The population was 64 as of 2010. There is 1 street.

== Geography ==
Pugvin Mys is located 44 km southwest of Gayny (the district's administrative centre) by road. Seyva is the nearest rural locality.
