= Krasnoyary =

Krasnoyary Краснояры
- Village
- Location within Perm Krai Location within Russia
- Coordinates: 60°04′N 54°03′E
- Country: Russia
- Region: Perm Krai
- District: Gaynsky District
- Time zone: UTC+5:00

Krasnoyary (Russian: Краснояры) is a rural locality (a village) in Ivanchinskoye Rural Settlement, Gaynsky District, Perm Krai, Russia. The population was 4 as of 2010.

== Geography ==
Krasnoyary is located 43 km southwest of Gayny (the district's administrative centre) by road. Krasny Yar is the nearest rural locality.
