= Danilovo, Perm Krai =

Danilovo Данилово
- Village
- Location within Perm Krai Location within Russia
- Coordinates: 60°15′N 54°20′E
- Country: Russia
- Region: Perm Krai
- District: Gaynsky District
- Time zone: UTC+5:00

Danilovo (Russian: Данилово) is a rural locality (a village) in Gaynskoye Rural Settlement, Gaynsky District, Perm Krai, Russia. The population was 222 as of 2010. There are 4 streets.

== Geography ==
Danilovo is located 6 km south of Gayny (the district's administrative centre) by road. Modorobo is the nearest rural locality.
