= Seyva =

Seyva Сёйва
- Settlement
- Location within Perm Krai Location within Russia
- Coordinates: 60°10′N 53°45′E
- Country: Russia
- Region: Perm Krai
- District: Gaynsky District
- Time zone: UTC+5:00

Seyva (Russian: Сёйва) is a rural locality (a settlement) and the administrative center of Seyvinskoye Rural Settlement, Gaynsky District, Perm Krai, Russia. The population was 677 as of 2010. There are 6 streets.

== Geography ==
Seyva is located 46 km southwest of Gayny (the district's administrative centre) by road. Pugvin Mys is the nearest rural locality.
