= Abbadia (surname) =

Abbadia is an Italian surname. The Italian word, as Badia means "abbey". Notable people with the surname include:

- Luigia Abbadia (1821–1896), Italian opera singer
- Natale Abbadia (1792–1861), Italian composer

== See also ==
- Badia (disambiguation)
- Abbadie, French surname
- Abbadia (disambiguation)
