= Yelevo =

Yelevo Елево
- Village
- Location within Perm Krai Location within Russia
- Coordinates: 60°13′N 54°22′E
- Country: Russia
- Region: Perm Krai
- District: Gaynsky District
- Time zone: UTC+5:00

Yelevo (Russian: Елево) is a rural locality (a village) in Gaynskoye Rural Settlement, Gaynsky District, Perm Krai, Russia. The population was 51 as of 2010. There are 4 streets.

== Geography ==
Yelevo is located 11 km south of Gayny (the district's administrative centre) by road. Modorobo is the nearest rural locality.
