= Parok =

River in Perm Krai, Russia

Physical characteristics
- Mouth: Parmanka
  - coordinates: 60°32′11″N 52°15′08″E
- Length: 17 km (11 mi)

Basin features
- Progression: Parmanka→ Chyornaya→ Veslyana→ Kama→ Volga→ Caspian Sea

The Parok (Russian: Парок) is a river in Perm Krai and Komi Republic, Russia, a right tributary of the Parmanka, which in turn is a tributary of the Chyornaya. The river is 17 kilometres (11 mi) long.
