= Modorobo =

Modorobo Модоробо
- Village
- Location within Perm Krai Location within Russia
- Coordinates: 60°14′N 54°22′E
- Country: Russia
- Region: Perm Krai
- District: Gaynsky District
- Time zone: UTC+5:00

Modorobo (Russian: Модоробо) is a rural locality (a village) in Gaynskoye Rural Settlement, Gaynsky District, Perm Krai, Russia. The population was 6 as of 2010.

== Geography ==
Modorobo is located 9 km south of Gayny (the district's administrative centre) by road. Danilovo is the nearest rural locality.
