= Ankudinovo =

Ankudinovo Анкудиново
- Village
- Location within Perm Krai Location within Russia
- Coordinates: 60°12′N 54°34′E
- Country: Russia
- Region: Perm Krai
- District: Gaynsky District
- Time zone: UTC+5:00

Ankudinovo (Russian: Анкудиново) is a rural locality (a village) in Gaynskoye Rural Settlement, Gaynsky District, Perm Krai, Russia. The population was 4 as of 2010. There is 1 street.

== Geography ==
Ankudinovo is located 17 km southeast of Gayny (the district's administrative centre) by road. Isayevo is the nearest rural locality.
