= Peles (river) =

River in Perm Krai, Russia

Physical characteristics
- Mouth: Chyornaya
  - coordinates: 60°43′17″N 51°54′19″E
- Length: 27 km (17 mi)

Basin features
- Progression: Chyornaya→ Veslyana→ Kama→ Volga→ Caspian Sea

The Peles (Russian: Пелес) is a river in Perm Krai, Russia, a right tributary of the Chyornaya, which in turn is a tributary of the Veslyana. The river is 27 kilometres (17 mi) long. The source of the river is in the extreme west of the Gaynsky District of Perm Krai near its border with the Komi Republic, 10 kilometres (6 mi) southwest of the settlement of Peles, about 219 metres (719 ft) above sea level. Its mouth is about 8 kilometres (5 mi) west of the settlement of Chernorechensky, 171 metres (561 ft) above sea level.
