= Bazuyevo =

Bazuyevo Базуево
- Village
- Location within Perm Krai Location within Russia
- Coordinates: 60°12′N 54°11′E
- Country: Russia
- Region: Perm Krai
- District: Gaynsky District
- Time zone: UTC+5:00

Bazuyevo (Russian: Базуево) is a rural locality (a village) in Gaynskoye Rural Settlement, Gaynsky District, Perm Krai, Russia. The population was 26 as of 2010. There is 1 street.

== Geography ==
Bazuyevo is located 33 km southwest of Gayny (the district's administrative centre) by road. Tiunovo is the nearest rural locality.
