= Kasimovka =

Kasimovka Касимовка
- Settlement
- Location within Perm Krai Location within Russia
- Coordinates: 60°12′N 54°40′E
- Country: Russia
- Region: Perm Krai
- District: Gaynsky District
- Time zone: UTC+5:00

Kasimovka (Russian: Касимовка) is a rural locality (a settlement) in Verkhnestaritskoye Rural Settlement, Gaynsky District, Perm Krai, Russia. The population was 428 as of 2010. There are 11 streets.

== Geography ==
Kasimovka is located 24 km southeast of Gayny (the district's administrative centre) by road. Verkhnyaya Staritsa is the nearest rural locality.
