= Ust-Chukurya =

Ust-Chukurya Усть-Чукурья
- Village
- Location within Perm Krai Location within Russia
- Coordinates: 60°17′N 53°58′E
- Country: Russia
- Region: Perm Krai
- District: Gaynsky District
- Time zone: UTC+5:00

Ust-Chukurya (Russian: Усть-Чукурья) is a rural locality (a village) in Gaynskoye Rural Settlement, Gaynsky District, Perm Krai, Russia. The population was 4 as of 2010.

== Geography ==
Ust-Chukurya is located 27 km west of Gayny (the district's administrative centre) by road. Ust-Veslyana is the nearest rural locality.
