= Onyl =

Onyl Оныл
- Settlement
- Location within Perm Krai Location within Russia
- Coordinates: 60°24′N 53°39′E
- Country: Russia
- Region: Perm Krai
- District: Gaynsky District
- Time zone: UTC+5:00

Onyl (Russian: Оныл) is a rural locality (a settlement) in Serebryanskoye Rural Settlement, Gaynsky District, Perm Krai, Russia. The population was 417 as of 2010. There are 9 streets.

== Geography ==
Onyl is located 46 km northwest of Gayny (the district's administrative centre) by road. Sosnovaya is the nearest rural locality.
