= Ust-Veslyana =

Ust-Veslyana Усть-Весляна
- Settlement
- Location within Perm Krai Location within Russia
- Coordinates: 60°19′N 53°59′E
- Country: Russia
- Region: Perm Krai
- District: Gaynsky District
- Time zone: UTC+5:00

Ust-Veslyana (Russian: Усть-Весляна) is a rural locality (a settlement) in Gaynskoye Rural Settlement, Gaynsky District, Perm Krai, Russia. The population was 183 as of 2010. There are 6 streets.

== Geography ==
Ust-Veslyana is located 24 km west of Gayny (the district's administrative centre) by road. Ust-Chukurya is the nearest rural locality.
