= Gayny =

Gayny (Russian: Гайны) is the name of several rural localities in Russia:

- Gayny, Perm Krai, a settlement in Gaynsky District of Perm Krai
- Gayny, Sverdlovsk Oblast, a village in Achitsky District of Sverdlovsk Oblast
