= Verkhny Budym =

Verkhny Budym Верхний Будым
- Settlement
- Location within Perm Krai Location within Russia
- Coordinates: 60°33′N 54°10′E
- Country: Russia
- Region: Perm Krai
- District: Gaynsky District
- Time zone: UTC+5:00

Verkhny Budym (Russian: Верхний Будым) is a rural locality (a settlement) in Kebratskoye Rural Settlement, Gaynsky District, Perm Krai, Russia. The population was 257 as of 2010. There are 7 streets.

== Geography ==
Verkhny Budym is located 40 km north of Gayny (the district's administrative centre) by road. Zhemchuzhny is the nearest rural locality.
