= Filosseno Luzzatto =

Italian Jewish scholar

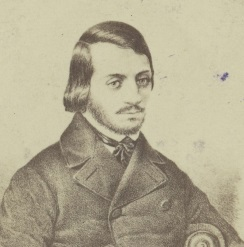
- Born: 10 July 1829; Trieste
- Died: 25 January 1854 (aged 24); Padua

Academic work
- Discipline: Philology, Linguistics, Orientalism
- Main interests: Semitic languages and Sanskrit
- Notable works: "Mémoires des Antiquités de France"

Filosseno Luzzatto (Philoxene) (10 July 1829 at Trieste – 25 January 1854 at Padua) was an Italian Jewish scholar; son of Samuel David Luzzatto. His name is the Italian equivalent of the title of one of his father's principal works, "Oheb Ger," which was written at the time of Filosseno's birth.

He showed from childhood linguistic aptitude, and having mastered several European languages, he devoted himself to the study of Semitic languages and Sanskrit. When a boy of thirteen he deciphered some old inscriptions on the tombstones of Padua which had puzzled older scholars.

Two years later, happening to read D'Abbadie's narrative of his travels in Abyssinia, he resolved to write a history of the Falashas.

In spite of his premature death, he wrote several important works:

- "L'Asia Antica, Occidentale e Media" (Milan, 1847); "Mémoire sur l'Inscription Cunéïforme Persane de Behistan," in "Journal de l'Institut Lombard" (ib. 1848)
- "Le Sanscritisme de la Langue Assyrienne" (Padua, 1849)
- "Etudes sur les Inscriptions Assyriennes de Persépolis, Hamadan, Van, et Khorsabad" (ib. 1850)
- "Notice sur Abou Jousouf Hasdai ibn Shaprout" (ib. 1852)
- "Mémoire sur les Juifs d'Abyssinie ou Falashas" (printed posthumously in "Arch. Isr." xii.-xv.).

He also translated into Italian eighteen chapters of the Book of Ezekiel, adding a Hebrew commentary. Luzzatto contributed to many periodicals, mostly on philological or exegetical subjects. Of special interest are his observations on the inscriptions in the ruins of the ancient Jewish cemetery in Paris ("Mémoires des Antiquités de France," xxii. 60).
