= Ust-Chyornaya =

Ust-Chyornaya Усть-Чёрная
- Settlement
- Location within Perm Krai Location within Russia
- Coordinates: 60°28′N 52°39′E
- Country: Russia
- Region: Perm Krai
- District: Gaynsky District
- Time zone: UTC+5:00

Ust-Chyornaya (Russian: Усть-Чёрная) is a rural locality (a settlement) in Gaynsky District, Perm Krai, Russia. The population was 1,078 as of 2010. There are 14 streets.

== Geography ==
Ust-Chyornaya is located 109 km west of Gayny (the district's administrative centre) by road. Serebryanka is the nearest rural locality.
