= Utva (disambiguation) =

Utva may refer to:

- Utva Aviation Industry, a Serbian aircraft manufacturer
- Utva (Perm Krai), a river in Perm Krai, Russia
- Utva (Ural), a river in Kazakhstan
