= Tyla (disambiguation) =

Tyla (born 2002) is a South African singer.

Tyla may also refer to:

== People ==
=== Music ===
- Tyla (album), a 2024 album by the South African singer Tyla
- Tyla Tour, 2024 concert tour by the South African singer Tyla
- Sean Tyla (1946–2020), English musician
- Tyla J. Pallas (born 1960), English rock musician and singer in the Dogs D'Amour
- Tyla Yaweh, (born 1995), American rapper and singer

=== Sports ===
- Tyla Flexman (born 1986), Canadian field hockey player
- Tyla Hanks (born 2000), Australian Australian rules football player
- Tyla Hepi (born 1993), New Zealand rugby player
- Tyla Nathan-Wong (born 1994), New Zealand rugby player
- Tyla Rattray (born 1985), South African motocross racer
- Tyla-Jay Vlajnic (born 1990), Australian-born Serbian football player

== Places ==
- Tyla, Perm Krai, Russia

== Other ==
- Tyla, a minor character in Bratz
