= Lel (river) =

River in Perm Krai, Russia

Physical characteristics
- Mouth: Chyornaya
  - coordinates: 60°40′14″N 52°09′58″E
- Length: 20 km (12 mi)

Basin features
- Progression: Chyornaya→ Veslyana→ Kama→ Volga→ Caspian Sea

The Lel (Russian: Лель) is a river in Perm Krai, Russia, a right tributary of the Chyornaya, which in turn is a tributary of the Veslyana. The river is 20 kilometres (12 mi) long.

The source of the river is located near the border with Komi Republic, 6 kilometres (4 mi) south of the settlement of Peles, 199 metres (653 ft) above sea level. The river mouth is 159 metres (522 ft) above sea level.
