= Travyanka =

River in Perm Krai, Russia

Physical characteristics
- Mouth: Veslyana
  - coordinates: 60.857°N 52.8762°E
- Length: 48 km (30 mi)

Basin features
- Progression: Veslyana→ Kama→ Volga→ Caspian Sea

The Travyanka (Russian: Травянка) is a river in Perm Krai, Russia, a left tributary of the Veslyana, which in turn is a tributary of the Kama. The river is 48 kilometres (30 mi) long. Its source is near the border with the Komi Republic; it flows through the northwestern portion of the Gaynsky District of the krai.
