= Unearthed =

Unearthed may refer to:

== Film and television ==
- Unearthed (film), a 2006 horror film
- "Unearthed" (Fringe), a 2010 television episode
- "Unearthed" (Prison Break), a 2006 television episode

== Music ==
- Unearthed (Johnny Cash album), a posthumous Johnny Cash album
- Unearthed (Crimson Thorn album), a 1997 album by unblack metal band Crimson Thorn
- Unearthed (Nic Jones album), 2001
- Unearthed (E.S. Posthumus album), an E.S. Posthumus album

== Other entertainment ==
- Unearthed, an emerging artists music initiative and radio station run by Australian radio network Triple J
- Unearthed: Trail of Ibn Battuta, an action-adventure video game developed in Saudi Arabia

== Organizations ==
- Unearthed Films, a U.S. film distribution company
- Unearthed (publication), an investigations unit set up by Greenpeace UK in 2012

== See also ==
- Inearthed, former name of Finnish melodic death metal band Children of Bodom
- Unearth, American metalcore band
