= Abbadia =

Abbadia may refer to:

- Abbadia (surname), an Italian surname
- Abbadia, Montepulciano, a frazione of Montepulciano, Province of Siena, Tuscany
- Abbadia, Siena, a frazione of Siena, Province of Siena, Tuscany
- Abbadia a Isola, a frazione of Monteriggioni, Province of Siena, Tuscany
- Abbadia Alpina, a frazione of Pinerolo, Province of Turin, Piedmont
- Abbadia Cerreto, a municipality in the Province of Lodi, Lombardy
- Abbadia Lariana, a municipality in the Province of Lecco, Lombardy
- Abbadia San Salvatore, a municipality in the Province of Siena, Tuscany

== See also ==
- Abbadie (disambiguation)
- Badia (disambiguation)
