= Malaya Sol =

River in Perm Krai, Russia

Physical characteristics
- Mouth
  - location: Chyornaya
- Length: 19 km (12 mi)

Basin features
- Progression: Chyornaya→ Veslyana→ Kama→ Volga→ Caspian Sea

The Malaya Sol (Russian: Малая Соль) is a river in Perm Krai, Russia, a left tributary of the Chyornaya, which in turn is a tributary of the Veslyana. The Malaya Sol is 19 kilometres (12 mi) long.

The source of the river is near the border with the Komi Republic, 195 metres (640 ft) above sea level. Its mouth is located in the settlement of Chernorechensky, 163 metres (535 ft) above sea level.
