= Tyla, Perm Krai =

Tyla Тыла
- Village
- Location within Perm Krai Location within Russia
- Coordinates: 60°09′N 54°25′E
- Country: Russia
- Region: Perm Krai
- District: Gaynsky District
- Time zone: UTC+5:00

Tyla (Russian: Тыла) is a rural locality (a village) in Gaynskoye Rural Settlement, Gaynsky District, Perm Krai, Russia. The population was 11 as of 2010. There is 1 street.

== Geography ==
Tyla is located 19 km south of Gayny (the district's administrative centre) by road. Vaskino is the nearest rural locality.
