= Tuykos =

River in Perm Krai, Russia

Physical characteristics
- Mouth
  - location: Ruch
- Length: 11 km (6.8 mi)

Basin features
- Progression: Ruch→ Veslyana→ Kama→ Volga→ Caspian Sea

The Tuykos (Russian: Туйкос) is a river in Perm Krai, Russia, a right tributary of the Ruch, which in turn is a tributary of the Veslyana. The river is 11 kilometres (7 mi) long.
