= Shipitsino, Gaynsky District, Perm Krai =

Shipitsino Шипицыно
- Village
- Location within Perm Krai Location within Russia
- Coordinates: 60°13′N 54°12′E
- Country: Russia
- Region: Perm Krai
- District: Gaynsky District
- Time zone: UTC+5:00

Shipitsino (Russian: Шипицыно) is a rural locality (a village) in Gaynskoye Rural Settlement, Gaynsky District, Perm Krai, Russia. The population was 15 as of 2010. There is 1 street.

== Geography ==
Shipitsino is located 33 km southwest of Gayny (the district's administrative centre) by road. Tiunovo is the nearest rural locality.
