= Sol (river) =

River in Russia

Physical characteristics
- Mouth
  - location: Chyornaya
- Length: 23 km (14 mi)

Basin features
- Progression: Chyornaya→ Veslyana→ Kama→ Volga→ Caspian Sea

The Sol (Russian: Соль) is a river in Perm Krai and Komi Republic, Russia, a left tributary of the Chyornaya, which in turn is a tributary of the Veslyana. The river is 23 kilometres (14 mi) long. The source of the river is in the northeastern portion of the Koygorodsky District of the Komi Republic, 199 metres (653 ft) above sea level. Its mouth is west of the settlement of Chernorechensky, 164 metres (538 ft) above sea level.
