= Chugrum =

River in Perm Krai, Russia

Physical characteristics
- Mouth: Utva
  - coordinates: 60°20′22″N 52°57′36″E
- Length: 21 km (13 mi)

Basin features
- Progression: Utva→ Veslyana→ Kama→ Volga→ Caspian Sea

The Chugrum (Russian: Чугрум) is a river in Perm Krai, Russia. It is a right tributary of the Utva, which is itself a tributary of the Veslyana. The Chugrum is about 21 kilometres (13 mi) long.
