= Chuklya =

River in Russia

Physical characteristics
- Mouth
  - location: Ruch (river)
  - coordinates: 60°43′09″N 53°00′08″E
- Length: 18 km (11 mi)

Basin features
- Progression: Ruch→ Veslyana→ Kama→ Volga→ Caspian Sea

The Chuklya (Russian: Чукля) is a river in Perm Krai, Russia, a left tributary of the Ruch, which in turn is a tributary of the Veslyana. The river is 18 kilometres (11 mi) long. The main tributary is the Ydzhydvozh, which enters from the right.
