= Parmanka =

River in Perm Krai, Russia

Physical characteristics
- Mouth: Chyornaya
  - coordinates: 60.5417°N 52.3735°E
- Length: 39 km (24 mi)

Basin features
- Progression: Chyornaya→ Veslyana→ Kama→ Volga→ Caspian Sea

The Parmanka (Russian: Парманка) is a river in Perm Krai and Komi Republic, Russia, a right tributary of the Chyornaya, which in turn is a tributary of the Veslyana. The river is 39 kilometres (24 mi) long. The river begins in the eastern portion of the Koygorodsky District of the Komi Republic, north of rural locality of Kazhimka, 179 metres (587 ft) above sea level. Its mouth is 145 metres (476 ft) above sea level. The main tributary is the Parok (right).
