= Yuzhnaya Anva =

River in Perm Krai, Russia

Coordinates: 60.2994°N 52.4444°E

Physical characteristics
- Mouth: Utva
- Length: 18 km (11 mi)

Basin features
- Progression: Utva→ Veslyana→ Kama→ Volga→ Caspian Sea

The Yuzhnaya Anva (Russian: Южная Аньва) is a river in Perm Krai, Russia, a left tributary of the Utva, which in turn is a tributary of the Veslyana. The river is 18 kilometres (11 mi) long. The main tributary is the Severnaya Anva (left).
