= Dzhurich =

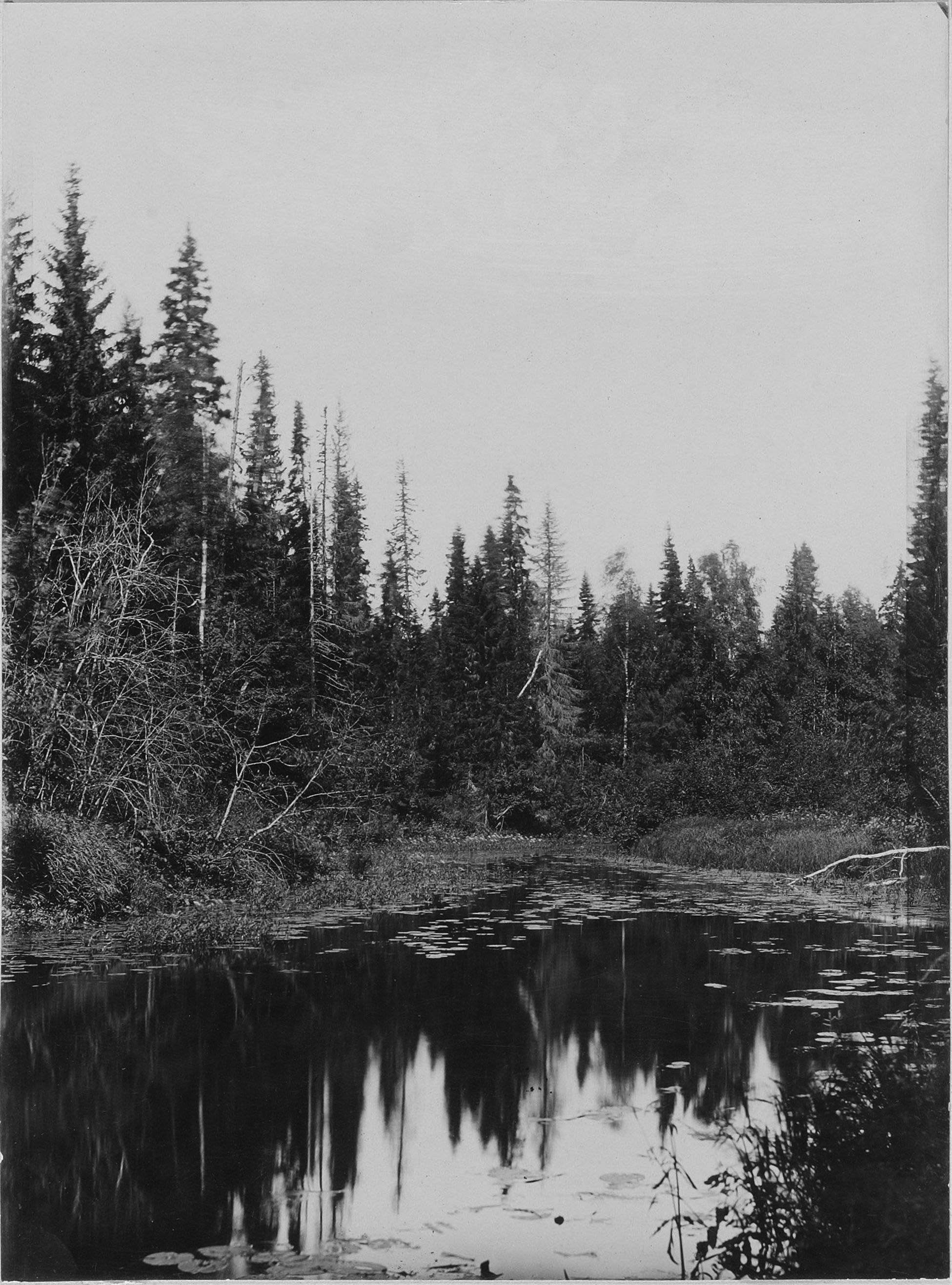

Location
- Country: Russia

Physical characteristics
- Source
  - location: Cherdynsky District
- Mouth: South Keltma
  - coordinates: 60.8675°N 55.2969°E
- Length: 64 km (40 mi)
- Basin size: 358 km^{2} (138 sq mi)

Basin features
- Progression: South Keltma→ Kama→ Volga→ Caspian Sea

The Dzhurich (Russian: Джурич) is a river in Perm Krai, Russia, a left tributary of the South Keltma. It is 64 kilometres (40 mi) long with a drainage basin of 358 square kilometres (138 mi^{2}). It starts in the extreme north of Perm Krai, in Cherdynsky District, near the border with the Komi Republic. Many swamps are along the river, which has some small tributaries. It was connected by the Northern Catherine Canal with the North Keltma, but the canal functioned for only 16 years. The canal is 20 kilometres (12 mi) long.
