= Bolshoy Kub =

River in Perm Krai, Russia

Physical characteristics
- Mouth: Veslyana
  - coordinates: 60.5146°N 52.7051°E
- Length: 37 km (23 mi)

Basin features
- Progression: Veslyana→ Kama→ Volga→ Caspian Sea

The Bolshoy Kub (Russian: Большой Куб) is a river in Perm Krai, Russia, a left tributary of the Veslyana, which in turn is a tributary of the Kama. The river is 37 kilometres (23 mi) long. The Bolshoy Kub flows into the Veslyana 121 kilometres (75 mi) from the larger river's mouth.
