= Dozovka =

River in Perm Krai, Russia

Physical characteristics
- Mouth: Veslyana
  - coordinates: 60.3456°N 53.7424°E
- Length: 55 km (34 mi)
- Basin size: 449 km^{2} (173 sq mi)

Basin features
- Progression: Veslyana→ Kama→ Volga→ Caspian Sea

The Dozovka (Russian: Дозовка) is a river in Perm Krai, Russia, a left tributary of the Veslyana, which in turn is a tributary of the Kama. The river is 55 kilometres (34 mi) long, and the area of its drainage basin is 449 square kilometres (173 mi^{2}). The Dozovka River flows into Veslyana 47 kilometres (29 mi) from its mouth. The main tributary is the Tsibin (left).
