= Northern Catherine Canal =

Coordinates: 61°03′N 55°06′E

Northern Ekaterininsky Canal (Russian: Cеверо-Екатерининский канал, Severo-Yekaterininsky Kanal), or Catherine's Canal is an abandoned canal in the Komi Republic and Perm Krai in northern Russia, connecting the basin of the Northern Dvina with that of the Kama, a tributary of the Volga.

== History ==
The construction of the canal, named after Empress Catherine II, was started in 1785 and completed in 1822. Sixteen verst and 322 sazhen (around 18 km) long, it connected the North Keltma River (Russian: Северная Кельтма), a tributary of the Vychegda (which in its turn flows into the Northern Dvina), with the Dzhurich River, which flows into the South Keltma River (Russian: Южная Кельтма), a tributary of the Kama. The canal was usable by boats up to 6,000-8,000 pood (100-130 metric tons), but was officially abandoned in 1838, just 16 years after its opening, due to little use. It was still occasionally used by the local Komi Zyryan merchants during the spring and fall high-water seasons until the early 20th century.

== Present state ==
The disused canal, described by the Perm Krai Encyclopedia as "a small ditch with fallen banks" (небольшой ров с обвалившимися берегами) still exists. In 2007, members of the Perm Geography Club traveled along the canal in row boats, using chainsaws and axes to clear the logs and tree branches blocking the way. They have filed an application with the appropriate authorities to have the canal listed as a National Historic Site.

A village near the northern (Komi) end of the canal is still called Kanava, which means 'ditch' in Russian. Since 1828, the Northern Dvina is also connected with the Volga basin by a navigable route elsewhere, known as the Northern Dvina Canal.
