= Badiya =

Upcoming video game

- Developer: Semaphore
- Publisher: Semaphore
- Engine: Unity
- Platforms: Android; iOS; PlayStation 4; Windows; Xbox One
- Release: Battle Royale (iOS, Android); WW: 19 May 2020; Desert Survival (PC, PS4, XBO); WW: TBA
- Genre: Survival
- Modes: Single-player, multiplayer

Badiya (Arabic: بادية) is an upcoming open world survival video game title developed by Saudi Arabian developer Semaphore. The title refers to two different games with the same settings and content.

The first game, entitled Badiya: Desert Survival, is a single-player sandbox survival role-playing video game planned to be released for PlayStation 4, Xbox One, and Microsoft Windows. An Early Access beta was launched via Steam on 11 November 2016.

The second game, entitled Badiya: Battle Royale, is a multiplayer free-to-play battle royale online game that launched for iOS and Android devices in May 2020.

== Summary ==
The events of the game lie in the Arabian Desert in the 1920s, where the life is harsh, and players must explore and find the necessary supplies for survival. Although the desert is very vast, the players have the opportunity to discover the sites, villages, camps, ancient ruins, and are forced to deal with wildlife and residents of the area.

== Development ==
Badiya: Desert Survival, known as Badiya at the time, was originally announced by Semaphore in April 2016. In an interview with Kill Screen, Semaphore's director of development Ahmad Jadallah hoped Semaphore's project would help clarify how the Arab world is represented in video games (as certain game titles by Western developers used stereotype and poorly researched interpretations), and explain the history of modern Saudi Arabia's unification, although the game will focus on an individual's survival in the desert amid the violence during that time period following instability after the end of the Great War. Using the game's infinite procedural generation, individual players may have unique gameplay experiences.

Gameplay for Badiya was revealed during E3 2016. The game was originally announced for PlayStation 4, Xbox One, and Microsoft Windows, and that an Early Access beta would be available via Steam later that year.

Despite still being in Early Access, Badiya was retronymed with the subtitle Desert Survival when Semaphore announced Badiya: Battle Royale in April 2019. Although it shares much of the same settings and content, Battle Royale is a separate build from Desert Survival that focuses on free-for-all online battle royale gameplay. Battle Royale officially launched for iOS and Android devices worldwide on 19 May 2020, with plans to release the game on PlayStation 4, Xbox One, and Microsoft Windows in the future.

Badiya: Desert Survival is made with the Unity engine, whilst Badiya: Battle Royale is based on Unreal Engine 4.

== See also ==
- Unearthed: Trail of Ibn Battuta – a 2013 game by the same company.
