= Maly Kub =

River in Perm Krai, Russia

Physical characteristics
- Mouth: Veslyana
  - coordinates: 60°30′46″N 52°42′45″E
- Length: 15 km (9.3 mi)

Basin features
- Progression: Veslyana→ Kama→ Volga→ Caspian Sea

The Maly Kub (Russian: Малый Куб) is a river in Perm Krai, Russia, a left tributary of the Veslyana, which in turn is a tributary of the Kama. The Maly Kub is 15 kilometres (9 mi) long.
