= Badya =

River in Perm Krai, Russia

Physical characteristics
- Mouth
  - location: Chyornaya
  - coordinates: 60°40′48″N 52°22′16″E
- Length: 26 km (16 mi)

Basin features
- Progression: Chyornaya→ Veslyana→ Kama→ Volga→ Caspian Sea

The Badya (Russian: Бадья) is a river in Perm Krai, Russia, a left tributary of Chyornaya which in turn is a tributary of Veslyana. The river is 26 kilometres (16 mi) long. The source of the river is about 3 kilometres (2 mi) west of the settlement of Badya, near the border with Komi Republic.
