= South Keltma =

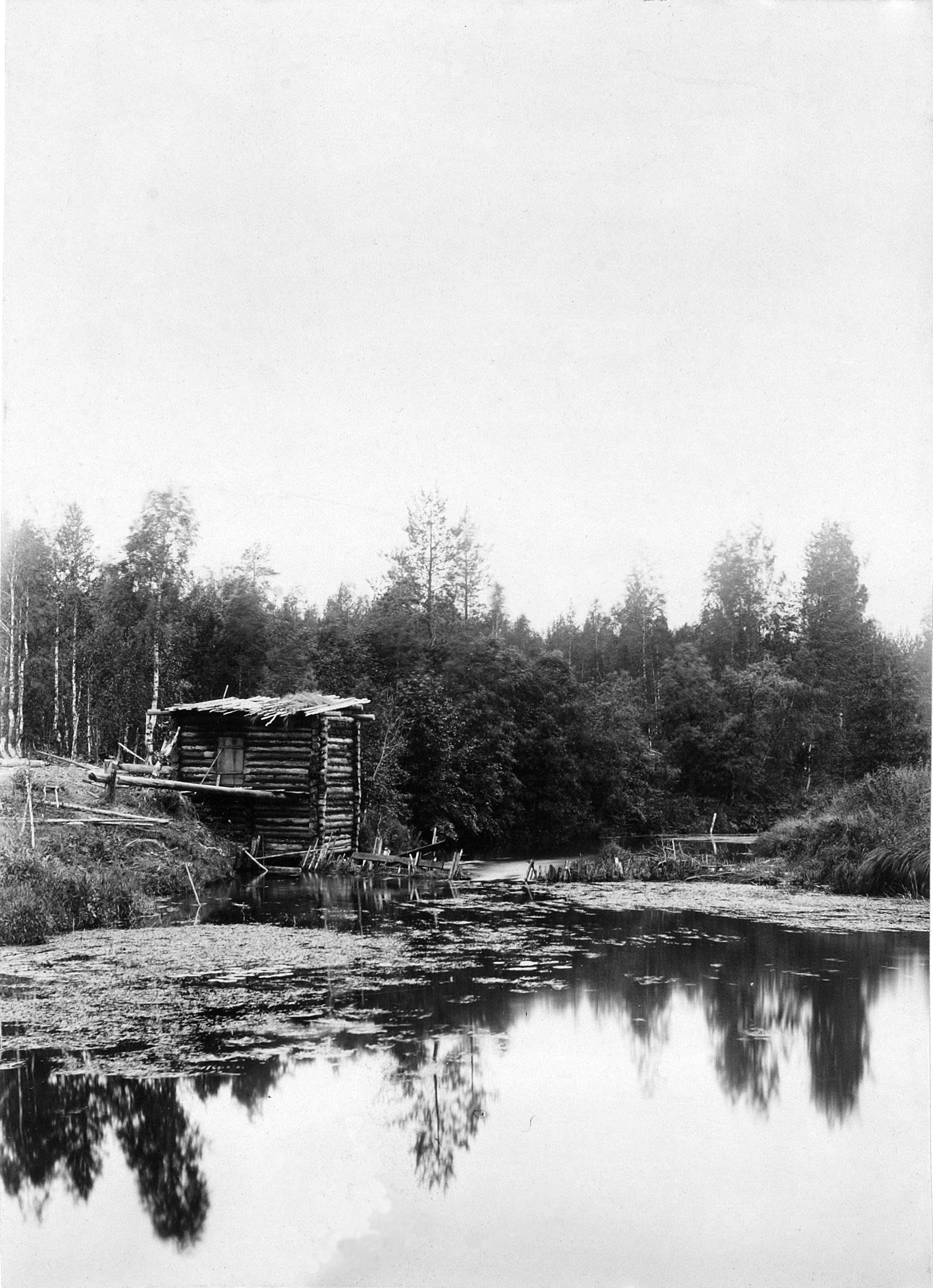

Location
- Country: Russia

Physical characteristics
- Source
  - location: Cherdynsky District
- Mouth: Kama
  - coordinates: 60°28′04″N 55°41′47″E
- Length: 172 km (107 mi)
- Basin size: 5,270 km^{2} (2,030 sq mi)

Basin features
- Progression: Kama→ Volga→ Caspian Sea

The South Keltma (Russian: Южная Кельтма - Yuzhnaya Keltma) is a river in Perm Krai, Russia, a left tributary of the Kama. It is 172 kilometres (107 mi) long, and its area of drainage basin is 5,270 square kilometres (2,030 mi^{2}). The source of the river is located in the north of Perm Krai, near the border with the Komi Republic, in Cherdynsky District. Its confluence with the Kama lies to the north of the village of Chepets. The river freezes up in the early November and stays under the ice until the end of April. There are many swamps near the river.

In 1785 – 1822 the Northern Catherine Canal was constructed. It connected the South Keltma with the North Keltma through the river Dzhurich. It was in operation only for 16 years.

Main tributaries:

- Left: Dzhurich, Olkhovka, Verhny Mal, Nizhny Mal;
- Right: Timshor.
