= Maly Chabes =

River in Perm Krai, Russia

Physical characteristics
- Mouth: Veslyana
  - coordinates: 60.8026°N 52.8219°E
- Length: 16 km (9.9 mi)

Basin features
- Progression: Veslyana→ Kama→ Volga→ Caspian Sea

The Maly Chabes (Russian: Малый Чабес) is a river in Perm Krai, Russia, a right tributary of the Veslyana, which in turn is a tributary of the Kama. The Maly Chabes is 16 kilometres (10 mi) long.
