= Utva (Perm Krai) =

River in Perm Krai, Russia

Physical characteristics
- Mouth: Veslyana
  - coordinates: 60°26′22″N 53°11′55″E
- Length: 76 km (47 mi)
- Basin size: 697 km^{2} (269 sq mi)

Basin features
- Progression: Veslyana→ Kama→ Volga→ Caspian Sea

The Utva (Russian: Утьва) is a river in Perm Krai, Russia, a right tributary of the Veslyana, which in turn is a tributary of the Kama. The river is 76 kilometres (47 mi) long, and its drainage basin covers 697 square kilometres (269 mi^{2}). The source of the river is in the extreme southwest of the Gaynsky District of Perm Krai, near the border with Kirov Oblast and the Komi Republic. The main tributaries are the Chugrum (right) and the Yuzhnaya Anva (left).
