= Timshor =

Location
- Country: Russia

Physical characteristics
- Source
  - location: Gaynsky District
- Mouth: South Keltma
  - coordinates: 60°29′44″N 55°31′58″E
- Length: 235 km (146 mi)
- Basin size: 2,650 km^{2} (1,020 sq mi)

Basin features
- Progression: South Keltma→ Kama→ Volga→ Caspian Sea

The Timshor (Russian: Тимшор, also: Timsher) is a river in Perm Krai, Russia, a right tributary of the South Keltma. It is 235 kilometres (146 mi) long, with drainage basin of 2,650 square kilometres (1,020 mi^{2}). It starts in the northwestern part of Perm Krai, in Gaynsky District, near the border with the Komi Republic. It flows into the South Keltma 15 kilometres (9 mi) from the larger river's mouth. There are many swamps and lakes along the river.

Main tributaries:

- Left: Okos, Chepets;
- Right: My, Bortom.
