= Vizyakha =

River in Perm Krai, Russia

Physical characteristics
- Mouth: Veslyana
  - coordinates: 60.6133°N 52.6894°E
- Length: 32 km (20 mi)

Basin features
- Progression: Veslyana→ Kama→ Volga→ Caspian Sea

The Vizyakha (Russian: Визяха) is a river in Perm Krai, Russia, a right tributary of the Veslyana, which in turn is a tributary of the Kama. The river is 32 kilometres (20 mi) long.
