= Ruch (river) =

River in Perm Krai, Russia

Physical characteristics
- Mouth: Veslyana
  - coordinates: 60°41′59″N 52°48′19″E
- Length: 70 km (43 mi)
- Basin size: 465 km^{2} (180 sq mi)

Basin features
- Progression: Veslyana→ Kama→ Volga→ Caspian Sea

The Ruch (Russian: Ручь) is a river in Perm Krai, Russia, a left tributary of the Veslyana, which in turn is a tributary of the Kama. The river is 48 kilometres (30 mi) long. The area of its drainage basin is 465 square kilometres (180 mi^{2}). Main tributaries: Tuykos (right) and Chuklya (left).
