= Bolshoy Chabes =

River in Perm Krai, Russia

Physical characteristics
- Mouth: Veslyana
  - coordinates: 60.8798°N 52.8981°E
- Length: 21 km (13 mi)

Basin features
- Progression: Veslyana→ Kama→ Volga→ Caspian Sea

The Bolshoy Chabes (Russian: Большой Чабес) is a river in Perm Krai and Komi Republic, Russia, a right tributary of Veslyana which in turn is a tributary of Kama. The river is 21 kilometres (13 mi) long.
