= Abbadie =

Abbadie or d'Abbadie is a French surname. Notable people with the surname include:

- Antoine-Thomson d'Abbadie (1810–1897), French explorer of notably Ethiopia
- Arnaud-Michel d'Abbadie (1815–1893), Antoine-Thomson d'Abbadie's brother, also an explorer
- Jakob Abbadie (c.1654–1727), Swiss theologian
- Jean-Jacques Blaise d'Abbadie (1726–1765), governor of French Louisiana
- Julio Abbadie (1930–2014), Uruguayan footballer
- Luis G. Abbadie (born 1968), Mexican writer
- Harry d'Abbadie d'Arrast (1897–1968), Argentinean born French screenwriter

== See also ==
- Abbadia (disambiguation)
- Badia (disambiguation)
