= Shipitsino, Kochyovsky District, Perm Krai =

Shipitsino Шипицино
- Village
- Location within Perm Krai Location within Russia
- Coordinates: 59°33′N 54°14′E
- Country: Russia
- Region: Perm Krai
- District: Kochyovsky District
- Time zone: UTC+5:00

Shipitsino (Russian: Шипицино) is a rural locality (a village) in Kochyovskoye Rural Settlement, Kochyovsky District, Perm Krai, Russia. The population was 25 as of 2010. There are 2 streets.

== Geography ==
Shipitsino is located 16 km north of Kochyovo (the district's administrative centre) by road.
