= Badia (surname) =

Badia or Badía is a surname. Notable people with the surname include:

- Antoni Maria Badia i Margarit (1920–2014), Spanish/Catalan linguist and philologist
- Carlo Agostino Badia (1672–1738), Italian court composer
- Conchita Badía, stage name of Spanish soprano and pianist Concepció Badia Millàs (1897–1975)
- Domingo Badía y Leblich (1767–1818), Spanish traveller better known as Ali Bey el Abbassi
- Edgar Badia (born 1998), Spanish footballer
- Francesc Badia Batalla (1923–2020), Andorran public servant, judge and historian
- Gerard Badía (born 1989), Spanish footballer
- José Badia (born 1945), Monegasque politician
- Lola Badia (born 1951), Spanish philologist, medievalist
- Maria Badia i Cutchet (born 1947), Spanish politician
- Miquel Badia (1906–1936), radical Catalan separatist
- Pedro Franco Badía (1935–2016), Secretary of Interior and Police of the Dominican Republic
- Pedro Llosas Badía (1870–1955), Spanish politician
- Rosa Badia (born 1966), Spanish computer scientist
- Tommaso Badia (1483–1547), Italian cardinal
