= Luis G. Abbadie =

Mexican writer

- Born: August 13, 1968 (age 58); Guadalajara (Jalisco), Mexico
- Occupations: Novelist, Short story writer, Occult writer
- Partner: Marisol Soto (2003-2003)
- Children: 1
- Writing career
- Pen name: Wisdom Stone, Cesar E. Pratts
- Genres: Horror, Fantasy, Science fiction, Neopaganism
- Website: luis-abbadie.com

Luis G. Abbadie (born August 13, 1968) is a Mexican writer specializing in horror, paganism, pseudobibliographies and paramythologies, including horror and fantasy short stories. He has contributed frequently to the Cthulhu Mythos.

He has coordinated workshops and given courses on these topics. He has been a recipient of grants from the Fondo Estatal para la Cultura y las Artes de Jalisco (Jalisco State Fund for Culture and the Arts; 1999–2000). He has collaborated on anthologies and magazines in Spain, France, Argentina, and North America.

== Career ==
Abbadie was born in Guadalajara, Jalisco.

During his literary development, he participated in workshops coordinated by Flaviano Castañeda Valencia, Víctor Manuel Pazarín, Gabriel Gómez, and others.

When El último relato de Ambrose Bierce (1995) was first published, only 250 copies were issued. In 1996, a new edition of this work was announced, but it was supposedly canceled before it was ever brought to fruition. The journal El Informador (January 3, 1996) mentioned that this second edition was published and sold out.

El grito de la máscara (1998) contains El último relato de Ambrose Bierce, edited and expanded. It was re-edited by Cibermancia Editores retitled as El último relato de Ambrose Bierce (2007).

Since 1992, Abbadie has worked on his exhaustive story of the Necronomicon, based on and continuing the stories he wrote for the Cthulhu Mythos. El Necronómicon: un comentario (2000) is a synthesis of his work compiled up to that time. Due to his various writings on the subject, he is considered an expert in the Necronomicon. Códice Otarolense (2002) with the subtitle of Sumario de la historia de la formación del mundo y de los dioses y diablos de la Nueva España, con una exposición de las hechicerías y alabanzas de los indios naturales de esta tierra, hecho y recopilado por Fray Guillermo de Otarola y Guzmán, de la orden de San Francisco, en el mes de Agosto del año de 1548, para el muy reverendísimo Señor Don Fray Juan de Zumárraga, Obispo de la muy leal y gran Ciudad de México was published by the Apoyo a Jóvenes Creadores, Subdivisión Literatura, del Fondo Estatal para la Cultura y las Artes (FECA) del Estado de Jalisco (Support for Young Creators, Literary Subdivision of the Jalisco State Fund for Culture and the Arts, 1999-2000 edition.

Of Gods and Time (2007) is his first book in English.

His most recent book is 2012: El código secreto del Necronomicón (Rémora Editorial, 2010).

Within the novel there appear personalities from the past and present of the city of Guadalajara, such as Enrique González Martínez, Álvaro Leonor Ochoa, Raffles, the Mataindigentes (Indigents' Killer) or Juan Kraeppellin; in the author's words, "the three subjects overlapping are: Guadalajara, its places and personalities; the Necronomicon and its mythology; and New Age doctrines, concerning aliens and 2012.

— Luis G. Abbadie, La Jornada Jalisco, August 28, 2010

He is the author of an essay about horror literature that has been published several times in Mexico, Argentina and Spain.

== Paganism ==
Luis G. Abbadie has studied paganism and neopaganism. He has focused on the study of Wicca for some time. His participation in the Primer Encuentro Nacional Wicca México (First National Meeting of Wicca, Mexico), Beltane 2003, an event organized by the now-defunct Círculo Gaia was controversial, as well as in the subsequent reply from Carmen Orellana (Tarwe Nén), and was his first major participation in the neopagan community.

Although he initially favored the use of the word Wicca to refer to the different manifestations of modern witchcraft, including more indigenous types, he became uncomfortable with the eclectic, hybrid nature of what he calls 'Neo-Wicca.' He distanced himself from it and completely changed his position. He outlined connections between what he chose to call 'Stregoneria' and paganism. 'Stregheria' is represented in published works such as Raven Grimassi as 'popular neopaganism'.

Abbadie wrote El Sendero de los Brujos (2004), a book directed toward young readers as they are the ones recently attracted to neopaganism. In it, he tries to clarify very basic misunderstandings that he has observed among Latin American neopagans. He also attempts to give orientation to neophytes in Wicca and neopaganism. He has formed a small group studying reconstructed Stregoneria.

Upon discovering other forms of traditions European witchcraft, he began his formal apprenticeship of Scottish witchcraft, called Hedgewitch o Circle Magic, which he has dubbed Crossways Craft or rather Oficio del Cruce de Caminos, adopting an already-existing phrase to designate his personal preference.

== Bibliography ==
- El último relato de Ambrose Bierce (Ediciones del Plenilunio, México, 1995).
- El grito de la máscara (Grupo Editorial Minerva, méxico, 1998). 136 pages. Re-published and expanded as El último relato de Ambrose Bierce.
- El Necronomicon: un comentario (La Otra Orilla, México, 2000). 54 pages.
- Códice Otarolense (Ediciones Euterpe, México, 2002). 544 pages.
- El Sendero de los Brujos (Ediciones Veglia, México, 2004). 120 pages (signed as Luis Abbadie - Wisdom Stone).
- El último relato de Ambrose Bierce (Cibermancia Editores, México, 2007). Republication of El grito de la máscara.
- Of Gods and Time (Cibermancia Editores, México, 2007).
- Noches Paganas: Cuentos Narrados Junto al Fuego del Sabbath (Ediciones Veglia, México, 2008)
- 2012: El código secreto del Necronomicón (Rémora Editorial, 2010)
