= Unearthed: Trail of Ibn Battuta =

2013 video game

- Developer: Semaphore
- Publisher: Semanoor International
- Director: Ahmad Jadallah
- Artist: Mohammad Khaleel
- Writer: Ahmad Jadallah
- Engine: Unity
- Platforms: Microsoft Windows, Mac OS X, iOS, PlayStation 3, Ouya, Android
- Release: Episode 1 PlayStation 3, iOS: EU: May 29, 2013; Episode 1 – Gold Edition; Microsoft Windows, OS X: WW: January 3, 2014; Android: WW: May 28, 2014
- Genre: Action-adventure
- Mode: Single-player

Unearthed: Trail of Ibn Battuta (Arabic: الرّكاز: في أثر ابنِ بطّوطة) is a 2013 episodic action-adventure video game developed by Saudi Arabian game developer Semaphore, and published by parent company Semanoor International. Episode 1 of the game was released between 2013 and 2014 on the PlayStation 3 (via PSN), Microsoft Windows, Mac OS X (both via Steam, and the latter also via Mac App Store), as well as on iOS, and Android devices, including Ouya.

Following overwhelmingly negative reviews of Episode 1, in April 2018, Semaphore announced a full sequel to the game entitled Al Rekaz is in development, which is built from the ground up using Unreal Engine 4. As of 2026, no updates have been made of the sequel's release date.

== Synopsis ==
When Arab fortune hunter Faris Jawad and his archaeologist sister Dania receive a call to visit Morocco they embark on an exotic adventure throughout the Middle East on the trail of the famous Muslim explorer Ibn Battuta. The trail would not be clear however as Faris would have to overcome an unholy alliance of a militia leader, a weapons dealer and a wealthy antiquities smuggler who are after the same goal.

== Plot ==
The first episode begins in medias res as Arab fortune hunter Faris Jawad (Jeff Rosick) appears wounded and out to rescue his sister, Dania (Katie Crown). Once he confronts a wealthy antiques smuggler, Quinton, the plot jumps back three weeks earlier.

Faris and Dania are in Egypt and are on an expedition to uncover a hidden treasure inside the tomb of Pharaoh Ahmose. Faris then enters the tomb alone while solving puzzles and avoiding hazards to get to a small box containing Ahmose's prized possession. At that moment, the tomb is attacked by mercenaries, forcing Faris to shoot his way back to Dania. Dania is nowhere in sight when Faris returns but he is confronted by the mercenary leader Ozgur. After Faris defeats him in hand-to-hand combat, Dania appears and scares off Ozgur by shooting in his direction. Faris and Dania make their escape on an ATV while Ozgur vows revenge.

Faris then receives a phone call from a man named Rasheed Al Kalabi (David Lodge) who invites them to Morocco to show them a diary left behind by Ibn Battuta. Upon arrival, Rasheed takes them to a cafe to explain that he is a descendant of Ibn Juzzay who was a writer for the sultan who documented Ibn Battuta's travels. When they return to Rasheed's apartment they find the door open as a thief runs off with the diary (most likely a contact of Quinton). Faris chases the thief along the rooftops and then beats him up. Before Faris can get any information from the thief, the thief is shot and killed by a sniper, which attracts the attention of the police. Faris sneaks past the police and drives Rasheed's car out of the city. Since the thief did not have the diaries when Faris caught him, they are left without a lead until Rasheed admits that he has a copy of it, fortunately hidden in the glove compartment. From there, the three head off to uncover the mysterious discoveries of Ibn Battuta, setting up the events for a future episode.

== Development ==
Unearthed: Trail of Ibn Battuta is one of the first games for the PlayStation 3 featuring the Unity game engine. Episode 1 was released on May 29, 2013 for the PlayStation 3 (PAL version only), and iOS. The PC and Android versions were also originally announced for that date, but both failed to launch on the respective platforms; in the former's case, it was mainly due for not being approved by Steam's Greenlight community before the suggested date. On January 3, 2014, the game was eventually released worldwide for the PC platforms under the title Episode 1 – Gold Edition, in which the developer claims this new edition has addressed and improved some of the game's technical issues. The previous releases on PlayStation 3 and iOS received the Gold Edition version as a free update. The newer version later became available for Android platforms by May 28, 2014. Despite the initial updates, the Gold Edition has been patched multiple times. As of May 2014, Semaphore confirmed that Episode 2 is in development, and would feature events set in Ibn Battuta's lifetime, as well as additional playable characters. There has been no further information regarding Episode 2 ever since, as Semaphore focused on other projects, such as Badiya. In April 2018, Semaphore announced they are working on a full sequel to the game.

The game was initially planned to be also available on Xbox Live Arcade and WiiWare, but Semaphore had since silently delisted those platforms. A different version of the game was also planned as a Facebook app. In September 2014, Semaphore announced Episode 1 was in development for PlayStation 4 and PlayStation Vita, however neither of these versions have been released.

== Reception ==
Reception

Aggregate score
Aggregator	Score
Metacritic	11/100

Review scores
Publication	Score
IGN Middle East	3.0/10
True-Gaming.net	1.0/10
Saudi Gamer	1/5

The first episode of Unearthed: Trail of Ibn Battuta has been panned by critics and players alike. Main criticisms towards the game were directed at broken gameplay mechanics, graphics, clunky animations and its unoriginality with most critics comparing the game unfavourably to the Uncharted series. It currently holds a score of 11 out of 100 on Metacritic.

IGN Middle East gave the game a 3.0 out of 10; "With its clunky controls, poor level design, and horrible writing, Unearthed: The Trail of Ibn Battuta Episode 1 is an awful mess. The game did get a bit of negative attention for being a blatant Uncharted ripoff, however somewhere deep down I had hoped that it would force us to reject those prejudices, and stand high in its own right. Unearthed, unfortunately, does none of that and fails resoundingly." The Sixth Axis gave the game a 1 out of 10; "It's all just laughably bad, so much so that there were a few times I couldn't help but explode with laughter at how terrible the animations, gameplay or everything else was."
