= Abbadia, Siena =

Abbadia
- Frazione
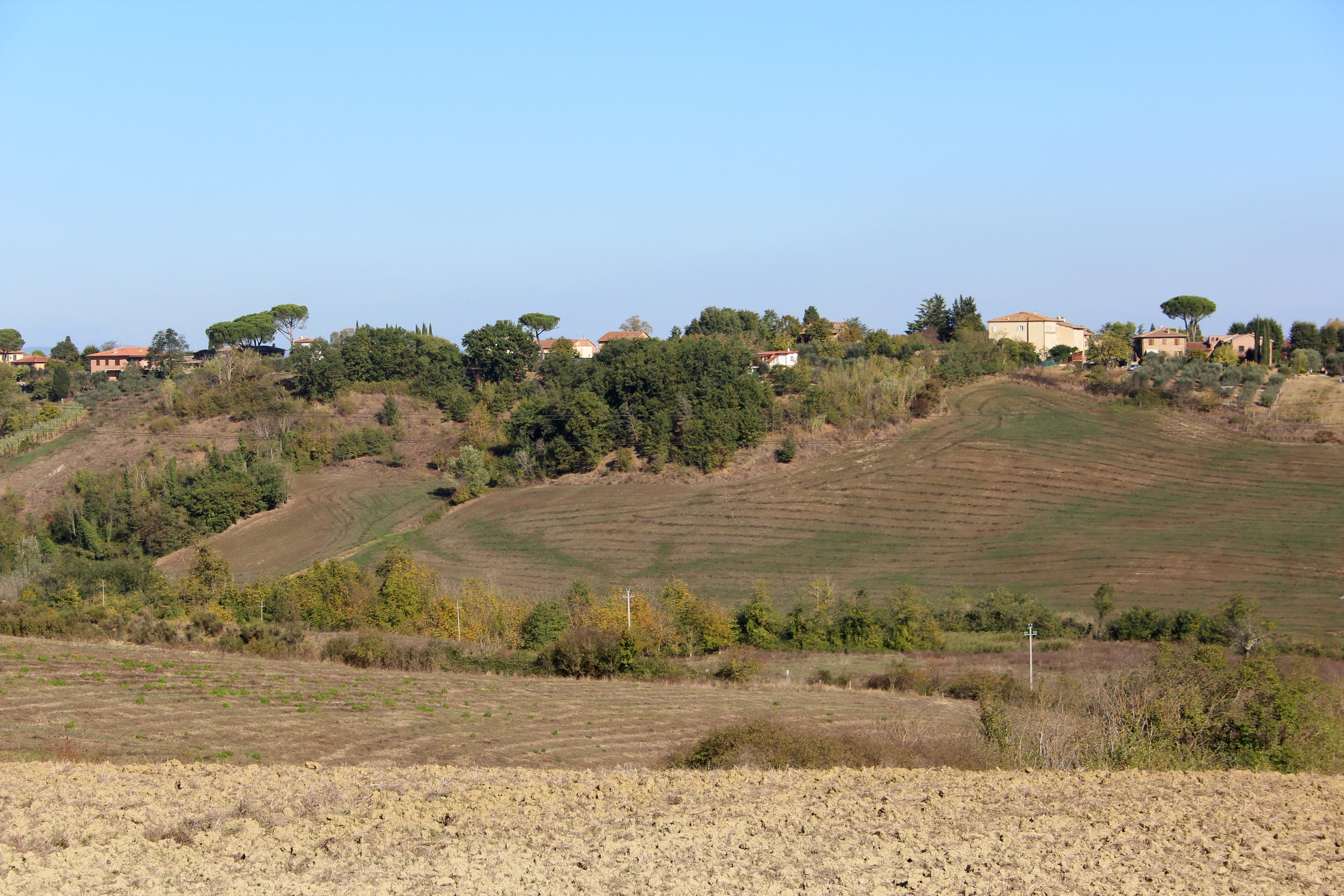
- View of Abbadia

- Location of Abbadia in Italy
- Coordinates: 43°17′47″N 11°22′47″E
- Country: Italy
- Region: Tuscany
- Province: Siena (SI)
- Comune: Siena
- Elevation: 238 m (781 ft)

Population (2001)
  - Total: 169
- Time zone: UTC+1 (CET)
  - Summer (DST): UTC+2 (CEST)

Abbadia is a village in Tuscany, central Italy, in the comune of Siena, province of Siena. At the time of the 2001 census its population was 169.

Abbadia is about 6 km from Siena.
