= North Keltma =

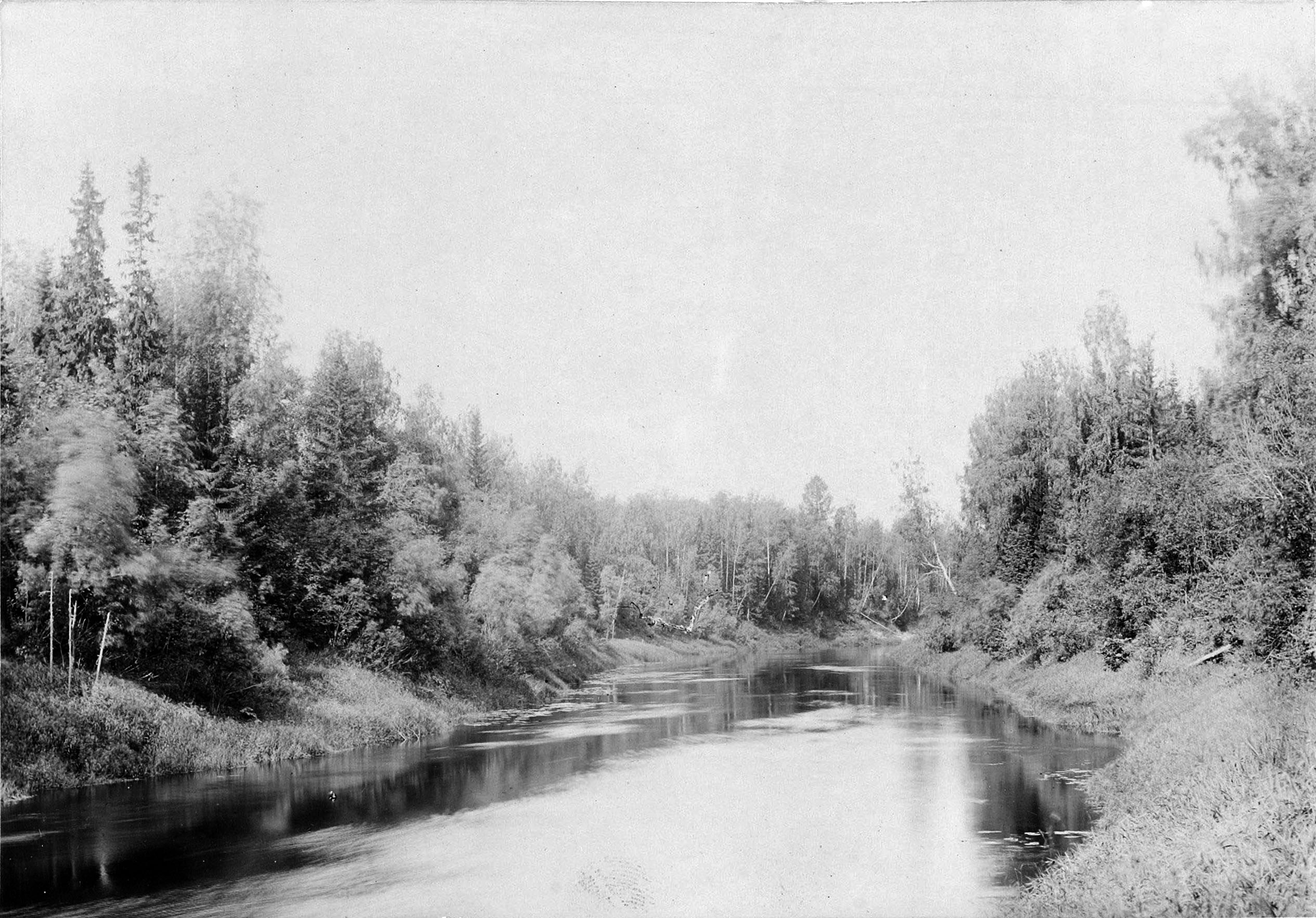

- Scheme of the Northern Dvina basin.

Location
- Country: Russia

Physical characteristics
- Mouth: Vychegda
  - coordinates: 61°28′40″N 53°58′44″E
- Length: 155 km (96 mi)
- Basin size: 7,960 km^{2} (3,070 sq mi)

Basin features
- Progression: Vychegda→ Northern Dvina→ White Sea

The North Keltma (Russian: Северная Кельтма - Severnaya Keltma) is a river in Komi Republic, Russia, a left tributary of the Vychegda. It is 155 kilometres (96 mi) long, with a drainage basin of 7,960 square kilometres (3,070 mi^{2}). It starts in the extreme south of the Komi Republic, near the border with Perm Krai. It flows into the Vychegda near the settlement of Kerchomya. There are many swamps along the river.

The river freezes in the early November and stays under the ice until early May. It is connected with the South Keltma by the Northern Catherine Canal, which was constructed in 1785–1822 but operated for only 16 years.

Main tributaries:

- Left: Okos, Voch, Vol;
- Right: Yol, Michayol
