= Chyornaya (Veslyana) =

River in Russia

Physical characteristics
- Mouth: Veslyana
  - coordinates: 60.4796°N 52.6777°E
- Length: 149 km (93 mi)
- Basin size: 1,800 km^{2} (690 sq mi)

Basin features
- Progression: Veslyana→ Kama→ Volga→ Caspian Sea

The Chyornaya (Russian: Чёрная) is a river in Perm Krai and Komi Republic, Russia, a right tributary of the Veslyana, which in turn is a tributary of the Kama. The river is 149 kilometres (93 mi) long, and its drainage basin covers 1,800 square kilometres (690 mi^{2}).

The source of the river is in Koygorodsky District of Komi Republic, near the border with Perm Krai, 196 metres (643 ft) above sea level. Its mouth is located near the settlement of Ust-Chyornaya, 142 metres (466 ft) above sea level, 115 kilometres (71 mi) from the mouth of the Veslyana. The main tributaries are Sol, Malaya Sol, Badya (left); Peles, Lel, Parmanka (right).
