= Veslyana =

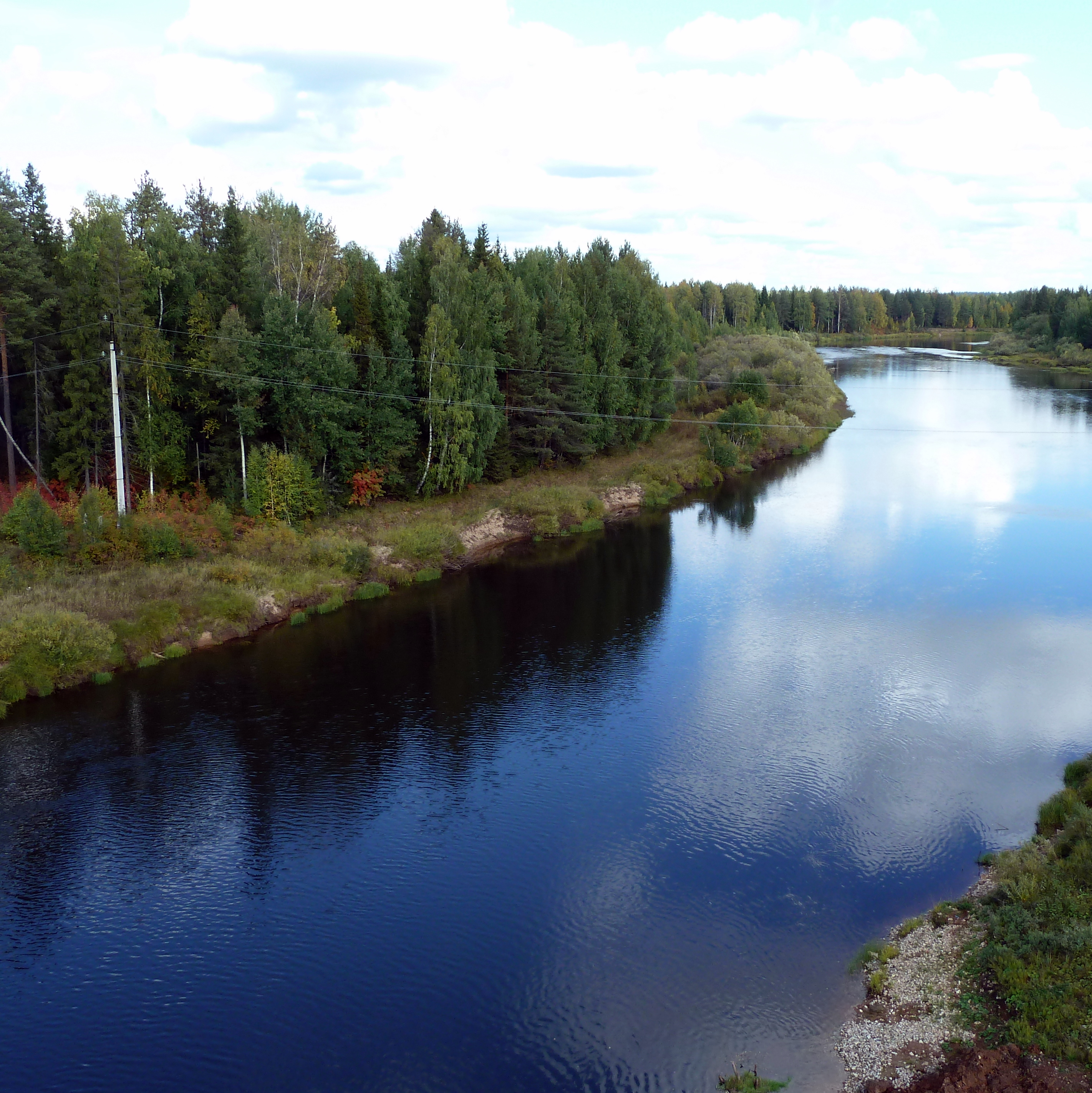

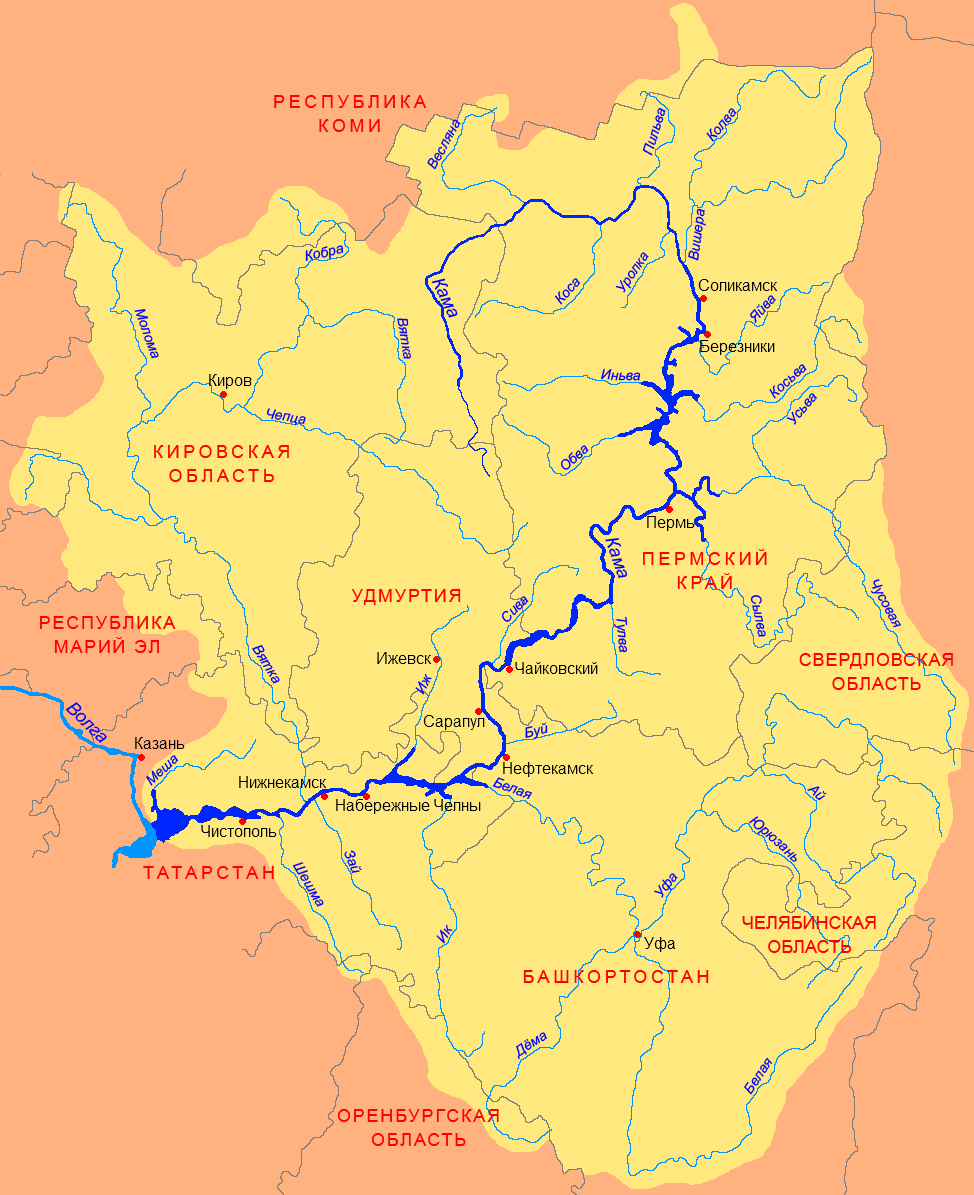
- Scheme of the Kama River Basin.

Location
- Country: Russia

Physical characteristics
- Mouth: Kama
  - coordinates: 60.3239°N 54.0067°E
  - elevation: 145 m (476 ft)
- Length: 266 km (165 mi)
- Basin size: 7,490 km^{2} (2,890 sq mi)

Basin features
- Progression: Kama→ Volga→ Caspian Sea

The Veslyana (Russian: Весляна) – is a river in Perm Krai and Komi Republic, Russia, a left tributary of the Kama, which in turn is a tributary of the Volga. It starts in the southeastern portion of Ust-Kulomsky District of the Komi Republic, about 7 kilometres (4 mi) from the border with Perm Krai. It flows through the Gaynsky District of Perm Krai and into the Kama River 1,193 kilometres (741 mi) from its mouth, 145 metres (476 ft) above sea level, near the rural locality of Ust-Veslyana. The river is 266 kilometres (165 mi) long, and the area of its drainage basin is 7,490 square kilometres (2,890 mi^{2}). There are numerous deposits of zeolite-bearing rocks spread throughout the river.

== Main tributaries ==
- Left: Travyanka, Ruch, Bolshoy Kub, Maly Kub, Dozovka;
- Right: Bolshoy Chabes, Maly Chabes, Vizyakha, Chyornaya, Utva.
