= Gayny, Perm Krai =

Rural locality in Gaynsky District, Komi-Permyak Okrug, Russia

Coordinates: 60°18′13″N 54°20′13″E

Gayny (Russian: Гайны; Komi-Permyak: Гайна, Gajna) is a rural locality (a settlement) and the administrative center of Gaynsky District of Komi-Permyak Okrug in Perm Krai, Russia, located 156 kilometers (97 mi) north from the town of Kudymkar on the right bank of the Kama River. Population: 4,050 (2010 census); 4,507 (2002 census); 4,796 (1989 Soviet census).

== History ==
It was first mentioned in 1579. This year is considered the official foundation of the settlement. It was granted urban-type settlement status on January 2, 1963, but was demoted back to a rural locality in 1998.

In 1926, it had 263 households and a population of 1,051 (including 1,008 Russians, 39 Komi-Permyaks, and 4 people of others ethnicities).

== Climate ==
Gayny has subarctic climate (Köppen climate classification Dfc), with warm summers and very cold winters.

Climate data for Gayny
Month	Jan	Feb	Mar	Apr	May	Jun	Jul	Aug	Sep	Oct	Nov	Dec	Year
Record high °C (°F)	5.6 (42.1)	6.0 (42.8)	13.9 (57.0)	26.4 (79.5)	32.0 (89.6)	34.0 (93.2)	32.8 (91.0)	32.4 (90.3)	28.7 (83.7)	25.0 (77.0)	11.0 (51.8)	6.0 (42.8)	34.0 (93.2)
Mean daily maximum °C (°F)	−12.0 (10.4)	−9.9 (14.2)	−1.1 (30.0)	6.5 (43.7)	14.3 (57.7)	20.0 (68.0)	22.7 (72.9)	18.5 (65.3)	12.2 (54.0)	3.5 (38.3)	−5.0 (23.0)	−9.5 (14.9)	5.0 (41.0)
Daily mean °C (°F)	−15.4 (4.3)	−13.6 (7.5)	−5.3 (22.5)	2.0 (35.6)	8.9 (48.0)	14.8 (58.6)	17.9 (64.2)	13.8 (56.8)	8.3 (46.9)	0.9 (33.6)	−7.6 (18.3)	−12.6 (9.3)	1.0 (33.8)
Mean daily minimum °C (°F)	−18.8 (−1.8)	−17.3 (0.9)	−9.5 (14.9)	−2.6 (27.3)	3.5 (38.3)	9.2 (48.6)	12.2 (54.0)	9.2 (48.6)	4.5 (40.1)	−1.7 (28.9)	−10.3 (13.5)	−15.8 (3.6)	−3.1 (26.4)
Record low °C (°F)	−46.0 (−50.8)	−43.0 (−45.4)	−34.0 (−29.2)	−24.0 (−11.2)	−11.4 (11.5)	−3.0 (26.6)	0.9 (33.6)	−3.2 (26.2)	−6.4 (20.5)	−25.0 (−13.0)	−36.1 (−33.0)	−48.0 (−54.4)	−48.0 (−54.4)
Average precipitation mm (inches)	52.4 (2.06)	32.9 (1.30)	46.9 (1.85)	52.9 (2.08)	69.1 (2.72)	75.3 (2.96)	83.8 (3.30)	68.2 (2.69)	58.7 (2.31)	55.6 (2.19)	48.1 (1.89)	37.3 (1.47)	681.2 (26.82)
Source: climatebase.ru
