= Gaynsky District =

Gaynsky District Гайнский район (Russian)
- District
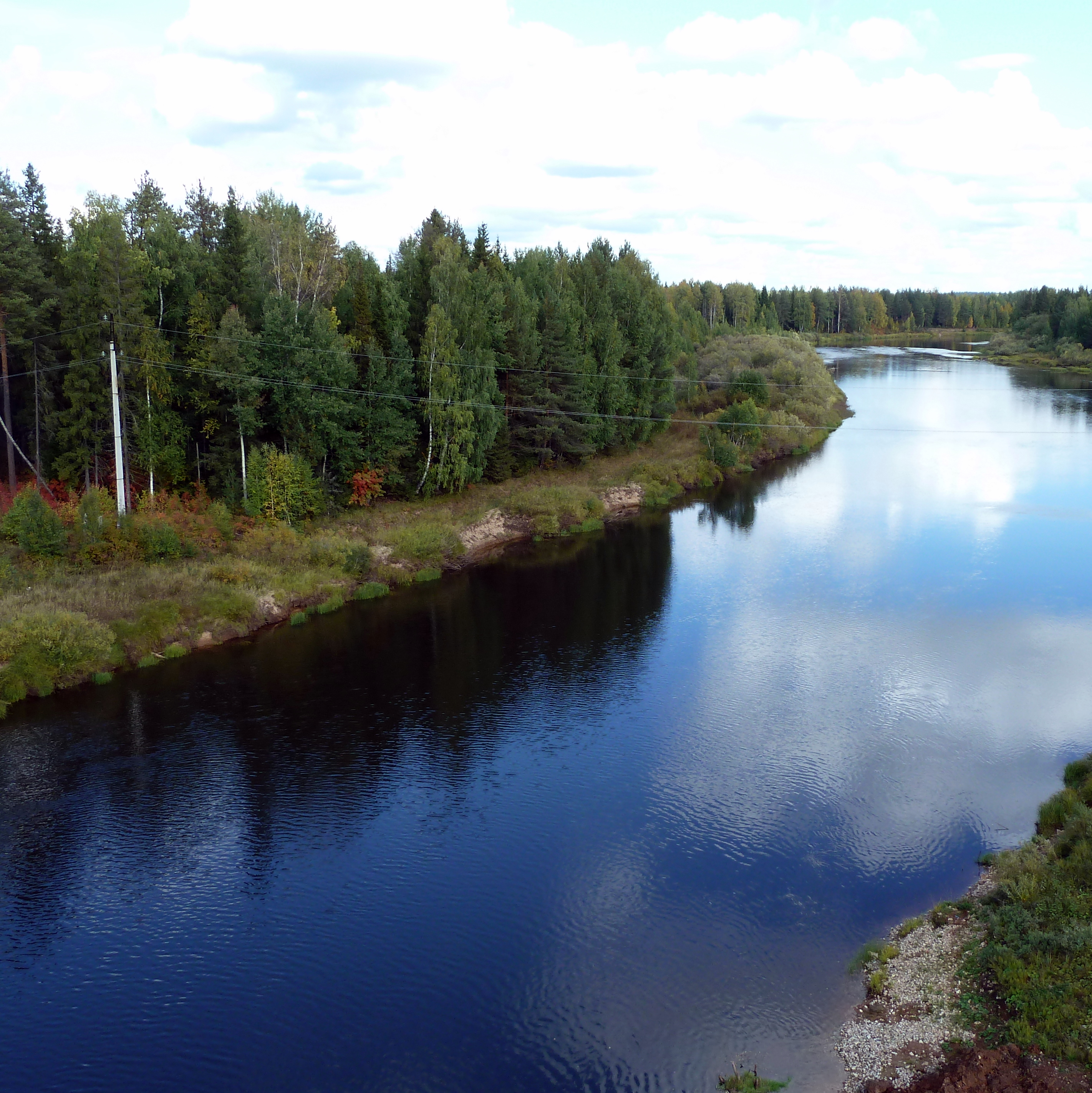
- Vesliana River, Gaynsky District

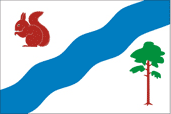
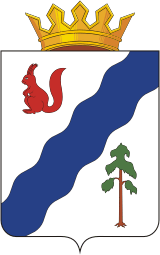
- Flag Coat of arms
- Location of Gaynsky District in Komi-Permyak Okrug, Perm Krai
- Coordinates: 60.511°N 51.273°E
- Country: Russia
- Federal subject: Perm Krai
- Established: September 15, 1926
- Administrative center: Gayny

Area
  - Total: 14,928 km^{2} (5,764 sq mi)

Population (2010 Census)
  - Total: 13,802
  - Density: 0.92457/km^{2} (2.3946/sq mi)
  - Urban: 0%
  - Rural: 100%

Administrative structure
  - Inhabited localities: 39 rural localities

Municipal structure
  - Municipally incorporated as: Gaynsky Municipal District
  - Municipal divisions: 0 urban settlements, 7 rural settlements
- Time zone: UTC+5 (MSK+2)
- OKTMO ID: 57814000
- Website: http://www.gainy.ru/

Gaynsky District (Russian: Га́йнский райо́н; Komi-Permyak: Гайна район, Gajna rajon) is an administrative district (raion) of Komi-Permyak Okrug of Perm Krai, Russia; one of the thirty-three in the krai. As a municipal division, it is incorporated as Gaynsky Municipal District. It is located in the northwest of the krai. The area of the district is 14,928 square kilometers (5,764 sq mi). Its administrative center is the rural locality (a settlement) of Gayny. Population: 13,802 (2010 census); 17,351 (2002 census); 21,477 (1989 Soviet census). The population of Gayny accounts for 29.9% of the district's total population.

== Geography and climate ==
Major rivers flowing through the district include the Kama and its tributary the Veslyana. Other significant rivers are the Chyornaya, the Timshor, and the Lupya. The largest lake is Lake Adovo with an area of 3.6 square kilometers (1.4 sq mi).

Climate is temperate continental with long and cold winters. Mid-January temperature is −16.7 °C (1.9 °F); mid-July temperature is +17.3 °C (63.1 °F). Annual precipitation is 500–550 millimeters (20–22 in). In the north of the district, pine forests dominate, comprising about 50% of the total forested area, while in the south spruce forests are more common.

== History ==
The district was established on September 15, 1926.

== Demographics ==
The Komi-Permyak people are the aboriginal population. The population is concentrated along the Kama, the Veslyana, and the Chyornaya Rivers.

Ethnic composition (as of the 2002 Census):

- Russians: 56.5%
- Komi-Permyak people: 34%
- Tatars: 3.7%

== Economy ==
The economy of the district is based on timber industry. There are also dairy and brick factories and a mechanical-repair plant in Gayny. Arable lands make up less than 1% of the total district's area.

=== Transportation ===
Road network is poorly developed, with the density of only about 0.6 kilometers (0.37 mi) of paved roars per 100 square kilometers (39 sq mi). Gayny is connected by roads with Kudymkar and Syktyvkar; there are no bus station in the settlement, and the only bus stop is in its center. The Kama River plays a significant role in transportation.

== Sources ==
- Законодательное собрание Пермской области. Закон №416-67 от 28 февраля 1996 г. «Об административно-территориальном устройстве Пермского края», в ред. Закона №504-ПК от 9 июля 2015 г. «О внесении изменений в Закон Пермской области "Об административно-территориальном устройстве Пермского края"». Вступил в силу с момента опубликования. Опубликован: "Звезда", №38, 12 марта 1996 г. (Legislative Assembly of Perm Oblast. Law #416-67 of February 28, 1996 On the Administrative-Territorial Structure of Perm Krai, as amended by the Law #504-PK of July 9, 2015 On Amending the Law of Perm Oblast "On the Administrative-Territorial Structure of Perm Krai". Effective as of the moment of publication.).
- Законодательное собрание Коми-Пермяцкого автономного округа. Закон №60 от 19 ноября 2004 г. «Об утверждении границ и о наделении статусом муниципальных образований Гайнского района Пермского края», в ред. Закона №438-ПК от 2 февраля 2015 г. «О внесении изменений в отдельные Законы Пермской области и Коми-Пермяцкого автономного округа». Вступил в силу через 10 дней со дня официального опубликования. Опубликован: "Парма", №238–239, 30 ноября 2004 г. (Legislative Assembly of Komi-Permyak Autonomous Okrug. Law #60 of November 19, 2004 On Establishing the Borders and on Granting the Status to the Municipal Formations of Gaynsky District of Perm Krai, as amended by the Law #438-PK of February 2, 2015 On Amending Various Laws of Perm Oblast and Komi-Permyak Autonomous Okrug. Effective as of the day which is 10 days following the day of the official publication.).
