= Sredny =

Sredny (Russian: Средний; masculine), Srednyaya (Средняя; feminine), or Sredneye (Среднее; neuter) is a toponym:

== Inhabited localities ==
Urban localities

- Sredny, Irkutsk Oblast, a work settlement in Usolsky District of Irkutsk Oblast

Rural localities

- Sredny, Arkhangelsk Oblast, a settlement in Verkhneshonoshsky Selsoviet of Velsky District of Arkhangelsk Oblast
- Sredny, Kaluga Oblast, a selo in Kozelsky District of Kaluga Oblast
- Sredny, Krasnodar Krai, a khutor in Alexeye-Tenginsky Rural Okrug of Tbilissky District of Krasnodar Krai
- Sredny, Kursk Oblast, a khutor in Vyshnereutchansky Selsoviet of Medvensky District of Kursk Oblast
- Sredny, Nizhny Novgorod Oblast, a settlement under the administrative jurisdiction of the work settlement of imeni Stepana Razina in Lukoyanovsky District of Nizhny Novgorod Oblast
- Sredny, Penza Oblast, a settlement in Golitsynsky Selsoviet of Nizhnelomovsky District of Penza Oblast
- Sredny, Samara Oblast, a settlement in Isaklinsky District of Samara Oblast
- Sredny, Alexandrovsky District, Stavropol Krai, a khutor in Srednensky Selsoviet of Alexandrovsky District of Stavropol Krai
- Sredny, Krasnogvardeysky District, Stavropol Krai, a khutor in Rodykovsky Selsoviet of Krasnogvardeysky District of Stavropol Krai
- Sredny, Tula Oblast, a settlement in Prigorodny Rural Okrug of Plavsky District of Tula Oblast
- Srednyaya Akhtuba, a settlement in Volgograd Oblast, Russia
- Srednyaya Kamyshinka, a settlement in Volgograd Oblast, Russia
- Srednyaya Kuba, a settlement in Perm Krai, Russia
- Srednyaya Oka, a settlement in Bashkortostan, Russia
- Srednyaya Poltavka, a settlement in Amur Oblast, Russia
- Srednyaya Sluda, a settlement in Vologda Oblast, Russia
- Srednyaya Stupolokhta, a settlement in Vologda Oblast, Russia
- Srednyaya Sultanovka, a settlement in Astrakhan Oblast, Russia
- Sredneye Babalarovo, a settlement in Bashkortostan, Russia
- Sredneye Bachmanovo, a settlement in Perm Krai, Russia
- Sredneye, Vologda Oblast, a settlement in Vologda Oblast, Russia

Historical localities

- Srednyaya, a colony included in Alexandrovskaya Volost of Alexandrovsky Uyezd of Arkhangelsk Governorate of the Russian SFSR upon its establishment in 1920.

== Other ==
- Sredny Ostrov Airfield, a military airfield on an island of Krasnoyarsk Krai, Russia
- Sredny Peninsula, a peninsula in Murmansk Oblast, Russia
- Sredny Stog culture, an archaeological culture from the 5th–4th millennia BC
- Srednyaya Zheleznaya, a river in Sverdlovsk Oblast, Russia
- Sredneye (lake, Altai Krai), a body of water in Altai Krai, Russia
