= Baranovo =

Baranovo (Russian: Бараново) is the name of several rural localities in Russia.

== Modern localities ==
=== Ivanovo Oblast ===
As of 2012, two rural localities in Ivanovo Oblast bear this name:

- Baranovo, Puchezhsky District, Ivanovo Oblast, a village in Puchezhsky District
- Baranovo, Verkhnelandekhovsky District, Ivanovo Oblast, a selo in Verkhnelandekhovsky District

=== Kirov Oblast ===
As of 2012, one rural locality in Kirov Oblast bears this name:

- Baranovo, Kirov Oblast, a village in Nikolsky Rural Okrug of Yaransky District; 57°23′N 48°11′E

=== Kostroma Oblast ===
As of 2012, four rural localities in Kostroma Oblast bear this name:

- Baranovo, Buysky District, Kostroma Oblast, a village in Baranovskoye Settlement of Buysky District; 58°30′N 41°36′E
- Baranovo, Nerekhtsky District, Kostroma Oblast, a village in Volzhskoye Settlement of Nerekhtsky District; 57°28′N 40°52′E
- Baranovo, Sharyinsky District, Kostroma Oblast, a village in Ivanovskoye Settlement of Sharyinsky District; 58°5′N 45°31′E
- Baranovo, Susaninsky District, Kostroma Oblast, a village in Sokirinskoye Settlement of Susaninsky District; 58°10′N 41°35′E

=== Kursk Oblast ===
As of 2012, one rural locality in Kursk Oblast bears this name:

- Baranovo, Kursk Oblast, a selo in Kunyevsky Selsoviet of Gorshechensky District

=== Leningrad Oblast ===
As of 2012, one rural locality in Leningrad Oblast bears this name:

- Baranovo, Leningrad Oblast, a village in Serebryanskoye Settlement Municipal Formation of Luzhsky District; 58°41′N 29°44′E

=== Lipetsk Oblast ===
As of 2012, one rural locality in Lipetsk Oblast bears this name:

- Baranovo, Lipetsk Oblast, a village in Afanasyevsky Selsoviet of Izmalkovsky District; 52°33′N 38°6′E

=== Moscow ===
As of 2012, one rural locality in Moscow bears this name:

- Baranovo, Moscow, a village in Pervomayskoye Settlement of Troitsky Administrative Okrug in the federal city of Moscow

=== Moscow Oblast ===
As of 2012, four rural localities in Moscow Oblast bear this name:

- Baranovo, Borisovskoye Rural Settlement, Mozhaysky District, Moscow Oblast, a village in Borisovskoye Rural Settlement of Mozhaysky District
- Baranovo, Yurlovskoye Rural Settlement, Mozhaysky District, Moscow Oblast, a village in Yurlovskoye Rural Settlement of Mozhaysky District
- Baranovo, Uvarovka, Mozhaysky District, Moscow Oblast, a village under the administrative jurisdiction of Uvarovka Work Settlement in Mozhaysky District
- Baranovo, Ruzsky District, Moscow Oblast, a village in Dorokhovskoye Rural Settlement of Ruzsky District

=== Nizhny Novgorod Oblast ===
As of 2012, two rural localities in Nizhny Novgorod Oblast bear this name:

- Baranovo, Sosnovsky District, Nizhny Novgorod Oblast, a selo in Yakovsky Selsoviet of Sosnovsky District
- Baranovo, Voskresensky District, Nizhny Novgorod Oblast, a village in Vladimirsky Selsoviet of Voskresensky District

=== Novgorod Oblast ===
As of 2012, three rural localities in Novgorod Oblast bear this name:

- Baranovo, Shimsky District, Novgorod Oblast, a village in Podgoshchskoye Settlement of Shimsky District
- Baranovo, Soletsky District, Novgorod Oblast, a village in Dubrovskoye Settlement of Soletsky District
- Baranovo, Starorussky District, Novgorod Oblast, a village in Velikoselskoye Settlement of Starorussky District

=== Oryol Oblast ===
As of 2012, two rural localities in Oryol Oblast bear this name:

- Baranovo, Livensky District, Oryol Oblast, a selo in Vakhnovsky Selsoviet of Livensky District
- Baranovo, Mtsensky District, Oryol Oblast, a village in Vysokinsky Selsoviet of Mtsensky District

=== Perm Krai ===
As of 2012, three rural localities in Perm Krai bear this name:

- Baranovo, Chernushinsky District, Perm Krai, a village in Chernushinsky District
- Baranovo, Kosinsky District, Perm Krai, a village in Kosinsky District
- Baranovo, Solikamsky District, Perm Krai, a settlement in Solikamsky District

=== Pskov Oblast ===
As of 2012, seven rural localities in Pskov Oblast bear this name:

- Baranovo, Krasnogorodsky District, Pskov Oblast, a village in Krasnogorodsky District
- Baranovo, Kunyinsky District, Pskov Oblast, a village in Kunyinsky District
- Baranovo, Nevelsky District, Pskov Oblast, a village in Nevelsky District
- Baranovo, Palkinsky District, Pskov Oblast, a village in Palkinsky District
- Baranovo, Porkhovsky District, Pskov Oblast, a village in Porkhovsky District
- Baranovo, Pskovsky District, Pskov Oblast, a village in Pskovsky District
- Baranovo, Pushkinogorsky District, Pskov Oblast, a village in Pushkinogorsky District

=== Ryazan Oblast ===
As of 2012, one rural locality in Ryazan Oblast bears this name:

- Baranovo, Ryazan Oblast, a village in Davydovsky Rural Okrug of Klepikovsky District

=== Smolensk Oblast ===
As of 2012, four rural localities in Smolensk Oblast bear this name:

- Baranovo, Dukhovshchinsky District, Smolensk Oblast, a village in Tretyakovskoye Rural Settlement of Dukhovshchinsky District
- Baranovo, Roslavlsky District, Smolensk Oblast, a village in Gryazenyatskoye Rural Settlement of Roslavlsky District
- Baranovo, Safonovsky District, Smolensk Oblast, a village in Baranovskoye Rural Settlement of Safonovsky District
- Baranovo, Vyazemsky District, Smolensk Oblast, a village in Khmelitskoye Rural Settlement of Vyazemsky District

=== Tomsk Oblast ===
As of 2012, one rural locality in Tomsk Oblast bears this name:

- Baranovo, Tomsk Oblast, a village in Krivosheinsky District

=== Tula Oblast ===
As of 2012, one rural locality in Tula Oblast bears this name:

- Baranovo, Tula Oblast, a village in Fedyashevskaya Rural Territory of Yasnogorsky District

=== Tver Oblast ===
As of 2012, four rural localities in Tver Oblast bear this name:

- Baranovo, Kashinsky District, Tver Oblast, a village in Karabuzinskoye Rural Settlement of Kashinsky District
- Baranovo, Ostashkovsky District, Tver Oblast, a village in Botovskoye Rural Settlement of Ostashkovsky District
- Baranovo, Torzhoksky District, Tver Oblast, a village in Bolshesvyattsovskoye Rural Settlement of Torzhoksky District
- Baranovo, Vesyegonsky District, Tver Oblast, a village in Ivanovskoye Rural Settlement of Vesyegonsky District

=== Vladimir Oblast ===
As of 2012, two rural localities in Vladimir Oblast bear this name:

- Baranovo, Gus-Khrustalny District, Vladimir Oblast, a village in Gus-Khrustalny District
- Baranovo, Kovrovsky District, Vladimir Oblast, a village in Kovrovsky District

=== Vologda Oblast ===
As of 2012, five rural localities in Vologda Oblast bear this name:

- Baranovo, Chagodoshchensky District, Vologda Oblast, a settlement in Borisovsky Selsoviet of Chagodoshchensky District
- Baranovo, Cherepovetsky District, Vologda Oblast, a village in Ilyinsky Selsoviet of Cherepovetsky District
- Baranovo, Kichmengsko-Gorodetsky District, Vologda Oblast, a village in Kichmengsky Selsoviet of Kichmengsko-Gorodetsky District
- Baranovo, Velikoustyugsky District, Vologda Oblast, a village in Teplogorsky Selsoviet of Velikoustyugsky District
- Baranovo, Vytegorsky District, Vologda Oblast, a village in Ankhimovsky Selsoviet of Vytegorsky District

=== Yaroslavl Oblast ===
As of 2012, four rural localities in Yaroslavl Oblast bear this name:

- Baranovo, Bolsheselsky District, Yaroslavl Oblast, a village in Blagoveshchensky Rural Okrug of Bolsheselsky District
- Baranovo, Nekrasovsky District, Yaroslavl Oblast, a village in Burmakinsky Rural Okrug of Nekrasovsky District
- Baranovo, Poshekhonsky District, Yaroslavl Oblast, a village in Pogorelsky Rural Okrug of Poshekhonsky District
- Baranovo, Rybinsky District, Yaroslavl Oblast, a village in Pogorelsky Rural Okrug of Rybinsky District

== Abolished localities ==
- Baranovo, Parfenyevsky District, Kostroma Oblast, a village in Zadorinsky Selsoviet of Parfenyevsky District in Kostroma Oblast; abolished on October 18, 2004

== Alternative names ==
- Baranovo, alternative name of Baranovka, a selo in Shcheglovskaya Rural Territory of Kemerovsky District in Kemerovo Oblast; 55°39′N 85°58′E
