= Demidovo =

Demidovo may refer to several localities in Russia:

- Demidovo, Perm Krai
- Demidovo, Gus-Khrustalny District, Vladimir Oblast
- Demidovo, Sobinsky District, Vladimir Oblast
- Demidovo, Cherepovetsky District, Vologda Oblast
- Demidovo, Sheksninsky District, Vologda Oblast
- Demidovo, Vashkinsky District, Vologda Oblast
- Demidovo, Velikoustyugsky District, Vologda Oblast
