= Novozhilovo =

Novozhilovo (Russian: Новожилово) is the name of three different rural localities in Russia:

- Novozhilovo, Leningrad Oblast, a village in Sosnovskoye Rural Settlement of Priozersky District, Leningrad Oblast
- Novozhilovo, Perm Krai, a village in Levichanskoye Rural Settlement of Kosinsky District, Perm Krai
- Novozhilovo, Vladimir Oblast, a village in Karinskoye Rural Settlement of Alexandrovsky District, Vladimir Oblast

== See also ==
- Novozhilov, a Russian last name
- Novozhilova, a rural locality in Kudymkarsky District, Perm Krai
