= Voyvyl =

Voyvyl Войвыл
- Village
- Location within Perm Krai Location within Russia
- Coordinates: 59°48′N 55°00′E
- Country: Russia
- Region: Perm Krai
- District: Kosinsky District
- Time zone: UTC+5:00

Voyvyl (Russian: Войвыл; Komi-Permyak: Вольвыл, Voľvyl) is a rural locality (a village) in Kosinskoye Rural Settlement, Kosinsky District, Perm Krai, Russia. The population was 47 as of 2010. There are 3 streets.

== Geography ==
Voyvyl is located 17 km south of Kosa (the district's administrative centre) by road. Puksib is the nearest rural locality.
