= Ust-Kosa =

Ust-Kosa Усть-Коса
- Settlement
- Location within Perm Krai Location within Russia
- Coordinates: 60°12′N 55°10′E
- Country: Russia
- Region: Perm Krai
- District: Kosinsky District
- Time zone: UTC+5:00

Ust-Kosa (Russian: Усть-Коса; Komi-Permyak: Усь Кӧсва, Uś Kösva) is a rural locality (a settlement) in Svetlichanskoye Rural Settlement, Kosinsky District, Perm Krai, Russia. The population was 137 as of 2010. There are 3 streets.

== Geography ==
Ust-Kosa is located 99 km northeast of Kosa (the district's administrative centre) by road. Novaya Svetlitsa is the nearest rural locality.
