= Verkh-Lel =

Verkh-Lel Верх-Лель
- Settlement
- Location within Perm Krai Location within Russia
- Coordinates: 59°58′N 54°49′E
- Country: Russia
- Region: Perm Krai
- District: Kosinsky District
- Time zone: UTC+5:00

Verkh-Lel (Russian: Верх-Лель; Komi-Permyak: Вылісь Лёль, Vylïś Ľoľ) is a rural locality (a settlement) in Chazyovskoye Rural Settlement, Kosinsky District, Perm Krai, Russia. The population was 117 as of 2010. There are 5 streets.

== Geography ==
Verkh-Lel is located 25 km northwest of Kosa (the district's administrative centre) by road. Sosnovka is the nearest rural locality.
