= Chazyovo =

Chazyovo Чазёво
- Village
- Location within Perm Krai Location within Russia
- Coordinates: 59°53′N 54°32′E
- Country: Russia
- Region: Perm Krai
- District: Kosinsky District
- Time zone: UTC+5:00

Chazyovo (Russian: Чазёво; Komi-Permyak: Чадзӧв, Ćadzöv) is a rural locality (a village) and the administrative center of Chazyovskoye Rural Settlement, Kosinsky District, Perm Krai, Russia. The population was 268 as of 2010. There are 5 streets.

== Geography ==
Chazyovo is located 28 km southwest of Kosa (the district's administrative centre) by road. Podyachevo is the nearest rural locality.
