= Puksib =

Puksib Пуксиб
- Selo
- Location within Perm Krai Location within Russia
- Coordinates: 59°46′N 55°01′E
- Country: Russia
- Region: Perm Krai
- District: Kosinsky District
- Time zone: UTC+5:00

Puksib (Russian: Пуксиб; Komi-Permyak: Пуксипи, Puksipi) is a rural locality (a selo) in Kosinskoye Rural Settlement, Kosinsky District, Perm Krai, Russia. The population was 354 as of 2010. There are 6 streets.

== Geography ==
Puksib is located 21 km south of Kosa (the district's administrative centre) by road. Voyvyl is the nearest rural locality.
