= Novaya Svetlitsa =

Novaya Svetlitsa Новая Светлица
- Settlement
- Location within Perm Krai Location within Russia
- Coordinates: 60°12′N 55°16′E
- Country: Russia
- Region: Perm Krai
- District: Kosinsky District
- Time zone: UTC+5:00

Novaya Svetlitsa (Russian: Новая Светлица; Komi-Permyak: Виль Светлича, Viľ Svetlića) is a rural locality (a settlement) and the administrative center of Svetlichanskoye Rural Settlement, Kosinsky District, Perm Krai, Russia. The population was 333 as of 2010. There are 10 streets.

== Geography ==
Novaya Svetlitsa is located 90 km northeast of Kosa (the district's administrative centre) by road.
