= Nizhnyaya Kosa =

Nizhnyaya Kosa Нижняя Коса
- Village
- Location within Perm Krai Location within Russia
- Coordinates: 60°00′N 54°58′E
- Country: Russia
- Region: Perm Krai
- District: Kosinsky District
- Time zone: UTC+5:00

Nizhnyaya Kosa (Russian: Нижняя Коса; Komi-Permyak: Улісь Кӧс, Ulïś Kös) is a rural locality (a village) in Kosinskoye Rural Settlement, Kosinsky District, Perm Krai, Russia. The population was 91 as of 2010. There are 4 streets.

== Geography ==
Nizhnyaya Kosa is located 8 km north of Kosa (the district's administrative centre) by road. Kosa is the nearest rural locality.
