= Poroshevo =

Poroshevo Порошево
- Village
- Location within Perm Krai Location within Russia
- Coordinates: 60°07′N 54°53′E
- Country: Russia
- Region: Perm Krai
- District: Kosinsky District
- Time zone: UTC+5:00

Poroshevo (Russian: Порошево; Komi-Permyak: Порошволь, Porošvoľ) is a rural locality (a village) in Kosinskoye Rural Settlement, Kosinsky District, Perm Krai, Russia. The population was 102 as of 2010. There are 4 streets.

== Geography ==
Poroshevo is located 24 km north of Kosa (the district's administrative centre) by road. Mys is the nearest rural locality.
