= Bachmanovo =

Bachmanovo Бачманово
- Village
- Location within Perm Krai Location within Russia
- Coordinates: 59°51′N 54°38′E
- Country: Russia
- Region: Perm Krai
- District: Kosinsky District
- Time zone: UTC+5:00

Bachmanovo (Russian: Бачманово; Komi-Permyak: Бачманӧв, Baćmanöv) is a rural locality (a village) and the administrative center of Chazyovskoye Rural Settlement, Kosinsky District, Perm Krai, Russia. The population was 124 as of 2010. There are 4 streets.

== Geography ==
Bachmanovo is located 27 km southwest of Kosa (the district's administrative centre) by road. Sredneye Bachmanovo is the nearest rural locality.
