= Nesoli =

Nesoli Несоли
- Village
- Location within Perm Krai Location within Russia
- Coordinates: 60°06′N 54°52′E
- Country: Russia
- Region: Perm Krai
- District: Kosinsky District
- Time zone: UTC+5:00

Nesoli (Russian: Несоли; Komi-Permyak: Несӧль, Nesöľ) is a rural locality (a village) in Kosinskoye Rural Settlement, Kosinsky District, Perm Krai, Russia. The population was 43 as of 2010. There are 3 streets.

== Geography ==
Nesoli is located 25 km north of Kosa (the district's administrative centre) by road. Poroshevo is the nearest rural locality.
