= Levichi =

Levichi Левичи
- Village
- Location within Perm Krai Location within Russia
- Coordinates: 59°50′N 55°11′E
- Country: Russia
- Region: Perm Krai
- District: Kosinsky District
- Time zone: UTC+5:00

Levichi (Russian: Левичи) is a rural locality (a village) and the administrative center of Levichanskoye Rural Settlement, Kosinsky District, Perm Krai, Russia. The population was 216 as of 2010. There are 8 streets.

== Geography ==
Levichi is located 38 km southeast of Kosa (the district's administrative centre) by road. Krasnobay is the nearest rural locality.
