= Churaki =

Churaki Чураки
- Selo
- Location within Perm Krai Location within Russia
- Coordinates: 59°38′N 55°15′E
- Country: Russia
- Region: Perm Krai
- District: Kosinsky District
- Time zone: UTC+5:00

Churaki (Russian: Чураки) is a rural locality (a selo) in Levichanskoye Rural Settlement, Kosinsky District, Perm Krai, Russia. The population was 160 as of 2010. There are 6 streets.

== Geography ==
Churaki is located 48 km south of Kosa (the district's administrative centre) by road. Demidovo is the nearest rural locality.
