= Denino =

Denino Денино
- Village
- Location within Perm Krai Location within Russia
- Coordinates: 59°41′N 55°12′E
- Country: Russia
- Region: Perm Krai
- District: Kosinsky District
- Time zone: UTC+5:00

Denino (Russian: Денино) is a rural locality (a village) in Levichanskoye Rural Settlement, Kosinsky District, Perm Krai, Russia. The population was 34 as of 2010. There is 1 street.

== Geography ==
Denino is located 41 km south of Kosa (the district's administrative centre) by road. Novozhilovo is the nearest rural locality.
