= Maskali =

Maskali Маскали
- Village
- Location within Perm Krai Location within Russia
- Coordinates: 60°05′N 54°55′E
- Country: Russia
- Region: Perm Krai
- District: Kosinsky District
- Time zone: UTC+5:00

Maskali (Russian: Маскали) is a rural locality (a village) in Kosinskoye Rural Settlement, Kosinsky District, Perm Krai, Russia. The population was 116 as of 2010.

== Geography ==
Maskali is located 20 km north of Kosa (the district's administrative centre) by road. Mys is the nearest rural locality.
