= Lyampino =

Lyampino Лямпино
- Village
- Location within Perm Krai Location within Russia
- Coordinates: 59°37′N 55°12′E
- Country: Russia
- Region: Perm Krai
- District: Kosinsky District
- Time zone: UTC+5:00

Lyampino (Russian: Лямпино) is a rural locality (a village) in Levichanskoye Rural Settlement, Kosinsky District, Perm Krai, Russia. The population was 29 as of 2010. There is 1 street.

== Geography ==
Lyampino is located 51 km south of Kosa (the district's administrative centre) by road. Zinkovo is the nearest rural locality.
