= Gavrikovo =

Gavrikovo Гавриково
- Village
- Location within Perm Krai Location within Russia
- Coordinates: 60°12′N 54°47′E
- Country: Russia
- Region: Perm Krai
- District: Kosinsky District
- Time zone: UTC+5:00

Gavrikovo (Russian: Гавриково) is a rural locality (a village) in Kosinskoye Rural Settlement, Kosinsky District, Perm Krai, Russia. The population was 12 as of 2010. There is 1 street.

== Geography ==
Gavrikovo is located 37 km north of Kosa (the district's administrative centre) by road. Pyatigory is the nearest rural locality.
