= Chirkovo =

Chirkovo Чирково
- Village
- Location within Perm Krai Location within Russia
- Coordinates: 59°51′N 54°59′E
- Country: Russia
- Region: Perm Krai
- District: Kosinsky District
- Time zone: UTC+5:00

Chirkovo (Russian: Чирково) is a rural locality (a village) in Kosinskoye Rural Settlement, Kosinsky District, Perm Krai, Russia. The population was 80 as of 2010. There are 3 streets.

== Geography ==
Chirkovo is located 10 km south of Kosa (the district's administrative centre) by road. Staroye Gushchino is the nearest rural locality.
