= Belorechensky, Russia =

Belorechensky (Russian: Белоре́ченский; masculine), Belorechenskaya (Белоре́ченская; feminine), or Belorechenskoye (Белоре́ченское; neuter) is the name of several inhabited localities in Russia.

Urban localities

- Belorechensky, Irkutsk Oblast, a work settlement in Usolsky District of Irkutsk Oblast

Rural localities

- Belorechensky, Arkhangelsk Oblast, a settlement in Dvinskoy Selsoviet of Verkhnetoyemsky District of Arkhangelsk Oblast
- Belorechensky, Ryazan Oblast, a settlement in Zanino-Pochinkovsky Rural Okrug of Shilovsky District of Ryazan Oblast
- Belorechensky, Stavropol Krai, a settlement under the administrative jurisdiction of the city of krai significance of Kislovodsk, Stavropol Krai
- Belorechensky, Sverdlovsk Oblast, a settlement in Beloyarsky District of Sverdlovsk Oblast
- Belorechensky, Volgograd Oblast, a settlement in Krasnoarmeysky Selsoviet of Novonikolayevsky District of Volgograd Oblast
- Belorechensky, Voronezh Oblast, a khutor in Bolshedmitrovskoye Rural Settlement of Podgorensky District of Voronezh Oblast
