= Novoye Gushchino =

Novoye Gushchino Новое Гущино
- Village
- Location within Perm Krai Location within Russia
- Coordinates: 59°54′N 54°59′E
- Country: Russia
- Region: Perm Krai
- District: Kosinsky District
- Time zone: UTC+5:00

Novoye Gushchino (Russian: Новое Гущино) is a rural locality (a village) in Kosinskoye Rural Settlement, Kosinsky District, Perm Krai, Russia. The population was 4 as of 2010. There is 1 street.

== Geography ==
Novoye Gushchino is located 5 km south of Kosa (the district's administrative centre) by road. Staroye Gushchino is the nearest rural locality.
