= Podgora, Kosinsky District, Perm Krai =

Podgora Подгора
- Village
- Location within Perm Krai Location within Russia
- Coordinates: 60°12′N 54°46′E
- Country: Russia
- Region: Perm Krai
- District: Kosinsky District
- Time zone: UTC+5:00

Podgora (Russian: Подгора) is a rural locality (a village) in Kosinskoye Rural Settlement, Kosinsky District, Perm Krai, Russia. The population was 51 as of 2010. There are 2 streets.

== Geography ==
Podgora is located 38 km north of Kosa (the district's administrative centre) by road. Pyatigory is the nearest rural locality.
