= Solym =

Solym Солым
- Settlement
- Location within Perm Krai Location within Russia
- Coordinates: 60°07′N 55°08′E
- Country: Russia
- Region: Perm Krai
- District: Kosinsky District
- Time zone: UTC+5:00

Solym (Russian: Солым) is a rural locality (a settlement) in Svetlichanskoye Rural Settlement, Kosinsky District, Perm Krai, Russia. The population was 187 as of 2010. There are 3 streets.

== Geography ==
Solym is located 30 km north of Kosa (the district's administrative centre) by road. Ust-Kosa is the nearest rural locality.
