= Loch-Say =

Loch-Say Лочь-Сай
- Settlement
- Location within Perm Krai Location within Russia
- Coordinates: 59°58′N 55°18′E
- Country: Russia
- Region: Perm Krai
- District: Kosinsky District
- Time zone: UTC+5:00

Loch-Say (Russian: Лочь-Сай) is a rural locality (a settlement) in Levichanskoye Rural Settlement, Kosinsky District, Perm Krai, Russia. The population was 100 as of 2010. There are 4 streets.

== Geography ==
Loch-Say is located 59 km east of Kosa (the district's administrative centre) by road. Selishche is the nearest rural locality.
