= Gorki, Kosinsky District, Perm Krai =

Gorki Горки
- Settlement
- Location within Perm Krai Location within Russia
- Coordinates: 59°50′N 55°07′E
- Country: Russia
- Region: Perm Krai
- District: Kosinsky District
- Time zone: UTC+5:00

Gorki (Russian: Горки) is a rural locality (a settlement) in Levichanskoye Rural Settlement, Kosinsky District, Perm Krai, Russia. The population was 144 in 2010. There are six streets.

== Geography ==
Gorki is located 27 km southeast of Kosa (the district's administrative centre) by road. Levichi is the nearest rural locality.
