= Belorechenskoye Urban Settlement =

Belorechenskoye Urban Settlement is the name of several municipal formations in Russia.

- Belorechenskoye Urban Settlement, a municipal formation incorporating the work settlement of Belorechensky and the selo of Malta in Usolsky District of Irkutsk Oblast
- Belorechenskoye Urban Settlement, a municipal formation within Belorechensky Municipal District of Krasnodar Krai, incorporating the town of Belorechensk

== See also ==
- Belorechensky (disambiguation)
