= Peklayb =

Peklayb Пеклаыб
- Village
- Location within Perm Krai Location within Russia
- Coordinates: 59°54′N 54°26′E
- Country: Russia
- Region: Perm Krai
- District: Kosinsky District
- Time zone: UTC+5:00

Peklayb (Russian: Пеклаыб) is a rural locality (a village) in Chazyovskoye Rural Settlement, Kosinsky District, Perm Krai, Russia. The population was 14 as of 2010. There are 3 streets.

== Geography ==
Peklayb is located 37 km west of Kosa (the district's administrative centre) by road. Karchey is the nearest rural locality.
