= Kirshino =

Kirshino Киршино
- Village
- Location within Perm Krai Location within Russia
- Coordinates: 59°38′N 55°12′E
- Country: Russia
- Region: Perm Krai
- District: Kosinsky District
- Time zone: UTC+5:00

Kirshino (Russian: Киршино) is a rural locality (a village) in Levichanskoye Rural Settlement, Kosinsky District, Perm Krai, Russia. The population was 9 as of 2010. There is 1 street.

== Geography ==
Kirshino is located 52 km south of Kosa (the district's administrative centre) by road. Lyampino is the nearest rural locality.
