= Grishkino =

Grishkino Гришкино
- Village
- Location within Perm Krai Location within Russia
- Coordinates: 59°43′N 55°16′E
- Country: Russia
- Region: Perm Krai
- District: Kosinsky District
- Time zone: UTC+5:00

Grishkino (Russian: Гришкино) is a rural locality (a village) in Levichanskoye Rural Settlement, Kosinsky District, Perm Krai, Russia. The population was 3 as of 2010. There is 1 street.

== Geography ==
Grishkino is located 35 km southeast of Kosa (the district's administrative centre) by road. Novozhilovo is the nearest rural locality.
