= Sredneye Bachmanovo =

Sredneye Bachmanovo Среднее Бачманово
- Village
- Location within Perm Krai Location within Russia
- Coordinates: 59°51′N 54°38′E
- Country: Russia
- Region: Perm Krai
- District: Kosinsky District
- Time zone: UTC+5:00

Sredneye Bachmanovo (Russian: Среднее Бачманово; Komi-Permyak: Чоййыл, Ćojjyl, or Шöрöт Бачман, Šöröt Baćman) is a rural locality (a village) in Chazyovskoye Rural Settlement, Kosinsky District, Perm Krai, Russia. The population was 21 as of 2010. There is 1 street.

== Geography ==
Sredneye Bachmanovo is located 26 km southwest of Kosa (the district's administrative centre) by road. Bachmanovo is the nearest rural locality.
