= Karchyoy =

Karchyoy Карчёй
- Village
- Location within Perm Krai Location within Russia
- Coordinates: 59°55′N 54°28′E
- Country: Russia
- Region: Perm Krai
- District: Kosinsky District
- Time zone: UTC+5:00

Karchyoy (Russian: Карчёй) is a rural locality (a village) in Chazyovskoye Rural Settlement, Kosinsky District, Perm Krai, Russia. The population was 11 as of 2010. There is 1 street.

== Geography ==
Karchyoy is located 39 km west of Kosa (the district's administrative centre) by road. Peklayb is the nearest rural locality.
