= Krasnobay =

Krasnobay Краснобай
- Village
- Location within Perm Krai Location within Russia
- Coordinates: 59°50′N 55°11′E
- Country: Russia
- Region: Perm Krai
- District: Kosinsky District
- Time zone: UTC+5:00

Krasnobay (Russian: Краснобай) is a rural locality (a village) in Levichanskoye Rural Settlement, Kosinsky District, Perm Krai, Russia. The population was 14 as of 2010. There is 1 street.

== Geography ==
Krasnobay is located 37 km southeast of Kosa (the district's administrative centre) by road. Levichi is the nearest rural locality.
