= Odan =

Odan Одань
- Settlement
- Location within Perm Krai Location within Russia
- Coordinates: 60°04′N 55°07′E
- Country: Russia
- Region: Perm Krai
- District: Kosinsky District
- Time zone: UTC+5:00

Odan (Russian: Одань) is a rural locality (a settlement) in Svetlichanskoye Rural Settlement, Kosinsky District, Perm Krai, Russia. The population was 2 as of 2010. There is 1 street.

== Geography ==
Odan is located 25 km northeast of Kosa (the district's administrative centre) by road. Solym is the nearest rural locality.
