= Varysh =

Varysh Варыш
- Village
- Location within Perm Krai Location within Russia
- Coordinates: 59°43′N 54°56′E
- Country: Russia
- Region: Perm Krai
- District: Kosinsky District
- Time zone: UTC+5:00

Varysh (Russian: Варыш) is a rural locality (a village) in Kosinskoye Rural Settlement, Kosinsky District, Perm Krai, Russia. The population was 11 as of 2010. There is 1 street.

== Geography ==
Varysh is located 28 km south of Kosa (the district's administrative centre) by road. Maraty is the nearest rural locality.
