= Rogov =

Rogov (Russian: Рогов) and Rogova (Russian: Рогова; feminine) is a common Russian and Jewish surname. Notable people with the surname include:

- Aleksandr Rogov (1956–2004), Soviet flatwater canoer
- Aleksandr Rogov (footballer) (born 1986), Russian footballer
- Aleksey Rogov (footballer) (born 1991), Russian footballer
- Daniel Rogov (1935–2011), Israeli food and wine critic
- Evgeni Rogov (1929–1996), Russian footballer
- Igor Rogov (born 1950), Kazakhstani politician
- Ivan Rogov (1899–1949), Soviet political and military officer
- Maksim Rogov (born 1986), Russian footballer
- Natalia Rogova (born 1995), Russian badminton player
- Nikolai Rogov (1825–1905), Russian ethnographer and philologist
- Oksana Rogova (born 1978), Russian triple jumper
- Sergey Rogov (1948–2025), Russian political scientist
- Vladimir Rogov (born 1976), Ukrainian-born Russian politician

== See also ==
- Rogoff
