= Gortlud =

Gortlud Гортлуд
- Village
- Location within Perm Krai Location within Russia
- Coordinates: 59°50′N 54°36′E
- Country: Russia
- Region: Perm Krai
- District: Kosinsky District
- Time zone: UTC+5:00

Gortlud (Russian: Гортлуд) is a rural locality (a village) in Chazyovskoye Rural Settlement, Kosinsky District, Perm Krai, Russia. The population was 63 as of 2010. There is 1 street.

== Geography ==
Gortlud is located 29 km southwest of Kosa (the district's administrative centre) by road. Bachmanovo is the nearest rural locality.
