= Novozhilov =

Novozhilov (Russian: Новожилов) is a Russian masculine surname, its feminine counterpart is Novozhilova (Russian: Новожилова). It may refer to:

- Genrikh Novozhilov (1925–2019), Soviet and Russian aircraft designer
- Nestor Ivanovich Novozhilov, Soviet palaeontologist
- Viktor Novozhilov (wrestler) (1950–1991), Soviet and Russian Olympic wrestler
- Viktor Valentinovich Novozhilov (1892–1970), Soviet economist and mathematician
- Viktor Novozhilov (general) (born 1939), Soviet and Russian army officer
- Viktor Novozhilov (politician) (born 1965), Russian politician

== See also ==
- Novozhilova, a rural locality in Kudymkarsky District, Perm Krai
- Novozhilovo, name of three localities in Russia
