= Baranovo, Kosinsky District, Perm Krai =

Baranovo Бараново
- Village
- Location within Perm Krai Location within Russia
- Coordinates: 60°10′N 54°49′E
- Country: Russia
- Region: Perm Krai
- District: Kosinsky District
- Time zone: UTC+5:00

Baranovo (Russian: Бараново) is a rural locality (a village) in Kosinskoye Rural Settlement, Kosinsky District, Perm Krai, Russia. The population was 5 as of 2010. There is 1 street.

== Geography ==
Baranovo is located 32 km north of Kosa (the district's administrative centre) by road. Panino is the nearest rural locality.
