= Novozhilovo, Perm Krai =

Novozhilovo Новожилово
- Village
- Location within Perm Krai Location within Russia
- Coordinates: 59°43′N 55°15′E
- Country: Russia
- Region: Perm Krai
- District: Kosinsky District
- Time zone: UTC+5:00

Novozhilovo (Russian: Новожилово) is a rural locality (a village) in Levichanskoye Rural Settlement, Kosinsky District, Perm Krai, Russia. The population was 5 as of 2010. There is 1 street.

== Geography ==
Novozhilovo is located 35 km southeast of Kosa (the district's administrative centre) by road. Grishkino is the nearest rural locality.
