= Belorechensky =

Belorechensky (masculine), Belorechenskaya (feminine), or Belorechenskoye (neuter) may refer to:

- Belorechensky District, a district of Krasnodar Krai, Russia
- Belorechenskoye Urban Settlement, several municipal urban settlements in Russia
- Belorechensky, Russia (Belorechenskaya, Belorechenskoye), several inhabited localities in Russia
- Bilorichenskyi (Belorechensky), an urban-type settlement in Luhansk Oblast, Ukraine
- Belorechenskaya railway station, a railway station on the North Caucasus Railway, Russia
- Belorechenskaya Hydroelectric Station, a power station in Russia
- Bilorichenska coal mine (Belorechenskaya coal mine), a coal mine in Ukraine
