= Komi-Yazva language =

Uralic language spoken in Russia

Komi-Yodz
- коми-ёдз көл komi-jodz kål
- Native to: Russia
- Region: Perm Krai
- Ethnicity: (undated figure of 4,000 Yazva Komi)
- Native speakers: 200 (2007)
- Language family: Uralic: Permic; Komi; Komi-Yodz

Language codes
- ISO 639-3: –
- Glottolog: komi1277
- ELP: Yazva
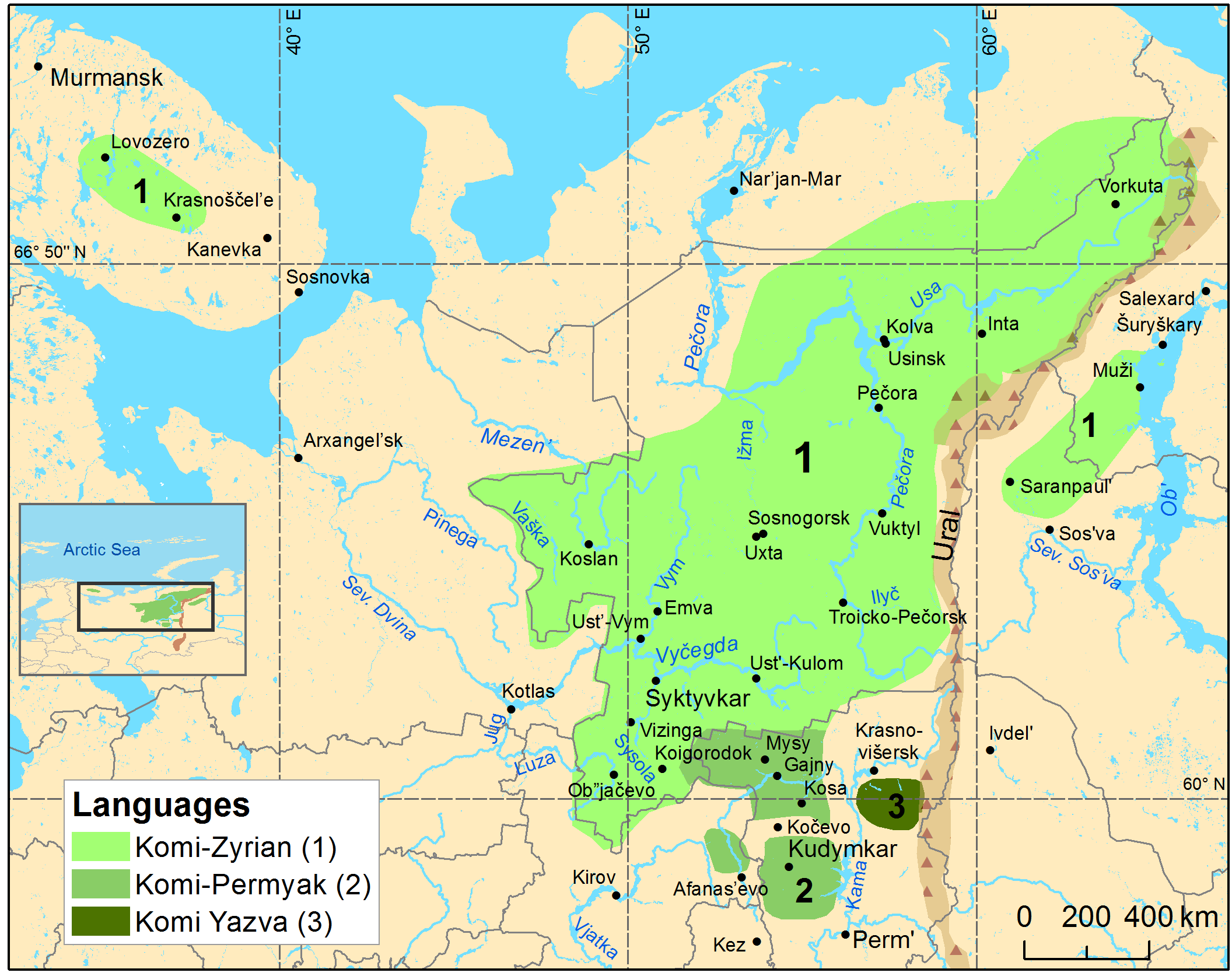
- Traditional distribution of the Komi languages

- Yazva Komi is classified as Severely Endangered by the UNESCO Atlas of the World's Languages in Danger (2010)

The Komi-Yazva language (коми-ёдз көл, komi-jodz kål) is a Permic language closely related to Komi-Zyrian and Permyak, native to and spoken mostly in Krasnovishersky District of Perm Krai in Russia, in the basin of the Yazva (Yodz) River. It has no official status. It is the most divergent of all the Komi varieties. About two thousand speakers densely live in Krasnovishersky District.

== Studies ==
Availability of the particular vowels together with features of phonetics and stress system led Finnish linguist Arvid Genetz in 1889 to consider Komi-Yazva as a separate dialect. Later, this decision was confirmed by the famous Finno-Ugricist Vasily Lytkin, who studied the Komi-Yazva idiom in depth from 1949 until 1953. Some researchers consider it to be a dialect of the Komi-Permyak language.

Map of Perm Krai. Komi-Yazva is to the east (in dark blue)

== Geographical distribution ==
In the early 1960s, about 2,000 speakers lived compactly on the territory of Krasnovishersky District of Perm Krai (Antipinskaya, Parshakovskaya, Bychinskaya and Verkh-Yazvinskaya village administrations). In total, there were about 3,000 language-speakers.

== Alphabet ==
The first Komi-Yazva primer was printed in 2003. Its author was the teacher of the Parshavskaya school A. L. Parshakova. This book also became the first one ever printed in Komi-Yazva language.

А а	Б б	В в	Г г	Д д	Е е	Ё ё	Ж ж
З з	И и	Й й	К к	Л л	М м	Н н	О о
Ө ө	Ӧ ӧ	П п	Р р	С с	Т т	У у	Ӱ ӱ
Ф ф	Х х	Ц ц	Ч ч	Ш ш	Щ щ	Ъ ъ	Ы ы
Ь ь	Э э	Ю ю	Я я

== See also ==
- Komi peoples
- Komi-Permyak language
- Permians

== Bibliography ==
- Hausenberg, Annu-Reet (1998). "Komi". In Abondolo, Daniel (ed.). The Uralic languages. Routledge. pp. 305–326. ISBN 0-415-08198-X.
- Лыткин В. И., Тепляшина Т. И. Пермские языки // Основы финно-угорского языкознания / ИЯ АН СССР. — Т.3. — М.: Наука, 1976.
  - = Lytkin, V. I.; Teplyashina, T. I. "Permic languages". The Fundamentals of Fenno-Ugric linguistics. (The Academy of Sciences of the USSR.) Vol. 3. Moscow: Nauka, 1976.
- Лыткин В. И. Коми-язьвинский диалект. — М.: Издательсвто АН СССР, 1961.
  - = Lytkin, V. I. (ed.) The Komi-Yazva dialect. Moscow, 1961.
- Коми-пермяцкий язык / Под ред. проф. В. И. Лыткина. — Кудымкар: Коми-пермяцкое книжное издательство, 1962.
  - = Lytkin, V. I. (ed.) The Komi-Permyak language. Kudymkar, 1962.
- Паршакова А. Л. Коми-язьвинский букварь. Пермь, 2003.
  - = Parshakova, A. L. Komi-Yazva primer. Perm, 2003.
