= Rogoff =

Rogoff is a surname based on an alternate spelling of Rogov.

The name Rogoff is identified as Jewish (from Lithuania and Belarus). It is a westernized form of Rogov, a habitational name from Raguva near Kaunas in Lithuania (Russian name Rogovo).

Notable people with the surname include:

- Alice Rogoff (born 1951), American publisher and philanthropist
- Barbara Rogoff, American academic
- Irit Rogoff (born 1947), academic
- Kenneth Rogoff (born 1953), American economist and chess grandmaster
- Roger Rogoff, appointed U.S. attorney at United States District Court for the Western District of Washington
- Lynn Rogoff, American film and television producer
- Mortimer Rogoff, American inventor and businessman

== See also ==
- Rogov
