= Nikolai Rogov =

Russian ethnographer, researcher, author and philologist

Nikolai Abramovich Rogov
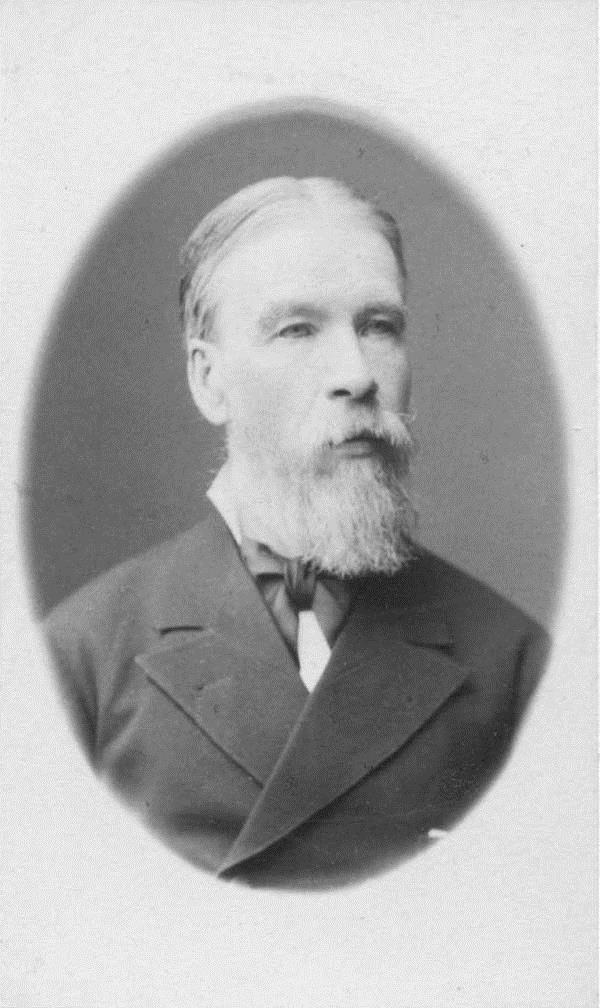
- Born: 1825; Sredne-Yegvinskoye, Russia
- Died: 5 August 1905 (aged 79–80)
- Occupations: ethnographer and philologist
- Known for: research of Komi-Permyak language

Nikolai Abramovich Rogov (Russian: Никола́й Абра́мович Ро́гов, 1825 — 5 August 1905) was a Russian ethnographer and philologist, a researcher of Komi-Permyak language. He is known as the author of the first and one of the most complete dictionaries of that language. The dictionary contains about 13,000 words.

Nikolai Rogov was born in 1825 in Sredne-Yegvinskoye settlement of Perm Governorate in serf family. He studied in the Saint-Petersburg School of Agriculture, Mining and Metallurgical Sciences. Since 1850 he worked as a forester in Stroganovs' estate. Later he was appointed manager of Kyn Factory (Кыновский завод) in Kungursky Uyezd (Кунгурский уезд). There, in 1864, he established Kyn Co-operative Society, the first private co-operative society in Russia.

Since 1849 Rogov worked on the creation of "Permyak-Russian and Russian-Permyak Dictionary", which was published in Saint-Petersburg in 1869. The dictionary included about 13,000 words of Inva and Nerdva dialects of Komi-Permyak language. In 2007 the dictionary was republished by Komy-Permyak Publishing House.

A historian Aleksandr Dmitriyev (Александр Дмитриев) in "Old times of Perm" reported about Rogov as follows:

We have told already, how great importance are philological works of N. A. Rogov about Permyaks, i. e. his Permyak grammatics and dictionary. The best ethnographic essay on Permyaks named "Materials for describing the everyday life of Permyaks" also belongs to him. Other writers did frequently derive from him.

Nikolai Rogov died on 5 August 1905.

== Publications ==
- Experience of Grammatics of Permyak language. — Saint-Petersburg, 1860.
- Permyak-Russian and Russian-Permyak Dictionary. — Saint-Petersburg, 1869.
- a number of articles in Perm Governorate News (Пермские губернские ведомости).
