= Permic languages =

Language group

Permic
- Geographic distribution: foothills of the Ural Mountains in Russia
- Ethnicity: Permians
- Linguistic classification: Uralic: Permic
- Subdivisions: Komi; Udmurt; ?Meshchera †

Language codes
- Glottolog: perm1256
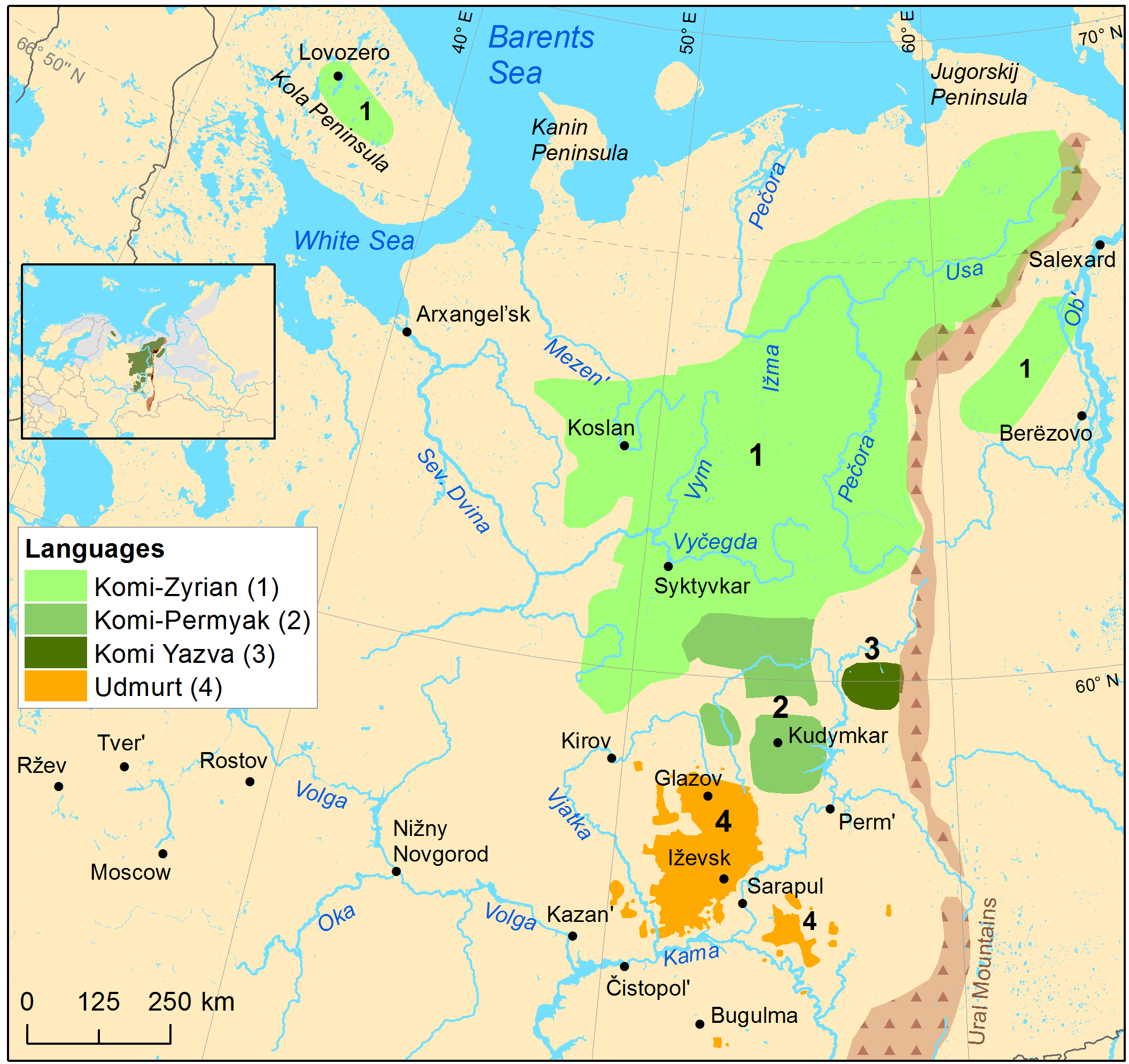
- Distribution of the Permic languages at the beginning of the 20th century

The Permic or Permian languages are a branch of the Uralic language family. They are spoken in several regions to the west of the Ural Mountains within the Russian Federation. The total number of speakers is around 950,000, of which around 550,000 speak the most widely spoken language, Udmurt. Like other Uralic languages, the Permic languages are primarily agglutinative and have a rich system of grammatical cases. Unlike many other agglutinative languages, they do not have vowel harmony.

The earliest Permic language to be preserved in writing was Old Permic or Old Zyryan, in the 14th century.

== Classification ==
The extant Permic languages are:

- Udmurt (Votyak)
- Komi (Zyryan)
- Permyak (Komi-Permyak)
- Yazva (Komi-Yazva)

The Permic languages have traditionally been classified as Finno-Permic languages, along with the Finnic, Saami, Mordvin, and Mari languages. The Finno-Permic and Ugric languages together made up the Finno-Ugric family. However, this taxonomy has more recently been called into question, and the relationship of the Permic languages to other Uralic languages remains uncertain.

The Meshchera language may have been a Permic enclave around the Volga river, as some toponymic data seems to closely align with Udmurt.

== History ==
The word Permian can be traced back philologically to the Russian word Perem’ (Перемь) or Perm’ (Пермь) which is found in medieval Russian chronicles. The word was initially used to designate certain territories, including the lower reaches of the Dvina River, as well as the area bounded by the Pechora, Vychegda and Kama rivers in the north, west and south, and the Urals in the east, which was incorporated into the Russian state in the late 15th century. The word Permian was then used to designate the non-Russian peoples who lived in there, which mostly included the Zyrians, and the Russians later began using the appellation Zyrian. From the 19th century, the word Permian was used in scholarly writing to designate the Zyrians and the Udmurts.

== Phonology ==
Proto-Uralic word roots have been subject to particularly heavy reduction in the Permic languages.

- Original geminates *pp, *tt, *kk were reduced to single voiceless stops *p, *t, *k.
- Between vowels, original single *p, *t, *k as well as *w and *x were lost entirely.
- Second-syllable vowels were lost entirely. This was obscured in Udmurt by adding -ы to certain words. (PU *lumi "snow" → Udm лымы /lɯˈmɯ/ vs PU *lämi "broth" → Udm лым /lɯm/).
- The sibilants *s, *ś, *š have remained distinct from each other in all positions, but were voiced to *z, *ž, *ź [z ʒ ʑ] between voiced sounds.
- Consonant clusters were largely simplified: in particular nasal + stop/affricate clusters yield voiced stops/affricates, and stop + sibilant clusters yield voiceless sibilants.

A peculiarity of Permic is the occurrence of the voiced consonants such as *b, *g word-initially even in inherited vocabulary, apparently a development from original PU voiceless consonants.

The Proto-Permic consonant inventory is reconstructed as:

		Labial	Alveolar	Palatal	Velar
Nasal		m	n	ɲ	ŋ
Plosive	voiceless	p	t	c	k
Plosive	voiced	b	d	ɟ	ɡ
Affricate	voiceless		t͡ʃ	t͡ɕ	
Affricate	voiced		d͡ʒ	d͡ʑ	
Fricative	voiceless		s, ʃ	ɕ	
Fricative	voiced		z, ʒ	ʑ	
Approximant		w, ʋ	l	j, ʎ	
Trill			r		

This inventory is retained nearly unchanged in the modern-day Permic languages.

Komi has merged original *w into /ʋ/ and undergone a word-final a change *l → /ʋ/ ~ /w/ in many dialects, while Udmurt has changed word-initially *r → /d͡ʒ/ or /d͡ʑ/. *ŋ is retained only in some Udmurt dialects; in other Permic varieties it has become /m/ next to back vowels, /n/ next to central vowels, /ɲ/ next to front vowels.

In later Russian loanwords, the consonants /f x t͡s/ may occur.

The consonant *w was marginal and occurred only word-initially or after a word-initial *k, generally traceable to diphthongization of the close back vowel of the 2nd series. An exceptional word is the numeral "six", *kwatʲ, which in Komi is the only native word root with an initial cluster.

Literary Komi and literary Udmurt both possess a seven-vowel system /i ɯ u e ə o a/. These are however not related straightforwardly, and numerous additional vowels are required for Proto-Permic, perhaps as many as 15 altogether. The reconstruction of Proto-Permic vocalism and its development from Proto-Uralic has always been a puzzling topic, for which there are several models. There is general agreement on the existence of two series of close vowels, one of which results in modern /i ɯ u/ in literary Udmurt and literary Komi-Zyryan, the other in correspondences of Udmurt /e ɯ u/ to Komi /e ə o/ (but /i ʉ u/ in the Komi-Yazva language). Proposed distinguishing factors for these include length (*u, *uː), tenseness (*ʊ, *u) and height (*u, *o).

Here is the vowel table used in Wiktionary:

Proto-Permic vowels
	Front		Central		Back	
	unrounded	rounded	unrounded	rounded	unrounded	rounded
Close	i	ü		u̇		u
Close-Mid	e	ö		ȯ		o
Mid						
Open-Mid	ɛ	ɔ̈		ɔ̇		ɔ
Open	ä				a	å

Vowel correspondences in Permic languages (word-initial syllable)
Proto-Permic	Old Komi	Komi-Zyrian	Komi-Permyak	Komi-Yazva	Udmurt	Finnic	notes
*a	𐍐	а	а	a	а	*a, *ä	
*å	𐍐	а	а	a	у	*a	
*ä	𐍩	ӧ	ӧ	ӧ	е	*ä, *e, *i	Dialectally, Udmurt *ä > ӧ
*ɔ	𐍩	о	о	о	у	*ä, *e, *i, *ö, *ü	
*o	𐍞	о	о	у	у	*a, *ë, *i, *o, *u	Udmurt *wo- > ва- Beserman *wo- > ўа- Irregularly, Udmurt *o > ы/и Irregularly, Beserman *o > ө
*ɛ	𐍔	е	е	е	о	*ä, *e, *i (*ö, *ü)	Next to palatals, Udmurt *ɛ > е Irregularly, Udmurt *ɛ > e
*e	𐍱	е	е	и	о	*ä, *e, *i (*ö, *ü)	Next to palatals, Udmurt *e > е Irregularly, Udmurt *e > e
*ɔ̇	𐍩	ӧ	ӧ	ӧ	о	*ä mainly	Before *l, Udmurt *ɔ̇ > а Irregularly, Udmurt *ɔ̇ > а
*ȯ	𐍩	ӧ	ӧ	ӱ	ӧ	*o, *u mainly	Udmurt unstressed *ȯ > ы Beserman unstressed *ȯ > ө
*ɔ̈	𐍩	ӧ	ӧ	ӧ	ӧ	*ö, *ü	Udmurt unstressed *ɔ̈ > у Irregularly, Komi *ɔ̈ > е
*ö	𐍞	о	о	у	у	*ä, e, i, ö, ü	Beserman *ö > ө
*u̇	𐍨	ы	ы	ө	ы	*u, *ü mainly	Beserman *u̇ > ө
*i	𐍙	и	и	и	и	*i, *e mainly	
*u	𐍣	у	у	у	у	*a, *o mainly	Irregularly, Udmurt *u > ы/и Irregularly, Beserman *u > ө
*ü	𐍣	у	у	у	у	*ä, *e *i, *ö, *ü	Beserman *ü > ө Irregularly, Udmurt *u > ы/и

Vowel correspondences in Permic languages (non-initial syllable)
Proto-Permic	Old Komi	Komi-Zyrian	Komi-Permyak	Komi-Yazva	Udmurt	notes
*a	𐍐	а	а	a	а / о	
*ä	𐍩	ӧ	ӧ	ө	е	
*i	𐍙 / 𐍨	и / ы	и / ы	и / ө	и / ы / у	different realisations in dialectal Udmurt

== Morphophonology ==
Noun roots in the Permic languages are predominantly monosyllabic and invariable with the canonical shape (C)VC. CV roots, such as Udmurt ву /ʋu/, Komi and Permyak ва /ʋa/ 'water', and (C)VCC roots, such as Udmurt урт /urt/, Komi орт /ort/ 'soul', exist as well. In Udmurt, there are furthermore a number of bisyllabic roots, mostly of the shape (C)VCɯ.

In noun roots with certain final clusters, the second consonant surfaces only when followed with a vowel in inflected or derived forms :

Full cluster	Shortens to	Example
-nm-	-n	син /ɕin/ 'eye'
-pt-	-p	шеп /ʃep/ 'ear of corn'
-kt-	-k	кык /kɯk/ '2'
-sk-	-s	мус /mus/ 'liver'
-ʃk-	-ʃ	мыш /mɯʃ/ 'back'
-ɕk-	-ɕ	юсь /juɕ/ 'swan'

Udmurt has similar alternation for a number of other clusters of the shape voiced consonant+/m/, while Komi-Zyryan adds a number of clusters of the shape voiced consonant+/j/.

The verb root for 'to come': Udmurt лыкты- /lɯktɯ-/, Komi локты- /loktɯ-/ also shows alternation to plain /k/ in e.g. the imperative (in Udmurt only dialectally).

== Bibliography ==
- Lytkin, Vasily (1957). Историческая грамматика коми языка (in Russian). Syktyvkar: Коми книжное издательство.
- Lytkin, Vasily (1964). Исторический вокализм пермских языков (in Russian). Moscow: Наука.
- Lytkin, Vasily (1970). Краткий этимологический словарь коми языка (in Russian). Moscow: Наука.
- Bartens, Raija (2000). Permiläisten kielten rakenne ja kehitys (in Finnish). Helsinki: Suomalais-Ugrilainen Seura. ISBN 952-5150-55-0.
- Csúcs, Sándor (2005). Die Rekonstruktion der permischen Grundsprache. Bibliotheca Uralica (in German). Vol. 13. Budapest: Akadémiai Kiadó. ISBN 963-05-8184-1.
- Riese, Timothy (8 April 2015). Abondolo, Daniel (ed.). The Uralic Languages. Routledge. pp. 249–275. ISBN 978-1-136-13500-2.
