= Kosa (river) =

River in Perm Krai, Russia

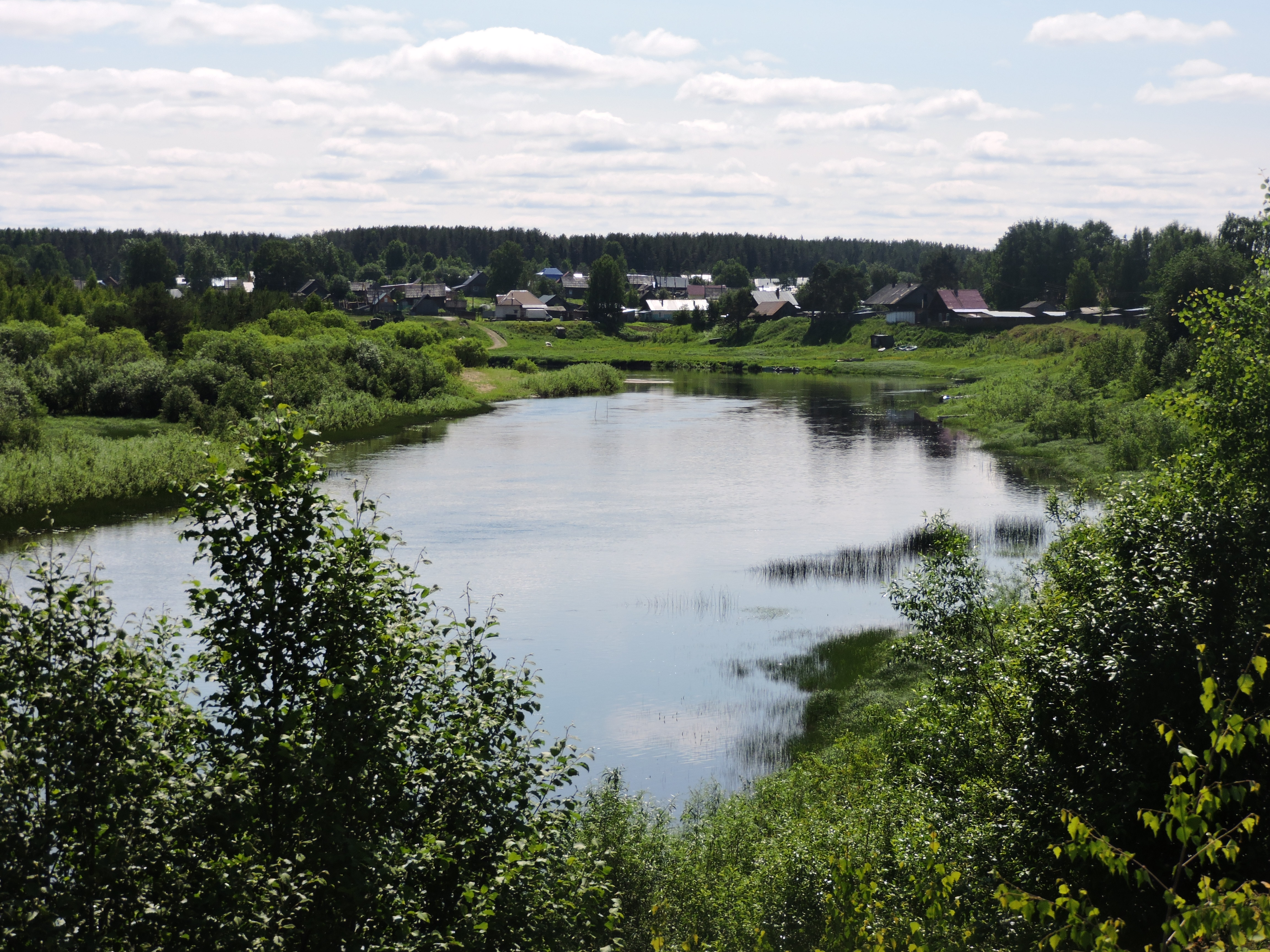

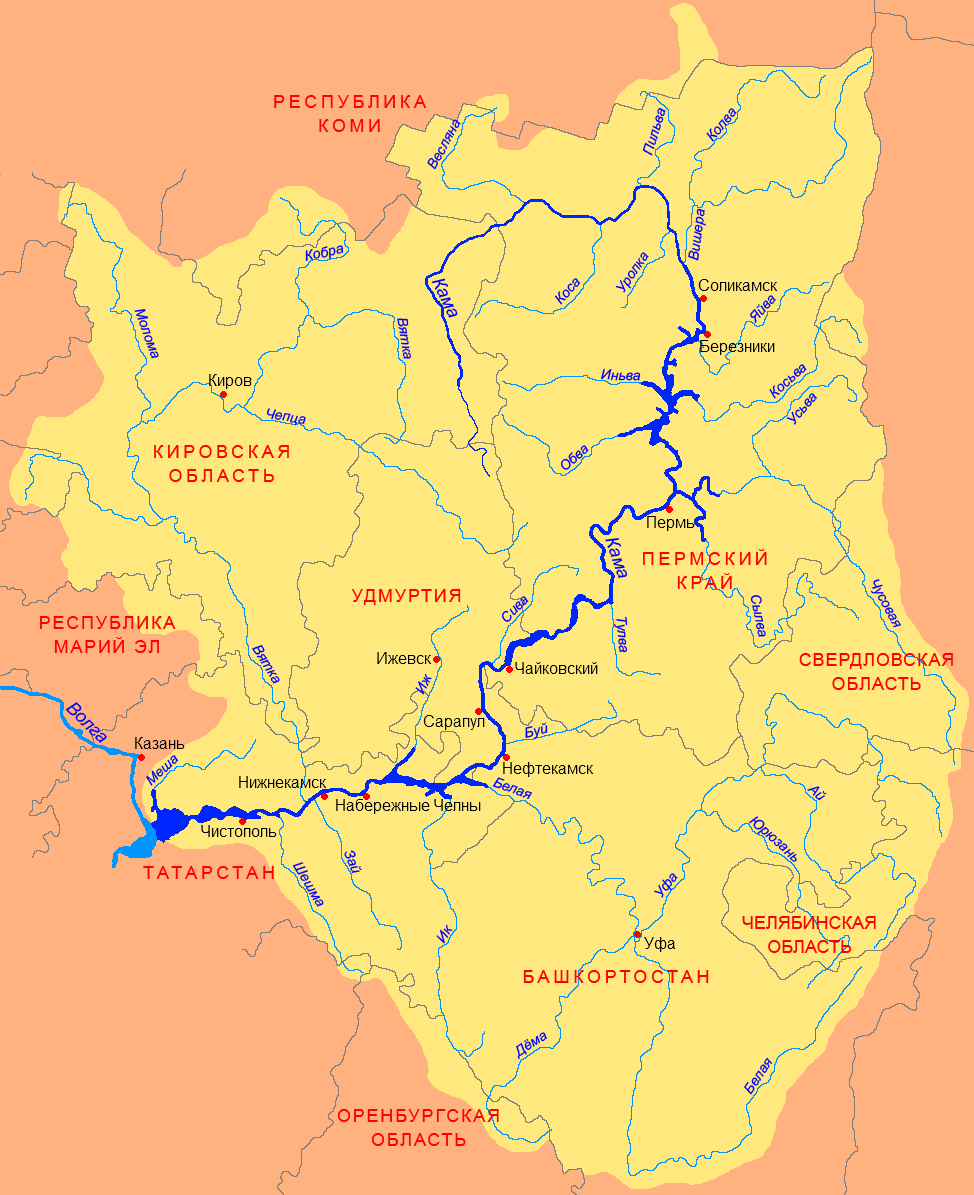
- Scheme of the Kama River Basin.

Physical characteristics
- Source
  - location: Upper Kama Upland
- Mouth: Kama
  - coordinates: 60°11′55″N 55°10′08″E
- Length: 267 km (166 mi)
- Basin size: 10,300 km^{2} (4,000 sq mi)

Basin features
- Progression: Kama→ Volga→ Caspian Sea

The Kosa (Russian: Коса, Komi: Кöсва) is a river in Perm Krai, Russia, a right tributary of the Kama. The river is 267 kilometres (166 mi) long and has a basin of 10,300 square kilometres (4,000 mi^{2}). The Kosa freezes up in late October or November and stays icebound until April or early May. It starts in the extreme south of Kosinsky District and flows north. The mouth of the river is near the village of Ust-Kosa. Banks are lowland. There are swamp Ydzhidnyur in the basin of the Kosa.

Main tributaries:

- Left: Yancher, Sepol, Onolva, Lolog, Odan, Sym
- Right: Yum, Lopva, Lopan, Lolym, Siya, Bulach.

== Etymology ==
The name of the river is composed of the Komi-Permyak words ‘kös’ (dry) and ‘va’ (water), that can be translated as ‘dry water’. Komi-Permyak people call the river ‘Kösva’.
