= Demidovo, Perm Krai =

Demidovo Демидово
- Village
- Location within Perm Krai Location within Russia
- Coordinates: 59°39′N 55°17′E
- Country: Russia
- Region: Perm Krai
- District: Kosinsky District
- Time zone: UTC+5:00

Demidovo (Russian: Демидово) is a rural locality (a village) in Levichanskoye Rural Settlement, Kosinsky District, Perm Krai, Russia. The population was 21 as of 2010. There are 2 streets.

== Geography ==
It is located 48 km south-east from Kosa.
