= Demidovo, Cherepovetsky District, Vologda Oblast =

Demidovo Демидово
- Village
- Location within Vologda Oblast Location within Russia
- Coordinates: 58°56′N 38°09′E
- Country: Russia
- Region: Vologda Oblast
- District: Cherepovetsky District
- Time zone: UTC+3:00

Demidovo (Russian: Демидово) is a rural locality (a village) in Myaksinskoye Rural Settlement, Cherepovetsky District, Vologda Oblast, Russia. The population was 1 as of 2002.

== Geography ==
Demidovo is located 30 km (19 mi) southeast of Cherepovets (the district's administrative centre) by road. Kustets is the nearest rural locality.
