= Srednyaya Sluda =

Srednyaya Sluda Средняя Слуда
- Village
- Location within Vologda Oblast Location within Russia
- Coordinates: 60°16′N 41°36′E
- Country: Russia
- Region: Vologda Oblast
- District: Syamzhensky District
- Time zone: UTC+3:00

Srednyaya Sluda (Russian: Средняя Слуда) is a rural locality (a village) in Dvinitskoye Rural Settlement, Syamzhensky District, Vologda Oblast, Russia. The population was 9 as of 2002.

== Geography ==
Srednyaya Sluda is 50 km northeast of Syamzha (the district's administrative centre) by road. Novaya Sluda is the nearest rural locality.
