= Demidovo, Sheksninsky District, Vologda Oblast =

Demidovo Демидово
- Village
- Location within Vologda Oblast Location within Russia
- Coordinates: 59°16′N 38°16′E
- Country: Russia
- Region: Vologda Oblast
- District: Sheksninsky District
- Time zone: UTC+3:00

Demidovo (Russian: Демидово) is a rural locality (a village) in Zheleznodorozhnoye Rural Settlement, Sheksninsky District, Vologda Oblast, Russia. The population was 131 as of 2002.

== Geography ==
Demidovo is located 18 km northwest of Sheksna (the district's administrative centre) by road. Sokolye is the nearest rural locality.
