= Demidovo, Gus-Khrustalny District, Vladimir Oblast =

Demidovo Демидово
- Village
- Location within Vladimir Oblast Location within Russia
- Coordinates: 55°23′N 40°18′E
- Country: Russia
- Region: Vladimir Oblast
- District: Gus-Khrustalny District
- Time zone: UTC+3:00

Demidovo (Russian: Деми́дово) is a rural locality (a village) and the administrative center of Demidovskoye Rural Settlement, Gus-Khrustalny District, Vladimir Oblast, Russia. The population was 577 as of 2010. There are 5 streets.

== Geography ==
Demidovo is located 40 km southwest of Gus-Khrustalny (the district's administrative centre) by road. Aristovo is the nearest rural locality.
