= Srednyaya Kuba =

Srednyaya Kuba Средняя Куба
- Village
- Location within Perm Krai Location within Russia
- Coordinates: 56°35′N 55°56′E
- Country: Russia
- Region: Perm Krai
- District: Chernushinsky District
- Time zone: UTC+5:00

Srednyaya Kuba (Russian: Средняя Куба) is a rural locality (a village) in Chernushinsky District, Perm Krai, Russia. The population was 11 as of 2010. There is 1 street.

== Geography ==
Srednyaya Kuba is located 18 km northwest of Chernushka (the district's administrative centre) by road. Nizhnyaya Kuba is the nearest rural locality.
