= Srednyaya Zheleznaya =

- Native name: Средняя Железная (Russian)

Location
- Country: Russia

Physical characteristics
- Mouth: Is
  - location: 58 km on the right side
  - coordinates: 58.7994°N 59.267°E
- Length: 10 km

Basin features
- Progression: Is→ Tura→ Tobol→ Irtysh→ Ob→ Kara Sea

The Srednyaya Zheleznaya (Russian: Средняя Железная) is a river in Sverdlovsk Oblast, Russia. The river mouth is located in 58 km on the right side of the river Is, a tributary of the Tura. The length of the river is 10 km. It belongs to the Irtysh Basin.

== See also ==
List of rivers of Russia
