= Baranovo, Gus-Khrustalny District, Vladimir Oblast =

Baranovo Бараново
- Village
- Location within Vladimir Oblast Location within Russia
- Coordinates: 55°22′N 40°50′E
- Country: Russia
- Region: Vladimir Oblast
- District: Gus-Khrustalny District
- Time zone: UTC+3:00

Baranovo (Russian: Бара́ново) is a rural locality (a village) in Krasnooktyabrskoye Rural Settlement, Gus-Khrustalny District, Vladimir Oblast, Russia. The population was 49 as of (2021 census); 57 as of 2010.

== Geography ==
Baranovo is located on the Sentur River, 41 km south of Gus-Khrustalny (the district's administrative centre) by road. Tsikul is the nearest rural locality.
