= Sredneye Babalarovo =

Sredneye Babalarovo Среднее Бабаларово
- Selo
- Location within Bashkortostan Location within Russia
- Coordinates: 52°28′N 55°32′E
- Country: Russia
- Region: Bashkortostan
- District: Kuyurgazinsky District
- Time zone: UTC+5:00

Sredneye Babalarovo (Russian: Среднее Бабаларово; Bashkir: Урта Баба, Urta Baba) is a rural locality (a selo) in Yakshimbetovsky Selsoviet, Kuyurgazinsky District, Bashkortostan, Russia. The population was 64 as of 2010. There are 4 streets.

== Geography ==
Sredneye Babalarovo is located 37 km southwest of Yermolayevo (the district's administrative centre) by road. Kuyurgazy is the nearest rural locality.
