= Srednyaya Kamyshinka =

Srednyaya Kamyshinka Средняя Камышинка
- Selo
- Location within Volgograd Oblast Location within Russia
- Coordinates: 50°06′N 45°17′E
- Country: Russia
- Region: Volgograd Oblast
- District: Kamyshinsky District
- Time zone: UTC+4:00

Srednyaya Kamyshinka (Russian: Средняя Камышинка) is a rural locality (a selo) in Lebyazhenskoye Rural Settlement, Kamyshinsky District, Volgograd Oblast, Russia. The population was 184 as of 2010. There are 5 streets.

== Geography ==
Srednyaya Kamyshinka is located in steppe, on the Volga Upland, on the Kamyshinka River, 12 km northwest of Kamyshin (the district's administrative centre) by road. Gryaznukha is the nearest rural locality.
