= Srednyaya Oka =

Srednyaya Oka Средняя Ока
- Village
- Location within Bashkortostan Location within Russia
- Coordinates: 56°03′N 58°13′E
- Country: Russia
- Region: Bashkortostan
- District: Mechetlinsky District
- Time zone: UTC+5:00

Srednyaya Oka (Russian: Средняя Ока; Bashkir: Урта Аҡа, Urta Aqa) is a rural locality (a village) in Bolsheokinsky Selsoviet, Mechetlinsky District, Bashkortostan, Russia. The population was 319 as of 2010. There are 2 streets.

== Geography ==
Srednyaya Oka is located 14 km north of Bolsheustyikinskoye (the district's administrative centre) by road. Bolshaya Oka is the nearest rural locality.
