= Belorechensky, Volgograd Oblast =

Belorechensky Белореченский
- Settlement
- Location within Volgograd Oblast Location within Russia
- Coordinates: 50°59′N 43°02′E
- Country: Russia
- Region: Volgograd Oblast
- District: Novonikolayevsky District
- Time zone: UTC+4:00

Belorechensky (Russian: Белореченский) is a rural locality (a settlement) Krasnoarmeyskoye Rural Settlement, Novonikolayevsky District, Volgograd Oblast, Russia. The population was 24 as of 2010. There are 4 streets.

== Geography ==
Belorechensky is located in steppe, on the Khopyorsko-Buzulukskaya Plain, 70 km east of Novonikolayevsky (the district's administrative centre) by road. Novoberezovsky is the nearest rural locality.
