= Demidovo, Sobinsky District, Vladimir Oblast =

Demidovo Демидово
- Village
- Location within Vladimir Oblast Location within Russia
- Coordinates: 56°01′N 40°01′E
- Country: Russia
- Region: Vladimir Oblast
- District: Sobinsky District
- Time zone: UTC+3:00

Demidovo (Russian: Демидово) is a rural locality (a village) in Kurilovskoye Rural Settlement, Sobinsky District, Vladimir Oblast, Russia. The population was 104 as of 2010.

== Geography ==
Demidovo is located 6 km north of Sobinka (the district's administrative centre) by road. Lakinsky is the nearest rural locality.
