= Sredny, Irkutsk Oblast =

Sredny Средний
- Urban-type settlement
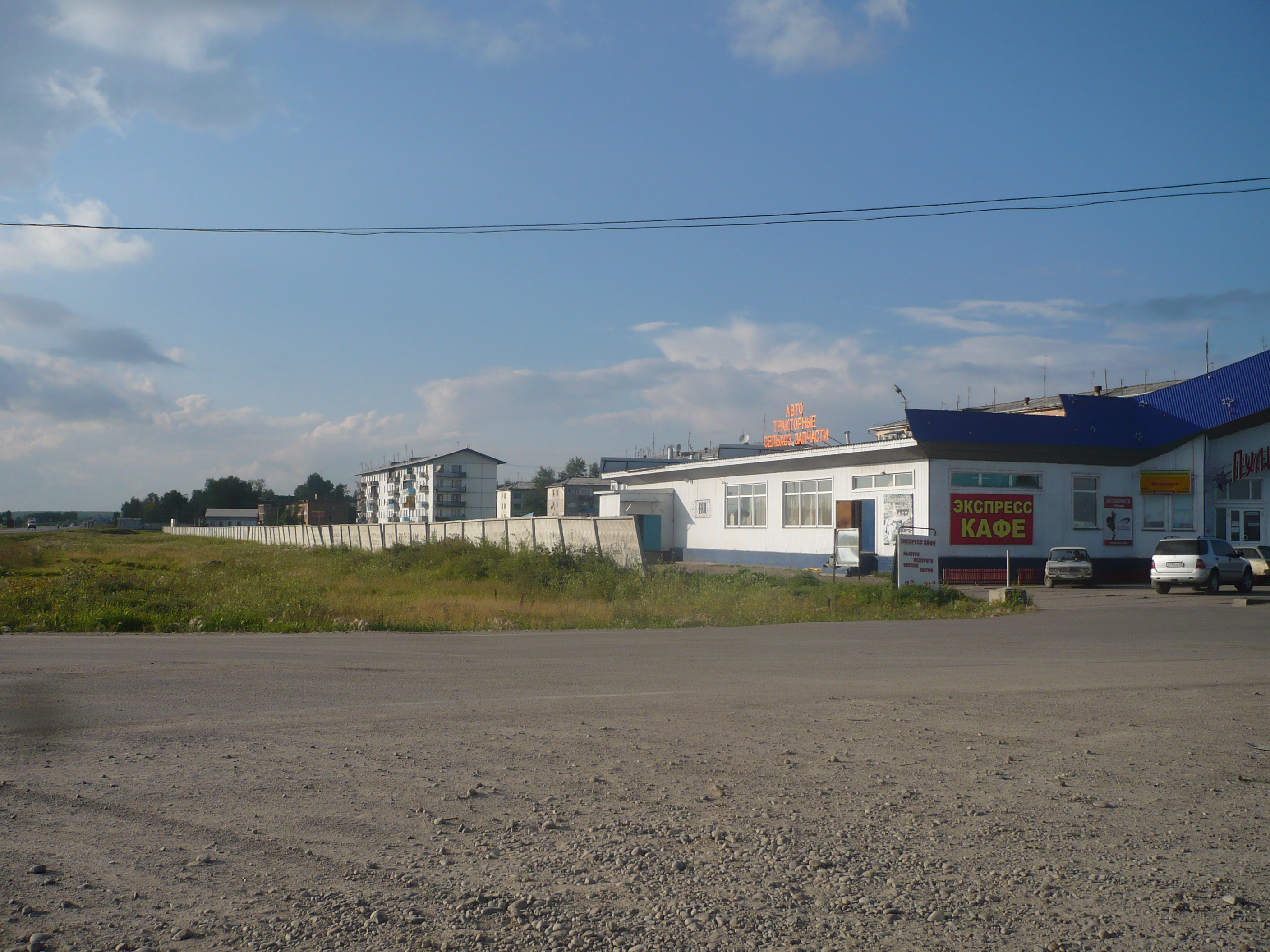

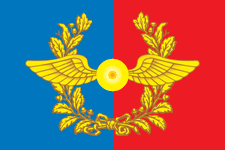
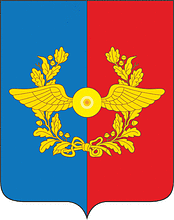
- Flag Coat of arms
- Interactive map of Sredny
- Location of Sredny Sredny (Irkutsk Oblast)
- Coordinates: 52.8819°N 103.4896°E
- Country: Russia
- Federal subject: Irkutsk Oblast
- Administrative district: Usolsky District
- Elevation: 489 m (1,604 ft)

Population (2010 Census)
  - Total: 5,352
  - Estimate (2025): 4,707 (−12.1%)
- Time zone: UTC+8 (MSK+5)
- Postal code: 665475
- OKTMO ID: 25640160051

Sredny (Russian: Средний) is an urban locality (an urban-type settlement) in Usolsky District of Irkutsk Oblast, Russia. Population: 5,352 (2010 census); 5,268 (2002 census); 6,820 (1989 Soviet census).
