= Baranovo, Cherepovetsky District, Vologda Oblast =

Baranovo Бараново
- Village
- Location within Vologda Oblast Location within Russia
- Coordinates: 58°48′N 38°25′E
- Country: Russia
- Region: Vologda Oblast
- District: Cherepovetsky District
- Time zone: UTC+3:00

Baranovo (Russian: Бараново) is a rural locality (a village) in Myaksinskoye Rural Settlement, Cherepovetsky District, Vologda Oblast, Russia. The population was 12 as of 2002.

== Geography ==
Baranovo is located 57 km (35 mi) southeast of Cherepovets (the district's administrative centre) by road. Bolshaya Dubrovka is the nearest rural locality.
