= Srednyaya Poltavka =

Rural locality in Amur Oblast, Russia

Srednyaya Poltavka Средняя Полтавка
- Selo
- Location within Amur Oblast Location within Russia
- Coordinates: 49°48′N 128°11′E
- Country: Russia
- Region: Amur Oblast
- District: Konstantinovsky District
- Time zone: UTC+9:00

Srednyaya Poltavka (Russian: Средняя Полтавка) is a rural locality (a selo) in Srednepoltavsky Selsoviet of Konstantinovsky District, Amur Oblast, Russia. The population was 245 as of 2018. There are 4 streets.

== Geography ==
Srednyaya Poltavka is located 35 km northeast of Konstantinovka (the district's administrative centre) by road. Novotroitskoye is the nearest rural locality.
