= Baranovo, Chernushinsky District, Perm Krai =

Baranovo Бараново
- Village
- Location within Perm Krai Location within Russia
- Coordinates: 56°31′N 56°16′E
- Country: Russia
- Region: Perm Krai
- District: Chernushinsky District
- Time zone: UTC+5:00

Baranovo (Russian: Бараново) is a rural locality (a village) in Chernushinsky District, Perm Krai, Russia. The population was 33 as of 2010. There are 2 streets.

== Geography ==
Baranovo is located 16 km east of Chernushka (the district's administrative centre) by road. Bolshoy Ulyk and Nizhny Kozmyash are the nearest rural localities.
