= Baranovo, Kichmengsko-Gorodetsky District, Vologda Oblast =

Baranovo Бараново
- Village
- Location within Vologda Oblast Location within Russia
- Coordinates: 60°00′N 45°51′E
- Country: Russia
- Region: Vologda Oblast
- District: Kichmengsko-Gorodetsky District
- Time zone: UTC+3:00

Baranovo (Russian: Бараново) is a rural locality (a village) in Kichmengskoye Rural Settlement, Kichmengsko-Gorodetsky District, Vologda Oblast, Russia. The population was 35 as of 2002.

== Geography ==
Baranovo is located 5 km northeast of Kichmengsky Gorodok (the district's administrative centre) by road. Zamostovitsa is the nearest rural locality.
