= Baranovo, Velikoustyugsky District, Vologda Oblast =

Baranovo Бараново
- Village
- Location within Vologda Oblast Location within Russia
- Coordinates: 60°29′N 46°46′E
- Country: Russia
- Region: Vologda Oblast
- District: Velikoustyugsky District
- Time zone: UTC+3:00

Baranovo (Russian: Бараново) is a rural locality (a village) in Teplogorskoye Rural Settlement, Velikoustyugsky District, Vologda Oblast, Russia. The population was 7 as of 2002.

== Geography ==
Baranovo is located 82 km southeast of Veliky Ustyug (the district's administrative centre) by road. Kreksenovo is the nearest rural locality.
