= Baranovo, Kovrovsky District, Vladimir Oblast =

Baranovo Бараново
- Village
- Location within Vladimir Oblast Location within Russia
- Coordinates: 56°08′N 41°16′E
- Country: Russia
- Region: Vladimir Oblast
- District: Kovrovsky District
- Time zone: UTC+3:00

Baranovo (Russian: Бараново) is a rural locality (a village) in Novoselskoye Rural Settlement, Kovrovsky District, Vladimir Oblast, Russia. The population was 14 as of 2010.

== Geography ==
Baranovo is located 29 km south of Kovrov (the district's administrative centre) by road. Marinino is the nearest rural locality.
