= Srednyaya Sultanovka =

Srednyaya Sultanovka Средняя Султановка
- Selo
- Location within Astrakhan Oblast Location within Russia
- Coordinates: 46°17′N 48°27′E
- Country: Russia
- Region: Astrakhan Oblast
- District: Volodarsky District
- Time zone: UTC+4:00

Srednyaya Sultanovka (Russian: Средняя Султановка) is a rural locality (a selo) in Sultanovsky Selsoviet of Volodarsky District, Astrakhan Oblast, Russia. The population was 96 as of 2010. There are 2 streets.

== Geography ==
Srednyaya Sultanovka is located 38 km (24 mi) southwest of Volodarsky (the district's administrative centre) by road. Nizhnyaya Sultanovka is the nearest rural locality.
