= Baranovo, Chagodoshchensky District, Vologda Oblast =

Baranovo Бараново
- Settlement
- Location within Vologda Oblast Location within Russia
- Coordinates: 59°04′N 35°22′E
- Country: Russia
- Region: Vologda Oblast
- District: Chagodoshchensky District
- Time zone: UTC+3:00

Baranovo (Russian: Бараново) is a rural locality (a settlement) in Borisovskoye Rural Settlement, Chagodoshchensky District, Vologda Oblast, Russia. The population was 27 as of 2002.

== Geography ==
Baranovo is located 22 km (14 mi) south of Chagoda (the district's administrative centre) by road. Kolobovo is the nearest rural locality.
