= Aleksandr Rogov (footballer) =

Russian footballer

Personal information
- Full name: Aleksandr Yuryevich Rogov
- Date of birth: 4 June 1986 (age 40)
- Place of birth: Moscow, Russian SFSR
- Height: 1.77 m (5 ft 9 1/2 in)
- Position: Midfielder

Youth career
- FC Dynamo Moscow

Senior career*
Years	Team	Apps	(Gls)
2002–2008	FC Dynamo Moscow	0	(0)
2007	→ FC Metallurg-Kuzbass Novokuznetsk (loan)	30	(2)
2008	→ FC Dynamo Saint Petersburg (loan)	32	(9)
2009	FC Zelenograd	5	(0)
2009	FC Dynamo Saint Petersburg	7	(0)
- * Club domestic league appearances and goals

Aleksandr Yuryevich Rogov (Russian: Александр Юрьевич Рогов; born 4 June 1986) is a former Russian footballer.

== Club career ==
He made his Russian Football National League debut for FC Metallurg-Kuzbass Novokuznetsk on 28 March 2007 in a game against FC Shinnik Yaroslavl.
