= Sredneye, Vologda Oblast =

Sredneye Среднее
- Village
- Location within Vologda Oblast Location within Russia
- Coordinates: 59°26′N 37°26′E
- Country: Russia
- Region: Vologda Oblast
- District: Cherepovetsky District
- Time zone: UTC+3:00

Sredneye (Russian: Среднее) is a rural locality (a village) in Abakanovskoye Rural Settlement, Cherepovetsky District, Vologda Oblast, Russia. The population was 1 as of 2002.

== Geography ==
Sredneye is located 58 km northwest of Cherepovets (the district's administrative centre) by road. Makutino is the nearest rural locality.
