= Baranovo, Verkhnelandekhovsky District, Ivanovo Oblast =

Baranovo Бараново
- Selo
- Location within Ivanovo Oblast Location within Russia
- Coordinates: 56°54′N 42°38′E
- Country: Russia
- Region: Ivanovo Oblast
- District: Verkhnelandekhovsky District
- Time zone: UTC+3:00

Baranovo (Russian: Бараново) is a rural locality (a selo) in Verkhnelandekhovsky District, Ivanovo Oblast, Russia. Population: 83 (2010 census); There are 4 streets in this selo.

== Geography ==
This rural locality is located 8 km from Verkhny Landekh (the district's administrative centre), 102 km from Ivanovo (capital of Ivanovo Oblast) and 331 km from Moscow. Osoki is the nearest rural locality.
