= Belorechensky, Irkutsk Oblast =

Belorechensky Белореченский
- Urban-type settlement
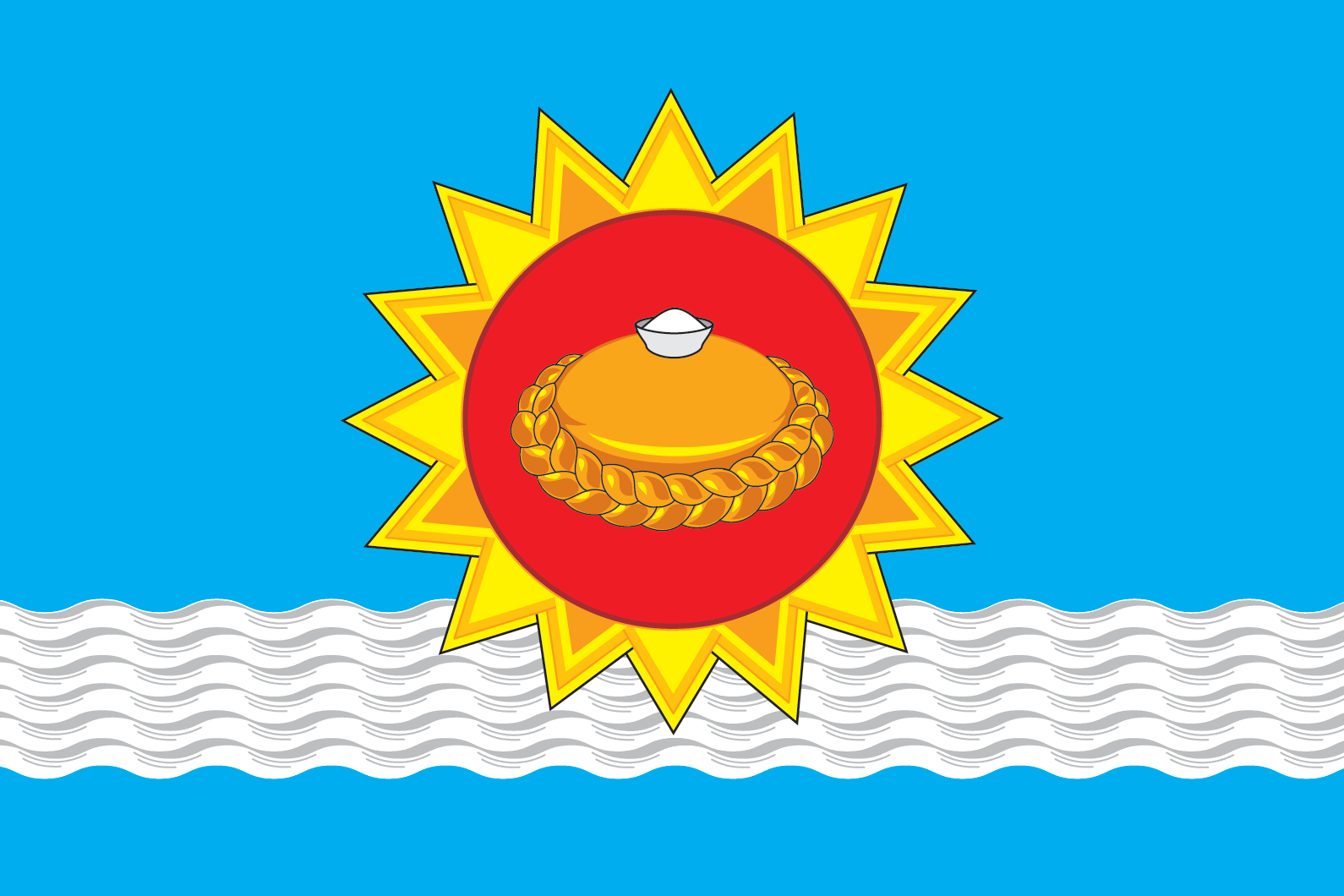
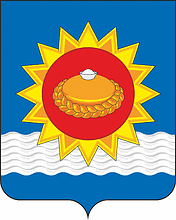
- Flag Coat of arms
- Interactive map of Belorechensky
- Location of Belorechensky Belorechensky (Irkutsk Oblast)
- Coordinates: 52.8132°N 103.5288°E
- Country: Russia
- Federal subject: Irkutsk Oblast
- Administrative district: Usolsky District

Population (2010 Census)
  - Total: 7,984
  - Estimate (2025): 7,493 (−6.1%)
- Time zone: UTC+8 (MSK+5)
- Postal code: 665479
- OKTMO ID: 25640153051

Belorechensky (Russian: Белореченский) is an urban locality (an urban-type settlement) in Usolsky District of Irkutsk Oblast, Russia. Population: 7,984 (2010 census); 8,458 (2002 census); 8,368 (1989 Soviet census).
