= Novozhilova =

Novozhilova Новожилова
- Village
- Location within Perm Krai Location within Russia
- Coordinates: 58°54′N 54°29′E
- Country: Russia
- Region: Perm Krai
- District: Kudymkarsky District
- Time zone: UTC+5:00

Novozhilova (Russian: Новожилова) is a rural locality (a village) in Verkh-Invenskoye Rural Settlement, Kudymkarsky District, Perm Krai, Russia. There is 1 street.

== Census ==
The population was 6 as of 2010.

== Geography ==
Novozhilova is located 17 km southwest of Kudymkar (the district's administrative centre) by road. Golubkova is the nearest rural locality.
