= Usolsky District, Irkutsk Oblast =

Usolsky District Усольский район (Russian)
- District
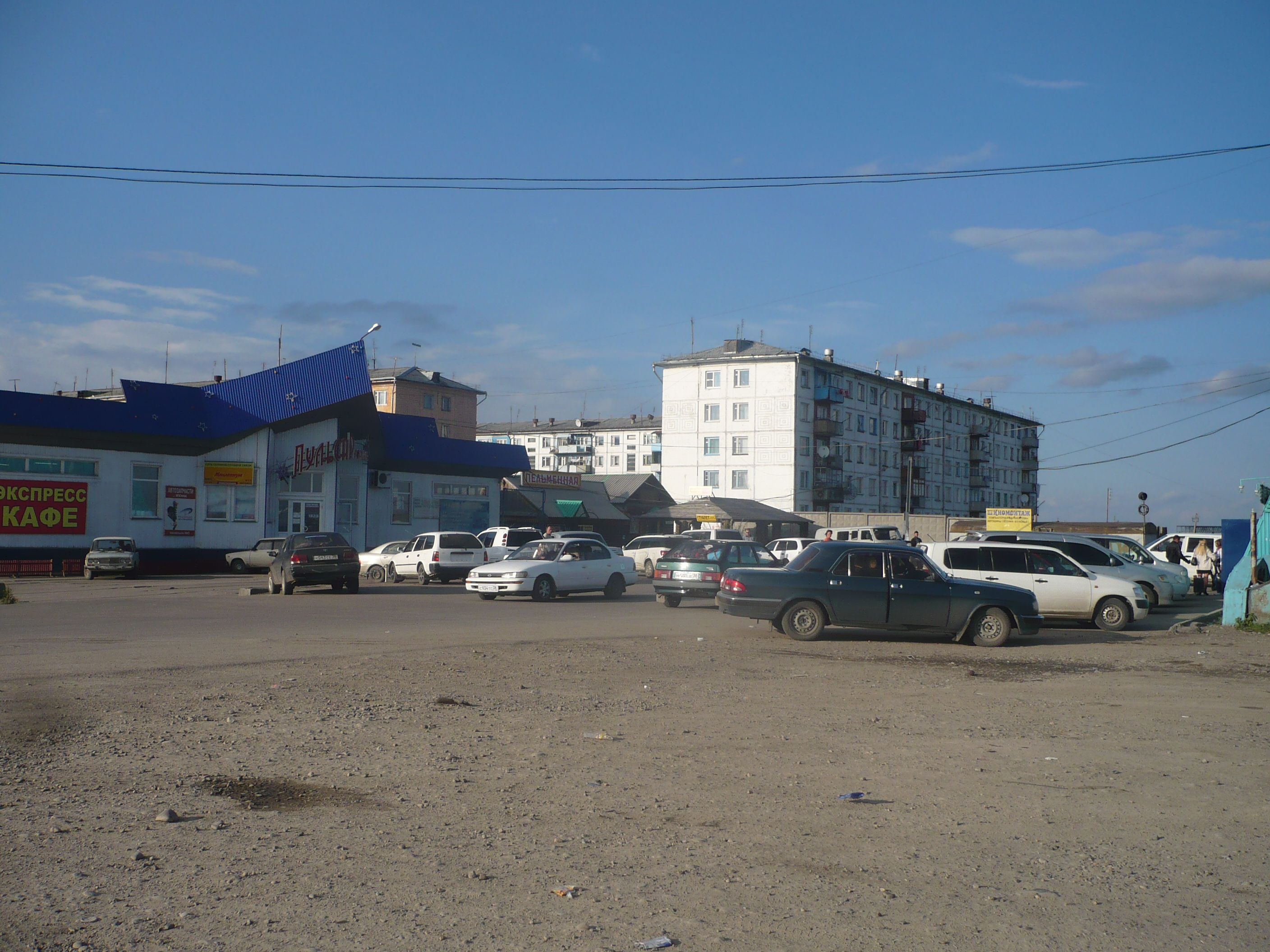
- The work settlement of Sredny in Usolsky District

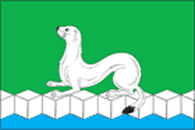
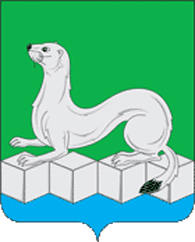
- Flag Coat of arms
- Location of Usolsky District in Irkutsk Oblast
- Coordinates: 52°32′N 103°44′E
- Country: Russia
- Federal subject: Irkutsk Oblast
- Established: 1925
- Administrative center: Belorechensky

Area
  - Total: 6,300 km^{2} (2,400 sq mi)

Population (2010 Census)
  - Total: 50,334
  - Estimate (January 2014): 51,000
  - Density: 8.0/km^{2} (21/sq mi)
  - Urban: 60.8%
  - Rural: 39.2%

Administrative structure
  - Inhabited localities: 5 urban-type settlements, 41 rural localities

Municipal structure
  - Municipally incorporated as: Usolsky Municipal District
  - Municipal divisions: 5 urban settlements, 7 rural settlements
- Time zone: UTC+8 (MSK+5)
- OKTMO ID: 25640000
- Website: https://www.usolie-raion.ru

Population of Usolsky District
- 2010 Census: 50,334
- 2002 Census: 50,561
- 1989 Census: 54,452
- 1979 Census: 45,970

Usolsky District (Russian: Усо́льский райо́н) is an administrative district, one of the thirty-three in Irkutsk Oblast, Russia. Municipally, it is incorporated as Usolsky Municipal District. It is located in the southern part of the oblast and borders Bokhansky District in the north, Angarsky, Shelekhovsky, and Slyudyansky Districts in the east, the Republic of Buryatia in the south, and Cheremkhovsky District in the west. The area of the district is 6,300 square kilometers (2,400 sq mi). Its administrative center is the urban locality (a work settlement) of Belorechensky. As of the 2010 Census, the total population of the district was 50,334, with the population of Belorechensky accounting for 15.9% of that number.

== History ==
The district was established in 1925.

== Administrative and municipal status ==
Within the framework of administrative divisions, Usolsky District is one of the thirty-three in the oblast. Until November 2016, the town of Usolye-Sibirskoye served as its administrative center, despite being incorporated separately as an administrative unit with the status equal to that of the districts. In November 2016, the administrative center was transferred to the work settlement of Belorechensky.

As a municipal division, the district is incorporated as Usolsky Municipal District. Since November 2016, the work settlement of Belorechensky serves as the administrative center of both the administrative and municipal district.

== Military ==
A major Long Range Aviation base, Belaya, is located in the district.
