= Komi-Permyak language =

Uralic language spoken in Russia

Permyak
- коми-пермяцкӧй кыв komi-permyacköj kyv перем коми кыв perem komi kyv
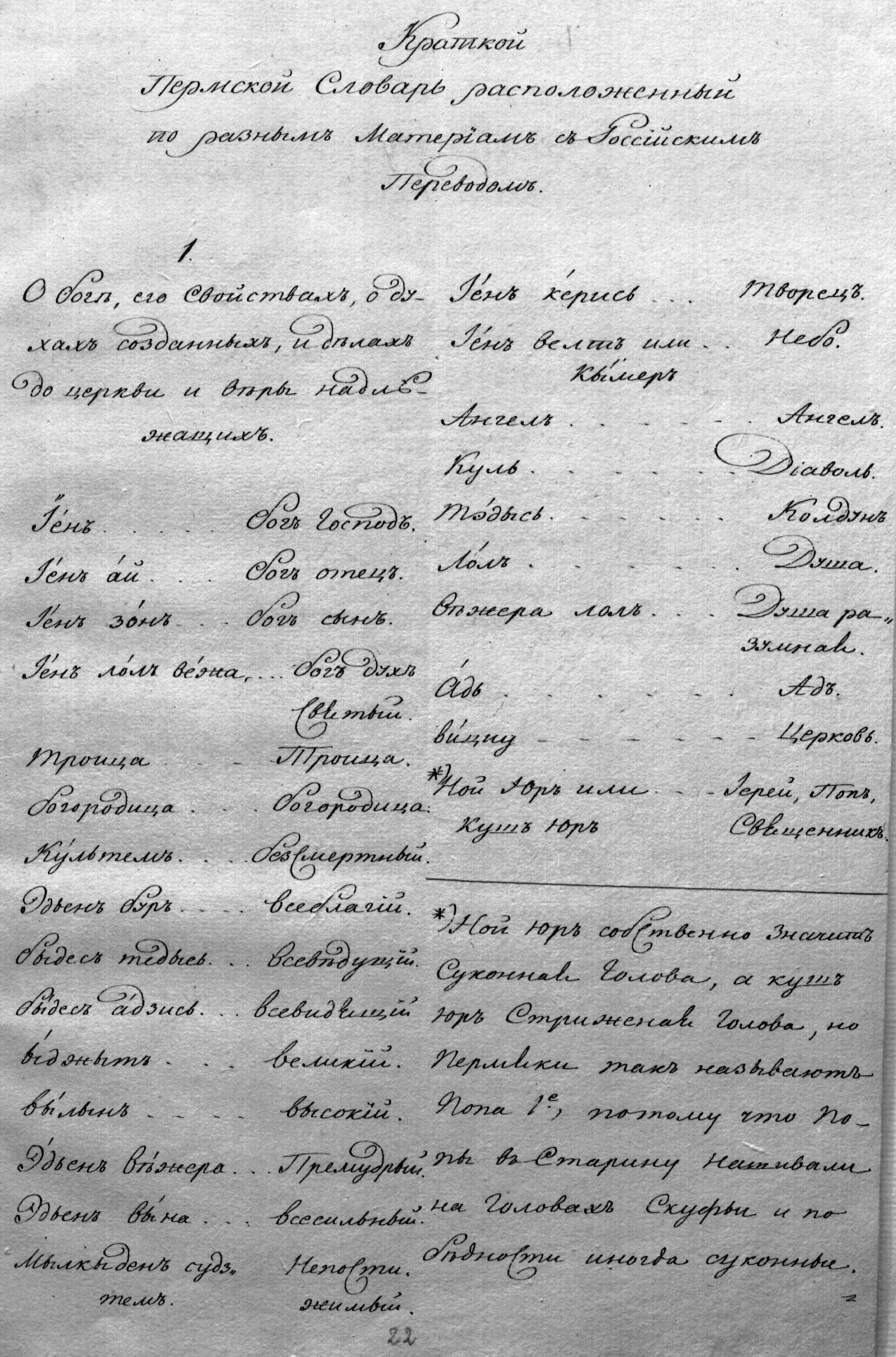
- The Antony Popov's Dictionary (1785)
- Pronunciation: [ˈkomi perˈmʲɑtskəj kɨv] [ˈperem ˈkomi kɨv]
- Native to: Russia
- Region: Perm Krai; Kirov Oblast
- Ethnicity: Komi-Permyak
- Native speakers: 63,000 (2010 census)
- Language family: Uralic: Permic; Komi; Permyak

Language codes
- ISO 639-3: koi
- Glottolog: komi1269
- ELP: Komi-Permyak
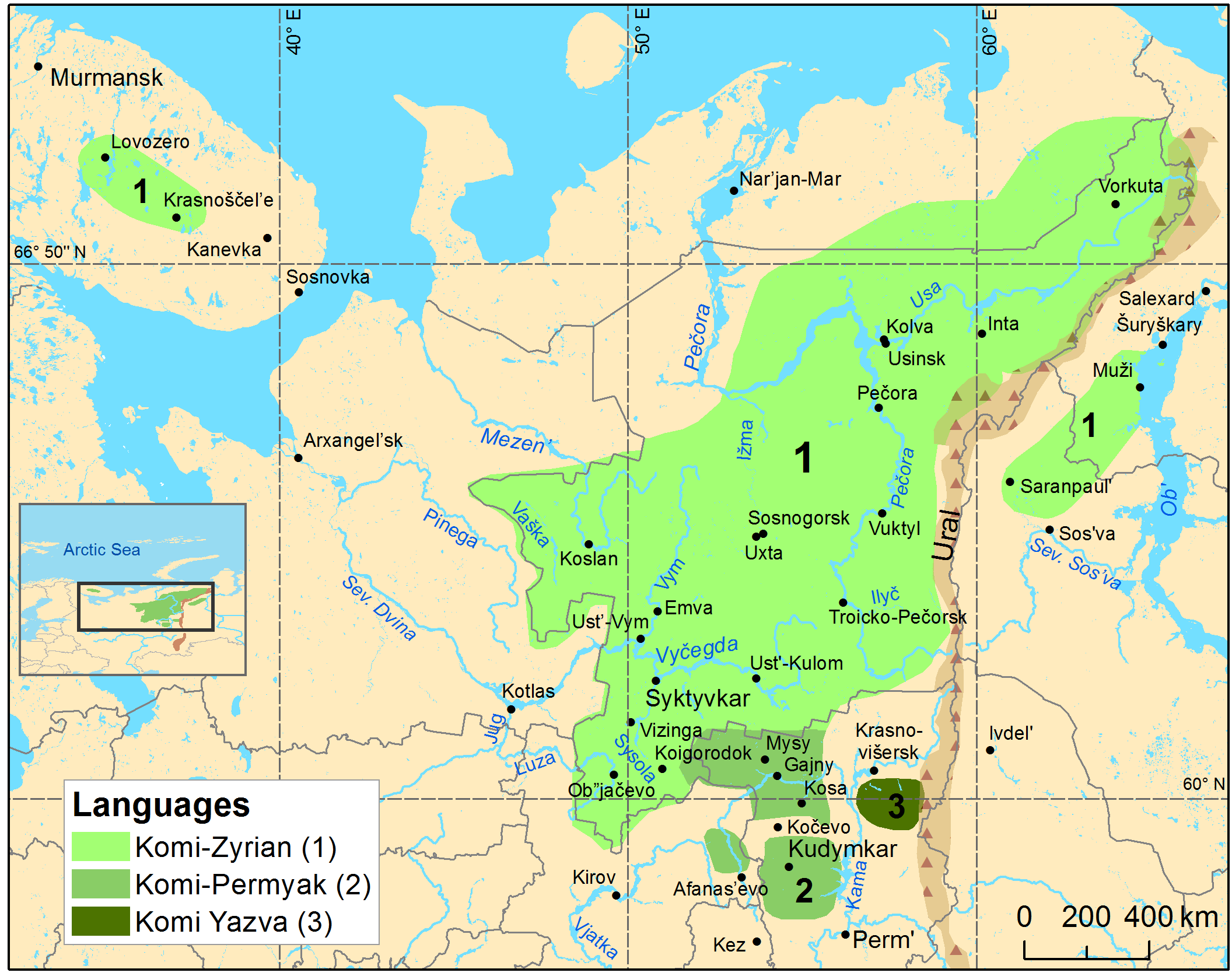
- Traditional distribution of the Komi languages

- Permyak is classified as Definitely Endangered by the UNESCO Atlas of the World's Languages in Danger (2010)

Komi-Permyak (перем коми кыв, IPA: [ˈperem ˈkomi kɨv], or коми-пермяцкӧй кыв, IPA: [ˈkomi perˈmʲɑtskəj kɨv]), also known as Permyak, is one of two Permic varieties in the Uralic language family that form a pluricentric language, the other being Komi-Zyryan. Udmurt is another Permic language spoken outside of the region and not a member of the Komi pluricentric language.

The Komi-Permyak language, spoken in Perm Krai of Russia and written using the Komi Cyrillic alphabet, was co-official with Russian in the Komi-Permyak Okrug of Perm Krai.

== Glottonym ==
The original name of the Komi-Permyak language is коми кыв "Komi language", identical with the native name of the Komi-Zyryan language.

In the 1920s, the Soviet authorities introduced the new name for the Komi language in the Perm Region as коми-пермяцкий язык, the Komi-Permian language, combining the native name of the language with the Russian one. The new name was transliterated in Komi as коми-пермяцкöй кыв 'Komi-Permyak language'. In this way, the local language was nominally separated from the Komi-Zyryan language, that officially received the original name, the Komi language. The Komis of the Perm Region had to officially use the new name, even though it has negative connotations for the speakers, continuing to use the original name, the Komi language, exclusively in their colloquial speech.

Only in the early years of the first decade of the 2000s has there begun a controversial process of replacing the offensive official name with a more correct one. The term перем коми кыв 'Permian Komi language' was proposed and it is used nowadays (alongside the old term) in local mass-media, in scientific papers and in the Komi-Permyak version of Wikipedia.

== Dialects ==
All of the Komi-Permyak dialects are easily mutually intelligible and, to a lesser extent, mutually intelligible with the Komi-Zyryan dialects.

Upper Lupya Mysy (former rural council) Kosa-Kama Kochevo Zyuzdino (Afanasyevo) Yazva Kudymkar-Inva Lower Inva On Nerdva

The Komi-Permyak dialects may be divided geographically into Northern and Southern groups, and phonemically into /l/ and /v/ groups:

1. Northern
  - /l/ type: лым /lɨm/ "snow", вӧл /vɘl/ "a horse", вӧлтӧг /vɘltɘg/ "without a horse", вӧлӧн /vɘlɘn/ "with a horse, on a horse"
    - Upper Lupya
    - Mysy (former rural council)
    - Kosa-Kama
    - Kochevo
    - Zyuzdino (Afanasyevo)
    - Yazva
2. Southern
  - /v/ type: вым /vɨm/, вӧв /vɘv/, вӧвтӧг /vɘvtɘg/, вӧвӧн /vɘvɘn/
    - Kudymkar-Inva
    - Lower Inva
  - Southern /l/ type: лым /lɨm/, вӧл /vɘl/, вӧлтӧг /vɘltɘg/, вӧлӧн /vɘlɘn/
    - On
    - Nerdva

Formerly a southern dialect group existed in the Obva river basin, but it is now extinct except for the Nerdva dialect. Because of this the latter is nowadays usually considered together with the central group, which in this way has become "southern".

The central (new southern) and northern groups of Komi-Permyak are spoken in Komi Okrug of Perm Krai, where the language was standardized in the 1920s. The modern standard is based on Kudymkar dialect of the central group, but many elements of northern dialects were included as well, so that the "literary language" has significant differences in its morphological system from the "main" dialect.

The central dialects, spoken in the Ińva river basin, differ considerably from the other Komi-Permyak dialects due to the general shift of etymological /l/ to /v/, then to /w/, and finally to the disappearance of the consonant, which has triggered significant changes in morphology.

The differences between the Kudymkar and Uliś Ińva dialects are mainly in accentuation: the Uliś Ińva has a phonological stress (the Öń too), whereas the Kudymkar dialect (like as Ńerdva) has a morphological one. The Ńerdva dialect retains the etymological /l/. The same can be said about the Öń dialect (recently extinct), that had connections with the eastern Permian.

The northern group of the Permian dialects (upon Kösva, Kama and Lup rivers) was under a strong Zyryan influence on all levels. The Köć and Kös dialects are closely related with some Syktyv dialects of Zyryan, whereas the Lup dialect was in tenuous connections with the Upper Ezhva dialect for a long time.

The Komi-Permyak standard language refers only to the central and northern groups of the Komi-Permyak dialects. They can be called as proper Permian dialects. The other two groups are marginal.

An only relic of the eastern Permian is the Yaźva dialect, ca. 200 speakers of the ca. 900 ethnical Komis in Krasnovishersky District of Perm Krai. In the early 2000s (decade) it was standardized by authority of the krai. The dialect has archaic system of vowels (including /ö/, /ü/ and /ʌ/), while its accentuation is similar to Uliś Ińva's and its lexical system is like the Northern Permian one.

The Western Permian group is represented by another marginal dialect, Źuźdin (ca. 1000 persons living in Kirov Oblast near the border of Komi Okrug).

== Phonology ==
In the Komi-Permyak standard language there are the same 26 main consonants and 7 vowels as in Komi-Zyryan.

=== Consonants ===
Komi-Permyak's modern consonant system includes 26 native ones, and the additional consonants /ts/, /f/, /x/ in Russian loanwords. In traditional speech the "foreign sounds" were replaced with /t͡ɕ/, /p/, and /k/, respectively.

Consonant phonemes of Permian
		Labial	Dental	Post- alveolar	Palatal	Velar
Nasal		m	n		ɲ	
Plosive	voiceless	p	t		c	k
Plosive	voiced	b	d		ɟ	ɡ
Affricate	voiceless		t͡s^{1}	t͡ʃ	t͡ɕ	
Affricate	voiced			d͡ʒ	d͡ʑ	
Fricative	voiceless	f^{1}	s	ʃ	ɕ	x^{1}
Fricative	voiced	v	z	ʒ	ʑ	
Trill		ʙ^{2}	r			
Approximant	central				j	
Approximant	lateral		l		ʎ	

1. Only in Russian loanwords.
2. There is also a phoneme /ʙ/, which mostly occurs paralinguistically (in interjections), and only in a single lexeme that is not an interjection, namely [ʙuɲɡaɡ] 'dung beetle'.

=== Vowels ===
The Komi-Permyak vowel system can be considered as being three-dimensional, where vowels are characterised by three features: front and back, rounded and unrounded and vowel height.

Komi-Permyak does not distinguish between long and short vowels and does not have vowel harmony. There are no diphthongs; when two vowels come together, which occurs at some morpheme boundaries, each vowel retains its individual sound.

Vowels
	Front	Central	Back
Close	i	ɨ	u
Mid	e	ə	o
Open		a	

== Writing system ==
Both regional standards of the Komi language have an identical alphabet, introduced in 1938. The alphabet (anbur, анбур) includes all the Russian letters plus two additional graphemes: і and ӧ.

The Permian Komi alphabet
А а	Б б	В в	Г г	Д д	Е е	Ё ё
Ж ж	З з	И и	І і	Й й	К к	Л л
М м	Н н	О о	Ӧ ӧ	П п	Р р	С с
Т т	У у	Ф ф	Х х	Ц ц	Ч ч	Ш ш
Щ щ	Ъ ъ	Ы ы	Ь ь	Э э	Ю ю	Я я

Komi alphabet (Коми анбур)
Cyrillic	Latin	IPA	Letter name	Notes
А а	A a	[ɑ]	а	
Б б	B b	[b]	бе	
В в	V v	[v]	ве	
Г г	G g	[g]	ге	
Д д	D d Ď ď	[d] [ɟ] before е, ё, и, ю, я	дэ	
ДЖ дж	DŽ dž	[dʒ]	дже	
ДЗ дз	DŹ dź	[dʑ]	дзе	
Е е	JE je E, e	[e] [je] word-initially and after vowels [e] after palatalized coronals	е	
Ё ё	JO jo	[jo] word-initially and after vowels [o] after [c, ɟ, ɕ, ʑ, ɲ, ʎ]	ё	
Ж ж	Ž ž	[ʒ]	же	
З з	Z z Ź ź	[z] [ʑ] before е, ё, и, ю, я	зэ	
И и	I i	[i] word-initially and after vowels [i] after [c, ɟ, ɕ, ʑ, ɲ, ʎ]	небыд и ("soft i")	
І і	I i	[i] after т, д, с, з, н, л	чорыд и ("hard i")	Non-palatalized form of и.
Й й	J j	[j]	дженьыд и	
К к	K k	[k]	ка	
Л л	L l Ľ ľ	[ɫ] [ʎ] before е, ё, и, ю, я	эл	
М м	M m	[m]	эм	
Н н	N n Ń ń	[n] [ɲ] before е, ё, и, ю, я	эн	
О о	O o	[o]	о	
Ӧ ӧ	Ö ö	[ɘ~ə]	ӧ	
П п	P p	[p]	пе	
Р р	R r	[r]	эр	
С с	S s Ś ś	[s] [ɕ] before е, ё, и, ю, я	эс	
Т т	T t Ť ť	[t] [c] before е, ё, и, ю, я	тэ	
ТШ тш	Č č	[tʃ]	тше	
У у	U u	[u]	у	
Ф ф	F f	[f]	эф	In loanwords.
Х х	H h	[x]	ха	In loanwords.
Ц ц	C c	[ts]	це	In loanwords.
Ч ч	Ć ć	[tɕ]	че	
Ш ш	Š š	[ʃ]	ша	
Щ щ	ŠČ šč	[ʃtʃ~ʃː]	ща	In loanwords.
Ъ ъ	-	-	чорыд пас ("hard sign")	Same usage in Russian.
Ы ы	Y y	[ɨ~ɤ]	ы	
Ь ь	-	[ʲ]	небыд пас ("soft sign")	Same usage in Russian.
Э э	E e	[e]	э	Non-palatalized form of е.
Ю ю	JU ju	[ju] [u] after т, д, с, з, н, л	ю	
Я я	JA ja	[jɑ] [ɑ] after т, д, с, з, н, л	я	

== Grammar ==
Komi-Permyak is an agglutinating language. It uses affixes to express possession, to specify mode, time, and so on.

=== Nouns ===
All Permian Komi nouns are declined for number, case and possession, adding special suffixes to word stems.

==== Number ====
In Permian Komi there are two grammatical numbers: singular and plural. The singular is the unmarked form of a word, and the plural is obtained by inflecting the singular.

The plural marker of nouns is /ez/ (orthographically эз or ез) immediately following a word stem before any case or other affixes. The last consonant of the stem before the plural suffix has to be duplicated.

Singular	Plural	English
керку	керкуэз /kerkuez/	building – buildings
морт	морттэз /morttez/	human – humans
нянь	няннез /ɲaɲɲez/	bread – breads
вӧв	вӧввез /vəvvez/	horse – horses
джыдж	джыджжез /d͡ʒɨd͡ʒd͡ʒez/	martlet – martlets
кай	кайез /kajjez/	bird – birds

The plural suffix has also a reduced variant (a "weak form") /е/ (orth. э or е), that is used combining with some weak forms of possessive suffixes, e.g. киэт 'your (Sg.) hands ' versa киэз 'hands'.

==== Possession ====
The Permian Komi possessive suffixes are added to the end of nouns either before or after a case suffix depending on case. The three suffixes of singular possession have in addition to their main forms the weak variants used combining with a weak form of plural suffix, weak forms of some cases or forming the suffixes of plural possession.

Person	Suffix	Examples	Translation
Singular
1	ö	керкуö	my house
1	м^{1}	керкуам	in my house
2	ыт	керкуыт	your (Sg.) house
2	т^{1}	керкусит	out of your (Sg.) house
3	ыс	керкуыс	his house, the house
3	с^{1}	керкуэс	his houses, the houses
Plural
1	ным	керкуным ^{2}	our house
2	ныт	керкуныт ^{2}	your house
3	ныс	керкуныс ^{2}	their house

1. The weak variants of the suffix
2. The element ны is a marker of plural possession

The possessive suffix of 3Sg is widely used also as a definite article. In colloquial speech it is the main meaning of this suffix.

==== Cases ====
It is assumed, that the Permian Komi standard language has eighteen noun cases: ten grammatical cases and eight locative cases. The disputes continue about the status of some monosyllabic postpositions and a set of dialectal reduced forms of postpositions that can be treated as case suffixes too. The maximal number of all possible cases reaches 30.

The case suffixes are added to the end of nouns either before or after a possessive suffix depending on case. Some cases have weak variants of their suffixes combining with the weak variants of possessive suffixes.

Permian Komi cases
Case	Suffix	Example	Translation
Grammatical cases
nominative	-	öшын	window
accusative	-	öшын	window (as an object)
accusative	öc	мортöc	a man (as an object)
accusative	cö	öшынcö	the window (as an object)
genitive	лöн	öшынлöн	of a window / window's
ablative	лiсь	öшынлісь	from a window
dative	лö	öшынлö	to a window
instrumental	öн	öшынöн	by means of a window
instrumental	на	öшыннас	by means of the window
comitative	кöт	öшынкöт	with a window
abessive	тöг	öшынтöг	without a window
consecutive	лa	öшынла	to get a window
preclusive	ся	öшынся	except a window; then a window
Locative cases
inessive	ын	öшынын	in a window
inessive	а	öшынас	in the window
illative	ö	öшынö	into a window
illative	а	öшынас	into the window
elative	ись	öшынісь	out of a window
elative	си	öшынсис	out of the window
approximative	лaнь	öшынлaнь	towards a window
approximative	ланя	öшынланяс	towards the window
egressive	сянь	öшынсянь	starting from a window
egressive	сяня	öшынсяняс	starting from the window
prolative	öт	öшынöт	along a window
prolative	öття	öшынöттяс	along the window
terminative 1	öдз	öшынöдз	as far as a window
terminative 1	öдзза	öшынöдззас	as far as the window
terminative 2	ви	öшынви	up to a window

=== Adjectives ===
Used attributively, Permian Komi adjectives precede the nouns they modify, and are not declined: басöк нывка 'beautiful girl' → басöк нывкаэслö 'to the beautiful girls'.

However most adjectives can also be used as nouns and sometimes as appositions, in which case they are declined: e.g. ыджыт ("big") → ыджыттэзісь ("out of the bigs"). The declensional paradigma is the same as by nouns, except the main accusative form, that became by adjectives suffix ö instead of öс or a null morpheme by nouns: адззи басöк нывкаöс 'I have found a beautiful girl' → адззи басöкö 'I have found a beautiful [girl]'.

Being predicative an adjective agrees with the subject for number. The plural marker of the predicative is öсь: керкуыс ыджыт 'the house is big ' → керкуэc ыджытöсь 'the houses are big'.

The adjective in Permian Komi have five degrees of comparison

Degree	Affix	Example	Translation
Basic	Ø	том	young
Comparative	-жык	томжык	younger
Superlative	мед-	медтом	the youngest
Sative	-кодь	томкодь	pretty young
Excessive	-öв	томöв	too young
Diminutive	-ыник / -ик	томыник	quite a young

The comparative and the superlative compare the intensity of an object's quality with the other object's one. The sative, excessive and diminutive compare the intensity of the quality with its basic degree.

=== Numerals ===
The numerals in Komi-Permyak

Figures	Cardinal numerals	Ordinal numerals
1	ӧтік	медодзза
2	кык	мöдік
3	куим	куимöт
4	нёль	нёльöт
5	вит	витöт
6	квать	кватьöт
7	сизим	сизимöт
8	кыкьямыс	кыкьямысöт
9	ӧкмыс	ӧкмысöт
10	дас	дасöт
11	дасӧтік	дасӧтікöт
12	даскык	даскыкöт
13	даскуим	даскуимöт
14	даснёль	даснёльöт
15	дасвит	дасвитöт
16	дасквать	даскватьöт
17	дассизим	дассизимöт
18	даскыкьямыс	даскыкьямысöт
19	дасӧкмыс	дасӧкмысöт
20	кыкдас	кыкдасöт
21	кыкдас ӧтік	кыкдас ӧтікöт
30	куимдас	куимдасöт
40	нёльдас	нёльдасöт
50	витдас	витдасöт
60	кватьдас	кватьдасöт
70	сизимдас	сизимдасöт
80	кыкьямысдас	кыкьямысдасöт
90	ӧкмысдас	ӧкмысдасöт
100	сё	сёöт
1000	сюрс	сюрсöт
1985	сюрс öкмыссё кыкьямысдас вит	сюрс öкмыссё кыкьямысдас витöт

=== Personal pronouns ===
Komi personal pronouns inflect in all the cases. The language makes no distinction between he, she and it. The nominative case of personal pronouns are listed in the following table:

Personal pronouns
	singular	plural
1st person	мe 'I'	мийö 'we'
2nd person	тэ 'you'	тiйö 'you'
3rd person	ciя 'he/she/it'	нія 'they'

=== Verbs ===
Permian Komi verbs show tense (present, future, past), mood (indicative, imperative, evidential, optative, conditional and conjunctive), voice and aspect.

The verbal stem is a 2nd person singular of imperative mode: мун 'go', кер 'make'. All the other forms are formed by adding suffixes to the stem.

Some verbal stems having a consonant cluster at the end become expanded with a so-called "voyelle de soutien" ы which is dropped before the suffixes beginning with a vowel: кывзы = кывз+ы 'hear', видчы 'swear' = видч+ы, e. g. кывзыны 'to hear', кывзытöн 'by hearing' but кывзі 'I heard', кывзö 'he hears', кывзан 'you hear'. Thus, these stems with a consonant cluster have their full und reduced variants.

Permian infinitives are marked with -ны added to a stem as in мyнны 'to go', кывзыны 'hear'

All Permian Komi verbs are conjugated in the same way, except for the defective verb вöвны 'to be'.

Negation is mostly expressed by a conjugated negator preceding the stem, e. g. эг мун 'I didn't go'.

The indicative mood has three tenses: present, future and past. The main marker of the present and future tense is а (negat. о), the marker of the past tense is и (negat. э).

Here is conjugation of verb керны 'make, do':

Person	Present		Future		Past	
Person	Affirmative	Negation	Affirmative	Negation	Affirmative	Negation
Singular
1st	кера	ог кер	кера	ог кер	кери	эг кер
2nd	керан	он кер	керан	он кер	керин	эн кер
3rd	керö	оз кер	керас	оз кер	керис	эз кер
Plural
1st	керам(ö)	ог(ö) керö	керам(ö)	ог(ö) керö	керим(ö)	эг(ö) керö
2nd	керат(ö)	од(ö) керö	керат(ö)	од(ö) керö	керит(ö)	эд(ö) керö
3rd	керöны	оз(ö) керö	керасö	оз(ö) керö	керисö	эз(ö) керö

Notes.

1. Present and future forms differ just in affirm. 3rd person (ö / öны to ас / асö).
2. Future and past forms differ only with tense marker (the future -а / о- to the past -и / э-).
3. In present affirmative forms the marker of 3rd person is -ö, which at the same time indicates the tense.

== Some phrases ==
Permian Komi	English
Дыр ов! Дыр олö!	Hello! (Sg); Hello! (Pl)
Олат-вöлат!	How do you do!
Бур асыв!	Good morning!
Бур лун!	Good afternoon!
Бур рыт!	Good evening!
Аттьö!	Thank you!
Нем понда!	Not at all!
Эн жö вид!	Excuse me!
Кыдз тэнö шуöны?	What's your name?
Менö шуöны Öньö.	My name is Andrew.
Инглишöн кужан-он?	Do you speak English?
Ог!	No, I don't!
Кöр локтан?	When are you coming?
Ашын.	Tomorrow.
Мый керан?	What are you doing?
Муна босьтасьны.	I'm going to the shops.
Тэ кытöн?	Where are you?
Ме öши.	I've lost my way.
Мый дона?	How much it is?
Вит руб.	Five rubles.
Адззисьлытöдз!	Good-bye!
Талун кресення?	Is it Sunday today?
Ну!	Yeah!
Мыйнö!	Yes!
Ог тöд!	I don't know!
Менам абу сьöм.	I have no money.
Сэтчин пос абу.	There is no bridge there.
Но!	O.K.

== Bibliography ==
- Аксёнова, О. П. (2009). Коми-пермяцкие географические термины и их функционирование в топонимии Верхнего Прикамья. Кудымкар: ПНЦ УрО РАН. ISBN 978-5-904524-35-7
- Баталова, Р. М. (1982). Ареальные исследования по восточным финно-угорским языкам (коми языки). Москва: Изд-во «Наука».
- Баталова, Р. М. (1975). Коми-пермяцкая диалектология. Москва: Изд-во «Наука».
- Баталова, Р. М., Кривощекова-Гантман А. С. (1985). Коми-пермяцко-русский словарь. – М.: Русский язык.
- Кривощекова-Гантман, А. С. (2006). Собрание сочинений в 2 томах. Пермь: Перм. гос. пед. ун-т. ISBN 5-85218-289-3; ISBN 5-85218-288-5.
- Лобанова, А. С., Шляхова, С. С. (2010). Коми-пермяцкий язык конца ХХ – начала ХХІ веков: стилистические аспекты. Пермь: Перм. гос. пед. ун-т. ISBN 978-5-85218-475-7
- Лыткин В. И. и др. (1962). Коми-пермяцкий язык: Введение, фонетика, лексика и морфология / под ред. и при соавт. проф. В. И. Лыткина. Кудымкар: Коми-перм. кн. изд-во.
- Пономарева, Л. Г. (2002). Фонетика и морфология мысовско-лупьинского диалекта коми-пермяцкого языка: дис. ... канд. филол. наук. Ижевск.
- Попова, О. А. (2010). Коми-пермяцкий фразеологический словарь. Пермь: Перм. гос. пед. ун-т. ISBN 978-5-85218-489-4
- Тудвасева З.К. и др. (2008). Русско-коми-пермяцкий разговорник. Кудымкар: Коми-Перм. кн. изд-во. ISBN 978-5-87901-124-1
- Цыпанов, Е. А. (1999). Перым-коми гижӧд кыв. Сыктывкар: «Пролог» небöг лэдзанін.
