= Kosa, Kosinsky District, Perm Krai =

Kosa Коса
- Selo
- Location within Perm Krai Location within Russia
- Coordinates: 59°56′N 54°59′E
- Country: Russia
- Region: Perm Krai
- District: Kosinsky District
- Time zone: UTC+5:00

Kosa (Russian: Коса; Komi-Permyak: Кӧс, Kös) is a rural locality (a selo) and the administrative center of Kosinsky District, Perm Krai, Russia. The population was 2,383 as of 2010. There are 23 streets.
