= Kosinsky District =

Kosinsky District Косинский район (Russian)
- District
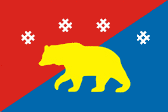
- Flag Coat of arms
- Location of Kosinsky District in Komi-Permyak Okrug, Perm Krai
- Coordinates: 59.984°N 55.058°E
- Country: Russia
- Federal subject: Perm Krai
- Established: February 23, 1924
- Administrative center: Kosa

Area
  - Total: 3,462 km^{2} (1,337 sq mi)

Population (2010 Census)
  - Total: 7,246
  - Density: 2.093/km^{2} (5.421/sq mi)
  - Urban: 0%
  - Rural: 100%

Administrative structure
  - Inhabited localities: 54 rural localities

Municipal structure
  - Municipally incorporated as: Kosinsky Municipal District
  - Municipal divisions: 0 urban settlements, 4 rural settlements
- Time zone: UTC+5 (MSK+2)
- OKTMO ID: 57525000
- Website: http://www.kosa.permkrai.ru/

Kosinsky District (Russian: Коси́нский райо́н; Komi-Permyak: Кӧсладор район, Köslador rajon) is an administrative district (raion) of Komi-Permyak Okrug of Perm Krai, Russia; one of the thirty-three in the krai. Municipally, it is incorporated as Kosinsky Municipal District. It is located in the northwest of the krai. The area of the district is 3,462 square kilometers (1,337 sq mi). Its administrative center is the rural locality (a selo) of Kosa. Population: 7,246 (2010 census); 8,541 (2002 census); 10,615 (1989 Soviet census). The population of Kosa accounts for 32.9% of the district's total population.

== Geography ==
The Kosa River (a tributary of the Kama) flows through the district.

== History ==
The district was established on February 23, 1924.

== Demographics ==
Ethnic composition (as of the 2002 Census):

- Komi-Permyak people: 71.7%
- Russians: 25.7%

== Sources ==
- Законодательное собрание Пермской области. Закон №416-67 от 28 февраля 1996 г. «Об административно-территориальном устройстве Пермского края», в ред. Закона №504-ПК от 9 июля 2015 г. «О внесении изменений в Закон Пермской области "Об административно-территориальном устройстве Пермского края"». Вступил в силу с момента опубликования. Опубликован: "Звезда", №38, 12 марта 1996 г. (Legislative Assembly of Perm Oblast. Law #416-67 of February 28, 1996 On the Administrative-Territorial Structure of Perm Krai, as amended by the Law #504-PK of July 9, 2015 On Amending the Law of Perm Oblast "On the Administrative-Territorial Structure of Perm Krai". Effective as of the moment of publication.).
- Законодательное собрание Коми-Пермяцкого автономного округа. Закон №51 от 24 июня 2005 г. «Об утверждении границ и о наделении статусом муниципальных образований Косинского района Пермского края», в ред. Закона №175-ПК от 7 марта 2013 г. «О внесении изменений в отдельные Законы Пермской области, Коми-Пермяцкого автономного округа об утверждении границ и о наделении статусом муниципальных образований Пермского края». Вступил в силу через 10 дней со дня официального опубликования. Опубликован: "Парма", №138–139, 5 июля 2005 г. (Legislative Assembly of Komi-Permyak Autonomous Okrug. Law #51 of June 24, 2005 On Establishing the Borders and on Granting the Status to the Municipal Formations of Kosinsky District of Perm Krai, as amended by the Law #175-PK of March 7, 2013 On Amending Various Laws of Perm Oblast, Komi-Permyak Autonomous Okrug on Establishing the Borders and on Granting the Status to the Municipal Formations of Perm Krai. Effective as of the day which is 10 days following the day of the official publication.).
