= Cyrillic Supplement =

Group of Unicode symbols

- Range: U+0500..U+052F (48 code points)
- Plane: BMP
- Scripts: Cyrillic
- Major alphabets: Abkhaz; Komi; Mordvin; Aleut
- Assigned: 48 code points
- Unused: 0 reserved code points

Unicode version history
- 3.2 (2002): 16 (+16)
- 5.0 (2006): 20 (+4)
- 5.1 (2008): 36 (+16)
- 5.2 (2009): 38 (+2)
- 6.0 (2010): 40 (+2)
- 7.0 (2014): 48 (+8)

Unicode documentation
- Code chart ∣ Web page

Cyrillic Supplement is a Unicode block containing Cyrillic letters for writing several minority languages, including Abkhaz, Kurdish, Komi, Mordvin, Aleut, Azerbaijani, and Jakovlev's Chuvash orthography.

== Block ==
Cyrillic Supplement^{[1]} Official Unicode Consortium code chart (PDF)
	0	1	2	3	4	5	6	7	8	9	A	B	C	D	E	F
U+050x	Ԁ	ԁ	Ԃ	ԃ	Ԅ	ԅ	Ԇ	ԇ	Ԉ	ԉ	Ԋ	ԋ	Ԍ	ԍ	Ԏ	ԏ
U+051x	Ԑ	ԑ	Ԓ	ԓ	Ԕ	ԕ	Ԗ	ԗ	Ԙ	ԙ	Ԛ	ԛ	Ԝ	ԝ	Ԟ	ԟ
U+052x	Ԡ	ԡ	Ԣ	ԣ	Ԥ	ԥ	Ԧ	ԧ	Ԩ	ԩ	Ԫ	ԫ	Ԭ	ԭ	Ԯ	ԯ
Notes: 1. As of Unicode version 17.0

== History ==
The following Unicode-related documents record the purpose and process of defining specific characters in the Cyrillic Supplement block:

Version	Final code points (Note: Proposed code points and characters names may differ from final code points and names)	Count	L2 ID	WG2 ID	Document
3.2	U+0500..050F	16	L2/98-211	N1744	Everson, Michael (1998-05-25), Additional Cyrillic characters for the UCS
3.2	U+0500..050F	16	L2/98-292R (pdf, html, Figure 1)		"2.3", Comments on proposals to add characters from ISO standards developed by ISO/TC 46/SC 4, 1998-08-19
3.2	U+0500..050F	16	L2/98-292	N1840	"2.3", Comments on proposals to add characters from ISO standards developed by ISO/TC 46/SC 4, 1998-08-25
3.2	U+0500..050F	16	L2/98-293	N1885	"2.4", Comments on proposals to add various characters to ISO/IEC 10646, 1998-08-25
3.2	U+0500..050F	16	L2/98-301	N1847	Everson, Michael (1998-09-12), Responses to NCITS/L2 and Unicode Consortium comments on numerous proposals
3.2	U+0500..050F	16	L2/98-372	N1884R2 (pdf, doc)	Whistler, Ken; et al. (1998-09-22), Additional Characters for the UCS
3.2	U+0500..050F	16	L2/99-010	N1903 (pdf, html, doc)	Umamaheswaran, V. S. (1998-12-30), "8.1.5.1", Minutes of WG 2 meeting 35, London, U.K.; 1998-09-21--25
3.2	U+0500..050F	16	L2/00-182	N2224	Everson, Michael; Ruppel, Klaas; Trosterud, Trond (2000-06-09), Archaic Komi Cyrillic characters for the BMP of the UCS
3.2	U+0500..050F	16	L2/00-187		Moore, Lisa (2000-08-23), "Komi Cyrillic", UTC minutes -- Boston, August 8-11, 2000
3.2	U+0500..050F	16	L2/01-050	N2253	Umamaheswaran, V. S. (2001-01-21), "7.15 Komi Cyrillic", Minutes of the SC2/WG2 meeting in Athens, September 2000
5.0	U+0510..0513	4	L2/05-080R2	N2933	Priest, Lorna (2005-08-02), Proposal to Encode Additional Cyrillic Characters (rev 2005/08/18)
5.0	U+0510..0513	4	L2/05-215		Anderson, Deborah (2005-08-03), Feedback on Cyrillic letters EL WITH HOOK and HA WITH HOOK (L2/05-080)
5.0	U+0510..0513	4	L2/05-230		Priest, Lorna (2005-08-11), Nameslist annotations for new Cyrillic letters
5.0	U+0510..0513	4	L2/05-180		Moore, Lisa (2005-08-17), "Cyrillic (C.18)", UTC #104 Minutes
5.0	U+0510..0513	4		N2953 (pdf, doc)	Umamaheswaran, V. S. (2006-02-16), "7.2.4", Unconfirmed minutes of WG 2 meeting 47, Sophia Antipolis, France; 2005-09-12/15
5.1	U+0514..0523	16	L2/98-211	N1744	Everson, Michael (1998-05-25), Additional Cyrillic characters for the UCS
5.1	U+0514..0523	16	L2/98-301	N1847	Everson, Michael (1998-09-12), Responses to NCITS/L2 and Unicode Consortium comments on numerous proposals
5.1	U+0514..0523	16	L2/98-372	N1884R2 (pdf, doc)	Whistler, Ken; et al. (1998-09-22), Additional Characters for the UCS
5.1	U+0514..0523	16	L2/99-010	N1903 (pdf, html, doc)	Umamaheswaran, V. S. (1998-12-30), "8.1.5.1", Minutes of WG 2 meeting 35, London, U.K.; 1998-09-21--25
5.1	U+0514..0523	16	L2/01-050	N2253	Umamaheswaran, V. S. (2001-01-21), "7.15 Komi Cyrillic", Minutes of the SC2/WG2 meeting in Athens, September 2000
5.1	U+0514..0523	16	L2/06-042		Cleminson, Ralph (2006-01-26), Proposal for additional Cyrillic characters
5.1	U+0514..0523	16	L2/06-181		Anderson, Deborah (2006-05-08), Responses to the UTC regarding L2/06-042, Proposal for Additional Cyrillic Characters
5.1	U+0514..0523	16	L2/06-359		Cleminson, Ralph (2006-10-31), Proposal for additional Cyrillic characters
5.1	U+0514..0523	16	L2/07-003	N3194	Everson, Michael; Birnbaum, David; Cleminson, Ralph; Derzhanski, Ivan; Dorosh, Vladislav; Kryukov, Alexey; Paliga, Sorin; Ruppel, Klaas (2007-01-12), Proposal to encode additional Cyrillic characters in the BMP of the UCS
5.1	U+0514..0523	16	L2/07-055		Cleminson, Ralph (2007-01-19), Comments on Additional Cyrillic Characters (L2/07-003 = WG2 N3194)
5.1	U+0514..0523	16	L2/07-015		Moore, Lisa (2007-02-08), "Cyrillic (C.13)", UTC #110 Minutes
5.1	U+0514..0523	16	L2/07-268	N3253 (pdf, doc)	Umamaheswaran, V. S. (2007-07-26), "M50.11", Unconfirmed minutes of WG 2 meeting 50, Frankfurt-am-Main, Germany; 2007-04-24/27
5.2	U+0524..0525	2	L2/08-144	N3435R	Everson, Michael; Priest, Lorna (2008-04-11), Proposal to encode two Cyrillic characters for Abkhaz
5.2	U+0524..0525	2	L2/08-134	N3429	Ankwab, Alexander; Bzhanija, Akhara (2008-04-14), Glyph Changes for Abkhaz
5.2	U+0524..0525	2	L2/08-161R2		Moore, Lisa (2008-11-05), "Motion 115-M2", UTC #115 Minutes
5.2	U+0524..0525	2	L2/08-412	N3553 (pdf, doc)	Umamaheswaran, V. S. (2008-11-05), "M53.11", Unconfirmed minutes of WG 2 meeting 53
6.0	U+0526..0527	2	L2/08-182	N3481	Priest, Lorna (2008-07-28), Proposal to Encode Additional Latin and Cyrillic Characters
6.0	U+0526..0527	2	L2/08-161R2		Moore, Lisa (2008-11-05), "Consensus 115-C29", UTC #115 Minutes
6.0	U+0526..0527	2	L2/08-412	N3553 (pdf, doc)	Umamaheswaran, V. S. (2008-11-05), "M53.24a", Unconfirmed minutes of WG 2 meeting 53
7.0	U+0528..0529	2	L2/11-265	N4137	Yevlampiev, Ilya; Pentzlin, Karl (2011-07-06), Proposal to encode a missing Cyrillic letter pair for the Orok language
7.0	U+0528..0529	2	L2/11-261R2		Moore, Lisa (2011-08-16), "Consensus 128-C39", UTC #128 / L2 #225 Minutes
7.0	U+0528..0529	2		N4253 (pdf, doc)	"M59.16h", Unconfirmed minutes of WG 2 meeting 59, 2012-09-12
7.0	U+052A..052D	4	L2/12-040	N4199	Everson, Michael (2012-01-31), Proposal to encode four Cyrillic characters in the BMP of the UCS
7.0	U+052A..052D	4	L2/12-007		Moore, Lisa (2012-02-14), "C.14", UTC #130 / L2 #227 Minutes
7.0	U+052A..052D	4		N4253 (pdf, doc)	"M59.16i", Unconfirmed minutes of WG 2 meeting 59, 2012-09-12
7.0	U+052E..052F	2	L2/97-146	N1590	Trosterud, Trond (1997-06-09), Proposal to add 10 Cyrillic Sámi characters to ISO/IEC 10646
7.0	U+052E..052F	2	L2/97-288	N1603	Umamaheswaran, V. S. (1997-10-24), "8.24.7", Unconfirmed Meeting Minutes, WG 2 Meeting # 33, Heraklion, Crete, Greece, 20 June – 4 July 1997
7.0	U+052E..052F	2	L2/98-211	N1744	Everson, Michael (1998-05-25), Additional Cyrillic characters for the UCS
7.0	U+052E..052F	2	L2/98-281R (pdf, html)		Aliprand, Joan (1998-07-31), "Cyrillic characters (IV.C.4)", Unconfirmed Minutes – UTC #77 & NCITS Subgroup L2 # 174 JOINT MEETING, Redmond, WA -- July 29-31, 1998
7.0	U+052E..052F	2	L2/98-301	N1847	Everson, Michael (1998-09-12), Responses to NCITS/L2 and Unicode Consortium comments on numerous proposals
7.0	U+052E..052F	2	L2/98-372	N1884R2 (pdf, doc)	Whistler, Ken; et al. (1998-09-22), Additional Characters for the UCS
7.0	U+052E..052F	2	L2/99-010	N1903 (pdf, html, doc)	Umamaheswaran, V. S. (1998-12-30), "8.1.5.1", Minutes of WG 2 meeting 35, London, U.K.; 1998-09-21--25
7.0	U+052E..052F	2	L2/01-050	N2253	Umamaheswaran, V. S. (2001-01-21), "7.15 Komi Cyrillic", Minutes of the SC2/WG2 meeting in Athens, September 2000
7.0	U+052E..052F	2	L2/12-052R	N4219R	Anderson, Deborah (2012-02-09), Request for 2 New Cyrillic Characters for the Khanty and Nenets Languages
7.0	U+052E..052F	2	L2/12-007		Moore, Lisa (2012-02-14), "C.14", UTC #130 / L2 #227 Minutes
7.0	U+052E..052F	2		N4253 (pdf, doc)	"M59.16j", Unconfirmed minutes of WG 2 meeting 59, 2012-09-12
