= Komi Dje =

Cyrillic letter formerly used in Komi

- Ԃ ԃ

Usage
- Writing system: Cyrillic
- Type: Alphabetic
- Sound values: [ɟ]

Komi Dje (Ԃ,ԃ italics: Ԃ ԃ) is a letter of the Molodtsov alphabet, a variant of Cyrillic. It was used only in the writing of the Komi language in the 1920s.

The letter was derived from the Komi De (Ԁ d) with the addition of a hook. It represented the voiced palatal plosive /ɟ/.

== Computing codes ==
Character information
Preview	Ԃ		ԃ	
Unicode name	CYRILLIC CAPITAL LETTER KOMI DJE		CYRILLIC SMALL LETTER KOMI DJE	
Encodings	decimal	hex	dec	hex
Unicode	1282	U+0502	1283	U+0503
UTF-8	212 130	D4 82	212 131	D4 83
Numeric character reference	&#1282;	&#x502;	&#1283;	&#x503;

== See also ==
- Cyrillic characters in Unicode
