= Alphabet Day =

Alphabet Day may refer to:

- Alphabet Day, observed in Albania on November 22 in celebration of the Congress of Manastir, which unified the country's alphabets
- Day of Slavonic Alphabet, Bulgarian Enlightenment and Culture, observed in Bulgaria on May 24 in celebration of the creation of the Cyrillic script
- Hangul Day, observed in North Korea on January 15 and in South Korea on October 9 in celebration of the creation of the Hangul writing system
- N’Ko Alphabet Day, observed in celebration of the finalization of the N’Ko script
- Old Permic Alphabet Day, observed in celebration of the Old Permic script
- Emma Memma's Alphabet Day, a book by Emma Watkins
