= Sha with breve =

Cyrillic letter

- Ш̆ ш̆

Usage
- Writing system: Cyrillic
- Type: Alphabetic
- Sound values: /ʃ/

History
- Development: Ш ш: Ш̆ ш̆

Sha with breve (Ш̆ ш̆) is an additional letter of the Cyrillic script which was used for Abkhaz and Komi at the start of the 20th century. It is composed of a sha ⟨Ш⟩ with a breve.

== Usages ==
The ш̆ is used in multiple older Cyrillic Abkhaz scripts and Komi scripts, notably in:

- The Abkhaz language alphabet of Peter von Uslar 1862;
- The Abkhaz language alphabet of Gulia and Machavariani 1892;
- The Abkhaz language alphabet of Chochua 1909;
- The Komi language alphabet of Nicolaes Witsen 1897;
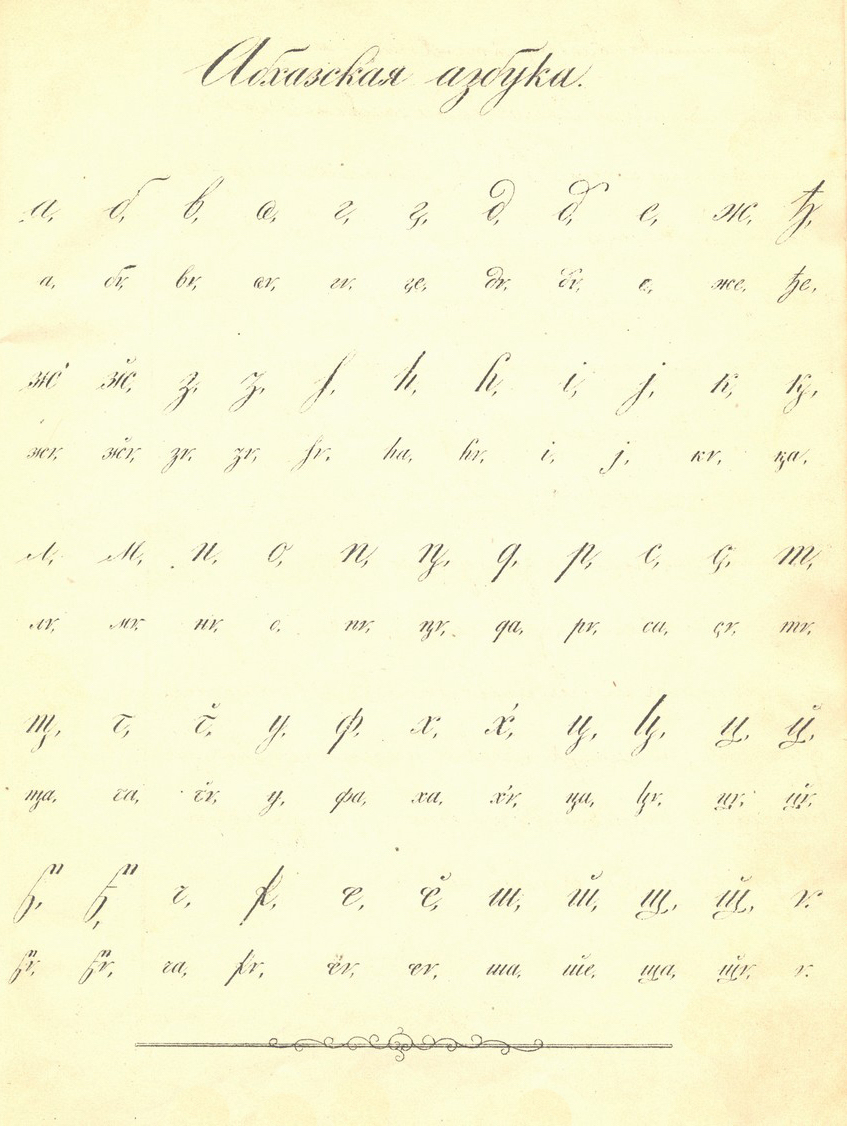
Abkhaz alphabet of von Uslar 1862.

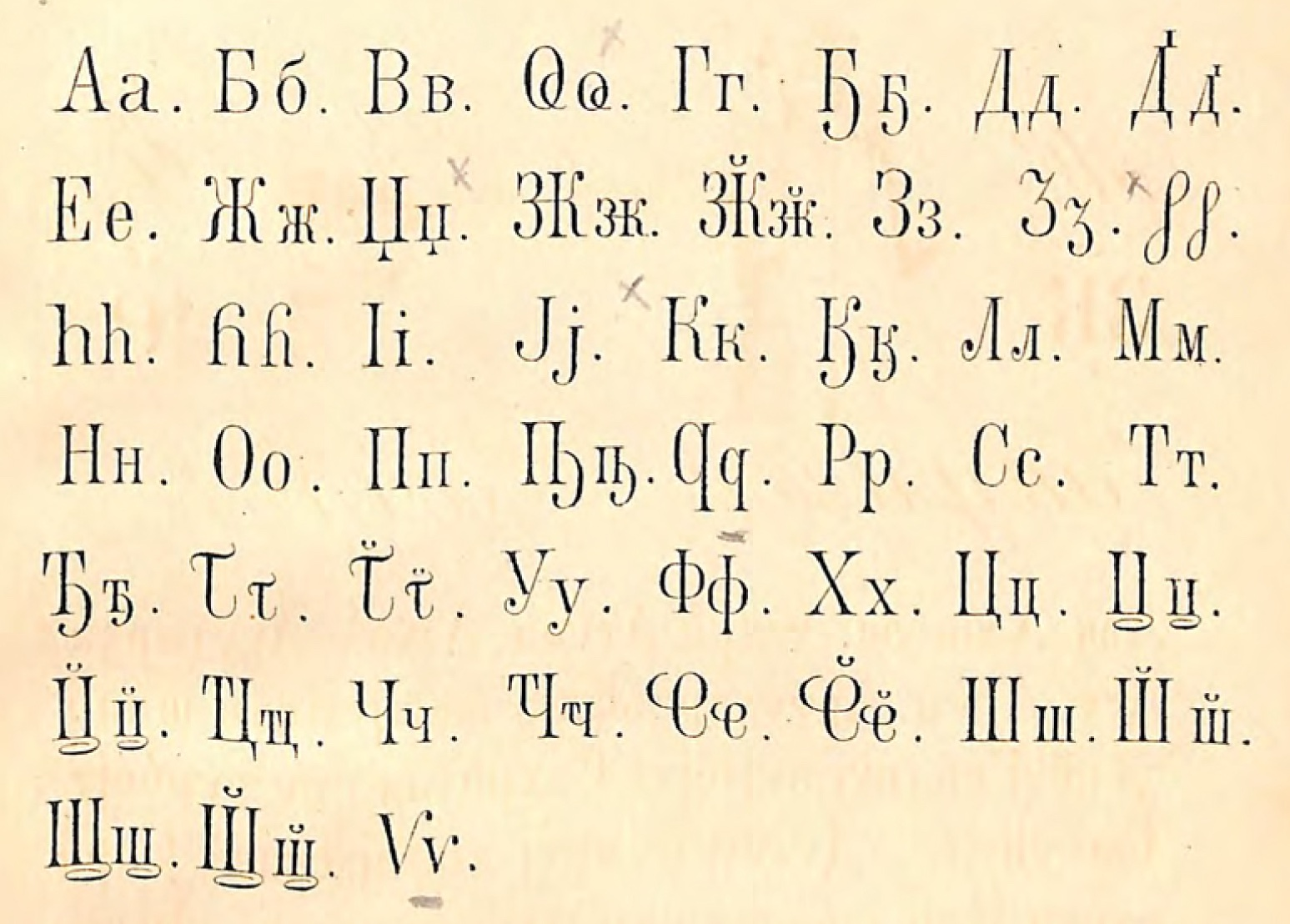
Abkhaz alphabet of Gulia and Machavariani 1892.

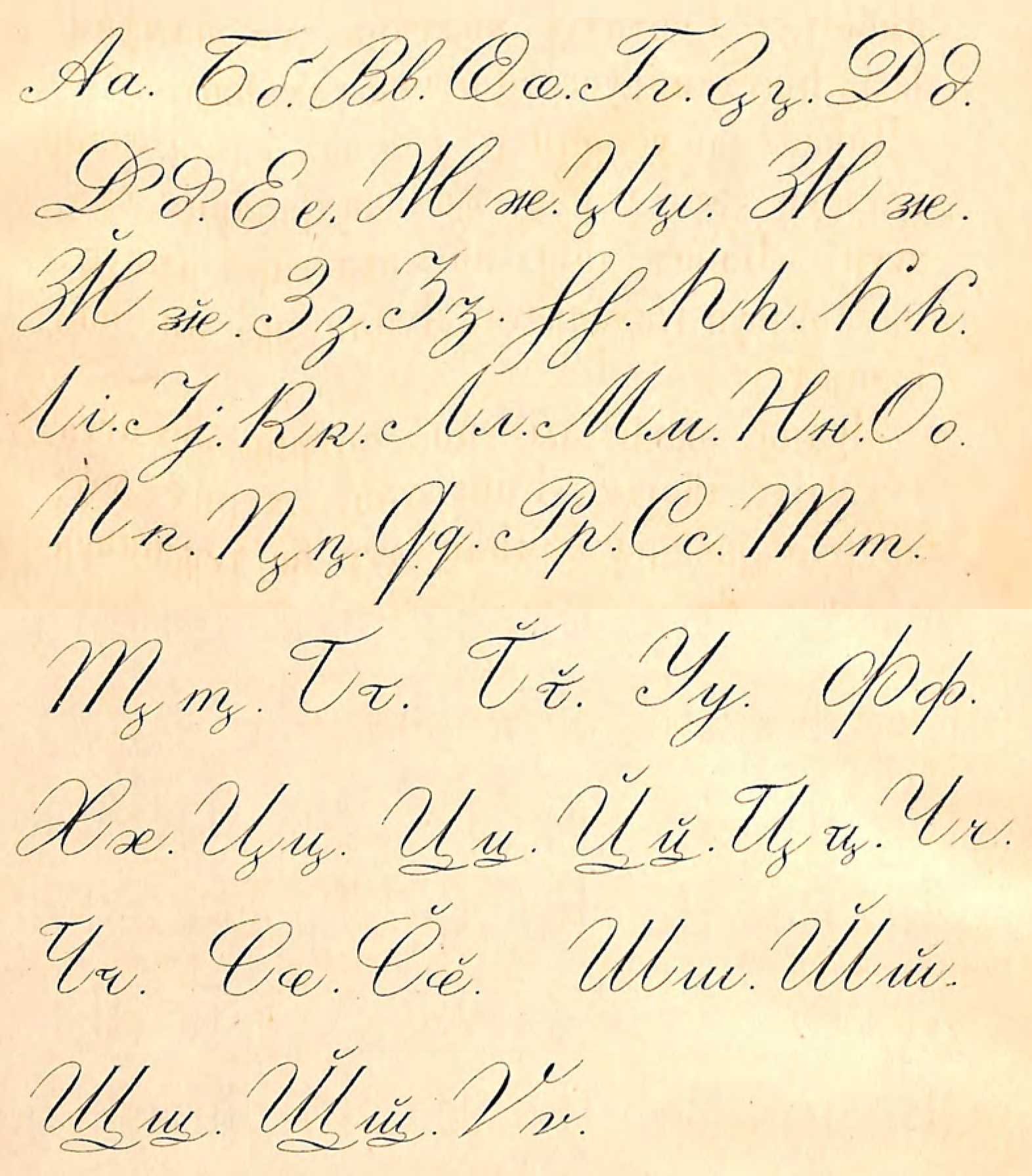
Cursive Abkhaz alphabet of Gulia and Machavariani 1892.

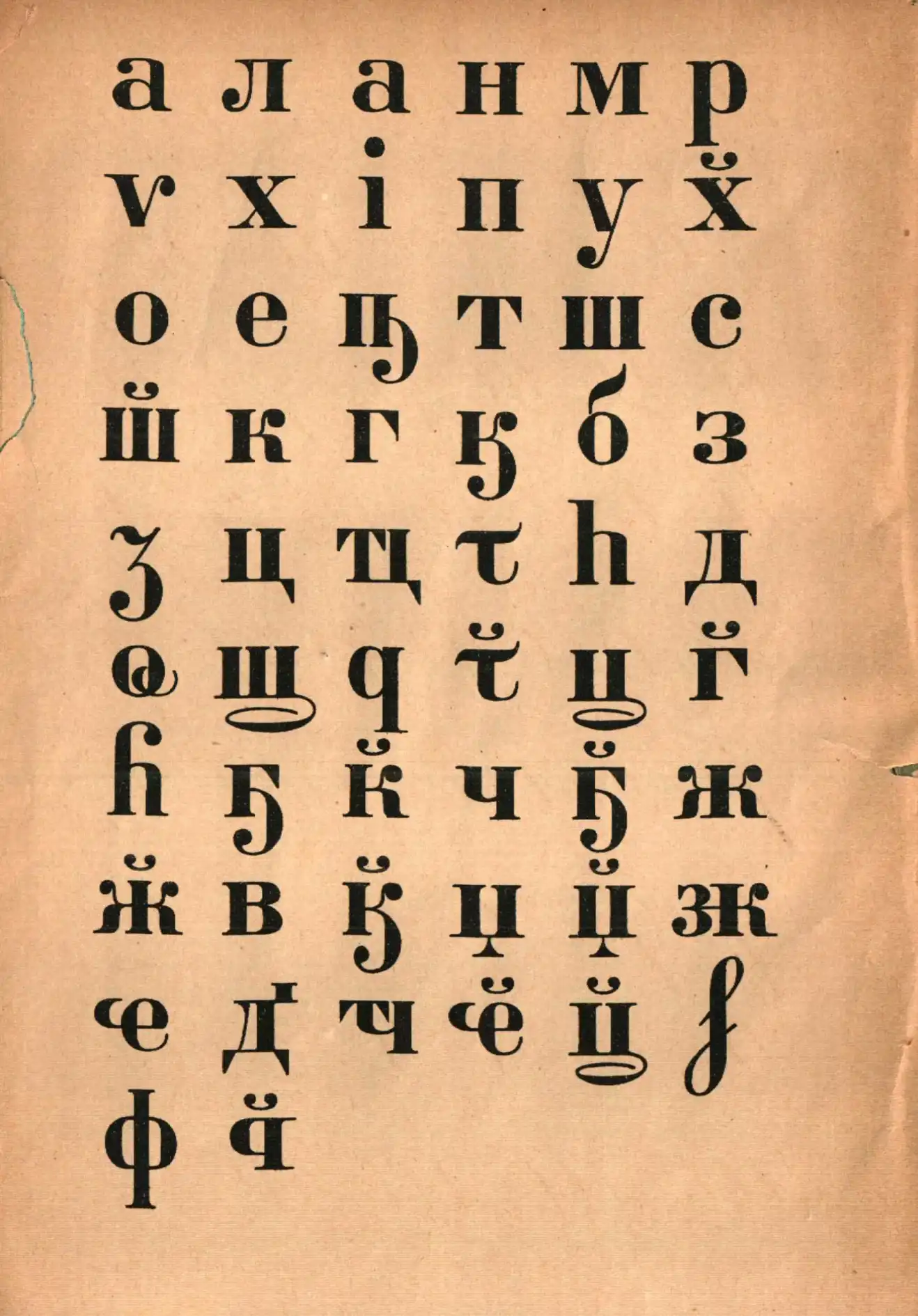
Abkhaz alphabet of Tchotchoua 1909 (not in order).

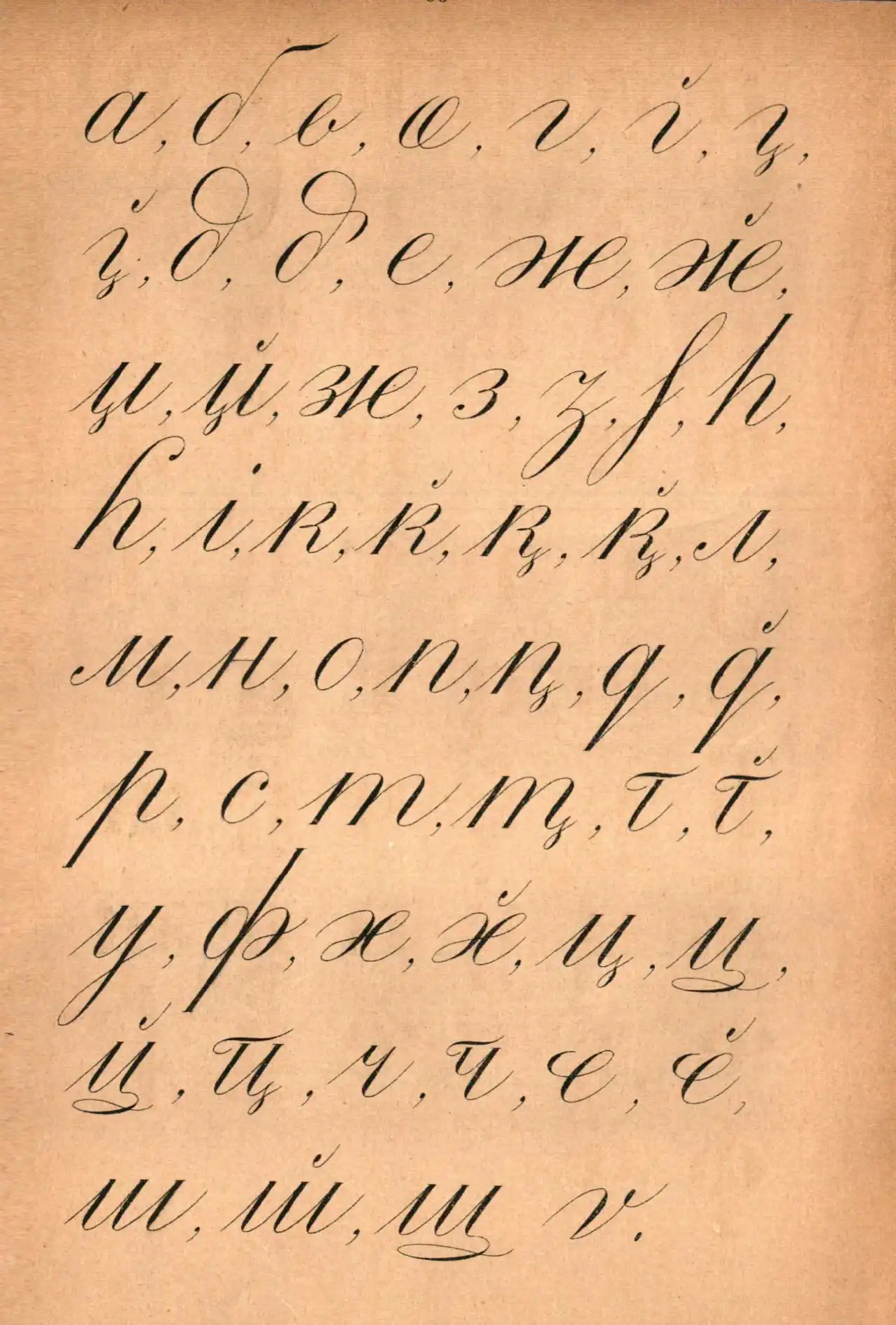
Cursive Abkhaz alphabet of Chochua 1909.

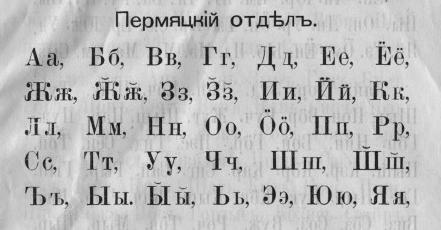
Komi alpahbet of Nicolaes Witsen 1897.

== Computing codes ==
The sha with breve can be represented with the following Unicode characters:

Character information
Preview	Ш		ш		̆	
Unicode name	CYRILLIC CAPITAL LETTER SHA		CYRILLIC SMALL LETTER SHA		COMBINING BREVE	
Encodings	decimal	hex	dec	hex	dec	hex
Unicode	1064	U+0428	1096	U+0448	774	U+0306
UTF-8	208 168	D0 A8	209 136	D1 88	204 134	CC 86
Numeric character reference	&#1064;	&#x428;	&#1096;	&#x448;	&#774;	&#x306;
Named character reference	&SHcy;		&shcy;			
KOI8-R and KOI8-U	251	FB	219	DB		
Code page 855	246	F6	245	F5		
Code page 866	152	98	232	E8		
Windows-1251	216	D8	248	F8		
ISO-8859-5	200	C8	232	E8		
Macintosh Cyrillic	152	98	248	F8		
