= Old Permic (Unicode block) =

- Range: U+10350..U+1037F (48 code points)
- Plane: SMP
- Scripts: Old Permic
- Major alphabets: Old Permic alphabet
- Assigned: 43 code points
- Unused: 5 reserved code points

Unicode version history
- 7.0 (2014): 43 (+43)

Unicode documentation
- Code chart ∣ Web page

Old Permic is a Unicode block containing Old Permic characters for writing the Komi language.

== Block ==
Old Permic^{[1]}^{[2]} Official Unicode Consortium code chart (PDF)
	0	1	2	3	4	5	6	7	8	9	A	B	C	D	E	F
U+1035x	𐍐	𐍑	𐍒	𐍓	𐍔	𐍕	𐍖	𐍗	𐍘	𐍙	𐍚	𐍛	𐍜	𐍝	𐍞	𐍟
U+1036x	𐍠	𐍡	𐍢	𐍣	𐍤	𐍥	𐍦	𐍧	𐍨	𐍩	𐍪	𐍫	𐍬	𐍭	𐍮	𐍯
U+1037x	𐍰	𐍱	𐍲	𐍳	𐍴	𐍵	𐍶	𐍷	𐍸	𐍹	𐍺					
Notes: 1. As of Unicode version 16.0; 2. Grey areas indicate non-assigned code points

== History ==
The following Unicode-related documents record the purpose and process of defining specific characters in the Old Permic block:

Version	Final code points (Note: Proposed code points and characters names may differ from final code points and names)	Count	L2 ID	WG2 ID	Document
7.0	U+10350..1037A	43	L2/98-034	N1687	Everson, Michael (1998-01-18), Draft proposal to encode Old Permic in Plane 1 of ISO/IEC 10646
7.0	U+10350..1037A	43	L2/98-286	N1703	Umamaheswaran, V. S.; Ksar, Mike (1998-07-02), "8.19", Unconfirmed Meeting Minutes, WG 2 Meeting #34, Redmond, WA, USA; 1998-03-16--20
7.0	U+10350..1037A	43	L2/99-064	N1947	Everson, Michael (1999-01-29), Revised proposal for encoding the Old Permic script in the UCS
7.0	U+10350..1037A	43	L2/12-025	N4177	Everson, Michael (2012-01-24), Proposal for encoding the Old Permic script in the SMP of the UCS
7.0	U+10350..1037A	43	L2/12-137	N4263	Everson, Michael (2012-04-26), Revised proposal for encoding the Old Permic script in the SMP of the UCS
7.0	U+10350..1037A	43	L2/12-112		Moore, Lisa (2012-05-17), "C.12", UTC #131 / L2 #228 Minutes
