= Komi alphabets =

Alphabets of the Komi language

The Komi language, a Uralic language spoken in the north-eastern part of European Russia, has been written in several different alphabets. Currently, Komi writing uses letters from the Cyrillic script. There have been five distinct stages in the history of Komi writing:

- 14th to 17th centuries — Anbur, the original graphic system;
- 18th century to 1918 — based on the early Cyrillic alphabet;
- 1918 to 1932 and 1936 to 1938 — Vasily Molodtsov's alphabet based on the modified Cyrillic alphabet;
- 1932 to 1936 — Latinization of the alphabet;
- since 1938 — modern script based on the Cyrillic alphabet.

The Komi-Zyryan and Komi-Permyak sub-languages have used the same writing throughout almost all of their written history (except for the end of the 19th - beginning of the 20th centuries).

== Anbur ==
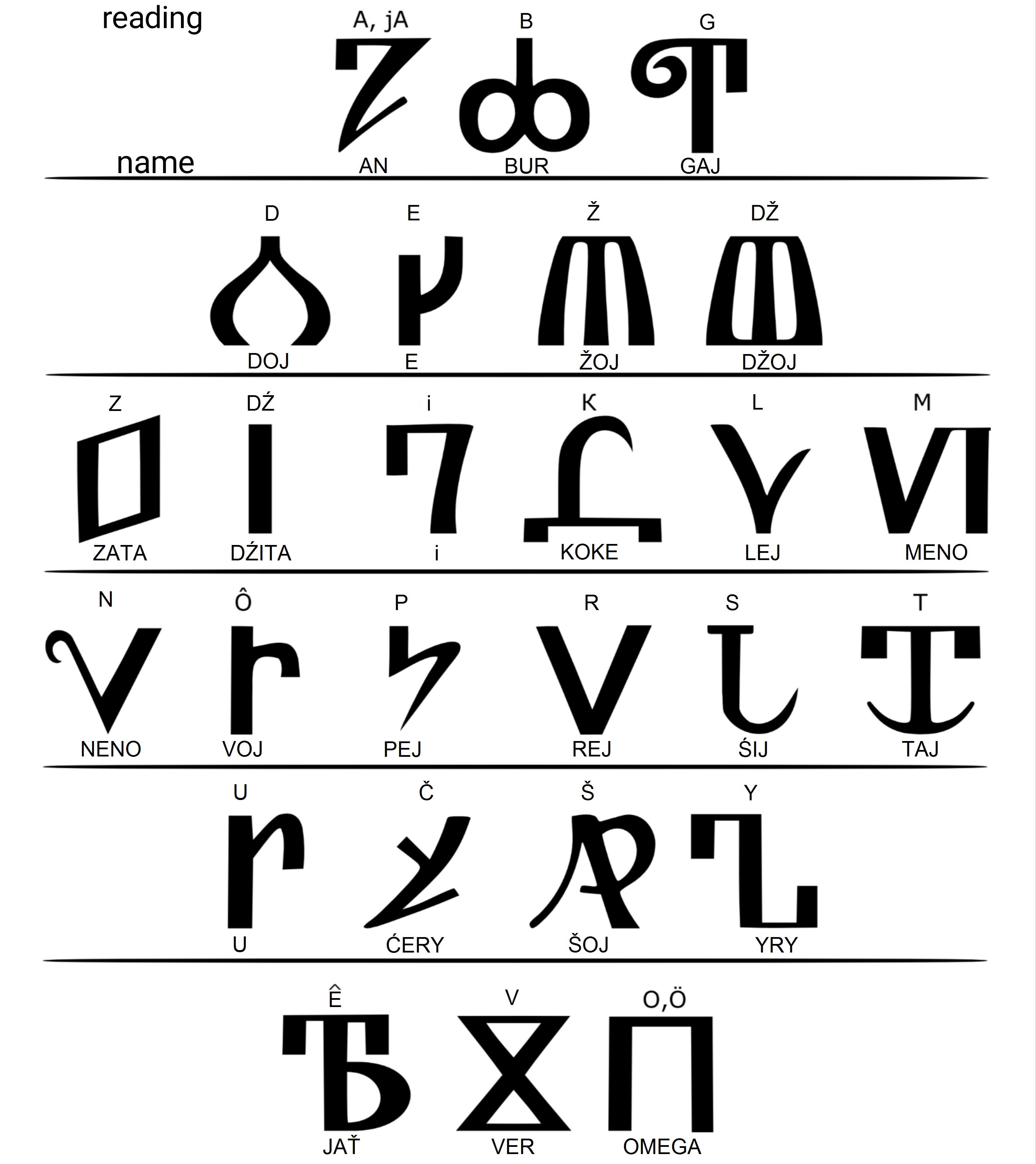
Anbur with transcription in Roman script

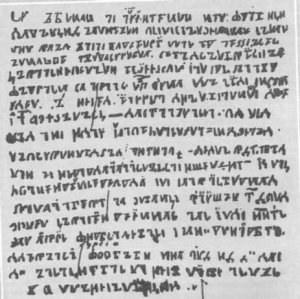
Anbur

The first writing for the Komi language was compiled by the missionary Stefan of Perm around 1372–1375. This writing was created for the needs of the Christianization of the Komi Territory. It is believed that when choosing the type of letters Stefan of Perm was guided by both the Greek and Cyril alphabet, and the traditional Komi tribal characters — Pas (generic characters). This writing was called An-Bur (by the name of the first two letters of the alphabet).

To this day, several icons with inscriptions in Anbur have survived (for example, the Zyryan Trinity), as well as a number of handwritten lines in books. The total volume of preserved coherent texts on the embankment is 236 words.

== Early Cyrillic based writing ==
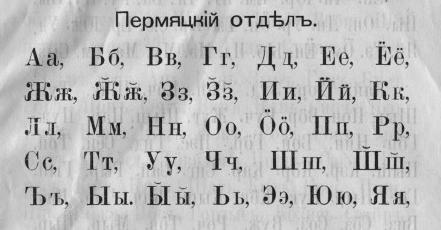
Komi-Permian alphabet from the ABC book of 1897

Starting from the 18th century, separate publications of Komi texts appear both in the Latin alphabet and in the Cyrillic alphabet. So, in the second edition of Nicolaes Witsen’s book “Noord en Oost Tartarye” (Northern and Eastern Tataria), published in 1705, a translation of the prayer “Our Father” into the Komi language, written in Latin, was published.

In 1787–1789, in the book of Peter Simon Pallas “Comparative Dictionary of All Languages and Adverbs”, about 200 words were published in the Komi language in Cyrillic.

In 1808, students of the Vologda Theological Seminary Philip Kozlov compiled the first grammar of the Komi-Zyryan language. It used the alphabet based on the Cyrillic alphabet: А а, Б б, В в, Г г, Д д, Е е, Ж ж, З з, И и, І і, К к, Л л, М м, Н н, О о, Ӧ ӧ, П п, Р р, С с, Т т, У у, Ч ч, Ӵ ӵ, Ш ш, ъ, Ы ы, ь, Ю ю, Я я. This grammar has not been published. In 1813, on the basis of this grammar, the teacher of the same seminary, A. F. Flerov, released the first printed Komi grammar - “Zyryan Grammar, Published from the Main Directorate of Schools”.

In the 1820s and 1950s, a whole series of Komi grammars and dictionaries were published that used various Komi language recording systems, both Cyrillic (P.I.Savvaitov, Anders Sjögren) and Latinized (Matthias Castrén).

In the second half of the 19th century, on the basis of previously created grammars, two main systems for recording the Komi language developed. So, in the works of G.S.Lytkin, in addition to standard Russian letters, the signs ӧ, j, the ligatures ԫ, ꚉ were used, and the softness of the consonants was indicated by a diacritic grave sign. For a number of other authors, the softness of consonants was indicated by the addition of the sign ј.

In the last years of the 19th century, the active publication of Alphabet book in the Komi-Zyryan and Komi-Permyak languages begins. These primers were compiled by different authors and they used different versions of the Komi Cyrillic alphabet.

The differences between the alphabets of the Komi primers of the 19th — early 20th centuries from the modern alphabet:

- Komi-Zyryan
  - Popov A. "The ABC for the Zyryansky youth, or the easiest way for the Zyryans to learn Russian literacy." St. Petersburg, 1865. There are no letters Ё ё, Й й. There are Ԫ ԫ, Ꚉ ꚉ, Ч̇ ч̇, Ъі ъі, Ѣ ѣ, Јі јі, Јо јо, Јӧ јӧ, Јы јы, Ѳ ѳ, Ѵ ѵ.
  - "The alphabet for Zyryan-Izhem living in the Pechersk district of the Arkhangelsk Governorate." Arkhangelsk, 1895. The letters Ѣ ѣ, Ѳ ѳ are present.
  - Lytkin G.S. "The Primer Zyryansk-Russian-Church Slavonic." SPb, 1900. There are no letters Ё ё, И и, Ф ф, Х х, Ц ц, Щ щ, Ъ ъ, Ь ь, Э э, Ю ю, Я я. There are д̀, з̀, ј, л̀, н̀, с̀, т̀, ч̀.
- Komi-Permyak
  - "Выддемъ пермякъ понда" Perm, 1894. There is no letter Ӧ ӧ. There are Ѣ ѣ, Ѳ ѳ.
  - "ABC-book for (northeastern, Yinven) Permyaks" Kazan, 1897. There are no letters І і, Ф ф, Х х, Ц ц, Щ щ. There are Ӂ ӂ, З̆ з̆, Ш̆ ш̆, Ы̆ ы̆.
  - "ABC-book for the Permyaks of the Ivensky region" Kazan, 1899. There are no letters І і, Ц ц, Щ щ. Present Ӂ ӂ, З̆ з̆, йи, Ӵ ӵ, ъи, Ѳ ѳ.
  - "ABC-book for the (northeastern, Yinven) Permyaks" Kazan, 1900. There are no letters І і, Ф ф, Х х, Ц ц, Щ щ. There are Ӂ ӂ, З̆ з̆, Ӵ ӵ, Ы̆ ы̆.
  - Popov E. “Выддемъ коми отиръ челядь понда” Kazan, 1904. There are no letters Ӧ ӧ, Ф ф, Х х, Ц ц, Щ щ. Present д̅з̅, д̅ж̅, ч̅ш̅, Ѣ ѣ, Ӭ ӭ.
  - Moshegov Kondratiy Mikhailovich. “ABC-book for Permyaks children (in the Cherdyn dialect)”. Kazan, 1908. There are no letters Ъ ъ, Ь ь. There are Ӝ ӝ, Ӟ ӟ, Ӵ ӵ, Ѳ ѳ.

Due to the lack of a standard alphabet and the insignificance of editions in the Komi language (about 60-70 books and brochures in Komi were published in 1813-1914), these alphabets did not receive significant distribution among the population.

== Molodtsov alphabet ==
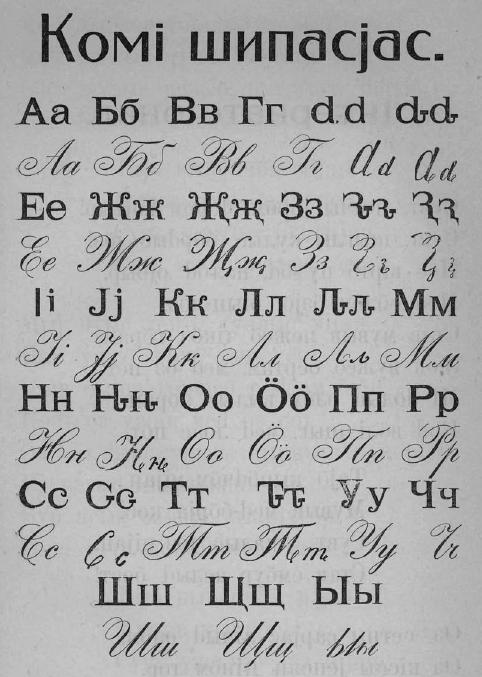
Molodtsov's alphabet from the ABC-book of 1926

The Molodtsov alphabet (Komi: Молодцов анбур, Molodcov anbur) was based on the Cyrillic alphabet, but had a number of specific letters to indicate soft consonants and affricates. It was used to write both the Komi-Zyrian and Komi-Permyak versions of the language, but active publishing of printed materials using the alphabet did not begin until 1921 due to the lack of necessary typefaces; until then, a modified Russian alphabet was used, compiled by A. A. Zember.

The letters particular to the Cyrillic Molodtsov alphabet were: Ԁ Ԃ Ԅ Ԇ Ԉ Ԋ Ԍ Ԏ (the hooks represent palatalization).

The Molodtsov alphabet
А а	Б б	В в	Г г	Ԁ ԁ	Ԃ ԃ	Е е	Ж ж	Җ җ	З з	Ԅ ԅ
Ԇ ԇ	І і	Ј ј	К к	Л л	Ԉ ԉ	М м	Н н	Ԋ ԋ	О о	Ӧ ӧ
П п	Р р	С с	Ԍ ԍ	Т т	Ԏ ԏ	У у	Ч ч	Ш ш	Щ щ	Ы ы

In addition, the letters Ф ф, Х х, and Ц ц might be used for words borrowed from Russian.

=== Background ===
In 1918, the sphere of use of the Komi language expanded significantly; teaching was introduced in schools, and local newspapers began to publish separate articles in the language. Under these conditions, the need arose to create a permanent alphabet and develop spelling norms.

From May to June 1918, a meeting of teachers was held in Ust-Sysolsk, at which teacher Vasily Molodtsov acquainted the meeting participants with his draft alphabet for the Komi language, which was approved in August of the same year at a meeting of teachers in Ust-Vym.

Despite the merits of this alphabet (strict phonemic, economical writing), it also had a number of drawbacks, mainly the complexity of the handwriting due to the special form of characters for soft consonants. It was abandoned and replaced by the Latin alphabet in 1931.

== Writing after 1932 ==
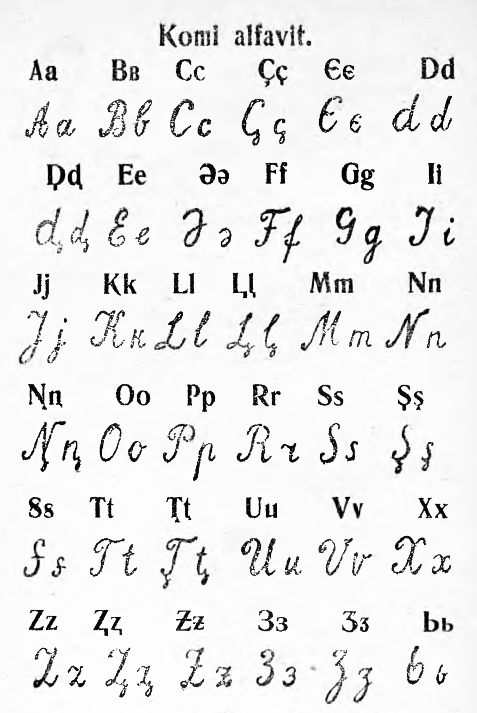
Latinized Komi alphabet (Note: In a number of early publications in the Latin alphabet (1932), instead of S̷ s̷, the sign ʕ ſ was used, and instead of Ӡ ӡ - Ҙ ҙ)

Back in 1924, Professor A.N. Gren proposed translating the Komi script on a Latinized basis. According to his design, the alphabet should include the following letters: A a, B b, D d, Dj dj, E e, G g, Zs zs, Dzs dzs, I i, J j, K k, L l, Lj lj, M m, N n, Nj nj, O o, Ö ö, P p, R r, S s, Sj sj, Sch sch, Cs cs, Csj csj, T t, Tj tj, U u, V v, Y y, Z z, Zj zj, Dz dz. At that time, few supported Gren, but at that time an active process of the Latinization of writing began in the USSR, and soon this question was raised again. In 1929, at the Komi Linguistic Conference of Glavnauka, a resolution was adopted on the need to switch to the Latinized alphabet, using the experience of Latinizing the Turkic scripts of the peoples of the USSR. In September 1930, the Bureau of the Komi Regional Committee of the All-Union Communist Party of Bolsheviks (Bolsheviks) formally decided to translate the Komi script into Latin. The alphabet itself was approved in November 1931, after which the transfer of paperwork, education and publishing to a new script began. This process was generally completed in 1934.

The Latin Komi alphabet essentially became a transliteration of the youthful alphabet — it retained strict phonemicity, the designation of soft consonants by adding a “tail" (descender) to the letter, and special signs for affricates. Thus, both the advantages and disadvantages of the previous alphabet were preserved.

The change in the political situation in the USSR in the mid-1930s led to the abandonment of the Latinized Komi alphabet — the country began the process of cyrillization. Regarding the writing of Komi, this resulted in a rejection of the Latin alphabet in 1936. Instead, Molodtsov's alphabet was restored, but in 1938 it was replaced by a new version of the Cyrillic alphabet, much more similar to the Russian script.

For the Komi-Permyak language in May 1937, the district alphabetical commission approved an alphabet authored by V. I. Yakimov containing all 33 letters of the Russian alphabet plus the additional letters Җ җ, Ҙ ҙ, І і, Ӧ ӧ, Ӹ ӹ. Another 1937 proposal by A. N. Zubov was as follows: А а, Б б, В в, Г г, Д д, Е е, Ж ж, Ж̓ ж̓, З з, З̓ з̓, И и, Й й, К к, Л л, М м, Н н, О о, П п, Р р, С с, Т т, У у, Ф ф, Х х, Ц ц, Ч ч, Ш ш, Щ щ, Ы ы, Э э, Ю ю, Я я, Ь ь, Ё ё.

In July 1937, the Yakimov alphabet was discussed at the Leningrad branch of the Institute of Language and Writing, where it underwent some changes — Ә ә, Җ җ, Ҙ ҙ, І і, Ӵ ӵ were added to the 33 letters of the Russian alphabet. However, a few days later the Central Institute of Language and Writing in Moscow recommended replacing the letters Җ җ, Ҙ ҙ, Ӵ ӵ with the digraphs дж, дз, тш respectively. In the final version of the alphabet, the sign Ә ә was replaced by Ӧ ӧ and the alphabet was as follows: А а, Б б, В в, Г г, Д д, Е е, Ж ж, З з, И и, Й й, К к, Л л, М м, Н н, О о, П п, Р р, С с, Т т, У у, Ф ф, Х х, Ц ц, Ч ч, Ш ш, Щ щ, Ъ ъ, Ы ы, Ь ь, Э э, Ю ю, Я я, Ё ё, І і, Ӧ ӧ.

== Modern alphabet ==
The modern alphabet for the Komi-Zyryan and Komi-Permyak languages was introduced in 1938. It consists of 35 letters: 23 consonants and 12 vowels, containing all the letters of the post-reform Russian alphabet in order, in addition to the signs Ӧ ӧ and І і. Three digraphs, дж, дз and тш, are used to indicate affricates, but are rarely included as separate letters in the alphabet.

The letter І і ("hard І і") is used after the letters д, з, л, н, с, т to denote their hardness (before "ordinary" И, they are soft). The letter Ӧ ӧ denotes the close-mid central unrounded vowel. The softness of the consonants is indicated by the soft sign (Ь ь) following them.

=== Letters of the modern Komi alphabet ===
(see below for IPA pronunciations)

А а	Б б	В в	Г г	Д д	Е е	Ё ё
Ж ж	З з	И и	І і	Й й	К к	Л л
М м	Н н	О о	Ӧ ӧ	П п	Р р	С с
Т т	У у	Ф ф	Х х	Ц ц	Ч ч	Ш ш
Щ щ	Ъ ъ	Ы ы	Ь ь	Э э	Ю ю	Я я

=== Vowel sounds ===
—	Front	Central	Back
Close	и, і	ы	ю, у
Mid	э, е	ӧ	ё, о
Open		я, а	

=== Komi-Yazva alphabet ===
The Komi-Yazva language, long considered one of the dialects of the Komi-Permian language, received its original alphabet only in the early 2000s, when the first primer was published on it. The alphabet of this publication includes all the letters of the Russian alphabet plus the specific characters Ӧ ӧ, Ө ө, Ӱ ӱ, as well as digraphs дж, дч, тш. A later Russian-Komi-Yazvin dictionary contains an alphabet that has І і in addition to the 33 Russian letters and the specific characters from the aforementioned primer. Moreover, affricates are indicated by combinations of letters дз, дж, тш (but are not considered separate letters in this edition) and the letter ч.

Publications in the Izhem dialect of the Komi language use standard Komi writing.

== Comparison of alphabets and IPA ==
Komi alphabets
Anbur		Cyrillic of Castren- Savvaitov (19th c.)	Cyrillic of Sjögren (19th c.)	Molodtsov Cyrillic	Project of alphabet of the professor A. N. Gren	Latin 1930—1936	Modern Cyrillic (since 1938)	IPA
	𐍐	а	а	а	A a	a	а	[a]
	𐍑	б	б	б	B b	b	б	[b]
	𐍮	в	в	в	V v	v	в	[v]
	𐍒	г	г	г	G g	g	г	[g]
	𐍓	д	д	ԁ	D d	d	д	[d]
		дј	д̀	ԃ	Dj dj	безрамки	д (palatal)	[ɟ]
	𐍖	дж	дж	җ	Dzs dzs	з	дж	[d͡ʒ]
	𐍘	дз	дз	ԇ	Dz dz	ӡ	дз	[d͡ʑ]
				је		je	е	[je]
				јо		jo	ё	[jo]
	𐍕	ж	ж	ж	Zs zs	ƶ	ж	[ʒ]
	𐍗	з	з	з	Z z	z	з	[z]
		зј	з̀	ԅ	Zj zj	ⱬ	з (palatal)	[ʑ]
	𐍙	і	і	і	I i	i	и, і	[i]
	𐍙	ј	ј	ј	J j	j	й	[j]
	𐍚	к	к	к	K k	k	к	[k]
	𐍛	л	л	л	L l	l	л	[ɫ]
		лј	л̀	ԉ	Lj lj	безрамки	л (palatal)	[ʎ]
	𐍜	м	м	м	M m	m	м	[m]
	𐍝	н	н	н	N n	n	н	[n]
		нј	н̀	ԋ	Nj nj	ꞑ	н (palatal)	[ɲ]
	𐍩	о	о	о	O o	o	o	[o]
	𐍩	ӧ	ӧ	ӧ	Ö ö	ə	ӧ	[ɘ]
	𐍟	п	п	п	P p	p	п	[p]
	𐍠	р	р	р	R r	r	р	[r]
	𐍡	с	с	с	S s	s	с	[s]
		сј	с̀	ԍ	Sj sj	безрамки	с (palatal)	[ɕ]
	𐍢	т	т	т	T t	t	т	[t]
		тј	т̀	ԏ	Tj tj	безрамки	т (palatal)	[c]
	𐍣	у	у	у	U u	u	у	[u]
	𐍫				F f	f	ф	[f], [p]
	𐍬				H h	x	х	[x], [k]
					C c	c	ц	[t͡s], [t͡ɕ]
	𐍤	ч	ч	щ	Cs cs	(Note: Sometimes approximated as c̴)	тш	[t͡ʃ]
		чј	ч̀	ч	Csj csj	безрамки	ч	[t͡ɕ]
	𐍥	ш	ш	ш	Sch sch	ꞩ	ш	[ʃ]
	𐍦						щ	[ɕː]
	𐍯						ъ	[◌.]
	𐍨	ы	ы	ы	Y y	безрамки	ы	[ɨ]
	𐍰						ь	[◌ʲ]
,	𐍔, 𐍱	е	е	е	E e	e	э	[e]
	𐍳			ју		ju	ю	[ju]
,	𐍴, 𐍵			ја		ja	я	[ja]
