= Je with belt =

Cyrillic letter

Usage
- Writing system: Cyrillic
- Type: Alphabetic
- Sound values: [jɪ̞], [ɪ̞]

History
- Development: Ј ј

Je with belt, also called Bashkir Ye, is an additional letter of the Cyrillic script that was used in the Bashkir alphabet of Mstislav Aleksandrovich Kulayev in 1912.

== Computing codes ==
This letter has not been encoded in Unicode yet.

== Sources ==
- Кулаев, М.А. (1912). Основы звуко-произношения и азбука для башкир (in Russian). Казань.
- Кулаев, М.А. (2010). "о звуках и алфавите башкирского языка". Педагогический журнал Башкортостана (in Russian). 2 (27).
- Әхмәров, Ҡ. З. (2012). Башҡорт яҙыуы тарихынан (2 1500 экз ed.) (in Bashkir). Китап. ISBN 978-5-295-05619-2.

== See also ==
- Ј ј - Cyrillic letter Je
- Е е - Cyrillic letter Ye
- Bashkir language
- Cyrillic script
