= Pe with middle hook =

Cyrillic letter from Abkhaz

- Ҧ ҧ

Usage
- Writing system: Cyrillic
- Type: Alphabetic
- Sound values: /pʰ/
- In Unicode: U+04A6, U+04A7

Pe with middle hook (Ҧ ҧ; italics: Ҧ ҧ) is a letter of the Cyrillic script. Its form is derived from the Cyrillic letter Pe (П п) by the addition of a hook to the middle of the right leg.

Pe with middle hook was formerly used in the Abkhaz language, where it represented the aspirated voiceless bilabial plosive /pʰ/, like the pronunciation of ⟨p⟩ in "pack". It was the 36th letter of the alphabet, until it was replaced by ⟨Ԥ⟩.

== Computing codes ==
Character information
Preview	Ҧ		ҧ	
Unicode name	CYRILLIC CAPITAL LETTER; PE WITH MIDDLE HOOK		CYRILLIC SMALL LETTER; PE WITH MIDDLE HOOK	
Encodings	decimal	hex	dec	hex
Unicode	1190	U+04A6	1191	U+04A7
UTF-8	210 166	D2 A6	210 167	D2 A7
Numeric character reference	&#1190;	&#x4A6;	&#1191;	&#x4A7;

== See also ==
- Cyrillic characters in Unicode
