= Pe with descender =

Cyrillic letter used for /pʰ/ in Abkhaz

- Ԥ ԥ

Usage
- Writing system: Cyrillic
- Type: Alphabetic
- Sound values: /pʰ/

Pe with descender (Ԥ ԥ; italics: Ԥ ԥ) is a letter of the Cyrillic script. It is used in the alphabet of the Abkhaz language, where it represents the aspirated consonant /pʰ/, like the pronunciation of ⟨p⟩ in "pack", replacing the now-obsolete letter ⟨Ҧ⟩.

== In modern Runet culture ==
This letter can be a euphemism for the obscene word "пиздец" (a total disaster, failure). It is basically a contraction of the letters П and Ц, the first and the last letters of the word.

== Related letters and other similar characters ==
- П п : Cyrillic letter Pe
- Ҧ ҧ : Cyrillic letter Pe with middle hook
- Ṕ ṕ : Latin letter P with acute

== Computing codes ==
Character information
| Preview | Ԥ | | ԥ | |
|---|---|---|---|---|
| Unicode name | CYRILLIC CAPITAL LETTER; PE WITH DESCENDER | | CYRILLIC SMALL LETTER; PE WITH DESCENDER | |
| Encodings | decimal | hex | dec | hex |
| Unicode | 1316 | U+0524 | 1317 | U+0525 |
| UTF-8 | 212 164 | D4 A4 | 212 165 | D4 A5 |
| Numeric character reference | &#1316; | &#x524; | &#1317; | &#x525; |

== See also ==
- Cyrillic characters in Unicode
