= Komi Zje =

Letter of the Cyrillic script

- Ԅ ԅ

Usage
- Writing system: Cyrillic
- Type: Alphabetic
- Sound values: [zʲ]

Komi Zje (Ԅ ԅ; italics: Ԅ ԅ) is a letter of the Molodtsov alphabet, a version of Cyrillic. It was used only in the writing of the Komi language.

The pronunciation of the letter is [zʲ] (palatalized voiced alveolar sibilant).

== Computing codes ==
Character information
Preview	Ԅ		ԅ	
Unicode name	CYRILLIC CAPITAL LETTER; KOMI ZJE		CYRILLIC SMALL LETTER; KOMI ZJE	
Encodings	decimal	hex	dec	hex
Unicode	1284	U+0504	1285	U+0505
UTF-8	212 132	D4 84	212 133	D4 85
Numeric character reference	&#1284;	&#x504;	&#1285;	&#x505;

== See also ==
- З́ з́ : Cyrillic letter Zje
- З з : Cyrillic letter Ze
- Cyrillic characters in Unicode
