= Komi Tje =

Letter of the Cyrillic script

- Ԏ ԏ

Usage
- Writing system: Cyrillic
- Type: Alphabetic
- Sound values: /c/

Komi Tje (Ԏ ԏ; italics: Ԏ ԏ) is a letter of the Molodtsov alphabet, a variant of Cyrillic. It was used only in the writing of the Komi language in the 1920s–1940s.

== Computing codes ==
Character information
Preview	Ԏ		ԏ	
Unicode name	CYRILLIC CAPITAL LETTER; KOMI TJE		CYRILLIC SMALL LETTER; KOMI TJE	
Encodings	decimal	hex	dec	hex
Unicode	1294	U+050E	1295	U+050F
UTF-8	212 142	D4 8E	212 143	D4 8F
Numeric character reference	&#1294;	&#x50E;	&#1295;	&#x50F;

== See also ==
- Т т : Cyrillic letter Te
- Ћ ћ : Cyrillic letter Tshe (Tje)
- Cyrillic characters in Unicode
