= Dzzhe =

Cyrillic letter

- Ԫ ԫ

Usage
- Writing system: Cyrillic
- Type: Alphabetic
- Language of origin: Komi, Ossetian, Udmurt, Yakut
- Sound values: [d͡ʒ]
- In Unicode: U+052A

History
- Time period: 1895-1954

Other
- Writing direction: Left-to-right

Dzzhe (Ԫ ԫ; italics: Ԫ ԫ) is a letter of the Cyrillic script. The shape of the letter originated as a ligature of the Cyrillic letters De (Д д Д д) and Zhe (Ж ж Ж ж).

Dzzhe is used in the old Komi and Ossetic languages, as well as in Grigoriy Vereshchagin's 1895 Udmurt alphabet. It was later abandoned. It was also used in D. V. Khitrov's Yakut alphabet from 1858 to 1917, corresponding to Дь.

It is used to distinguish the affricate /d͜ʒ/ from the sequence d-ž in some phonetic dictionaries.

== Usage ==
This letter represents the voiced palato-alveolar affricate /d͡ʒ/ (j as in jam). It can be romanized as ⟨dž⟩.

== Computing codes ==
Character information
Preview	Ԫ		ԫ	
Unicode name	CYRILLIC CAPITAL LETTER; DZZHE		CYRILLIC SMALL LETTER; DZZHE	
Encodings	decimal	hex	dec	hex
Unicode	1322	U+052A	1323	U+052B
UTF-8	212 170	D4 AA	212 171	D4 AB
Numeric character reference	&#1322;	&#x52A;	&#1323;	&#x52B;

== See also ==
- Cyrillic characters in Unicode
- Џ џ: Cyrillic letter Dzhe
- Ҷ ҷ: Cyrillic letter Che with descender
