= Komi Lje =

Letter of the Cyrillic script

- Ԉ ԉ

Usage
- Writing system: Cyrillic
- Type: Alphabetic
- Language of origin: Komi
- Sound values: [ʎ]

Komi Lje (Ԉ ԉ; italics: Ԉ ԉ) is a letter of the Molodtsov alphabet, a variant of Cyrillic. It was used only in the writing of the Komi language. It is equivalent to the Cyrillic letter Lje (Љ љ). Some of its forms are similar to the Chinese character 几.

== Computing codes ==
Character information
| Preview | Ԉ | | ԉ | |
|---|---|---|---|---|
| Unicode name | CYRILLIC CAPITAL LETTER KOMI LJE | | CYRILLIC SMALL LETTER KOMI LJE | |
| Encodings | decimal | hex | dec | hex |
| Unicode | 1288 | U+0508 | 1289 | U+0509 |
| UTF-8 | 212 136 | D4 88 | 212 137 | D4 89 |
| Numeric character reference | &#1288; | &#x508; | &#1289; | &#x509; |

== See also ==
- Л л : Cyrillic letter El
- Cyrillic characters in Unicode
