= Komi Nje =

Letter of the Cyrillic script

- Ԋ ԋ

Usage
- Writing system: Cyrillic
- Type: Alphabetic
- Sound values: /ɲ/

Komi Nje (Ԋ ԋ; italics: Ԋ ԋ) is a letter of the Molodtsov alphabet, a variant of Cyrillic. It was used only in the writing of the Komi language in the 1920s.

Its form is similar to the Latin letter Hwair (⟨Ƕ ƕ⟩), but the lowercase form is a small version of the capital letter. Komi Nje represents the palatal nasal /ɲ/, somewhat like the pronunciation of ⟨ni⟩ in "onion". It corresponds to the Cyrillic letter Nje (Њ њ), and to the Latin digraph Ǌ (Ǌ ǋ ǌ) used in the Croatian and Serbian languages.

== Computing codes ==
Character information
Preview	Ԋ		ԋ	
Unicode name	CYRILLIC CAPITAL LETTER; KOMI NJE		CYRILLIC SMALL LETTER; KOMI NJE	
Encodings	decimal	hex	dec	hex
Unicode	1290	U+050A	1291	U+050B
UTF-8	212 138	D4 8A	212 139	D4 8B
Numeric character reference	&#1290;	&#x50A;	&#1291;	&#x50B;

== See also ==
- Н н : Cyrillic letter En
- Њ њ : Cyrillic letter Nje
- Cyrillic characters in Unicode
