= Komi Sje =

Letter of the Cyrillic script

- Ԍ ԍ

Usage
- Writing system: Cyrillic
- Type: Alphabetic
- Language of origin: Komi language
- Sound values: [ɕ]

History
- Development: С с: Ԍ ԍ
- Time period: 1921–1931

Komi Sje (Ԍ ԍ; italics: Ԍ ԍ) is a letter of the Molodtsov alphabet, a version of the Cyrillic alphabet that was used to write the Komi language in the 1920s. It represented the voiceless alveolo-palatal sibilant /ɕ/, somewhat like the pronunciation of ⟨sh⟩ in "sheep".

Although it looks like the Latin letter G (G g G g), it is unrelated and is more related to the Cyrillic letter Es.

== Computing codes ==
Character information
Preview	Ԍ		ԍ	
Unicode name	CYRILLIC CAPITAL LETTER; KOMI SJE		CYRILLIC SMALL LETTER; KOMI SJE	
Encodings	decimal	hex	dec	hex
Unicode	1292	U+050C	1293	U+050D
UTF-8	212 140	D4 8C	212 141	D4 8D
Numeric character reference	&#1292;	&#x50C;	&#1293;	&#x50D;

== See also ==
- С́ с́ : Cyrillic letter Sje
- Ҫ ҫ : Cyrillic letter Es with descender
- Г г : Cyrillic Ge
- Cyrillic characters in Unicode
