= Komi De =

Cyrillic letter formerly used in Komi

- Ԁ ԁ

Usage
- Writing system: Cyrillic
- Type: Alphabetic
- Sound values: [d]

Komi De (Ԁ ԁ; italics: Ԁ ԁ ) is a letter of the Molodtsov alphabet, a version of Cyrillic. It was used in the writing of the Komi language in the 1920s.

The lowercase form resembles the lowercase of the Latin letter D (d d) and its uppercase form resembles a rotated capital Latin letter P or Cyrillic letter Er or a mirrored soft sign.

Komi De represents the voiced dental plosive /d/, like the pronunciation of ⟨d⟩ in "din". This sound is represented by the Cyrillic letter De (Д д) in other Cyrillic alphabets.

== Computing codes ==
Character information
| Preview | Ԁ | | ԁ | |
|---|---|---|---|---|
| Unicode name | CYRILLIC CAPITAL LETTER; KOMI DE | | CYRILLIC SMALL LETTER; KOMI DE | |
| Encodings | decimal | hex | dec | hex |
| Unicode | 1280 | U+0500 | 1281 | U+0501 |
| UTF-8 | 212 128 | D4 80 | 212 129 | D4 81 |
| Numeric character reference | &#1280; | &#x500; | &#1281; | &#x501; |

== See also ==
- Cyrillic characters in Unicode
