= En with middle hook =

Cyrillic letter

- Ԣ ԣ

Usage
- Writing system: Cyrillic
- Type: Alphabetic
- Sound values: /nʲ/

En with middle hook (Ԣ ԣ; italics: Ԣ ԣ) is a letter of the Cyrillic script. Its form is derived from the Cyrillic letter En (Н н) by adding a hook to the middle of the right leg.

En with middle hook was formerly used in the alphabet of the Chuvash language, where it represented the palatalized alveolar nasal /nʲ/.

== Related letters and other similar characters ==
- Н н : Cyrillic letter En
- Ь ь : Cyrillic letter Soft sign
- Ñ ñ : Latin letter N with tilde
- Ń ń : Latin letter N with acute
- Ň ň : Latin letter N with caron
- Љ љ : Cyrillic letter Lje
- Њ њ : Cyrillic letter Nje

== Computing codes ==
Character information
Preview	Ԣ		ԣ	
Unicode name	CYRILLIC CAPITAL LETTER; EN WITH MIDDLE HOOK		CYRILLIC SMALL LETTER; EN WITH MIDDLE HOOK	
Encodings	decimal	hex	dec	hex
Unicode	1314	U+0522	1315	U+0523
UTF-8	212 162	D4 A2	212 163	D4 A3
Numeric character reference	&#1314;	&#x522;	&#1315;	&#x523;

== See also ==
- Cyrillic characters in Unicode
