= Old Permic script =

Alphabet used to write Komi

Old Permic Abur 𐍐𐍝𐍑𐍣𐍠
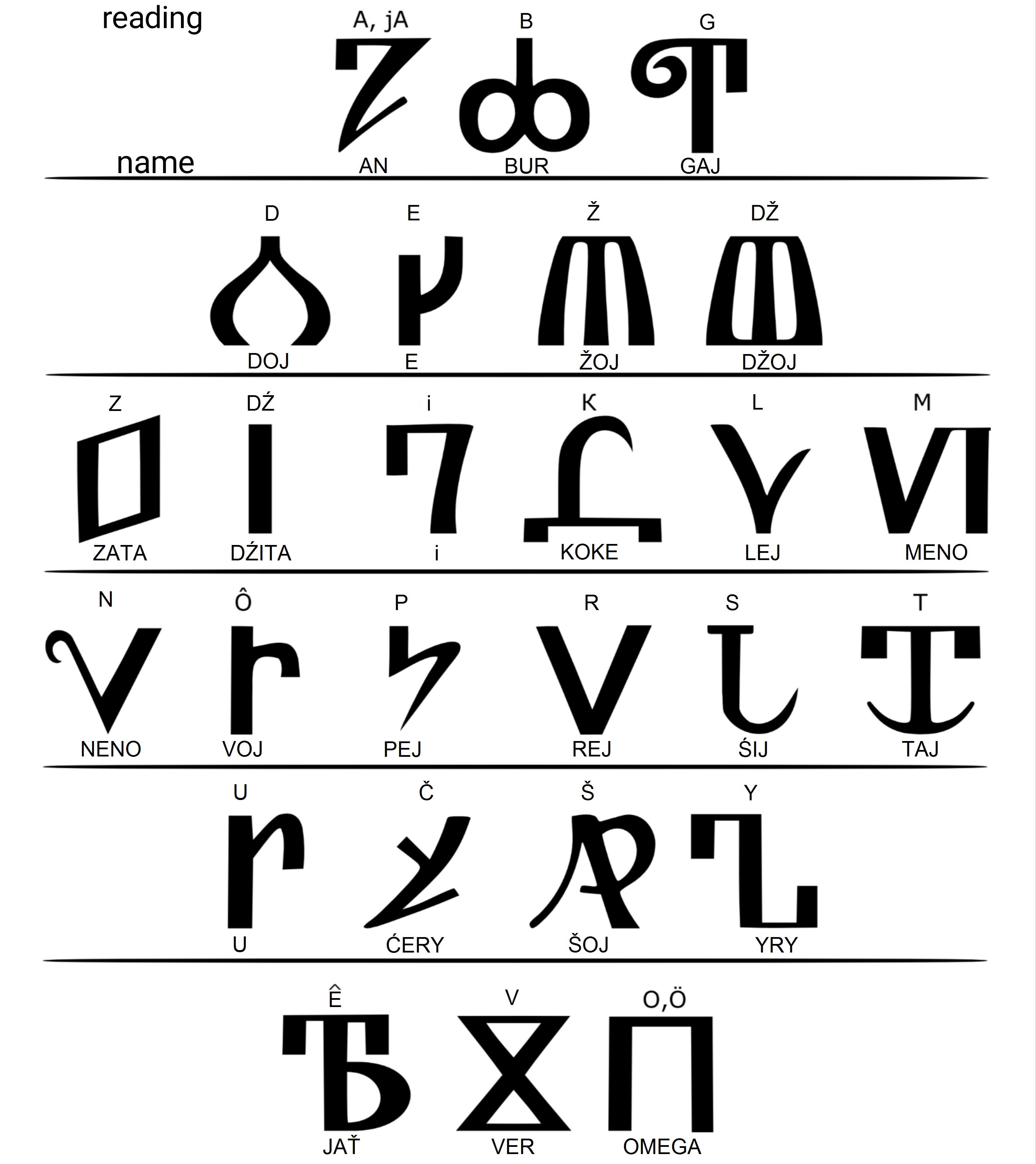
- Komi-Zyryan alphabet, created by Stephen of Perm. The alphabet is transposed with the names in Cyrillic and the modern Komi alphabet.
- Script type: alphabet
- Period: 1372–17th century
- Direction: Left-to-right
- Languages: Komi

Related scripts
- Parent systems: Phoenician: Greek; Cyrillic; Old Permic Abur
- Sister systems: Armenian script

ISO 15924
- ISO 15924: Perm (227), Old Permic

Unicode
- Unicode alias: Old Permic
- Unicode range: U+10350–U+1037F; Final Accepted Script Proposal

The Old Permic script (Komi: Важ Перым гижӧм, 𐍮𐍐𐍕 𐍟𐍔𐍠𐍨𐍜 𐍒𐍙𐍕𐍩𐍜, Važ Perym gižöm), sometimes known by its initial two characters as Abur or Anbur, is a "highly idiosyncratic adaptation" of the Cyrillic script once used to write medieval Komi (a member of the Permic branch of Finno-Ugric languages).

== History ==
The script was introduced by a Russian missionary, Stephen of Perm, in 1372. The name Abur is derived from the names of the first two characters: An and Bur. The script derived from Cyrillic and Greek, with Komi "Rödvužpas" Tamga signs, the latter being similar in the appearance to runes or siglas poveiras because they were created by incisions rather than by usual writing. The inclusion of the latter aided the script to greater acceptance among the medieval Permic speakers of the time.

The script was in use until the 17th century, when it was superseded by the Cyrillic script. Abur was also used as cryptographic writing for the Russian language.

April 26, which is the feast day of Stephen of Perm, is celebrated as Old Permic Alphabet Day.

== Significance ==
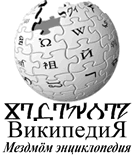
Wikipedia logo in Old Permic and Cyrillic script

The Abur inscriptions are among the oldest relics of the Uralic languages. Only one of them has earlier documents: Hungarian, which had been written using the Old Hungarian script first before the Latin script was used after 1000.

For comparison, an isolated birch bark letter, found in Novgorod and written in Cyrillic in a Finnic language, has been dated to the beginning of the 13th century and Finnish as a written language appeared only after the Reformation in 1543.

== Characters ==
Lytkin's 1952 work is often considered the authoritative source of documentation for this script. There are 24 primary characters, along with 10 secondary characters that are subordinate to the primary characters. There are also some combining marks that may have been used for phonological purposes, in addition to some combining letters from Latin and Cyrillic that have been found as well. Spaces, middle dots, and semi-apostrophes have also been seen as punctuation in documents. A Cyrillic combining titlo is used to indicate numerals.

== Unicode ==
Old Permic (U+10350–1037F) was added to the Unicode Standard in June 2014 with the release of version 7.0.

Old Permic^{[1]}^{[2]} Official Unicode Consortium code chart (PDF)
	0	1	2	3	4	5	6	7	8	9	A	B	C	D	E	F
U+1035x	𐍐	𐍑	𐍒	𐍓	𐍔	𐍕	𐍖	𐍗	𐍘	𐍙	𐍚	𐍛	𐍜	𐍝	𐍞	𐍟
U+1036x	𐍠	𐍡	𐍢	𐍣	𐍤	𐍥	𐍦	𐍧	𐍨	𐍩	𐍪	𐍫	𐍬	𐍭	𐍮	𐍯
U+1037x	𐍰	𐍱	𐍲	𐍳	𐍴	𐍵	𐍶	𐍷	𐍸	𐍹	𐍺					
Notes 1.As of Unicode version 18.0 2.Grey areas indicate non-assigned code points
