= Komi language =

Uralic language spoken in Russia

Komi
- Komi-Zyrian
- коми кыв komi kyv
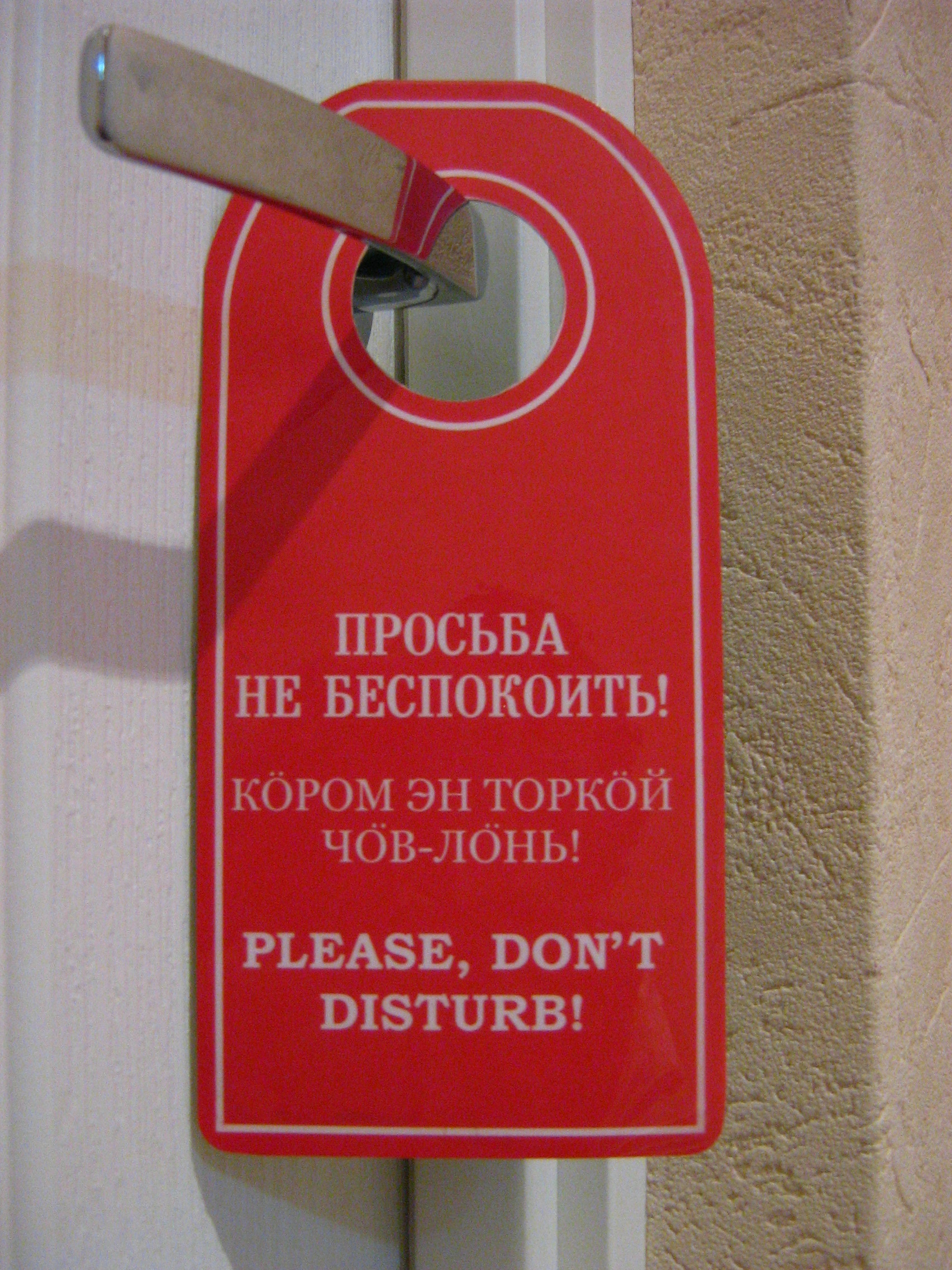
- Trilingual (Russian, Komi, and English) sign in a hotel in Ukhta, Komi Republic
- Pronunciation: [komi kɨv]
- Native to: Russia
- Region: Komi Republic; Nenetsia; Permyakia; Yamalia
- Ethnicity: Komi-Zyryan
- Native speakers: 99,609 (2020 census)
- Language family: Uralic: Permic; Komi; Komi
- Writing system: Cyrillic; Old Permic (historical)

Official status
- Official language in: Russia: Komi Republic

Language codes
- ISO 639-1: kv (for the Komi languages)
- ISO 639-2: kom (for the Komi languages)
- ISO 639-3: kom – inclusive code (for the Komi languages); Individual code: kpv – Komi-Zyryan
- Glottolog: komi1268
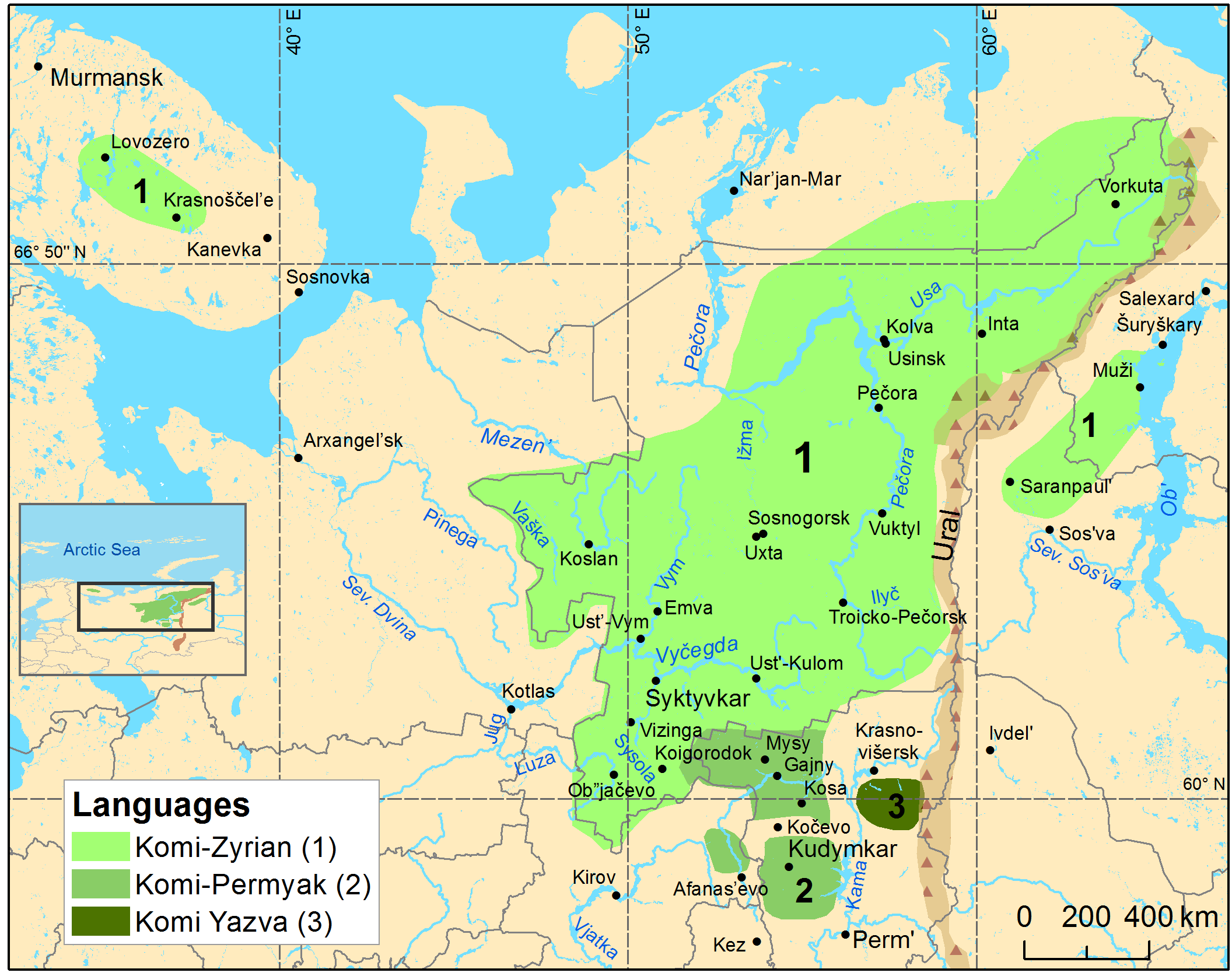
- Traditional distribution of Komi languages

- Komi is classified as "vulnerable" by the UNESCO Atlas of the World's Languages in Danger

Komi (коми кыв, komi kyv, IPA: [komi kɨv]), also known as Zyran, Zyrian or Komi-Zyryan (зыран коми кыв, zyran komi kyv), is the native language of the Komi (Zyrians). It is one of the Permic languages; the other regional varieties are Komi-Permyak, which has official status, and Komi-Yazva.

Komi is spoken in the Komi Republic and other parts of Russia such as Nenetsia and Yamalia. There were 285,000 speakers in 1994, which decreased to 160,000 in 2010.

It was formerly written in the Old Permic script created by Stephen of Perm for liturgical purposes in the 14th century, though very few texts exist in this script. The Cyrillic script was introduced by Russian missionaries in the 17th century, replacing it. A tradition of secular works of literature in the modern form of the language dates back to the 19th century.

== Dialects ==
Komi has ten dialects: Syktyvkardin (Sysola), Lower Ežva (Vychegda), Central Ežva (Vychegda), Upper Ežva (Vychegda), Luz-let, Upper Sysola, Pećöra, Iźva, Vym, and Udora dialects. Syktyvkardin is spoken in the region of Syktyvkar and forms the model for the generic standard dialect of the language. Dialects are divided based primarily on their use of /v/ and /l/:

- Older */l/ remains unchanged in Upper Ežva and Pećöra dialects (also in most dialects of Komi-Permyak).
- In Central dialects, /*l/ changed to /v/ syllable-finally; for instance, in literary Komi */kɨl/ → /kɨv/ "tongue".
- In Northern dialects, changes of /l/ continued with complete vocalization of syllable-final /l/, resulting in long vowels.

The start of the change date to the 17th century. It is not seen in the oldest Komi texts from the 14th century, nor in loanwords from Komi to Khanty, dated to the 16th; though it fully occurred before Russian loanwords that entered the language in the 18th century as /l/ remains unchanged in these.

Some dialects are further distinguished based on the palatalized alveolars /dʲ tʲ/, which have unpacked in syllable-final position as clusters /jd jt/.

== Phonology ==
=== Consonants ===
Consonant phonemes of Zyrian
		Labial	Dental	Post- alveolar	Palatal	Velar
Nasal		m	n		ɲ	
Plosive	voiceless	p	t		c	k
Plosive	voiced	b	d		ɟ	ɡ
Affricate	voiceless			t͡ʃ	t͡ɕ	
Affricate	voiced			d͡ʒ	d͡ʑ	
Fricative	voiceless		s	ʃ	ɕ	
Fricative	voiced	v	z	ʒ	ʑ	
Trill			r			
Approximant	lateral		l		ʎ	
Approximant	central				j	

=== Vowels ===
Vowels
	Front	Central	Back
Close	i	ɨ	u
Mid	e	ə	o
Open		a	

There are no diphthongs, although vowel sequences can occur at morpheme boundaries.

The phoneme /ɨ/ is phonetically [ɯ̈], and /a/ is phonetically [ä]. There is noticeable positional allophony, depending on the surrounding consonants, however no allophone overlaps with another vowel phoneme.

== Writing system ==
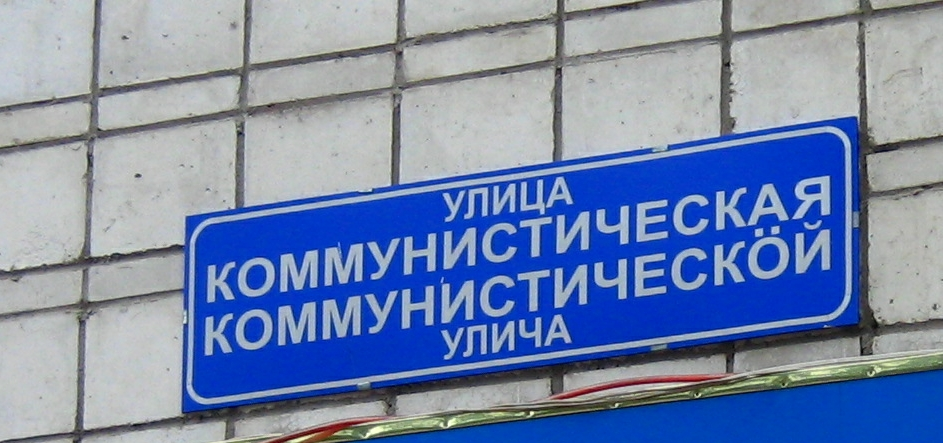
A sample of the Komi language words. Upper "Улица Коммунистическая" (Note: (ulit͡sa kommunističeskaja)) is in Russian, lower "Коммунистическӧй улича" (Note: (kommunističesköj uliča)) is in Komi. Both mean "Communist street". This picture was taken in Syktyvkar, the capital of Komi Republic

The Old Permic script is the first writing system for Komi. It was invented in the 14th century by the missionary Stephen of Perm. The alphabet resembled medieval Greek and Cyrillic. The script was also known as Anbur (Komi: 𐍐𐍝𐍑𐍣𐍠, Анбур), named for the first 2 letters of the script, "an" & "bur" (𐍐 & 𐍑, respectively). It is no longer in use today, though it has received Unicode Support as "Old Permic" in recent times. The script saw use in Komi-inhabited areas, primarily the Principality of Great Perm and parts of Bjarmaland.

In the 16th century, this alphabet was replaced by the Russian alphabet with certain modifications for affricates. In the 1920s, the language was written in the Molodtsov alphabet, which also derived from Cyrillic. In the 1930s, during the Latinisation in the Soviet Union, Komi was briefly written with a version of the Latin script. Since the 1940s it uses the Russian-based Cyrillic alphabet with the additional letters І, і and Ӧ, ӧ.

Komi alphabet (Коми анбур)
Anbur	Cyrillic	Cyrillic (Molodtsov)	Latin	IPA	Letter name	Notes
𐍐	А а		A a	/a/	а	
𐍑	Б б		B b	/b/	бе	
𐍮	В в		V v	/v/	ве	
𐍒	Г г		G g	/g/	ге	
𐍓	Д д	Ԁ ԁ Ԃ ԃ	D d Ď ď	/d/ /ɟ/ before е, ё, и, ю, я, ь	дэ	
𐍖	Дж дж	Җ җ	Dž dž	/dʒ/	дже	
𐍘	Дз дз	Ԇ ԇ	Dź dź	/dʑ/	дзе	
-	Е е	-	Je je E e	/e/ [je] word-initially and after vowels /e/ after /c, ɟ, ɕ, ʑ, ɲ, ʎ/	е	
-	Ё ё	-	Jo jo O o	[jo] word-initially and after vowels /o/ after /c, ɟ, ɕ, ʑ, ɲ, ʎ/	ё	
𐍕	Ж ж		Ž ž	/ʒ/	же	
𐍗	З з	З з Ԅ ԅ	Z z Ź ź	/z/ /ʑ/ before е, ё, и, ю, я, ь	зэ	
𐍙	И и	-	I i	/i/ /i/ after /c, ɟ, ɕ, ʑ, ɲ, ʎ/	небыд и ("soft i")	
𐍙	І і		I i	/i/ after /t, d, s, z, n, l/	чорыд и ("hard i")	Non-palatalizing form of и.
𐍙	Й й	Ј ј	J j	/j/	дженьыд и	
𐍚	К к		K k	/k/	ка	
𐍛	Л л	Л л Ԉ ԉ	L l Ľ ľ	/ɫ/ /ʎ/ before е, ё, и, ю, я, ь	эл	
𐍜	М м		M m	/m/	эм	
𐍝	Н н	Н н Ԋ ԋ	N n Ń ń	/n/ /ɲ/ before е, ё, и, ю, я, ь	эн	
𐍩	О о -		O o -	/o/ /ɔ/	о "open o"	Open "o" is absent in the literary Komi language.
𐍞	Ӧ ӧ		Ö ö	/ɘ/	ӧ	
𐍟	П п		P p	/p/	пе	
𐍠	Р р		R r	/r/	эр	
𐍡	С с	С с Ԍ ԍ	S s Ś ś	/s/ /ɕ/ before е, ё, и, ю, я, ь	эс	
𐍢	Т т	Т т Ԏ ԏ	T t Ť ť	/t/ /c/ before е, ё, и, ю, я, ь	тэ	
𐍤	Тш тш	Щ щ	Č č	/tʃ/	тше	
𐍣	У у		U u	/u/	у	
𐍫	Ф ф	-	F f	/f/	эф	In loanwords.
𐍬	Х х	-	H h	/x/	ха	In loanwords.
𐍭	Ц ц	-	C c	/ts/	це	In loanwords.
-	Ч ч		Ć ć	/tɕ/	че	
𐍥	Ш ш		Š š	/ʃ/	ша	
𐍦	Щ щ	-	Šč šč	/ʃtʃ~ʃː/	ща	In loanwords.
𐍯	Ъ ъ	-	-	-	чорыд пас ("hard sign")	Same usage as Russian.
𐍨	Ы ы		Y y	/ɨ/	ы	
𐍰	Ь ь	-	-	/ʲ/	небыд пас ("soft sign")	Same usage as Russian.
- 𐍔	Э э -	Ее	E e -	/e/ /ɛ/	э "open e"	Non-palatalizing form of "е". Open "e" is absent in the modern Komi language.
𐍳	Ю ю	-	Ju ju U u	[ju] /u/ after /c, ɟ, ɕ, ʑ, ɲ, ʎ/	ю	
𐍴, 𐍵	Я я	-	Ja ja A a	[ja] /a/ after /c, ɟ, ɕ, ʑ, ɲ, ʎ/	я	

Letters particular to the Molodtsov alphabet include ԁ, ԃ, ԅ, ԇ, ԉ, ԋ, ԍ, ԏ, most of which represent palatalized consonants.

The Molodtsov alphabet
А а	Б б	В в	Г г	Ԁ ԁ	Ԃ ԃ	Е е	Ж ж	Җ җ	З з	Ԅ ԅ	Ԇ ԇ
І і	Ј ј	К к	Л л	Ԉ ԉ	М м	Н н	Ԋ ԋ	О о	Ӧ ӧ	П п	Р р
С с	Ԍ ԍ	Т т	Ԏ ԏ	У у	Ф ф	Х х	Ц ц	Ч ч	Ш ш	Щ щ	Ы ы

== Grammar ==
Komi has 17 cases, with a rich inventory of locative cases. Like other Uralic languages, Komi has no gender. Verbs agree with subjects in person and number (sg/pl). Negation is expressed with an auxiliary verb, which is inflected for person, number and tense.

Komi is an agglutinative language and adheres to a subject–object–verb order. Most modern texts, however, possess a subject-verb-object word order, due to heavy Russian language influence and the resulting calques.

== Sample text ==
The following sample text displays the Anbur, Cyrillic (modern) and Latin lyrical text from the Komi-Zyryan folk song "Катшасинъяс" (Kačaśinjas, meaning Daisies).

The first verse of the song and the refrain, as written in the Anbur Script:

𐍚𐍩𐍠𐍚𐍩 𐍣𐍗𐍛𐍐𐍝𐍝𐍯𐍓 𐍩𐍝, 𐍚𐍐𐍤𐍐𐍥𐍙𐍝𐍙𐍐𐍡, 𐍜𐍯𐍙𐍛𐍐 𐍮𐍩𐍥𐍡𐍐𐍩𐍥 𐍟𐍯𐍠 𐍢𐍙𐍙𐍐𐍝 𐍥𐍙𐍝𐍙𐍐𐍡; 𐍜𐍔𐍝𐍩 𐍟𐍯𐍠 𐍡𐍩𐍜𐍯𐍝 𐍢𐍙 𐍓𐍙𐍝𐍩 𐍝𐍣𐍩 𐍛𐍯𐍓𐍢𐍩𐍜 𐍘𐍩𐍠𐍙𐍘𐍩𐍝 𐍢𐍯𐍠 𐍚𐍩𐍜𐍙 𐍜𐍣𐍩 𐍚𐍐𐍤𐍐𐍥𐍙𐍝𐍙𐍐𐍡, 𐍚𐍐𐍤𐍐𐍥𐍙𐍝𐍙𐍐𐍡, 𐍜𐍯𐍙𐍛𐍐 𐍮𐍩𐍥𐍡𐍐𐍩𐍥 𐍟𐍯𐍠 𐍢𐍙𐍙𐍐𐍝 𐍥𐍙𐍝𐍙𐍐𐍡;

The second verse and refrain, as written in the Zyryan Cyrillic Alphabet:

Эмöсь лунвылын мичаджык муяс, Сэнi кывтöны визувджык юяс. Сöмын мыйлакö пыр медся матыс Эзысь лысваöн дзирдалысь асыв. Катшасинъяс, Катшасинъяс, Мыйла восьсаöсь пыр тiян синъяс?

The third and final verse and refrain, as written in the modern Latin alphabet:

Una śylankyv tatyś mi kyvlim, Kodös śiöny raďejtan nyvly. Lovja dźoridźyś myj burys śurö Syly puktyny kudria jurö. Kačaśinjas, Kačaśinjas, Myjla vośsaöś pyr tijan śinjas?

== Bibliography ==
- Bartens, Raija (2000). Permiläisten kielten rakenne ja kehitys (in Finnish). Helsinki: Suomalais-Ugrilainen Seura. ISBN 952-5150-55-0.
- R. M. Batalova. 1993. Komi(-Zyryanskij) Jazyk. In V. N. Jartseva (ed.), Jazyki Mira: Ural'skie Jazyki, 214–229. Moskva: Nauka.
- Feďuňova, G.V. Önija komi kyv ('The Modern Komi Language'). Morfologija/Daśtöma filologijasa kandidat G.V.Feďuňova kipod ulyn. Syktyvkar: Komi ňebög ledźanin, 2000. 544 pp. ISBN 5-7555-0689-2.
- Riese, Timothy (8 April 2015). Abondolo, Daniel (ed.). The Uralic Languages. Routledge. pp. 249–275. ISBN 978-1-136-13500-2.
