= Je (Cyrillic) =

Cyrillic letter

- Ј ј

Usage
- Writing system: Cyrillic
- Type: Alphabetic
- Sound values: [j]; [ȷ̊]; [ɟ]; [dz]; [dʒ]

History
Development
D36
          - Ιι
            - 𐌉
              - I i
                - J j
                  - Ј ј
- Transliterations: J j

Je (Ј ј; italics: Ј ј) is a letter of the Cyrillic script, taken over from the Latin letter J.

It commonly represents the palatal approximant /j/, like the pronunciation of ⟨j⟩ in "hallelujah".

== History ==
The Cyrillic letter ј was introduced in the 1818 Serbian dictionary of Vuk Stefanović Karadžić, on the basis of the Latin letter J. Karadžić had previously used ї instead for the same sound, a usage he took from Dositej Obradović, and the final choice also notably edged out another expected candidate, й, used in every other standard Slavic-language Cyrillic script.

== Usage ==
An asterisk (*) means the language does not use the letter in its writing anymore.

Language	pronunciation	notes
Altai	voiced palatal plosive /ɟ~dʒ/	
Azerbaijani	/j/	corresponds to ⟨y⟩ in the official Latin alphabet.
Kildin Sami	voiceless palatal approximant /j̊/	the letter Short I with tail (Ҋ ҋ) is also used.
Macedonian	/j/	Prior to the development of the Macedonian alphabet in 1944–45, Macedonian authors used either І і or Й й.
Orok	/j/	
Ossetian*	/j/	used in the original (pre-1923) Cyrillic orthography.
Serbo-Croatian (Cyrillic)	/j/	in Vuk Karadžić's alphabet, the letter Je replaced the traditional letter Short I (Й й), which invited accusations of submission to the Latin script and Catholic Church (in Austria) from the Orthodox clergy.
Suret*	/j/	Used in the Cyrillic script created during the USSR's Cyrillization program of the 1930s to 1950s.

== Related letters and other similar characters ==
- Е е : Cyrillic letter Ye
- Й й : Cyrillic letter Short I
- І і : Cyrillic letter Dotted I
- Ҋ ҋ : Cyrillic letter Short I with tail
- , : Cyrillic letter Je with belt
- J j : Latin letter J
- Y y : Latin letter Y

== Computing codes ==
Character information
Preview	Ј		ј	
Unicode name	CYRILLIC CAPITAL LETTER JE		CYRILLIC SMALL LETTER JE	
Encodings	decimal	hex	dec	hex
Unicode	1032	U+0408	1112	U+0458
UTF-8	208 136	D0 88	209 152	D1 98
Numeric character reference	&#1032;	&#x408;	&#1112;	&#x458;
Named character reference	&Jsercy;		&jsercy;	
Code page 855	143	8F	142	8E
Windows-1251	163	A3	188	BC
ISO-8859-5	168	A8	248	F8
Macintosh Cyrillic	183	B7	192	C0
