= Cyrillisation in the Soviet Union =

Move from Latin scripts to Cyrillic

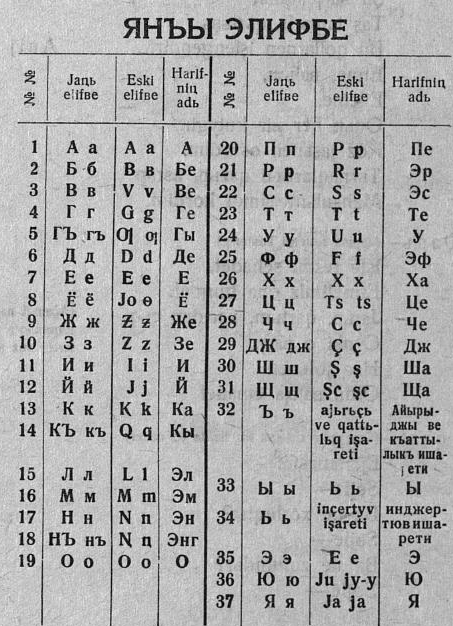
Correspondence table of Crimean Tatar alphabets in Latin (Yanalif) and Cyrillic during transtition to Cyrillic, 1938

In the USSR, cyrillisation or cyrillization (Russian: Кириллиза́ция, romanized: kirillizatsiya) was a campaign from the late 1930s to the 1950s to replace official writing systems based on Latin script (such as Yanalif or the Unified Northern Alphabet), which had been introduced during the previous latinization program, with new alphabets based on Cyrillic.

== History ==
=== Background ===
The cyrillization program cannot be separated from the changing views of the Soviet Union's leadership under Joseph Stalin in the mid-1930s. When the leader began to rule in absolute terms, he was worried about the appearance of parties that could become his enemies, especially from outside, such as Turkey (which borders the Azerbaijan SSR). The country had "brothers" in the form of Turkic nations in the Soviet Union (such as Turkmens and Azeris). Not to mention that a number of anti-Soviet emigrants who settled there, for example the Musavat Party from Azerbaijan, had been writing in Turkish (which had Latin letters since 1928) which the Soviets felt was not much different from the Azeri language in the Soviet Union (which had also been using the Latin alphabet since the early 1920s).

In the same period, the practice of korenizatsiya (indigenization) was officially discontinued; instead, the Soviet government began to emphasize the cultural and linguistic advantages of Russian as a "progressive language" and the "official language of the revolution", whereas all socialist countries needed to use only Russian because it was a "complete language". In the ideological discourse of the Communist Party it was stated that because various languages and cultures were currently developing well and peacefully, it was time for these cultures to unite into one nation, namely the Soviet nation which used one language, Russian (Japhetic theory). With this, it was hoped that Soviet people could become Homo Sovieticus who was loyal to the leadership of the Communist Party. On the contrary, indigenous culture was now seen as "bourgeois nationalism" which was inconsistent with the spirit of "proletarian internationalism". Also, the Latin alphabet previously used in many languages was now considered a "bourgeois script" that supported oppression, so that people who used it were "difficult to develop together".

In fact, the concerns of Soviet policymakers about the "separation" of peoples who used languages written in the Latin script from those who used Cyrillic had been a debate since the 1920s. For example, in 1929, Semyon Dimanstein, a Soviet official in the nationalities policy, criticized the Latinization policy as a means of "separating the Turkic peoples from Russia".

Related to this was the use of two languages (namely Russian and other languages) which used different ways of writing. It was felt that the use of Latin scripts, which had been encouraged since the 1920s, prevented non-Russian peoples from learning the Russian language. As according to a statement submitted by one of the following sections of the CPSU:

[Students]... now have to get acquainted with two completely different writing systems at the same time in a relatively short period, often confusing the letters of one script with the letters of another (script).

With the transition to Cyrillic, it was hoped that non-Russian people could learn Russian more easily. Soviet Turcologists, such as Nikolai Baskakov, stated that learning Cyrillic script was a great tool to speed up the assimilation of non-Russians into Russian culture. Another argument also stated that the transition to Cyrillic was not a "submission" of non-Russian culture into Russian culture, but rather "the most rational way" to develop the culture of a region, and a form of friendship with Russian people, as well as a sign of internationalist unity for the entire Soviet population.

Another factor was the existence of a number of languages that had previously used Cyrillic scripts, such as Chuvash, Mari and Mordovian, for which the transition to the Latin script was actually ineffective due to the large amount of literature previously written in Cyrillic. Economic factors also had an effect, where printing using two scripts (Cyrillic and Latin) was considered inefficient.

Although many consider the transition from Latin to Cyrillic to be more due to political factors, in the campaign towards cyrillization, Soviet sources argued that linguistic factors were also important in supporting the process. For example, there was an argument that said that the Cyrillic script was better at describing every sound than the Latin script; some said that the Cyrillic script was easier to learn; and another argument stated that the Latin script was not suitable for the languages to be cyrillicized.

=== Process ===
Cyrillization of many languages began in 1936–1937, and continued until the 1950s. In general, this process was preceded by campaigns and propaganda in Soviet media. For example, it was claimed that in nations that had been writing their language using the Latin script, there was an "enthusiasm" to change their writing system into Cyrillic. Various statements were issued to destroy the image of Latin script; for example, in the Azerbaijan SSR, it was said that people who wrote in the Latin script or its promoters were carriers of the spirit of Pan-Turkism, or enemies of the people, while in Turkmen SSR and the Moldavian ASSR, those who rejected the change to the Cyrillic script were claimed to be "enemies of the people, bourgeois-nationalists, and pro-Trotskyist-Bukharinist agents".

The situation was facilitated by the Great Purge, which helped those who supported the cyrillization project to eliminate those who had been considered pro-latinization. The tight control of the Stalinist regime in the late 1930s meant that discussion of the transition was almost non-existent. However, in every official decision regarding the transition from Latin to Cyrillic, the Soviet government often claimed there was a "direct request of the Soviet people" in the process – for example, during the transition in the Tatar language, the Soviets claimed it was supported by "workers, intelligentsia and Tatar kolkhozniks", and in the Turkmen language, the process began with a letter of support from group of teachers in the city of Baýramaly.

The first language whose writing was changed from Latin to Cyrillic was Kabardian in 1935–1936, which was followed by languages in the North in 1936. Later, the cyrillicization project was applied to almost all languages whose writing had previously been latinized, for example Kazakh, Bashkir, and Tatar; by 1941, 60 of the Soviet Union's 67 written languages had been cyrillicized. The project continued into the 1950s, with a number of new languages being cyrillicized, such as Kurdish (1946) and Dungan (1953). The process of cyrillicization also affected Soviet satellite states in the early 1940s, such as Mongolia and Tuva, in their respective official languages (Mongolian and Tuvan). However, there were a number of languages that did not implement it, such as Estonian, Latvian, Lithuanian, Finnish, Georgian, Karelian, Armenian, and Yiddish.

The Abkhaz and Ossetian languages were a special case: these two languages were not cyrillized, but were initially converted to Georgian scripts; only in the 1950s did Abkhaz and Ossetian begin to use Cyrillic. Some languages which still did not have written forms during the peak of the latinization campaign, such as Gagauz, were later also given Cyrillic-based alphabets.

In general, the process of converting to Cyrillic script in many languages tended to be hasty. For example, in Kyrgyz, Bashkir, and Uzbek, just a short time after the new orthography of these languages was officially adopted, local parliaments passed decrees changing the writing system from Latin to Cyrillic. This led to many new Cyrillic-based alphabets being implemented with little regard for the specific features of each language. According to Turcologist Baskakov, the Latin scripts previously used actually corresponded more to the phonetic aspects of the Turkic languages than Cyrillic. Development of the linguistic aspects of the newly cyrillicized languages was then complicated by events such as World War II and the effects of the Great Purge which eliminated the existing local elites. For example, the publication of the Tatar-Russian dictionary using the Cyrillic alphabet was only possible after de-Stalinization in the mid-1950s.

== Features ==
Initially, in almost all projects of new Cyrillic alphabets, it was decided to use only the 33 letters of the Russian alphabet, with the addition of apostrophes, digraphs, trigraphs and tetragraphs for non-Russian languages. However, such an arrangement turned out to be very inconvenient and did not reflect the phonetic richness of many languages. As a result, additional letters were introduced in a number of alphabets (Tatar, Kazakh, Yakut, etc.). In the 1940s-1950s, in some languages (e.g. Altaic), digraphs were also replaced with additional letters.

While Soviet propaganda claimed that the switch to Cyrillic was better for the affected languages, in many cases the new Cyrillic alphabets were not well adapted to the languages. For example, in the Evenk language there are phonemes that do not exist in Russian, but the letters were still written using the existing Russian scripts, without creating new letters. It is also noted that in a number of languages there were orthographic changes that were subsequently made or proposed, such as in Tatar.

== Effects ==
As previously mentioned, cyrillization cannot be separated from the Russification process. In general, this process is accompanied by efforts to absorb words from the Russian language on a large scale into non-Russian languages.

Examples are in many Turkic languages. By one estimate, initially only about 25-40 words from Russian were absorbed, but by the late 1960s, there were thousands of Russian words absorbed, many of them words in common use. In contrast, korenizatsiya was characterized by efforts to purify local languages from foreign influences (in Turkic languages, by changing Arabic and Persian loanwords). During this period there were also attempts to replace words borrowed from Persian and Arabic with words borrowed from Russian; for example şura was replaced by sovet and cumhuriyet by respublika. Furthermore, the spelling of these new words was in accordance with the Russian language; for example, the Russian word совет, which is pronounced [sɐˈvʲet] with a palatalized V, was spelled sovet in Azeri based on the Russian spelling, while in Turkish, which was unaffected by Soviet cyrillization rules, the spelling sovyet, which reflects the palatalized V of the original, was adopted. The usage of nativized spelling in Yakut is contentious.

Russification also led to diminished use of and teaching in local languages, with Russian being the main language spoken in many areas of life, while the local language was spoken only in the village or at home. Some non-Russian children grew up only being able to speak Russian. The process also resulted in many ethnic groups not being able to read their historical records of the previous decade, which were already written in the Roman alphabet.

The cyrillicization process was also characterized by "artificial" efforts to separate and differentiate languages; for example, in the Moldovan ASSR, Soviet language planners replaced the Romanian Latin alphabet with a new Cyrillic alphabet derived from Russian, and exaggerated Moldovan regionalisms in vocabulary, to create the impression of a Moldovan language distinct from Romanian. Pseudo-historical arguments were also included in the discussion of the history of the Turkic languages, such as the argument that these languages were very different from those spoken outside the Soviet Union, or that the Azeri language was related to the North Caucasian languages in Dagestan. The result was that many Turkic peoples appeared increasingly distinct from their ethnic relatives, such as (Soviet) Azeris from Iranian Azeris and Turkish Turks.

Cyrillicization also drove a wedge in the unity of Turkic languages: while Turkic latinization was coordinated, cyrillization was conducted separately and resulted in disparate alphabets and spellings. Texts were more inaccessible to other nationalities, and current speakers still do not engage with other nationalities' literature while already communicating orally.

After the collapse of the Soviet Union, several post-Soviet countries began to introduce new Latin alphabets for their national languages (e.g. Turkmen, Uzbek, and Azeri). One of the reasons for re-adopting the Latin alphabet was to reverse the process of Russification associated with the Soviet cyrillization attempts. Tatarstan also attempted to implement a new Latin alphabet but was blocked by a reactive Russian Federation law in 2002.

== See also ==
- Cyrillization of Chinese
