= Latinisation in the Soviet Union =

1920s–1930s script reform campaign

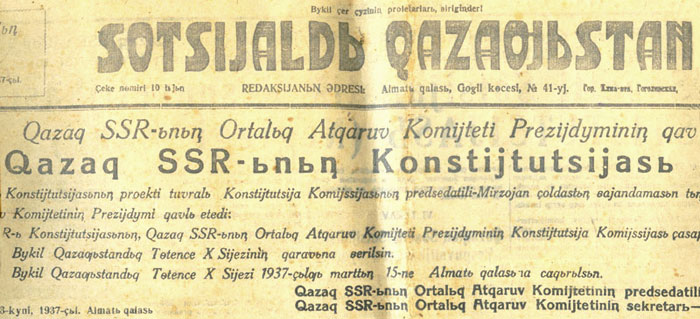
A Kazakh-language newspaper written in the Latin script from 1937. Published in Almaty.

Latinisation or latinization (Russian: латиниза́ция, romanized: latinizatsiya [ɫətʲɪnʲɪˈzat͡sɨjə]) was a campaign in the Soviet Union to adopt the Latin script during the 1920s and 1930s. Latinisation aimed to replace Cyrillic and traditional writing systems for all languages of the Soviet Union with Latin or Latin-based systems, or introduce them for languages that did not have a writing system. Latinisation began to slow in the Soviet Union during the 1930s and a Cyrillisation campaign was launched instead. Latinization had effectively ended by the 1940s. Most of these Latin alphabets are defunct and several (especially for languages in the Caucasus) contain multiple letters that do not have Unicode support as of 2023.

== History ==
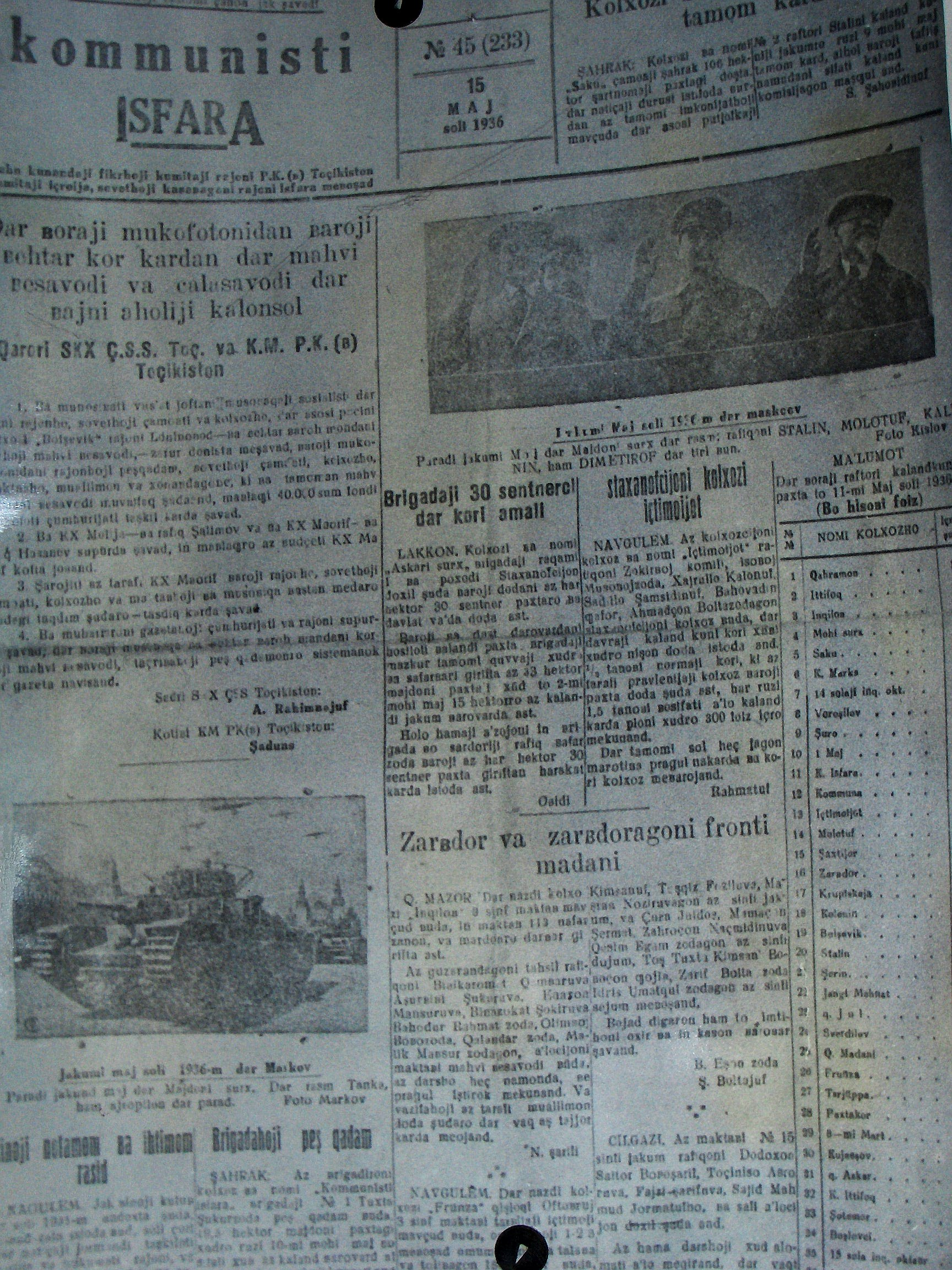
A Tajik newspaper in Latin script from 1936. Published in Tajik SSR, USSR

=== Background ===
Since at least 1700, some intellectuals in the Russian Empire had sought to Latinise the Russian language, written in Cyrillic script, in their desire for closer relations with the West.

In the early 20th century, the Bolsheviks had four goals: to break with Tsarism, to spread socialism to the whole world, to isolate the Muslim inhabitants of the Soviet Union from the Arabic–Islamic world and religion, and to eradicate illiteracy through simplification. They concluded the Latin alphabet was the right tool to do so and, after seizing power during the Russian Revolution of 1917, they made plans to realise these ideals.

Although progress was slow at first, in 1926, the Turkic-majority republics of the Soviet Union adopted the Latin script, giving a major boost to reformers in neighbouring Turkey. In 1928, when Turkish president Mustafa Kemal Atatürk adopted the new Turkish Latin alphabet to break with Arabic script, this in turn encouraged the Soviet leaders to proceed. By 1933, it was estimated that among some language groups that had shifted from an Arabic-based script to Latin, literacy rates rose from 2% to 60%.

=== Procedure ===
After the Russian Revolution, as the Soviets looked to build a state that better accommodated the diverse national groups that had made up the Russian Empire, support for literacy and national languages became a major political project. Soviet nationalities policy called for conducting education and government work in national languages, which spurred the need for linguistic reform. Among the Islamic and Turkic peoples of Central Asia, the most common literary script for their languages was based on Arabic or Persian script; however, these were considered a hindrance to literacy, particularly for Turkic languages because of its lack of scripted vowels.

In the 1920s, efforts were made to modify the Arabic (such as the Yaña imlâ alphabet developed for Tatar), but some groups adopted Latin-based alphabets instead. Because of past conflict with tsarist missionaries, a Latin-based script was viewed as "less odious" than a Cyrillic one. By the end of the decade, the move towards latinisation was in full swing. On 8 August 1929, the Central Executive Committee and the Council of People's Commissars of the USSR issued the decree "On the New Latinised Alphabet of the Peoples of the Arabic Written Language of the USSR", and thus the transition to the Latin alphabet was given an official status for all Turko-Tatar languages in the Soviet Union.

Efforts then began in earnest to expand beyond replacing Arabic script and Turkic languages and to develop Latin-based scripts for all national languages in the Soviet Union. In 1929, the People's Commissariat of the RSFSR formed a committee to develop the question of the latinisation of the Russian alphabet, the All-Union Committee for the New Alphabet (Russian: ВЦК НА, VTsK NA), led by Professor N. F. Yakovlev and with the participation of linguists, bibliographers, printers, and engineers. By 1932, Latin-based scripts were developed for almost all Turkic, Iranian, Mongolic, Tungusic, and Uralic languages, totalling 66 of the 72 written languages in the USSR. There also existed plans to latinise Chinese, Korean, and Russian, along with other Slavic languages.

=== Decline ===
By mid-January 1930, the VTsK NA had officially completed its work. However, on 25 January 1930, General Secretary Joseph Stalin ordered to halt the development of the question of the latinisation of the Cyrillic alphabet for Russian. Belarusian and Ukrainian were similarly placed off limits for latinisation. Stalin's order led to a gradual slowdown of the campaign. By 1933, attitudes towards latinisation had shifted dramatically and all the newly romanised languages were converted to Cyrillic. The only language without an attempt to latinise its script was Georgian.

In total, between 1923 and 1939, Latin alphabets were implemented for 50 out of 72 languages of the USSR that were written, and Latin alphabets were developed for a number of previously exclusively oral languages. In the Mari, Mordvinic and Udmurt languages, the use of the Cyrillic alphabet continued even during the period of maximum latinisation due in part to a growing body of literature written with the Cyrillic alphabet in those languages.

In 1936, a new Cyrillisation campaign began to move all the languages of the peoples of the USSR to Cyrillic, which was largely completed by 1940. German, Georgian, Armenian and Yiddish remained non-cyrillised from the languages common in the USSR, with the last three never being latinised either. Later, Polish, Finnish, Latvian, Estonian and Lithuanian languages also remained un-cyrillised.

== List of languages ==
The following languages were latinised or adapted new Latin-based alphabets during the 1920s and 1930s:

1. Abaza (1932)
2. Abkhaz (Abkhaz alphabet) (1924)
3. Adyghe (1926)
4. Altai (1929)
5. Assyrian (1930)
6. Avar (1928)
7. Azerbaijani (Azerbaijani alphabet) (1922)
8. Balochi (Balochi Latin) (1933)
9. Bashkir (1927)
10. Bukhori (1929)
11. Buryat (1929)
12. Chechen (1925)
13. Chinese (Latinxua Sin Wenz) (1931)
14. Chukchi (Chucki Latin) (1931)
15. Crimean Tatar (First Latin) (1927)
16. Dargin (1928)
17. Dungan (1928)
18. Eskimo (1931)
19. Even (1931)
20. Evenki (Evenki Latin) (1931)
21. Ingrian (Ingrian alphabet) (1932)
22. Ingush (1923)
23. Itelmen (1931)
24. Juhuri (1929)
25. Kabardiano-Cherkess (1923)
26. Kalmyk (1930)
27. Karachay-Balkar (1924)
28. Karaim (1928)
29. Karakalpak (1928)
30. Karelian (Karelian alphabet) (1931)
31. Kazakh (Kazakh alphabet) (1928)
32. Ket (1931)
33. Khakas (1929)
34. Khanty (1931)
35. Komi (1932)
36. Komi-Permyak (1932)
37. Koryak (1931)
38. Krymchak (1928)
39. Kumandin (1932)
40. Kumyk (1927)
41. Kurdish (Kurdish alphabets) (1929)
42. Kyrgyz (Kyrgyz alphabets) (1928)
43. Lak (1928)
44. Laz (1930)
45. Lezgin (Lezgin alphabets) (1928)
46. Mansi (1931)
47. Moldovan (name given in the USSR to Romanian) (1928)
48. Nanai language (1931)
49. Nenets languages (1931)
50. Nivkh language (1931)
51. Nogai language (1928)
52. Ossetic language (1923)
53. Persian language (Persian alphabet) (1930)
54. Sámi language (Kildin & Ter) (1931)
55. Selkup language (1931)
56. Shor language (1931)
57. Shughni language (1932)
58. Yakut language (1920/1929)
59. Tabasaran language (1932)
60. Tajik alphabet (1928)
61. Talysh language (1929)
62. Tat language (1933)
63. Tatar language (Yañalif) (1928)
64. Tsakhur language (1934)
65. Turkmen alphabet (1929)
66. Udege language (1931)
67. Udi language (1934)
68. Uyghur language (1928)
69. Uzbek language (1927)
70. Vepsian language (1932)

Projects were created and approved for the following languages, but were not implemented:

1. Aleut language
2. Arabic language
3. Korean language
4. Udmurt language

== See also ==
- Cyrillisation in the Soviet Union
- Korenizatsiya
- Yañalif
- Uniform Turkic Alphabet
- Unified Northern Alphabet
- Cyrillization of Chinese
- Belarusian Latin alphabet
- Russian Latin alphabet
- Ukrainian Latin alphabet
- Mongolian Latin alphabet
- Spread of the Latin script

== Bibliography ==
- Eva Toulouze (2016). Vasili Lytkin and the latinisation of Komi. p. 12.
