= Turkmen alphabet =

Scripts used to write the Turkmen language

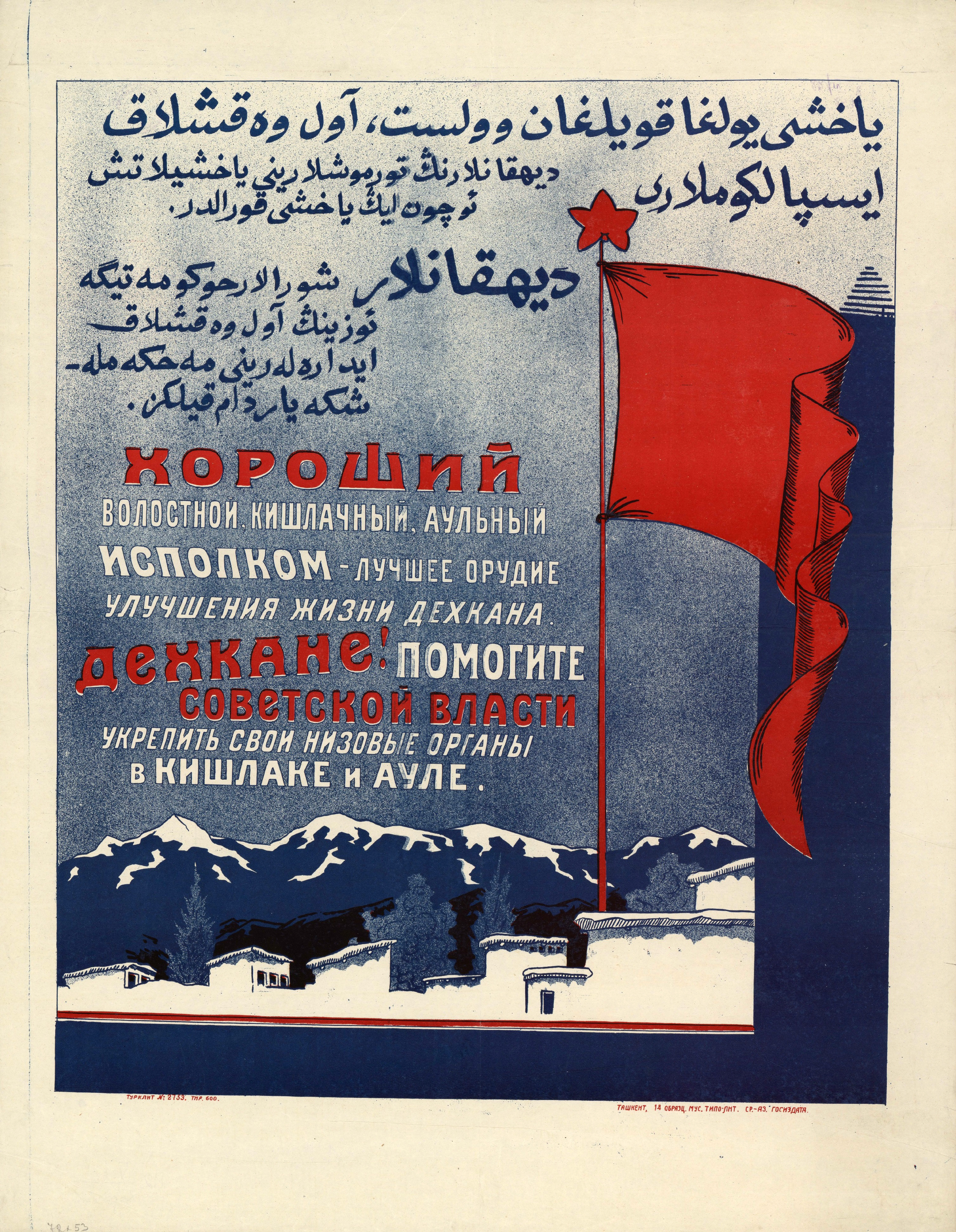
1924 poster in Uzbek (top, Arabic-based script), Turkmen (middle, Arabic-based script) and Russian (bottom)

The Turkmen alphabet (Note: Turkmen: Türkmen elipbiýi / Tүркмен элипбийи / تۆرکمن الیپبی‌یی / [t̪ʏɾkˈmøn ˌelɪp̚bɪˈjɪ]) refers to variants of the Latin alphabet, Cyrillic alphabet, or Arabic alphabet used for writing of the Turkmen language.

The modified variant of the Latin alphabet currently has an official status in Turkmenistan.

For centuries, literary Turkic tradition in Central Asia (Chagatai) revolved around the Arabic alphabet. At the start of the 20th century, when local literary conventions were to match colloquial variants of Turkic languages, and Turkmen-proper started to be written, it continued to use the Arabic script. In the 1920s, in Soviet Turkmenistan, issues and shortcomings of the Arabic alphabet for accurately representing Turkmen were identified and the orthography was refined (same as other Arabic-derived orthographies in Central Asia, such as Uzbek and Kazakh alphabets). But by 1928, due to state-policy, this orthography was discarded and the Latin script was adopted. In 1940, the Russian influence in Soviet Turkmenistan prompted a switch to a Cyrillic alphabet and a Turkmen Cyrillic alphabet (shown below in the table alongside the Latin) was created. When Turkmenistan became independent in 1991, President Saparmurat Niyazov immediately instigated a return to the Latin script. When it was reintroduced in 1993, it was supposed to use some unusual letters, such as the pound (£), dollar ($), yen (¥) and cent signs (¢), but these were replaced by more conventional letter symbols in 1999.

Turkmen is still often written with a modified variant of the Arabic alphabet in other countries where the language is spoken and where the Arabic script is dominant (such as Iran and Afghanistan).

== Evolution ==
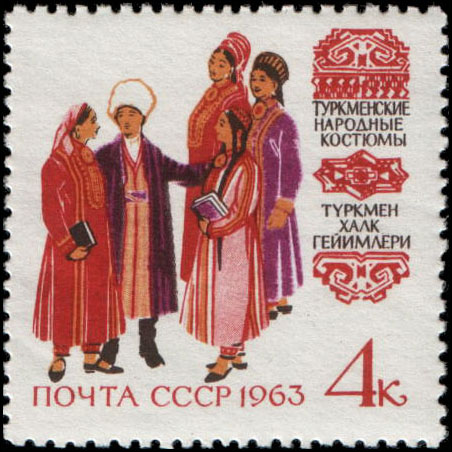
Soviet stamp showing Turkmen costume (1963); the middle text is Turkmen Cyrillic, Türkmen halk geýimleri in Latin orthography

Latin					Cyrillic, 1940–1993	Arabic		IPA
Current, since 1999	1993–1999	1992 (project)	Jaꞑalif 1929–1940	Common Turkic alphabet	Cyrillic, 1940–1993	Turkmen SSR (1923–1929)	Iran and Afghanistan	IPA
A a	A a				А а	آ / ـا	آ / ـا	/ɑ/, /ɑː/
B b	B b		B ʙ	B b	Б б	ب		/b/
Ç ç	Ç ç	C c		Ç ç	Ч ч	چ		/tʃ/
D d	D d				Д д	د		/d/
E e	E e				initial Э э non-init. Е е	اە / ە / ـە	Initial: اِ or ا End of syl.: ه Else: ـِ / ـ	/e/
Ä ä	Ä ä	Ea ea	Ə ə	Ä ä	Ә ә	ٴا / ٴـا	أ / ـأ	/æː/
F f	F f				Ф ф	ف		/f/
G g	G g		G g		Г г	گ	Front: ق Back: گ	/ɡ/
G g	G g		Ƣ ƣ	Ğ ğ	Г г	غ		/ɣ~ʁ/
H h	H h		H h		Х х	ھ / ح	Native: ە Loanwords: ح	/h/
H h	H h		X x		Х х	خ		/χ/
I i	I i			İ i	И и	ٴاېـ / ٴېـ / ٴې	ایـ / یـ / ی	/ɪ~i/, /ɪː~iː/
J j	J j		Ç ç	C c	Җ җ	ج		/dʒ/
Ž ž	£ ɿ (Note: The lowercase in this table is an approximation using CSS. In plain text, it can be approximated with ſ, a glyph for long s; although the actual letter starts at the median and descends below the baseline.)	Jh jh	Ƶ ƶ	J j	Ж ж	ژ		/ʒ/
K k	K k		K k		К к	ك	ک	/k/
K k	K k		Q q		К к	ق		/q/
L l	L l		L ʟ	L l	Л л	ل		/l/
M m	M m				М м	م		/m/
N n	N n				Н н	ن		/n/
Ň ň	Ñ ñ	Ng ng	Ꞑ ꞑ	Ñ ñ	Ң ң	ڭ	نگ	/ŋ/
O o	O o				О о	او / و	اوْ / وْ	/o/, /oː/
Ö ö	Ö ö	Q q	Ɵ ɵ	Ö ö	Ө ө	ٴاو / ٴو	اؤ / ؤ	/œ/, /œː/
P p	P p				П п	پ		/p/
R r	R r				Р р	ر		/r/
S s	S s				С с	Native: س Loanwords: ث / ص		/θ/
Ş ş	$ ¢	Sh sh	Ş ş		Ш ш	ش		/ʃ/
T t	T t				Т т	ت	Native: ت Loanwords: ط	/t/
U u	U u				У у	اۇ / ۇ	اۇ / ۇ	/u/, /uː/
Ü ü	Ü ü	V v	Y y	Ü ü	Ү ү	ٴاۇ / ٴۇ	اۆ / ۆ	/y/
W w	W w		V v		В в	ۋ	و	/w~β/
Y y	Y y	X x	Ь ь	I ı	Ы ы	اېـ / ېـ / ې	اؽـ / ؽـ / ؽ	/ɯ~ɨ/, /ɯː~ɨː/
Ý ý	¥ ÿ	Y y	J j	Y y	Й й	یـ / ی		/j/
Z z	Z z				З з	ز	Native: ز Loanwords: ذ / ض / ظ	/ð/

In the historic Turkmen SSR Arabic orthography (1923–1929), a small uppercase Hamza was used for indicating front vowels when vowel sounds can't be perceived from other vowels or consonants in a word, very similar to the use of Hamza in Kazakh Arabic alphabet. In Turkmen, there are 9 vowels, 8 of which formed 4 pairs in the Turkmen SSR Arabic orthography. Below are these pairs, the back vowel and its corresponding front vowel:

- A a / Ä ä (both written with alef, ـا)
- O o / Ö ö (both written with vav, او / و)
- U u / Ü ü (both written with vav+damma, اۇ / ۇ)
- Y y / I i (both written with ya majhul, اېـ / ېـ / ې)
- E e (Written with he in final position, اە / ـە / ە)

If a word contains front vowels, a small uppercase Hamza was used; except if the word also contained either the vowel E e (Written with he in final position, اە / ـە / ە), or the consonants for [k] or [g] (Written with kaf and gaf, كـ / ـكـ / ـك; گـ / ـگـ / ـگ). As per Turkmen vowel harmony rules, these three letters are only accompanied with front vowels, thus the small uppercase Hamza will be redundant and is not written.

== Arabic script ==
In Turkmenistan, Turkmen was primarily written in the Arabic script prior to latinisation in the Soviet Union. There were earlier attempts at standardisation of the Turkmen Arabic script, with rules and vowel conventions similar to those used by other Turkic languages of Russian Turkistan, such as Kazakh, Karakalpak, Kyrgyz, and Uzbek; however, all Arabic-based orthographies were eventually banned by Soviet authorities in 1929.

In Iran and Afghanistan, the Turkmen Arabic script remains in use. In Iran, specifically, the development of a modern standardized Perso-Arabic alphabet for Turkmen has been ongoing for the past four decades. It is based on the original Persian alphabet with slight modifications. It was first developed by Dr. Hamid Notqi and published in the Iranian-Azerbaijani Varlyq magazine. Since then, this system has been adopted by Iranian-Turkmens, and has been used for the publication of Turkmen-language publications such as Yaprak and Sahra, as well as by the Turkish State Media TRT. In 2010, the Iranian-Turkmen literaturist and linguist Mahmyt Atagazly compiled the alphabet in a booklet called "Guideline for Writing Turkmen Correctly" (Persian: راهنمای نوشتار درست ترکمنی; Turkmen: تۆرکمن یازۇو قادالاری, romanized: Türkmen Ýazuw Kadalary). In this booklet, not only has Atagazly presented the alphabet, he has also reviewed the phonology of the Turkmen language and the rules of writing Turkmen to reflect this phonology accurately.

=== Vowels ===
In the Turkmen Arabic alphabet, 9 vowels are defined.

		Rounded		Unrounded		
		Close	Open	Close		Open
Back یوْغیٛن چِکیمی سِس‌لِر ýogyn çekimli sesler	Arabic	اوُ / وُ	اوْ / وْ	ایٛ / یٛ		آ / ‍ـا
Back یوْغیٛن چِکیمی سِس‌لِر ýogyn çekimli sesler	Latin	U u	O o	Y y		A a
Back یوْغیٛن چِکیمی سِس‌لِر ýogyn çekimli sesler	IPA	[u]	[o]	[ɯ]		[ɑ]
Front اینچه چِکیمی سِس‌لِر inçe çekimli sesler	Arabic	اۆ / ۆ	اؤ / ؤ	ای / ی	اِ / ـِ / ه	أ / ـأ
Front اینچه چِکیمی سِس‌لِر inçe çekimli sesler	Latin	Ü ü	Ö ö	I i	E e	Ä ä
Front اینچه چِکیمی سِس‌لِر inçe çekimli sesler	IPA	[y]	[ø]	[i]	[ɛ]	[æ]

==== Vowel Harmony ====
Like other Turkic languages, Turkmen has a system of vowel harmony. Turkmen's system of vowel harmony is primarily a front/back system. This means that all vowels in a word must be ones that are pronounced either at the front or at the back of the mouth. In Turkmen there are two suffixes that make a plural: ـلِر ler after front vowels, and ـلار lar after back vowels. The same variety of options for suffixes exist across the board in Turkmen. Here is how vowel harmony works, in an example of a word in which the vowels are all frontal:

- The word for dog is ایت it, and the pluralized form is ایتلِر itler (not ایتلار itlar).
- The word for four is دؤرت dört, and the word for all four of us is دؤردیمیز dördimiz.

And below are examples for back vowels:

- The word for mountain is داغ dag; thus, the word for mountains is داغلار daglar (not داغلر dagler).

Another sort of vowel harmony that exists in Turkmen is the system in which each syllable is required to have one, and only one vowel. This rule even applies to loanwords, who have their pronunciation altered in order to match this rule.

==== Vowel rounding ====
In Turkmen there is a rule whereby words do not end in rounded vowels (unlike in Azerbaijani, Turkish, or Kyrgyz).

The round vowels اوْ o and اؤ ö can only exist in the first syllable. Even if they are heard in pronunciation in other syllables, they are written as ـا a and ــِـ ە e, respectively. Likewise, the round vowels اوُ u and اۆ ü can only exist in the first and second syllables.

Compound words, as well as loanwords, are exceptions to these rules.

==== Vowel orthography ====
Of the two forms of the vowels above, some of them happen to have the letter ا (alif) in one of their forms, but not the other. These vowels, if at the beginning of the word, will universally be accompanied with the alif, but if they happen to follow a consonant, then the alif will be dropped. E.g., the vowel corresponding to the Latin letter u is written as اوُ in initial positions. The examples below for words including this vowel are as follows:

- The word for flour is اوُن un (and not وُن).
- The word for wheat is بوُغدای bugdaý (and not باوُغدای).

In Turkmen there are two types of syllables: open-ended syllables (ending in a vowel) and close-ended syllables. Open-ended syllables are ones that end in a vowel, i.e. they are in a V or cV form. Close-ended syllables are those that end in a consonant, i.e. they are in a Vc or cVc form. This generally does not matter, with the exception of the vowel that represents the same sound as the Latin letter e. If the syllable is close-ended, the diacritic form of the vowel ــِـ is used. But if the syllable is open-ended, the ە form is used (similar to how this letter is used as a vowel in Kurdish and Uyghur). Below are examples for the two:

- The word dessan ('story') is broken down to two close-ended syllables, des-san. Thus, the diacritic form of the vowel e is used, and the word is written in the Turkmen Arabic alphabet as دِسسان [d̪eθ.θɑ́n]. Similar to Persian and Arabic orthographies, diacritics are standardly omitted from writing.
- The word erteki is broken down to three syllables: er-te-ki, with two open-ended syllables. The e vowel in the second syllable is written as ە, and thus, the word is spelt ارتەکی [eɾ.t̪e.kɪ́] (not ارتِکی).

There is one exception to this rule, and that is the suffix -leri, which indicates that a noun is plural and in an objective or possessive case. Despite the suffix consisting of an open-ended syllable [-le-], it is written as ـلری (and not ـلەری).

The Latin letter a is generally written as آ / ـا. This is universally true for words of Turkmen origin. However, in Persian or Arabic loanwords, which have been incorporated in the Turkmen language for centuries and already have a proper and familiar spelling, retain their original spelling. In Persian or Arabic, the same sound can be represented either by the diacritic ــَـ, or by the letter ع, either with diacritic as عَـ or as عا.

=== Consonants ===
While Turkmen Latin alphabet has 9 vowels and 21 consonants, the Turkmen Arabic alphabet has 32 consonants, as there are sounds that are represented by more than one consonant. The two letters, نگ are treated as one letter, as they are pronounced as a single sound.

No.	Letter	Latin equivalent	IPA	Example	Latin spelling	Meaning
1	ب	B b	[b]	باش	baş	'head'
2	پ	P p	[p]	پالتا	palta	'ax'
3	ت	T t	[t̪]	تانا	tana	'calf'
4	ث	S s	[θ]	ثمر	semer	'benefit'
5	ج	J j	[dʒ]	آجیٛ	ajy	'bitter'
6	چ	Ç ç	[tʃ]	چکیچ	çekiç	'hammer'
7	ح	H h	[h~x]	حو‌ْراز	horaz	'rooster'
8	خ	H h	[χ]	خان	han	'khan'
9	د	D d	[d̪]	داغ	dag	'mountain'
10	ذ	Z z	[ð]	ذلیل	zelil	'humiliated'
11	ر	R r	[ɾ~r]	بارماق	barmak	'finger'
12	ز	Z z	[ð]	آز	az	'a little'
13	ژ	Ž ž	[ʒ]	آژدار	aždar	'dragon'
14	س	S s	[θ]	سن	sen	'thou, you (sing.)'
15	ش	Ş ş	[ʃ]	آشاق	aşak	'down'
16	ص	S s	[θ]	صنم	Senem	'Senem'
17	ض	Z z	[ð]	ضرر	zerer	'loss'
18	ط	T t	[t̪]	خط	hat	'line; letter'
19	ظ	Z z	[ð]	ظالم	zalym	'tyrant'
20	ع		[ʔ]	عزیز	eziz	'dear'
21	غ	G g	[ɣ~ʁ]	باغ	bag	'garden'
22	ف	F f	[ɸ]	نفس	nefes	'breath'
23	ق	G g	[ɡ~ɢ]	قارا	gara	'black'
23	ق	K k	[k~q]	قاقا	kaka	'father'
24	ک	K k	[k]	کر	ker	'deaf'
25	گ	G g	[ɡ~ɢ]	گل	gel	'come!' (imperative)
26	ل	L l	[l~ɫ]	لال	lal	'mute'
27	م	M m	[m]	من	men	'I, me'
28	ن	N n	[n]	نار	nar	'pomegranate'
29	نگ	Ň ň	[ŋ~ɴ]	منگ	meň	'[skin] mole'
30	و	W w	[w]	آو	aw	'hunt'
31	ه / هـ	H h	[h]	هانی	hany	'Where is [it]?'
32	ی	Ý ý	[j]	یاز	ýaz	'spring'

==== Notes ====
Due to final-obstruent devoicing, native Turkmen words do not end in the letters ب b, د d or ج j. Instead, the letters پ p, ت t and چ ç are used in their place. However, this rule does not extend to loanwords, such as کبا'ب kebap. If as part of a suffix, a vowel is added to the end of a word ending in پ p, this final letter is then replaced with ب b instead. This rule does not apply to monosyllabic words. If the letter ب b is between two vowels, its pronunciation would be in between b [b] and w [β]. If a suffix is attached to a stem ending in چ ç, the consonant becomes voiced and the final letter is replaced with ج j. (E.g., دۆرتگۆچ dürtgüç → دۆرتگۆجی dürtgüji.) This rule, however, does not apply to monosyllable words like ساچ saç 'hair'.

The letter غ is never used at the beginning of a word, and it is only used in words where the Latin letter g produces a rhotic sound; otherwise, the letter ق is used. This rule does not extend to loanwords.

The Turkmen Arabic script also uses some letters exclusively for loanwords (even with the same phoneme):

- H: The letter ح is used only for loanwords; native words use the letter ه.
- S: The letters ث and ص are used only for loanwords; native words use the letter س.
- T: The letter ط is used only for loanwords; native words use the letter ت.
- Z: The letters ض ,ذ and ظ are used only for loanwords; native words use the letter ز.

==== Tashdid ====
Similar to Persian and Arabic, the tashdid diacritic ــّـ can be used to mark that a consonant is to be geminated, functionally similar to writing double consonants in Italian and Finnish. E.g.,

- قصّه kyssa
- ینگّه ýeňňe

There are two exceptions to where tashdid can be used. Firstly, if the double consonant is produced as a result of creating a compound word or addition of a suffix, then tashdid cannot be used and both consonants need to be written. For example, the word سۆممک sümmek is produced by adding the suffix -mek to the verb root süm. Thus, the correct spelling would be سۆممک (and not سۆمّک).

The second exception is, if a word has two consecutive identical consonants as a result of shift in pronunciation of a word, then both consonants need to be written. For example, the word بوْسسان bossan cannot be written as بوْسَان. This word is a Persian loanword, originally written as بوستان.

== Soviet latinisation campaign ==
After Turkmenistan was incorporated into the Soviet Union in 1921, the Turkmen Arabic alphabet was subsequently banned by Soviet authorities in an effort to limit influence from other parts of the Muslim world, and to compete with the Western word in terms of modernisation. As a result, a new Latin-based alphabet was introduced by 1929:

Jaꞑalif (1929–1940)
A a	B ʙ	C c	Ç ç	D d	E e	Ə ə	F f	G g	Ƣ ƣ	H h	I i
J j	K k	L ʟ	M m	N n	Ꞑ ꞑ	O o	Ɵ ɵ	P p	Q q	R r	S s
Ş ş	T t	U u	V v	X x	Y y	Z z	Ƶ ƶ	Ь ь

== Cyrillic script ==
After 1940, the Cyrillic alphabet was introduced, replacing the Yañalif-style alphabet. Between 1940 and 1994, the Turkmen language in the Turkmen SSR was exclusively in the Cyrillic script, while the Turkmen language in Iran and Afghanistan was still written in the Arabic script. After Turkmenistan gained independence from the Soviet Union, then-leader Saparmurat Niyazov devised a new Latin-based alphabet and made it the official script for Turkmen in 1994. However, particularly among older folks, the Cyrillic alphabet remains just as popular as the Latin alphabet.

The Turkmen Cyrillic alphabet
А а	Б б	В в	Г г	Д д	Е е	Ё ё	Ж ж	Җ җ	З з	И и	Й й
К к	Л л	М м	Н н	Ң ң	О о	Ө ө	П п	Р р	С с	Т т	У у
Ү ү	Ф ф	Х х	(Ц ц)	Ч ч	Ш ш	(Щ щ)	(Ъ ъ)	Ы ы	(Ь ь)	Э э	Ә ә
Ю ю	Я я

== Letter names and pronunciation ==
The Turkmen alphabet has 30 letters.

Letter	Name	IPA	Arabic
A, a	a	/ɑ ɑː/	آ / ع
B, b	be	/b/	ب
Ç, ç	çe	/ʧ/	چ
D, d	de	/d/	د
E, e	e	/e/	اِ
Ä, ä	ä	/æ/	أ
F, f	fe	/f~ɸ/	ف
G, g	ge	/ɡ/	گ
G, g	ge	/ʁ~ɣ/	غ
H, h	he	/χ~x/	خ
H, h	he	/h/	ھ / ح
I, i	i	/i/	ای
J, j	je	/ʤ/	ج
Ž, ž	že	/ʒ/	ژ
K, k	ka	/k/	ک
K, k	ka	/q/	ق
L, l	el	/l/	ل
M, m	em	/m/	م
N, n	en	/n/	ن
Ň, ň	eň	/ŋ/	نگ
O, o	o	/o/	وْ
Ö, ö	ö	/ø/	ؤ
P, p	pe	/p/	پ
R, r	er	/ɾ/	ر
S, s	es	/θ/	س / ث / ص
Ş, ş	şe	/ʃ/	ش
T, t	te	/t/	ت / ط
U, u	u	/u/	اۇ
Ü, ü	ü	/y/	اۆ
W, w	we	/w~β/	و
Y, y	y	/ɯ/	اؽ
Ý, ý	ýe	/j/	ی
Z, z	ze	/ð/	ز / ذ / ض / ظ

The names for Cc, Qq, Vv and Xx are se, ku, türk we and iks, respectively.

== Sample text ==
Article 1 of the UDHR:

Latin script (1999–present)	Arabic script	Latin script (used 1993–1999)	Latin script (used 1992–1993)	Cyrillic script
Hemme adamlar öz mertebesi we hukuklary boýunça deň ýagdaýda dünýä inýärler. Olara aň hem wyždan berlendir we olar bir-birleri bilen doganlyk ruhundaky garaýyşda bolmalydyrlar.	هممه آداملار اؤز مرتبه‌سی و حوُقوُقلارؽ بوْیوُنچا دنگ یاغدای‌دا دۆنیأ اینیأرلر. اوْلارا آنگ هم وؽجدان برلرن‌دیر و اوْلار بیر-بیرلری بیلن دوْغانلیق روُحوُن‌داقؽ قارایؽش‌دا بوْلمالؽ‌دؽرلار.	Hemme adamlar öz mertebesi we hukuklary boÿunça deñ ÿagdaÿda dünÿä inÿärler. Olara añ hem wyſdan berlendir we olar bir-birleri bilen doganlyk ruhundaky garaÿy¢da bolmalydyrlar.	Hemme adamlar qz mertebesi we hukuklarx boyunca deng yagdayda dvnyea inyearler. Olara ang hem wxjhdan berlendir we olar bir-birleri bilen doganlxk ruhundakx garayxshda bolmalxdxrlar.	Хемме адамлар өз мертебеси ве хукуклары боюнча дең ягдайда дүнйә инйәрлер. Олара аң хем выждан берлендир ве олар бир-бирлери билен доганлык рухундакы гарайышда болмалыдырлар.
Täzelip (used 1929–1940)	Arabic script (Turkmen SSR edition) (used 1923–1929)	Common Turkic alphabet	IPA transcription	Translation
Hemme adamʟar ɵz merteʙesi ve huquqʟarь ʙojunca deꞑ jaƣdajda dynjə injərʟer. Oʟara aꞑ hem vьƶdan ʙerʟendir ve oʟar ʙir-ʙirʟeri ʙiʟen doƣanʟьq ruhundaqь qarajьşda ʙoʟmaʟьdьrʟar.	ھەممە آداملار ٴاوز مەرتەبەسې ۋە حۇقۇقلارې بویۇنچا دەڭ یاغدای‌دا ٴدۇنیا اېنیارلەر. اولارا آڭ ھەم وېژدان بەرلەن‌دېر ۋە اولار ٴبېر-بېرلەرې بېلەن دوغانلېق رۇحۇن‌داقې قارایېش‌دا بولمالې‌دېرلار.	Hemme adamlar öz mertebesi ve huquqları boyunça deñ yağdayda dünyə inyərler. Olara añ hem vıjdan berlendir ve olar bir-birleri bilen doğanlıq ruhundaqı qarayışda bolmalıdırlar.	[he̞mˈme̞ ˌɑːd̪ɑmˈɫ̪ɑɾ ø̞ːð ˌme̞ɾt̪e̞be̞ˈθɪ βe̞ ˌhʊqʊqɫ̪ɑˈɾɯ ˌbo̞jʊn̪ˈt͡ʃɑ d̪e̞ŋ ˌjɑʁd̪ɑjˈd̪ɑ d̪ʏn̪ˈjæː ˌiːn̪jæːɾˈl̪e̞ɾ ‖ ˌo̞ɫ̪ɑˈɾɑ ɑːŋ he̞m βɯʒˈd̪ɑːn̪ ˌbe̞ɾl̪e̞n̪ˈd̪ɪɾ βe̞ o̞ˈɫ̪ɑɾ ˌbiːɾˌbiːɾl̪e̞ˈɾɪ bɪˈl̪e̞n̪ ˌd̪o̞ʁɑn̪ˈɫ̪ɯq ˌruːhʊn̪d̪ɑːˈqɯ ˌɢɑɾɑjɯʃt̪ɑ ˌbo̞ɫmɑɫ̪ɯd̪ɯɾˈɫ̪ɑɾ ‖]	All human beings are born free and equal in dignity and rights. They are endowed with reason and conscience and should act towards one another in a spirit of brotherhood.

== See also ==
- Turkmen Braille
