= Tatar alphabets =

Writing systems used for the Tatar language

Three scripts are currently used for the Tatar language: Cyrillic (in Russia, including the Republic of Tatarstan, where it is an official language and where the majority of speakers live, and in Kazakhstan), Latin (in Turkey, Finland, the Czech Republic, Poland, the US and Australia) and Arabic (in China).

== History of Tatar writing ==
Before 1928, the Tatar language was usually written using alphabets based on the Arabic alphabet: İske imlâ alphabet before 1920 and Yaña imlâ alphabet in 1920–1927. Some letters such as چ and پ were borrowed from the Persian alphabet and the letter ﯓ (called nef or sağır kef) was borrowed from Chagatai. The writing system was inherited from Volga Bulgar.

The most ancient of Tatar literature (Qíssai Yosıf by Qol-Ğäli, written in Old Tatar language) was created in the beginning of the 13th century. Until 1905 all literature was in Old Tatar, which was partly derived from the Bolgar language and not intelligible with modern Tatar. Since 1905 newspaper publishers started using modern Tatar. In 1918 the Arabic-based alphabet was revised: some new letters for Tatar sounds were added and some Arabic letters deleted. The Latin-based Jaꞑalif alphabet was in use between 1928 and 1939 and the Cyrillic-based alphabet has been used ever since.

Some scholars regard Institutiones linguae Turcicae libri quator ("The Basic Rules of the Turkic Language"), written in Latin by Hieronymus Megiser and printed in Leipzig in 1612, being the first example of a Turkic text printed in Arabic script, as a first printed Tatar book. Meanwhile, Hieronymus Megiser's Chorographia Tartariae published in 1611 describes a unique Tartarian alphabet and cites the Lord’s Prayer in the Tartarian language, written in Latin script. The first Turkic-Tatar printed publication in Russia appears to be Peter the Great's Manifest, printed in Arabic script and published in Astrakhan in 1722.

Printed books appeared en masse in 1801 when the first private typography ("Oriental typography") in Kazan appeared.

The first unsuccessful attempt to publish a Tatar newspaper was in 1808, when professor of mathematics at Kazan University, I.I. Zapolsky, proposed publishing a newspaper "The Kazan News" in both Russian and Tatar languages. Zapolsky's untimely death in 1810 thwarted the project. The first successful attempt to publish a newspaper in Tatar was in 1905. On 2 September, the first issue of the newspaper "Nur" was published in St. Petersburg by Gataulla Bayazitov. The second Tatar newspaper, "Kazan Muhbire," came into existence on 29 October 1905. The publisher of the newspaper was a member of the Kazan City Council, Saidgirey Alkin.

The first Tatar typewriter was created in Tatarstan in the 1920s and used the Arabic-based alphabet.

A Tatar alphabet book printed in 1778. Arabic script is used, Cyrillic text is in Russian.

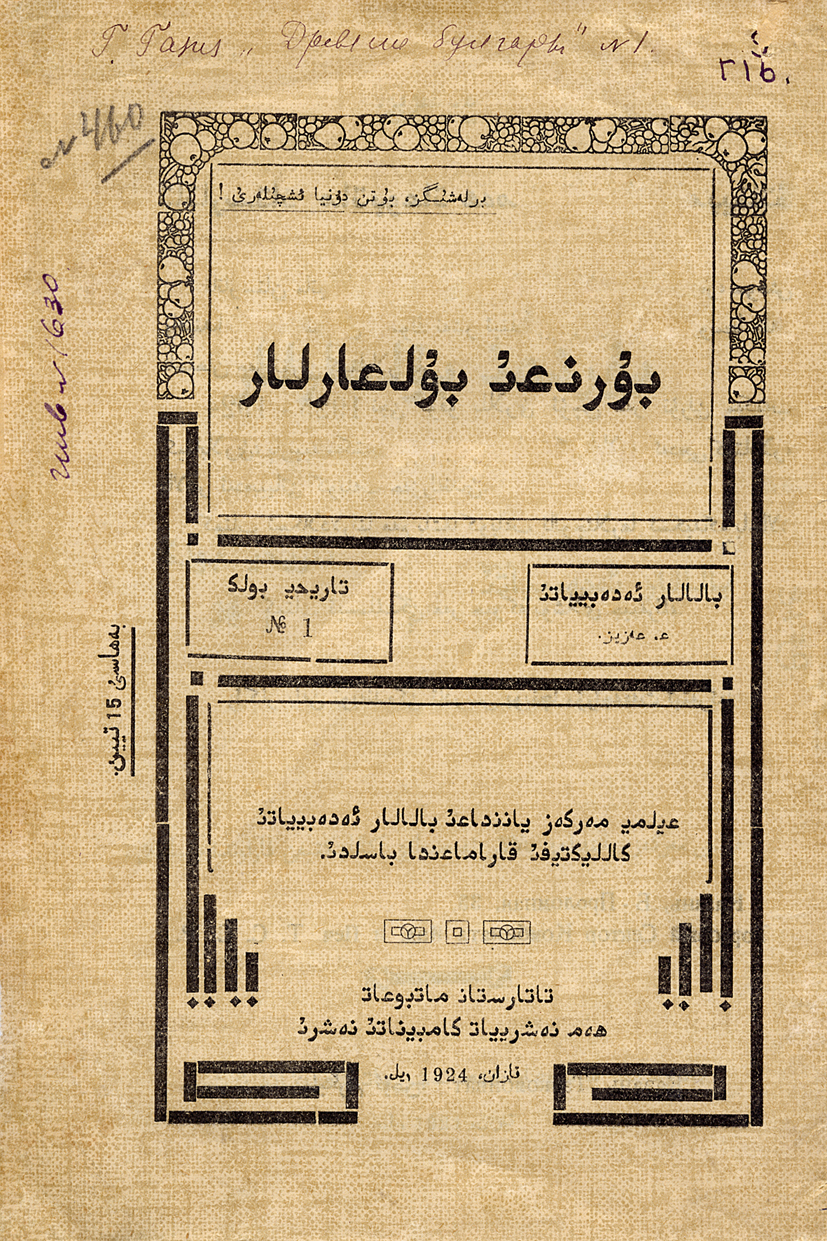
Cover page of a Yaña imlâ book printed in 1924

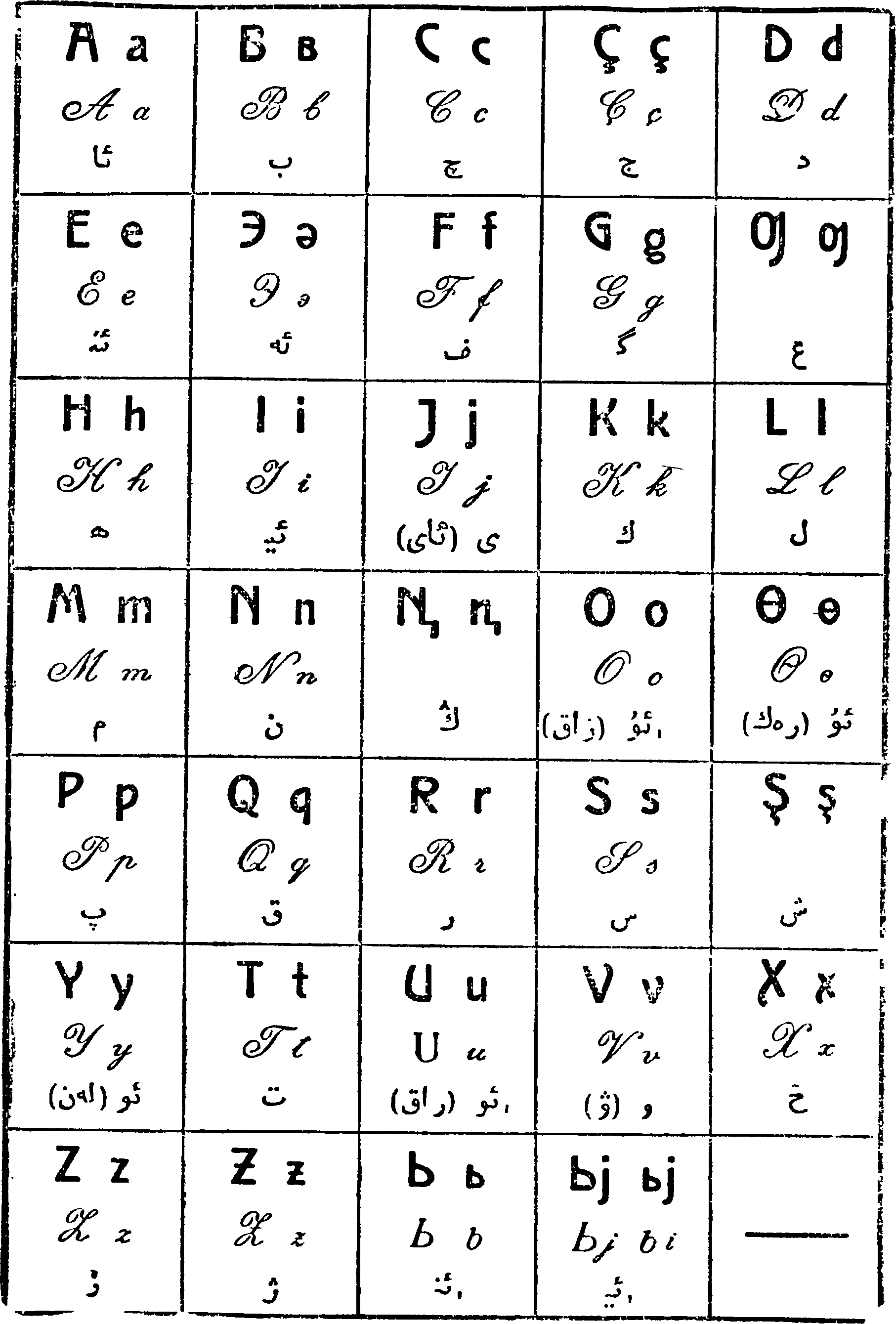
Yañalif table with Yaña imlâ correspondence, 1928
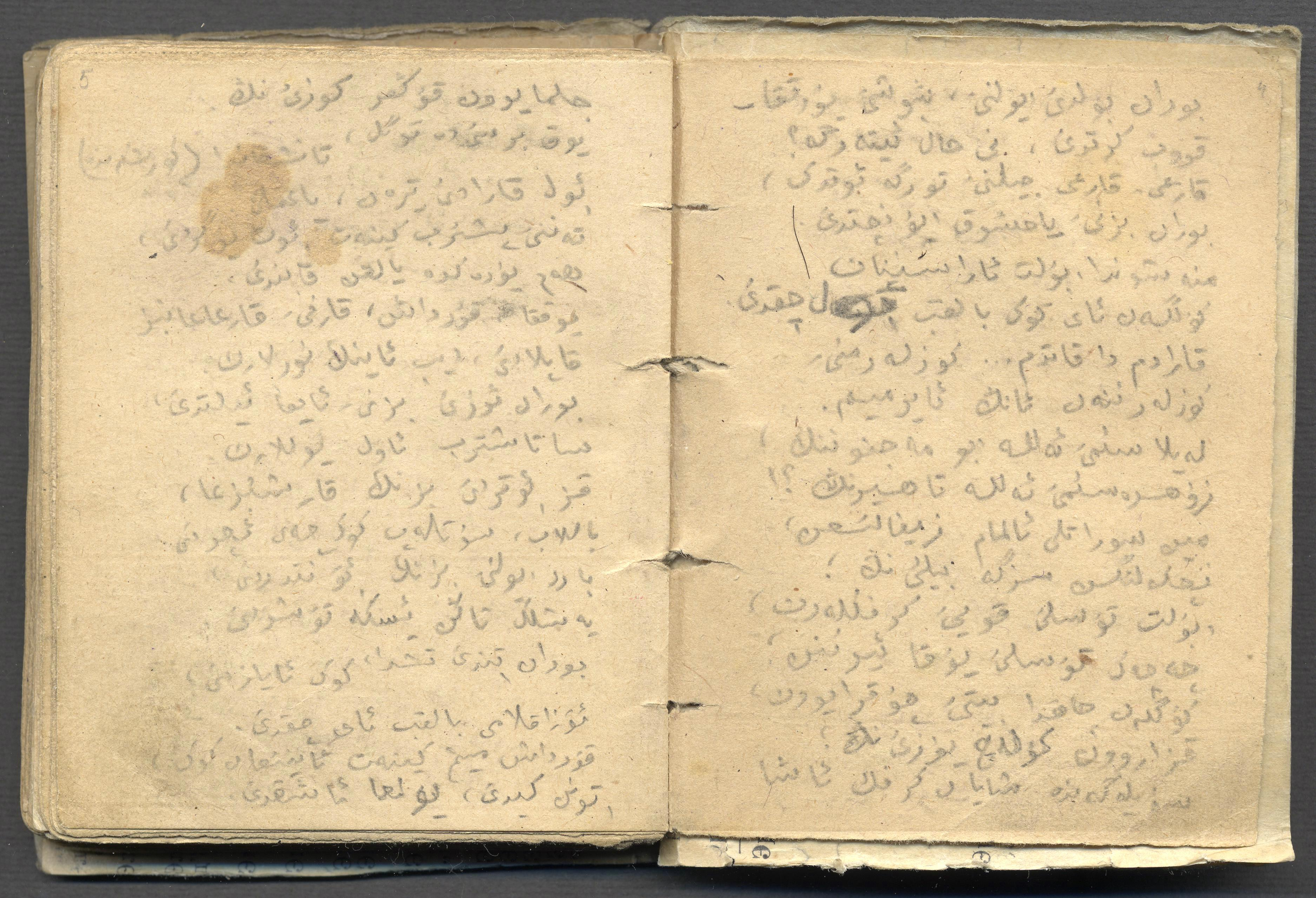
Page from Musa Cälil's Moabit Notebooks in Yaña imlâ, 1943–1944

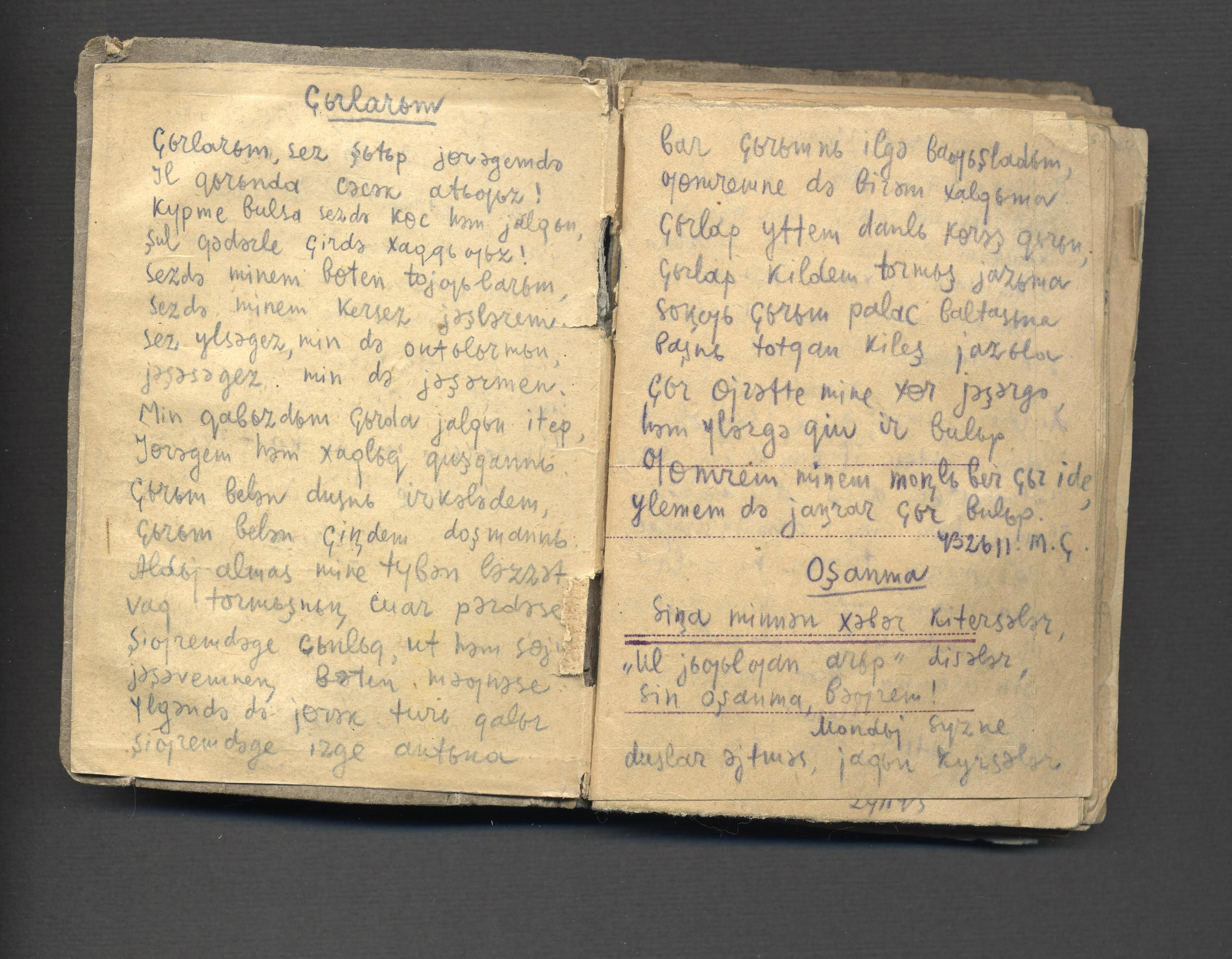
Page from Musa Cälil's Moabit Notebooks in Yañalif, 1943–1944

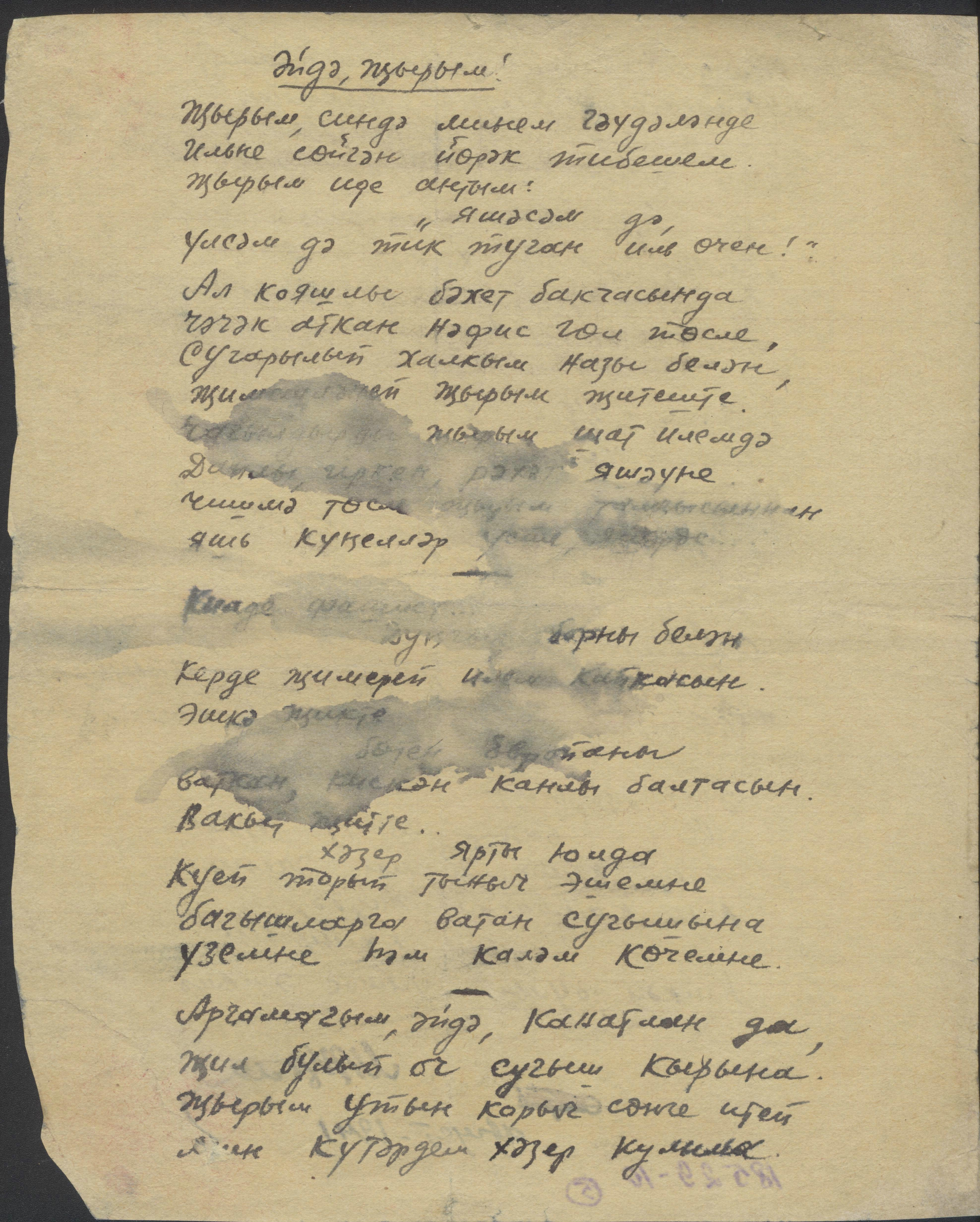
Manuscript by Musa Cälil in Cyrillic, 1941

In 1930s Turkey became a potential enemy of the Soviet Union. Even though Turkish alphabet, introduced in 1928, was different from Jaꞑalif, for Soviet officials the Latin script was a symbol of the Western world. This motivated switching all Turkic languages of the USSR to Cyrillic script.

This was not the first project of introducing Cyrillic script for the Tatar language. Since 1861, the Keräşens ethnic group had used Nikolay Ilminsky's alphabet, based on pre-1917 Russian orthography which used fita and dotted I to spell Orthodox proper names, additional Cyrillic letters Ӓ, Ӧ, Ӱ for Tatar vowels, and the ligature Ҥ for [ŋ]. This alphabet is related to the Mari alphabet, and was used because Christian Tatars couldn't use the Arabic script. By the 1930s, Ilminsky's alphabet was forgotten and could not be used due to its religious origin. In 1938 professor M. Fazlullin introduced an adaptation of the Russian alphabet for the Tatar language, without any additional characters. Tatar sounds absent from Russian were to be represented with the digraphs Жь, Нь, Хь, Аь, Уь, Оь, Ый.

In 1939 Qorbangaliev and Ramazanov offered their own projects that planned to use additional Cyrillic characters. Letters Ө, Ә, Ү, Һ were inherited from Jaꞑalif, but Җ and Ң were invented by analogy with Щ and Ц. ⟨Гъ⟩ and ⟨къ⟩ were suggested to designate [ʁ] and [q], spelled in Jaꞑalif as ⟨ƣ⟩ and ⟨q⟩ correspondingly. In Ramazanov's project [w] (Jaꞑalif ⟨v⟩) was spelled as ⟨в⟩ before a vowel, and as ⟨у⟩ or ⟨ү⟩ in the end of a syllable. On 5 May 1939, Presidium of the Supreme Soviet of Tatar ASSR issued the decree "On switching Tatar writing from the Latin-based alphabet to an alphabet based on Russian glyphs", which opened with a declaration that the switch was enacted "in response to numerous requests by Tatar workers, kolkhozniks, and intelligentsia." The Tatar society disagreed to this project, and during a conference in July 1940, the Cyrillic alphabet was amended. The updated alphabet was accepted on 10 January 1941.

Jaꞑalif	Proposed spelling (1939)	Accepted spelling (1940)	Meaning
ƣədət	гъәдәт	гадәт	"custom"
qar	къар	кар	"snow"
vaq	вакъ	вак	"small"
tav	тау	тау	"mountain"
dəv	дәү	дәү	"big"

[q] and [ʁ] are allophones of /k/ and /ɡ/ in the environment of back vowels, and the accepted spelling doesn't explicitly distinguish between the allophones in each pair. When ⟨га/го/гу/гы/ка/ко/ку/кы⟩ is followed by a "soft syllable", containing one of the front vowels ⟨ә, е, ө, и, ү⟩ or the soft sign ⟨ь⟩, they are pronounced as [ʁæ/ʁɵ/ʁy/ʁe/qæ/qɵ/qy/qe], otherwise as [ʁɑ/ʁo/ʁu/ʁɤ/qɑ/qo/qu/qɤ]. ⟨гә/гө/гү/ге/кә/кө/кү/ке⟩ are pronounced as [ɡæ/ɡɵ/ɡy/ɡe/kæ/kɵ/ky/ke]. Similar rules apply to ⟨е, ю, я⟩ which could be pronounced as either [je, jy, jæ] or [jɤ, ju, jɑ]. The soft sign is not used to show palatalization as in Russian, but to show qualities of vowels where they are not determinable through vowel harmony. Unlike modern Russian, some words can end with ⟨гъ⟩, representing [ʁ] after a front vowel, as in ⟨балигъ⟩ [bɑliʁ] ("baligh"). In total, the Tatar Cyrillic script requires the Russian alphabet plus 6 extra letters: Әә, Өө, Үү, Җҗ, Ңң, Һһ. All Russian loanwords are written as in Russian and should be pronounced with Russian pronunciation.

The complexity of the orthographic rules had led to discussions about amending the Tatar Cyrillic alphabet again; these included sessions in the Kazan branch of the Academy of Sciences of the Soviet Union (KFAN) which were conducted in January 1954 and in February–March 1959, but did not result in any specific proposal for a new alphabet. In 1972, prof. Nikolai Baskakov suggested three new letters to be added to the Tatar Cyrillic alphabet: Қ, Ғ and Ў for the sounds [q], [ʁ] and [w], to make the Tatar spelling phonetic. On 18 May 1989, the Orthographic Commission formed by the KFAN published the new alphabet, which included Baskakov's three new letters, and the new spelling rules. The new alphabetic order was as follows, with the new letters shown in brackets:

А Ә Б В [Ў] Г [Ғ] Д Е (Ё) Ж Җ З И Й К [Қ] Л М Н Ң О Ө П Р С Т У Ү Ф Х Һ Ц Ч Ш Щ Ъ Ы Ь Э Ю Я

Transcription	Accepted spelling (1940)	Proposed spelling (1989)	New Latin spelling (1999)	Meaning
[diqqæt]	дикъкать	диққәт	diqqət	"attention"
[qɑrlɤʁɑɕ]	карлыгач	қарлығач	qarlığaç	"swallow"
[qænæʁæt]	канәгать	қәнәғәт	qənəğət	"satisfied"
[jɤl]	ел	йыл	yıl	"year"
[jefæk]	ефәк	йефәк	yefək	"silk"
[jæm]	ямь	йәм	yəm	"charm"
[jynæleʃ]	юнәлеш	йүнәлеш	yünəleş	"direction"

The spelling system of 1940 had led to many homographs and near-homographs between Tatar and Russian which had totally different pronunciation, e.g., Tatar ⟨гарь⟩ [ʁær] "shame" and Russian ⟨гарь⟩ [ɡarʲ] "cinder". This presented difficulties for pupils learning the two spelling systems for the two languages simultaneously. One of the goals for the new spelling system was that the same sequence of letters would correspond to the same sounds, whether in a Russian word or in a Tatar word. Yet, the amended orthography was never formally adopted, as the popular opinion in the 1990s leaned towards switching to a Latin-based alphabet, instead of changing the Cyrillic one. Thus, on 20 July 1994, the Supreme Council of the Republic of Tatarstan approved a gradual transition to Latin-based script; the urgency of such transition was included in the resolution of the Second World Congress of the Tatars in 1997. Recognizing the popular demand, on 15 September 1999, the State Council of the Republic of Tatarstan issued the decree "On restoring the Tatar alphabet based on Latin glyphs". Despite the name of the decree, the new Latin alphabet was significantly different from Jaꞑalif, and its letters had one-to-one correspondence with the proposed Cyrillic alphabet from 1989. On 27 September 2000, the Cabinet of Ministers updated the new Latin alphabet, replacing the three uncommon characters inherited from Jaꞑalif (Ə, Ɵ, Ꞑ) with those present in Latin-1 encoding and in most computer fonts.

== Correspondence between alphabets ==
No.	Cyrillic			Arabic	Latin			Notes
No.	Modern alphabet (since 1940)	Fazlullin's proposal (1938)	Ilminsky's alphabet (1861)	Yaña imlâ (1920–1927)	Jaꞑalif (1927–1939)	Formerly official (1999–2000)	Zamanälif (2000–2005), standard romanization since 2012	Notes
1	А а			ئا	A a			
2	Б б			ب	B ʙ	B b		
3	В в			ۋ	V v	V v		in Russian words
3	В в			و	V v	W w		in native words
4	Г г			ﮒ	G g			in front-vowel syllables
4	Г г			ﻉ	Ƣ ƣ	Ğ ğ		in back-vowel syllables
5	Д д			ﺩ	D d			
6	Е е			ىُ	E e			after consonants
6	Е е			ىُ	Je je	Ye ye		after front vowels
6	Е е			ىُ	Jь jь	Yı yı		after back vowels
7	Ё ё	Е е		یؤ	Jo	Yo		only in Russian loanwords
8	Ж ж			ژ	Ƶ ƶ	J j		
9	З з			ﺯ	Z z			
10	И и			ئی	I i	İ i		
11	Й й			ی	J j	Y y		
12	К к			ك	K k			in front-vowel syllables
12	К к			ق	Q q			in back-vowel syllables
13	Л л			ل	L l			
14	М м			م	M m			
15	Н н			ن	N n			
16	О о			ࢭئۇ	O o			
17	П п			ﭖ	P p			
18	Р р			ﺭ	R r			
19	С с			ﺱ	S s			
20	Т т			ت	T t			
21	У у			ࢭئو	U u			
22	Ф ф			ف	F f			
23	Х х			ﺡ	X x			
24	Ц ц			تس	Ts ts			only in Russian loanwords
25	Ч ч			ﭺ	C c	Ç ç		
26	Ш ш			ﺵ	Ş ş			
27	Щ щ			شچ	Şc şc	Şç şç		only in Russian loanwords
28	Ъ ъ							
29	Ы ы			ࢭىُ	Ь ь	I ı		
30	Ь ь							
31	Э э			ىُ	E e			
32	Ю ю			یو	Ju ju	Yu yu		in back-vowel syllables
32	Ю ю			یو	Jy jy	Yü yü		in front-vowel syllables
33	Я я			یا	Ja ja	Ya ya		in back-vowel syllables
33	Я я			یا	Jə jə	Yə yə	Yä yä	in front-vowel syllables
34	Ә ә	Аъ аъ	Ӓ ӓ (Я я)	ئە	Ə ə		Ä ä	
35	Ө ө	Оъ оъ	Ӧ ӧ	ئۇ	Ɵ ɵ		Ö ö	
36	Ү ү	Уъ уъ	Ӱ ӱ (Ю ю)	ئو	Y y	Ü ü		
37	Җ җ	Жъ жъ	Ж ж	ﺝ	Ç ç	C c		
38	Ң ң	Нъ нъ	Ҥ ҥ	ڭ	Ꞑ ꞑ		Ñ ñ	
39	Һ һ	Хъ хъ	Х х	ھ	H h			

Before the 1980s, in the listing of the alphabet, extra letters were placed after the Russian ones, as shown above. The Tatar Parliament changed the alphabetic order in January 1997 to the one shown below.

== Cyrillic version ==
The official Cyrillic version of the Tatar alphabet used in Tatarstan contains 39 letters:

А Ә Б В Г Д Е (Ё) Ж Җ З И Й К Л М Н Ң О Ө П Р С Т У Ү Ф Х Һ Ц Ч Ш Щ Ъ Ы Ь Э Ю Я

=== Letter names and pronunciation ===
Letters and symbols of the Tatar Cyrillic alphabet
Cyrillic version (Capital)	Cyrillic version (Small)	ISO-9	Name	Pronunciation
А	а	a	а /a/	[a]; [ɑ]
Ә	ә	ä	ә /æ/	[æ]
Б	б	b	бэ /be/	[b]
В	в	v	вэ /ve/	[v]; [w]
Г	г	g	гэ /ɡe/	[ɡ]; [ʁ]
Д	д	d	дэ /de/	[d]
Е	е	ê	йе /je/ йы /jɤ/	[je]; [jɘ]; [jɤ]; [e]; [ɘ]
Ё	ё	ô	йо /jo/	[jo]
Ж	ж	ž	жэ /ʒe/	[ʒ]
Җ	җ	ẓ̌	җэ /ʑe/	[ʑ]
З	з	z	зэ /ze/	[z]
И	и	i	и /i/	[i]
Й	й	j	кыска и /qɤsˈqɑ ˈi/	[j]
К	к	k	ка /qɑ/	[k]; [q]
Л	л	l	эль /el/	[l]; [ɫ]
М	м	m	эм /em/	[m]
Н	н	n	эн /en/	[n]
Ң	ң	ņ	эң /eŋ/	[ŋ]; [ɴ]
О	о	o	о /o/	[o]
Ө	ө	ô	ө /ø/	[ɵ]
П	п	p	пэ /pe/	[p]
Р	р	r	эр /er/	[r]
С	с	s	эс /es/	[s]
Т	т	t	тэ /te/	[t]
У	у	u	У /u/	[u]; [w]
Ү	ү	ù	Ү /y/	[ʉ]; [w]
Ф	ф	f	эф /ef/	[f]
Х	х	h	ха /xa/	[x]
Һ	һ	ḩ	һэ /he/	[h]
Ц	ц	c	цэ /tse/	[t͡s]
Ч	ч	č	чэ /ɕe/	[ɕ; t͡ɕ]
Ш	ш	š	ша /ʃa/	[ʃ]
Щ	щ	ŝ	ща /ʃɕa/	[ʃɕ]
Ъ	ъ	”	калынлык билгесе /qɑlɤnˈlɤq bilɡeˈse/	[ʔ]
Ы	ы	y	ы /ɤ/	[ɤ]
Ь	ь	’	нечкәлек билгесе /neɕkæˈlek bilɡeˈse/	[ʔ]
Э	э	e	э /e/	[e]; [ɘ]; [ʔ]
Ю	ю	û	йу /ju/	[ju]; [jʉ]
Я	я	â	йа /ja/	[ja]; [jɑ]; [jæ]

/ʔ/, which is found in loanwords, is written ⟨э⟩ at the end of a syllable: маэмай. After a closed front-vowel syllable, it is written ⟨ь⟩, and after a closed back-vowel syllable, it is written ⟨ъ⟩: җөрьәт, Акъәби. Between vowels it is not written; rather, it is the absence of hamza that is marked: Гаишә (3 syllables, vs. Гайшә for 2). If, however, the second vowel is ⟨ы⟩ /ɤ/, the letter ⟨э⟩ is used for the syllable /ʔɤ/: кариэ.

== Latin version ==
According to the decree "On restoring the Tatar alphabet based on Latin glyphs" from 1999, the new Latin alphabet would be in official use alongside the Cyrillic alphabet from 1 September 2001, and would become the sole alphabet in official use by 1 September 2011. Around the same time, the Republic of Karelia was pursuing official status for Karelian language, which also uses a Latin-based alphabet. The Russian State Duma perceived the latinization of the two republics as a variety of language secessionism, and on 15 November 2002, they introduced an amendment into the law On the languages of the peoples of the Russian Federation stating that all official languages of the republics within the Russian Federation must use Cyrillic alphabets unless a new federal law states otherwise.

The Republic of Tatarstan challenged the amendment in the Constitutional Court of Russia, arguing that the State Duma doesn't have authority over the language policies of the constituent republics. On 16 November 2004, the Constitutional Court declined the appeal. To comply with the court's decision, the decree "On restoring the Tatar alphabet based on Latin glyphs" was officially rescinded on 22 January 2005.

On 24 December 2012, a new Tatarstani law clarified that the new Latin alphabet, as specified in 2000, should be used as the official romanization for the Tatar language. It also specified Yaña imlâ as the official system for transliteration into the Arabic script. According to this law, requests to Tatarstani authorities may use the Latin and Arabic scripts, but the authorities' answers would be written in Cyrillic, with an optional transliteration into the other alphabets. As of 2020, Cyrillic remains the only official script in Tatarstan.

Zamanälif-2 (Tatar for "modern alphabet") contains 34 letters:

A, Ä, B, C, Ç, D, E, F, G, Ğ, H, I, İ, J, K, L, M, N, Ñ, O, Ö, P, Q, R, S, Ş, T, U, Ü, V, W, X, Y, Z.

There are 10 vowels and 25 consonants. In addition to the ISO basic Latin alphabet, the following 9 letters are used: Çç, Ğğ, Şş, Ññ, Ää, Öö, Üü, Iı, İi.

Tatar vowels are: a/ä, o/ö, u/ü, ıy/i, ı/e.

The symbol ⟨'⟩ is used for the glottal stop (known as hämzä in Tatar).

Tatar writing is largely phonetic, meaning that the pronunciation of a word can usually be derived from its spelling. This rule excludes recent loanwords, such as summit and names.

In 2024, the modified Common Turkic Alphabet replaced letter ä with ə, which was already in use in Azerbaijani, as well as among Tatar activists using the Latin alphabet. This way of writing has been named as "Neo-alif" (Neo-əlif) by some Tatar activists. It disregards letter ä mainly due to its abundant occurrence in Tatar words compared to the other umlaut letters, creating an "undesired aesthetic outcome". (Compare: kübäläklär –> kübələklər; 'butterflies').

"Tatarça Diktant", a global event organized in 2024, had recitations of Tatar poems that were translated into the Latin Neo-alif alphabet. The event was sponsored by official bodies such as the Ministry of Youth of Tatarstan and Kazan Federal University. Its purpose was "aimed at uniting lovers of the Tatar language, increasing interest in writing correctly and learning the literary Tatar language".

In Finland, while ä is found in Finnish, the Tatar community has traditionally tried to use only letters found in Turkish, and thus, have replaced it with e. This has left both the [e] and [ɯ] (ı) sounds as ı (keçkenä / keçkenə, kıçkıne; 'small' (Note: This mixes Tatar front and back vowels; if using e as [æ], a more correct spelling would be kiçkine, which then leaves letter i as the e-sound.)). Nowadays however the spelling has had more influence from Tatarstan .

=== Letter names and pronunciation ===
Position in alphabet	Latin character	Name in Latin	Name in Cyrillic	IPA Transcription
1	A a	A	А	a, ɑ
2	Ä ä / Ə ə	Ä, noqtalı A	Ә, нокталы А	æ
3	B b	Bé	Бэ	b
4	C c	Cé	Җэ	ʑ
5	Ç ç	Çé	Чэ	ɕ, t͡ɕ
6	D d	Dé	Дэ	d
7	E e	E	Э	e, ɘ
8	F f	Éf	Эф	f
9	G g	Gé	Ге	ɡ
10	Ğ ğ	Ğé	Гъэ	ʁ
11	H h	Hé	Һэ	h
12	İ i	I	И	i
13	I ı	I	Ы	ɤ
14	J j	Jé	Жэ	ʒ
15	K k	Ké	Ке	k
16	L l	El	Эль	l, ɫ
17	M m	Ém	Эм	m
18	N n	Én	Эн	n
19	Ñ ñ	Éñ	Эң	ŋ, ɴ
20	O o	O	О	o
21	Ö ö	Ö, noqtalı O	Ө, нокталы О	ɵ
22	P p	Pé	Пэ	p
23	Q q	Qu	Ку	q
24	R r	Ér	Эр	r
25	S s	És	Эс	s
26	Ş ş	Şa	Ша	ʃ
27	T t	Té	Тэ	t
28	U u	U	У	u
29	Ü ü	Ü, noqtalı U	Ү, нокталы У	ʉ
30	V v	Vé	Вэ	v
31	W w	Wé	Вэ (Уэ)	w
32	X x	Xá	Ха	x
33	Y y	Yé	Йэ	j, ɪ
34	Z z	Zet	Зет	z
	ʼ	Hämzä	Һәмзә	ʔ

== Sample of the scripts ==
Article 1 of the Universal Declaration of Human Rights:

Iske imlâ	Yaña imlâ	Yañalif	Cyrillic	Zamanälif	English translation
بارلق كشیلردە آزاد هم اوز آبرویلری هم حقوقلری یاغیندن تڭ بولوب طوەلر. آلرغە عقل هم وجدان بیرلگن هم بر-برسینە قاراتە طوغنلرچە مناسبتدە بولورغە تیوشلر.	بارلق كشىُلەر دە ئازاد ھەم ئوز ئابرویلارىُ ھەم حۇقوقلارىُ یاعننان تیڭ ࢭبولب توالار. ئالارعا ئاقل ھەم وۇجدان بیرلگەن ھەم بر-برسىُنە قاراتا توعاننارچا مۇناسەبەتتە بولرعا تییشلەر.	Barlьq keşelər də azat həm yz aʙrujlarь həm xoquqlarь jaƣьnnan tiꞑ ʙulьp tualar. Alarƣa aqьl həm vɵçdan ʙirelgən həm ʙer-ʙersenə qarata tuƣannarca mɵnasəʙəttə ʙulьrƣa tieşlər.	Барлык кешеләр дә азат һәм үз абруйлары һәм хокуклары ягыннан тиң булып туалар. Аларга акыл һәм вөҗдан бирелгән һәм бер-берсенә карата туганнарча мөнасәбәттә булырга тиешләр.	Barlıq keşelär dä azat häm üz abruyları häm xoquqları yağınnan tiñ bulıp tualar. Alarğa aqıl häm wöcdan birelgän häm ber-bersenä qarata tuğannarça mönasäbättä bulırğa tieşlär.	All human beings are born free and equal in dignity and rights. They are endowed with reason and conscience and should act towards one another in a spirit of brotherhood.

== See also ==
- Tatar language
- Law on languages of peoples of the Russian Federation — introduced as a reaction to Tatarstan's attempt to switch the Tatar language from the Cyrillic alphabet to the Latin alphabet
