= Lezgin alphabets =

Alphabets used to write the Lezgin language

The Lezgin language has been written in several different alphabets over the course of its history. These alphabets have been based on three scripts: Perso-Arabic script, Latin script, and Cyrillic script.

== History ==
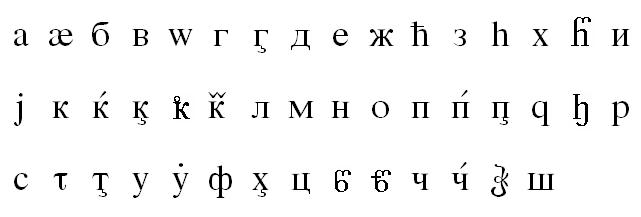
Lezgin Cyrillic alphabet of 1911

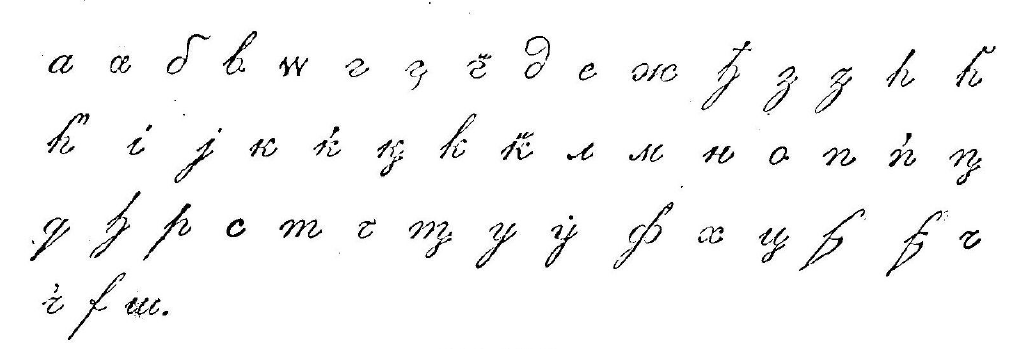
1871 Lezgin alphabet

Until 1928, Lezgin was written in Arabic script, which was taught in religious schools. In the early 1920s, it was used in a few secular textbooks.

In parallel with the Arabic alphabet, as alphabet based on Cyrillic compiled by Baron Peter von Uslar in the 1860s was used. In 1911, a slightly modified version of this alphabet was published as a primer used in secular schools.

In 1928, under the Soviet Union's process of Romanization, a Lezgin Latin alphabet was created and this was altered in 1932.

In 1938, as with most other Soviet languages, a new Cyrillic alphabet was created for Lezgin. Changes after its introduction include adding the letter Ё ё and replacing УӀ уӀ with Уь уь. This alphabet is still used in various publications.

== Lezgin Arabic alphabet ==
The Lezgin Perso-Arabic alphabet was as follows:

چ	خ	ح	ج	ث	ت	ب	ا
ض	ص	ڕ	ژ	ز	ر	ذ	د
ق	ڤ	ف	ڠ	غ	ع	ظ	ط
ه	ە	ن	م	ڵ	ل	گ	ک
ی	ؤ	و	ۀ

== Lezgin Latin alphabet 1928–32 ==
The Latin alphabet of 1928–1932's displayed all phonemes in contrast to the current alphabet but did not differentiate aspirated and non-aspirated consonants (k and kʰ, p-pʰ, t-tʰ, q-qʰ, t͡ʃ-t͡ʃʰ, and t͡s-t͡sʰ). The alphabet was as follows:

а	b	c	сс	ꞓ	ç	d	е
ə	f	g	ƣ	h	i	j	k
kk	ⱪ	l	m	n	о	ɵ	p
pp		q	ꝗ	r	s	ş	t
tt		u	v	x	ҳ	ӿ	y
z	ƶ	~~s~~	~~ss~~	ⱬ	'

== Lezgin Latin alphabet 1932–38 ==
The first Latin alphabet was changed in 1932 as follows:

а	b	c	ç	d	e	f	g
ƣ	h	i	j	k	ⱪ	l	m
n	o	p		q	ꝗ	r	s
ş	t		u	v	x	ҳ	ӿ
y	z	ⱬ	ƶ	'

== Lezgin Cyrillic alphabet ==
There are 54 consonants in Lezgin. Aspiration is not normally indicated in the orthography, despite the fact that it is phonemic. The current Lezgin Cyrillic alphabet is as follows:

А а	Б б	В в	Г г	Гъ гъ	Гь гь	Д д	Е е
Ё ё	Ж ж	З з	И и	Й й	К к	Къ къ	Кь кь
КI кl	Л л	М м	Н н	О о	П п	ПI пl	Р р
С с	Т т	ТI тl	У у	Уь уь	Ф ф	Х х	Хъ хъ
Хь хь	Ц ц	ЦI цl	Ч ч	ЧI чl	Ш ш	Ъ ъ
Ы ы	Ь ь	Э э	Ю ю	Я я

Notes:

- щ is used only in words borrowed from Russian language but is pronounced ш
- ё is used in only one word, ёъ (Lezgian pronunciation: [joʔ])
- ы ([ə]) is very common in Lezgin dialects
- ь (the soft sign) is only used in Lezgin appended to other letters to form different phonemes (гь, хь, уь, кь). Lezgin has no soft phonemes and the ь is not used to denote palatalization, even in borrowed words (where it is not written; e.g., автомобил, мултфилм).

== Comparative table of Lezgin alphabets ==
Arabic	Latin 1932–1938	Cyrillic	IPA
آ	A a	А а	a
ب	B b	Б б	b
و	V v	В в	w/v
گ	G g	Г г	g
غ	Ƣ ƣ	Гъ гъ	ʁ
ﻫ	H h	Гь гь	h
د	D d	Д д	d
اه	E e	Е е	je/e
د	-	Ё ё	jo
ژ	Ƶ ƶ	Ж ж	ʒ
ز	Z z	З з	z
اى	I i	И и	i
ی	J j	Й й	j
ک	K k	К к	kʰ/k
ڠ	Q q	Къ къ	q
ق	Ꝗ ꝗ	Кь кь	q'
ࢰ	Ⱪ ⱪ	КӀ кӀ	k'
ل	L l	Л л	l
م	M m	М м	m
ن	N n	Н н	n
اۊ	O o	О о	o
پ	P p	П п	pʰ/p
ڢ		ПӀ пӀ	p'
ر	R r	Р р	r
س	S s	С с	s
ت	T t	Т т	tʰ/t
ط	T̨ t̨	ТӀ тӀ	t'
او	U u	У у	u
اۈ	Y y	Уь уь	y
ف	F f	Ф ф	f
خ	X x	Х х	χ
څ	Ӿ ӿ	Хъ хъ	qʰ
ݤ	Ҳ ҳ	Хь хь	x
ص	S̷ s̷	Ц ц	t͡sʰ/t͡s
ڗ	Ⱬ ⱬ	ЦӀ цӀ	t͡s'
چ	C c	Ч ч	t͡ʃʰ/t͡ʃ
ج	Ç ç	ЧӀ чӀ	t͡ʃ'
ش	Ş ş	Ш ш	ʃ
	-	Щ щ	-
ء	-	ъ	ʔ
	-	Ы ы	-
	-	ь	-
اه	E e	Э э	e
	-	Ю ю	ju/y
	-	Я я	ja/æ
