= Yañalif =

1920s–30s Soviet Latin alphabet for Turkic languages

Yañalif Jaꞑa Əlifʙa
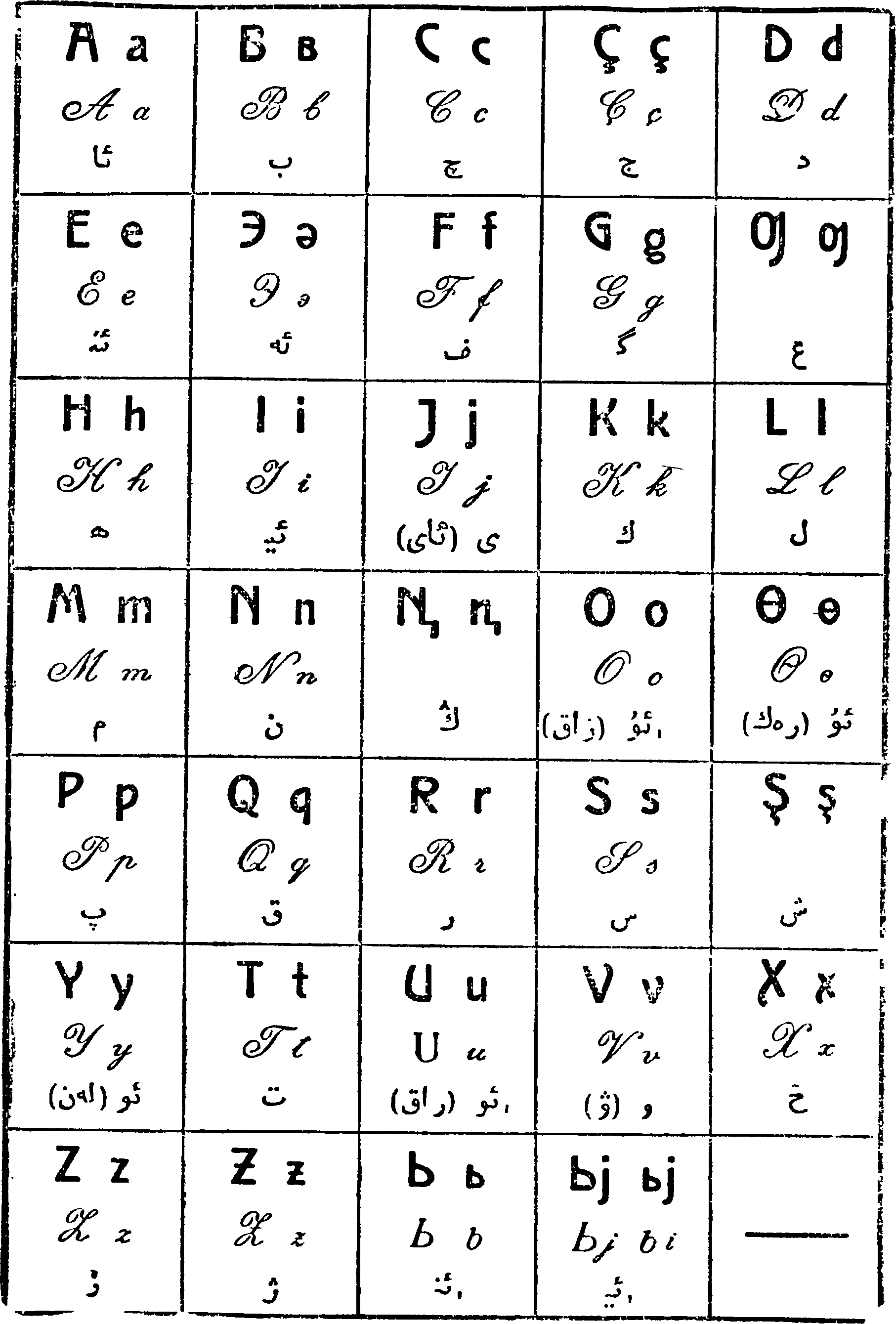
- Script type: Alphabet
- Creator: Various, primarily during the Latinisation in the Soviet Union
- Period: 1924 – 1940
- Languages: Languages of the Soviet Union

Related scripts
- Parent systems: Egyptian hieroglyphs: Proto-Sinaitic alphabet; Phoenician alphabet; Greek alphabet; Old Italic scripts; Latin alphabet augmented by Cyrillic script; Yañalif
- Sister systems: Unified Northern Alphabet

Unicode
- Unicode range: Subset of Latin, with some Cyrillic characters

The New Turkic Alphabet, known in Turkic languages as Yañalif (Tatar: jaꞑa əlifʙa / jaꞑalif, pronounced [jɑˈŋɑ ælʲifˈbɑ] / [jɑŋɑˈlʲif]; lit. 'new alphabet' or 'Neo-Alphabet'), is the first Latin alphabet used during the Latinisation in the Soviet Union in the 1930s for the Turkic languages. It replaced the Arabic script-based alphabets like Yaña imlâ used for Tatar in 1928, and was replaced by the Cyrillic alphabet in 1938–1940. After their respective independence in 1991, several former Soviet states in Central Asia switched back to Latin script, with slight modifications to the original Yañalif.

There are 33 letters in Yañalif, nine of which are vowels. The apostrophe (') is used for the glottal stop (həmzə or hämzä) and is sometimes considered a letter for the purposes of alphabetic sorting. Other characters may also be used in spelling foreign names. The lowercase form of the letter B is ʙ (small caps B), to prevent confusion with Ь ь (I with bowl). Letter No. 33 looks exactly like Cyrillic soft sign (Ь); Unicode has rejected separate encoding. Capital Ə (schwa) also looks like Russian/Cyrillic Э in some fonts. There is also a digraph in Yañalif (Ьj ьj).

== History ==
The earliest written text in a Kipchak language, specifically the Cuman language, an ancestor of the modern Tatar language and written with Latin characters, is the Codex Cumanicus, dated 1303. Such texts were used by Catholic missionaries to the Golden Horde. Their Latin script ceased to be used after Gazaria was taken over by the Ottoman Empire in the 15th century.

For centuries some Tatar languages as well as some other Turkic languages used a modified Arabic alphabet, İske imlâ. The deficiencies of this alphabet were both technical (abundance of positional letterforms complicated adoption of modern technology such as typewriters and teleprinters) and linguistic (Arabic language has only three vowel qualities, but Tatar has nine, which had to be mapped onto combinations and variations of the three existing vowel letters). Because of this some Turkic intelligentsia tended to use the Latin or Cyrillic script. The first attempts appeared in the mid-19th century among Azerbaijanis. At the same period the Russian missionary Nikolay Ilminsky, along with followers, invented a modified Russian alphabet for the Turkic peoples of Idel-Ural, for the purpose of Christianization; Muslim Tatars did not use his alphabet.

In 1908–1909 the Tatar poet Säğit Rämiyev started to use the Latin script in his works. He used several digraphs: ea for [æ], eu for [y], eo for [ɵ] and ei for [ɯ]. Arabists turned down his project, preferring to reform İske imlâ. The simplified Arabic script, known as Yaña imlâ, was used in 1920–1927.

During the Latinisation in the Soviet Union, a special Central Committee for a New Alphabet was established in Moscow. The first project for a Tatar-Bashkir Latin alphabet was published in ئشچی (Eşce, "The Worker") newspaper on 18 July 1924. Sounds specific to the Bashkir language were written with digraphs. Following the publication, the Latin Dustь ("friend of the Latin") society was formed in Kazan on 16 November 1924. It suggested its own version of Tatar Latin alphabet, which didn't cover Bashkir sounds.

In 1926 the Congress of Turkologists in Baku recommended to switch all Turkic languages to the Latin script. In April 1926 the Jaꞑa Tatar Əlifвasь / Yaña tatar älifbası / Яңа Татар Әлифбасы (New Tatar Alphabet) society started its work at Kazan.

On July 3, 1927, Tatarstan officials declared Yañalif the official script of the Tatar language, replacing the Yaña imlâ script. The first variant of Yañalif did not have separate letters for K and Q (realized as K) and for G and Ğ (realized as G), V and W (realized as W). Ş (sh) looked like the Cyrillic letter Ш (she). C and Ç were realized as in Turkish and the modern Tatar Latin alphabet and later were transposed in the final version of Yañalif.

In 1928 Yañalif was reformed and remained in active use for 12 years. Some sources claim that this alphabet had 34 letters, but the last was a digraph Ьj, used for the corresponding Tatar diphthong. Another source states that the 34th letter was an apostrophe. They also give another sorting of the alphabet. (Ə after A, Ь after E)

After the introduction of Yañalif most of the books which were printed in the Arabic alphabet were withdrawn from libraries.

| No. | Final version (1928–1940) | Original version (1927) | Latin Dustь project (1924) | Eşce project (1924) | Yaña imlâ, stand-alone form | Modern Latin Tatar alphabet and romanization of Bashkir | modern Cyrillic Tatar alphabet + some Bashkir Cyrillic | IPA |
|---|---|---|---|---|---|---|---|---|
| 1 | A a | | | | ئا | A a | А а | /a/ |
| 2 | B ʙ | B b | B ʙ | B b | ب | B b | Б б | /b/ |
| 3 | C c | Ç/C̦ ç/c̦ | | C c | چ | Ç ç | Ч ч | /tɕ/ |
| 4 | Ç/C̦ ç/c̦ | C c | Ĝ ĝ | J j | ج | C c | Җ җ | /dʑ, ʑ/ |
| 5 | D d | | | | د | D d | Д д | /d/ |
| | Đ đ | | | Dh dh | ذ | Ź ź | Ҙ ҙ | /ð, dz/ |
| 6 | E e | | | Э э | ئـ | E e | Е е (э) | /e/ |
| 7 | Э/Ə/Ǝ ə | Э/Ə/Ǝ ə | Ä ä | E e | ئە | Ä ä | Ә ә | /æ/ |
| 8 | F f | | | | ف | F f | Ф ф | /f/ |
| 9 | G g | G g | G g | | گ | G g | Г г | /g/ |
| 10 | Ƣ ƣ | G g | Gh gh | Ĝ ĝ | ع | Ğ ğ | Г г | /ɣ/ |
| 11 | H h | | | | ھ | H h | Һ һ | /h/ |
| 12 | I i | | | | ئی | İ i | И и | /i/ |
| 13 | J j | | | | ی | Y y | Й й | /j/ |
| 14 | K k | | | | ك | K k | К к | /k/ |
| 15 | L l | | | | ل | L l | Л л | /l/ |
| 16 | M m | | | | م | M m | М м | /m/ |
| 17 | N n | | | | ن | N n | Н н | /n/ |
| 18 | Ꞑ ꞑ | | Ng ng | Ꞑ ꞑ | ڭ | Ñ ñ | Ң ң | /ŋ/ |
| 19 | O o | | | | ࢭئۇ | O o | О о | /o/ |
| 20 | Ɵ ɵ | Ó ó | Ö ö | | ئۇ | Ö ö | Ө ө | /ø/ |
| 21 | P p | | | | پ | P p | П п | /p/ |
| 22 | Q q | K k | Q q | | ق | Q q | К к | /q/ |
| 23 | R r | | | | ر | R r | Р р | /r/ |
| 24 | S s | | | | س | S s | С с | /s/ |
| 25 | Ş/Ș ş/ș | Ш ш | Ş/Ș ş/ș | Ç/C̦ ç/c̦ | ش | Ş ş | Ш ш | /ʃ/ |
| 26 | T t | | | | ت | T t | Т т | /t/ |
| | Ѣ ѣ | | | Th th | ث | Ś ś | Ҫ ҫ | /ɕ, θ/ |
| 27 | U u | | | | ࢭئو | U u | У у | /u, w/ |
| 28 | V v | W w | | V v | ۋ | V v | В в | /v/ |
| 28 | V v | W w | W w | | و | W w | В в | /w/ |
| 29 | X x | | | | ح | X x | Х х | /x/ |
| 30 | Y/У y | V v | Ü ü | | ئو | Ü ü | Ү ү | /w, y/ |
| 31 | Z z | | | | ز | Z z | З з | /z/ |
| 32 | Ƶ ƶ | | | | ژ | J j | Ж ж | /ʒ/ |
| 33 | Ь ь | É é | Y y | Ə ə | ࢭئـ | I ı | Ы ы | /ɯ, ɤ, ɨ/ |
| (34.1) | ʼ | | | | ء | ʼ | ъ, ь, э | /ʔ/ |
| (34.2) | Ьj ьj | Y y | Yj yj | Y y | ࢭئیـ | Iy ıy | Ый ый | /ɤj/ |

Eşce (1924) alphabetical order:

A B C Ç D Dh E F G Ĝ H I J K L M N Ꞑ O Ö P Q R S T Th U Ü W V X Y Z Ƶ Ə Э

Latin dustь (1924) alphabetical order:

A B Ĝ Ç D E Ä Y F Gh G H I J Q K L M N Ng Ö O P R S T U Ü W X Z Ƶ Ş

Original Yañalif (1927) alphabetical order:

A B C Ç D E É Э F G H I J K L M N Ꞑ O Ó P R S T U V X Y Z Ƶ Ш W

== Decline ==
Using two different alphabets for Russian and Turkic languages was problematic: people had to learn two different alphabets, confusing letters of one alphabet for letters from another, and Turkic languages had to use specific typewriters instead of sharing typewriters with Russian. In order to overcome these issues, a decision was made to convert Turkic languages to Cyrillic. In 1939 the Soviet government prohibited Yañalif although it remained in use until January 1940. Yañalif was also used in Nazi gazettes for prisoners of war and propaganda during World War II. The alphabet served until the 1950s, because most of the schoolbooks were printed before World War II. Some Tatar diasporas also used Yañalif outside of the Soviet Union, for example the Tatar bureau of Radio Free Europe.

For 12 years of usage the Latin script, Arabic script (and not only Yaña imlâ, but İske imlâ too) also were used. One of the Musa Cälil's Moabit Notebooks was written in Yañalif, and another was written in Arabic letters. Both notebooks were written in German prison, after 1939, the year when the Cyrillic script was established.

== Restoring Yañalif ==
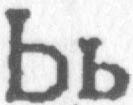
I with bowl does not have separate encoding in Unicode. Cyrillic Ь is used. Only some Tatar fonts use this glyph.

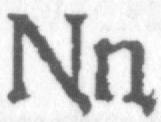
N with descender, a variant of Ŋ, that was used in Yañalif and is represented in Unicode since 6.0. Only some Tatar fonts use this glyph at the position of Ñ.

In the 1990s some wanted to restore Yañalif, or Yañalif with the addition of the letter "W", as being appropriate for the modern Tatar phonetics. But technical problems, such as font problems and the disuse of Yañalif among other peoples, forced the use of a "Turkish-based alphabet". In 2000 such an alphabet was adopted by the Tatarstan government, but in 2002 it was abolished by the Russian Federation.

=== Inalif ===
The "Internet-style" alphabet named Inalif after Internet and älifba was convented in 2003 and partly it was inspired by Yañalif. The main purpose of this alphabet was standardization of texts, which are typed on a standard English keyboard, without any diacritical marks. But this is not a simple transliteration of non-English symbols of Yañalif or modern alphabet. Sounds absent from English are represented with digraphs; soft vowels are represented as a combination of the pairmate and apostrophe, apart from [ɤ], corresponding to ⟨ь⟩ in Yañalif, which is represented as ⟨y⟩, probably under influence of transliteration of Russian. Like in Yañalif, ⟨j⟩ represent [j], and ⟨zh⟩ is used for [ʒ], corresponding to ⟨ƶ⟩ in Yañalif. ⟨x⟩ isn't used in Inalif, and ⟨kh⟩ is used instead. Other changes include: ⟨ä⟩ → ⟨a'⟩; ⟨ö⟩ → ⟨o'⟩; ⟨ü⟩ → ⟨u'⟩; ⟨ç⟩ → ⟨ch⟩; ⟨ğ⟩ → ⟨gh⟩; ⟨ñ⟩ → ⟨ng⟩; ⟨ş⟩ → ⟨sh⟩. The sorting order of Inalif isn't specified, but in practice, the English sorting order is used. Inalif is used only on the Internet.

== Criticism ==
Tatar literary scholar Khatip Minnegulov: "The replacement of the Arabic script, used by our people for more than a thousand years, with the Latin and soon the Cyrillic alphabet was a terrible blow to the continuity of the people's memory, which can be considered as burning the bridges between the past and the present".

Jussi Ahtinen-Karsikko wrote in Finland in 1934: "The change made in the footsteps of the religious indifference formed under the influence of Kemal Pasha's French spirit" felt as if "a thousand-year-old precious tradition had been frivolously sacrificed in favor of a suspicious Western progressiveness".

The Head of the Middle East and Central Asia Section at the British Library, Michael Erdman, feels that the Turkic usage of Arabic script, which dates back to the 10th century when Islam was adopted by Turkic communities, is not as unsuitable as critics claim. Erdman thinks that it is entirely possible to use the script while taking into account the unique vocal features of each languages, which a vast amount of reform efforts in the Russian Empire and later Soviet Union show. He also takes aim at the claim that Arabic script is solely connected to religion and thus backwardness by showcasing modern scientific works created in this writing. Erdman reminds that millions of Turkic people, such as the Uyghurs of China and Azeris of Iran, still use the Arabic script.

It has been argued also, that the Arabic script was more unifying for Turkic peoples; "The very limitations of the Arabic script might be considered as its strength. In essence, while the Arabic script was able to add letters to represent vowels, the obscuring of the same vowels allowed for easier comprehension between speakers with different pronunciations".

== Computer support ==
=== Unicode ===
In Unicode, it is recommended to employ the Cyrillic characters for the early Soviet Latin characters, if they have similar ones in Cyrillic. Thus, Cyrillic ⟨Ь ь⟩ and ⟨Ѣ ѣ⟩ should be used for Yañalif.

=== IETF language tags ===
The IETF language tags have registered baku1926 as a subtag for text in this notation. Note that, as of July 2026, this subtag is intended for use only with the specific prefixes az, ba, crh, kk, krc, ky, sah, tk, tt, and uz.

== See also ==
- Common Turkic Alphabet
- Tatar alphabet
- Tatar language
