= İske imlâ alphabet =

Arabic-based orthography for Tatar (c. 1870–1920)

İske imlâ
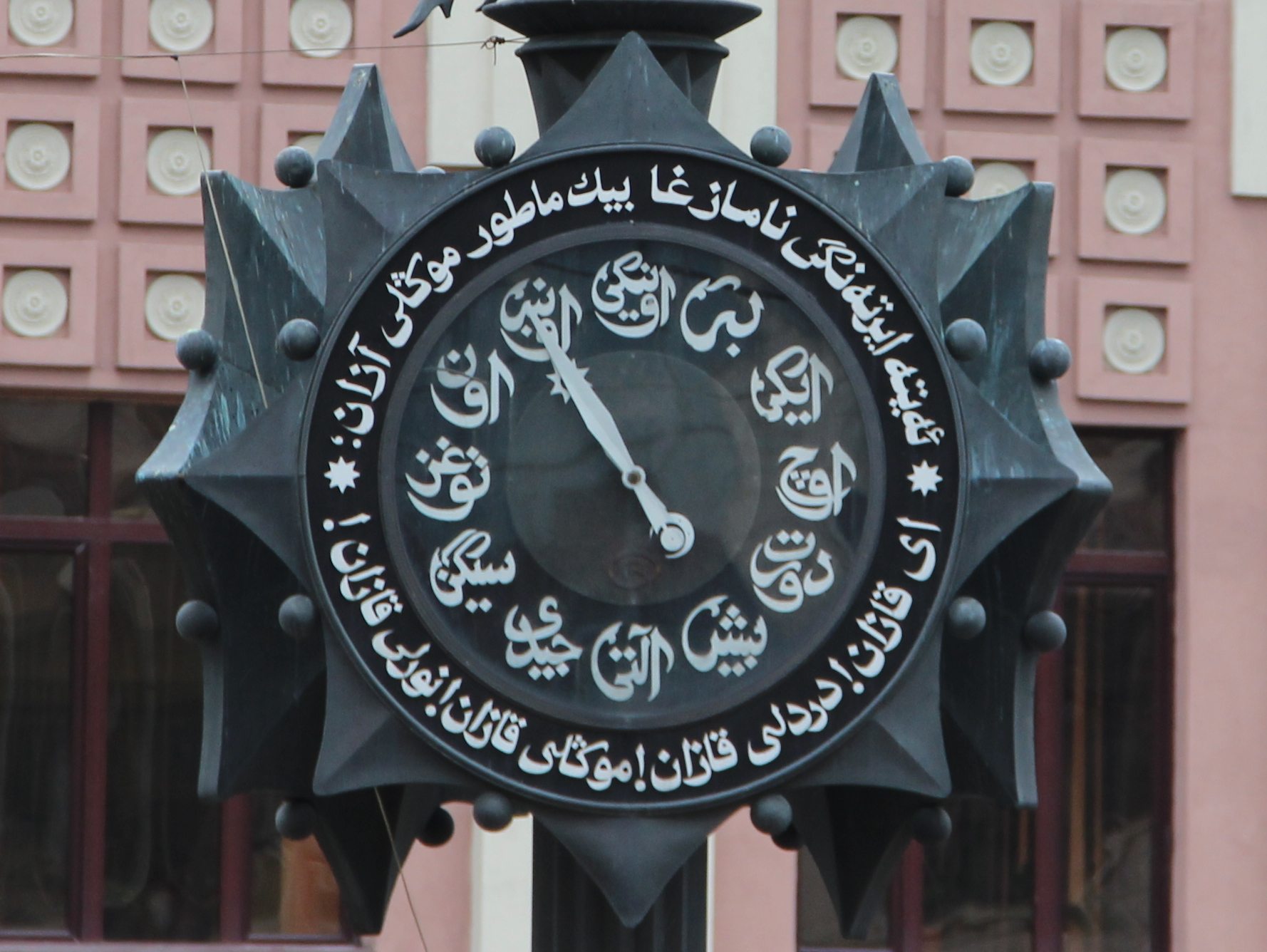
- A clock in Bauman Street, Kazan, depicting the traditional Arabic script
- Script type: Abjad
- Period: c. 1870 to 1920
- Languages: Tatar; experimental usage for Bashkir

Related scripts
- Parent systems: Phoenician: Aramaic; Nabatean; Arabic; Perso-Arabic; Chagatay; İske imlâ

İske imlâ (Tatar: иске имлә / иске имля, iske imlä / iske imlâ, ایسكی ایمله, pronounced [isˌkɘ̆‿imˈlʲæ]; lit. 'old orthography') is an Arabic-based script used for writing the Tatar language. It was the most widely used Tatar script before 1920, and was also used for the Old Tatar language (Ural-Volga Turki). İske imlâ literally means "old orthography" and was named in contrast to the Yaña imlâ script, the "new orthography" which displaced İske imlâ.

The final script was reformed by Qayum Nasiri in the 1870s. Additional characters that could not be found in Arabic and Persian were borrowed from the Chagatai language. Unlike Yaña imlâ, İske imlâ is an abjad, although the two scripts are derived from the same source.

İske imlâ is still used by Chinese Tatars, who speak an archaic variant of the Tatar language.

== Description ==
Qazan (قازان) is written in Yaña imlâ to resemble a Zilant

Cover of Tatar primer for the Russians in Arabic script from 1778. Хальфин, Сагит. Азбука татарского языка. — М., 1778. — 52 с.

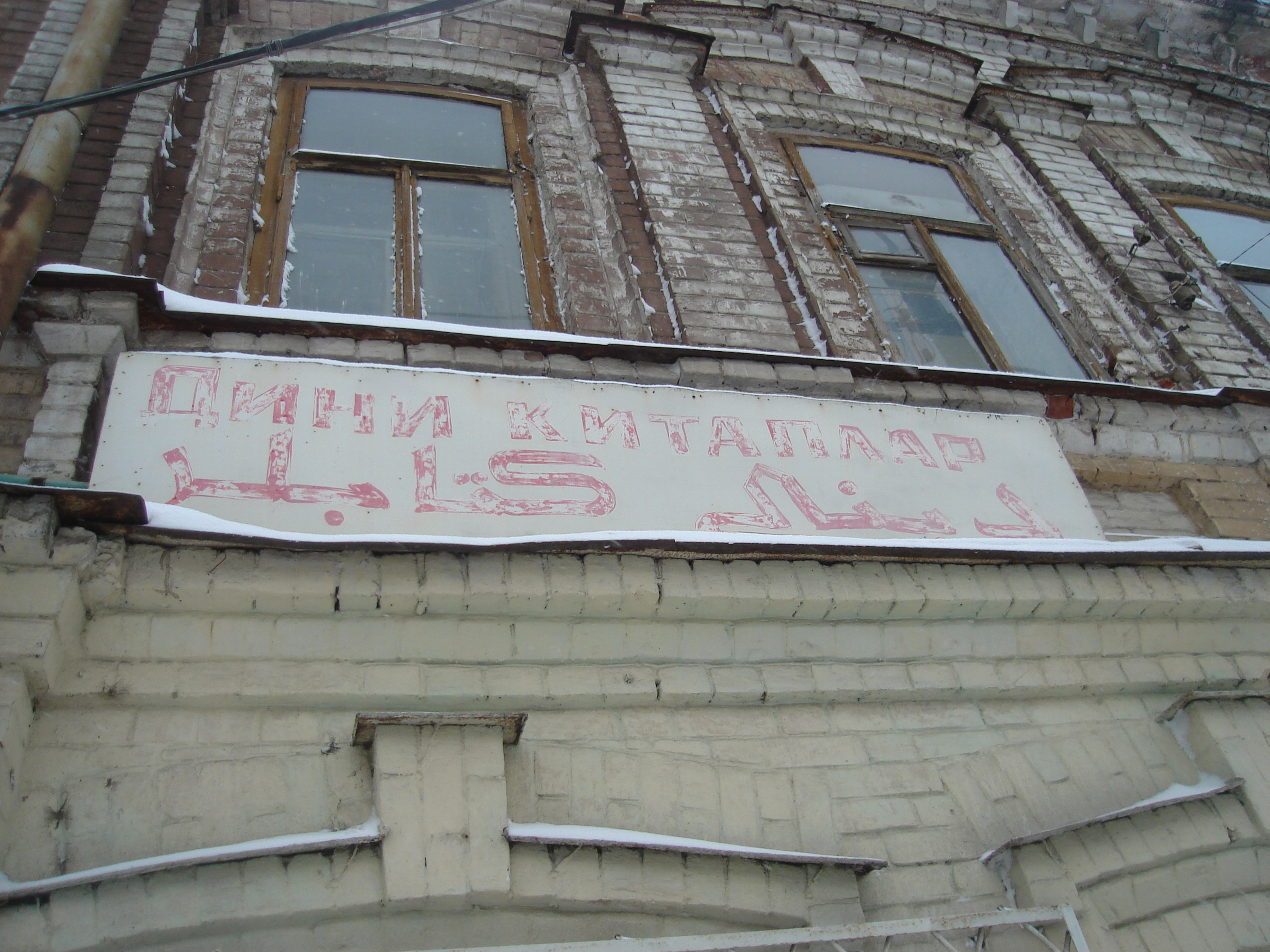
Dini kitaplar 'Religious books' written in Cyrillic (Дини китаплар) and İske imlâ (دینی كتابلر). İske imlâ is frequently used for Tatar among Muslim clergy.

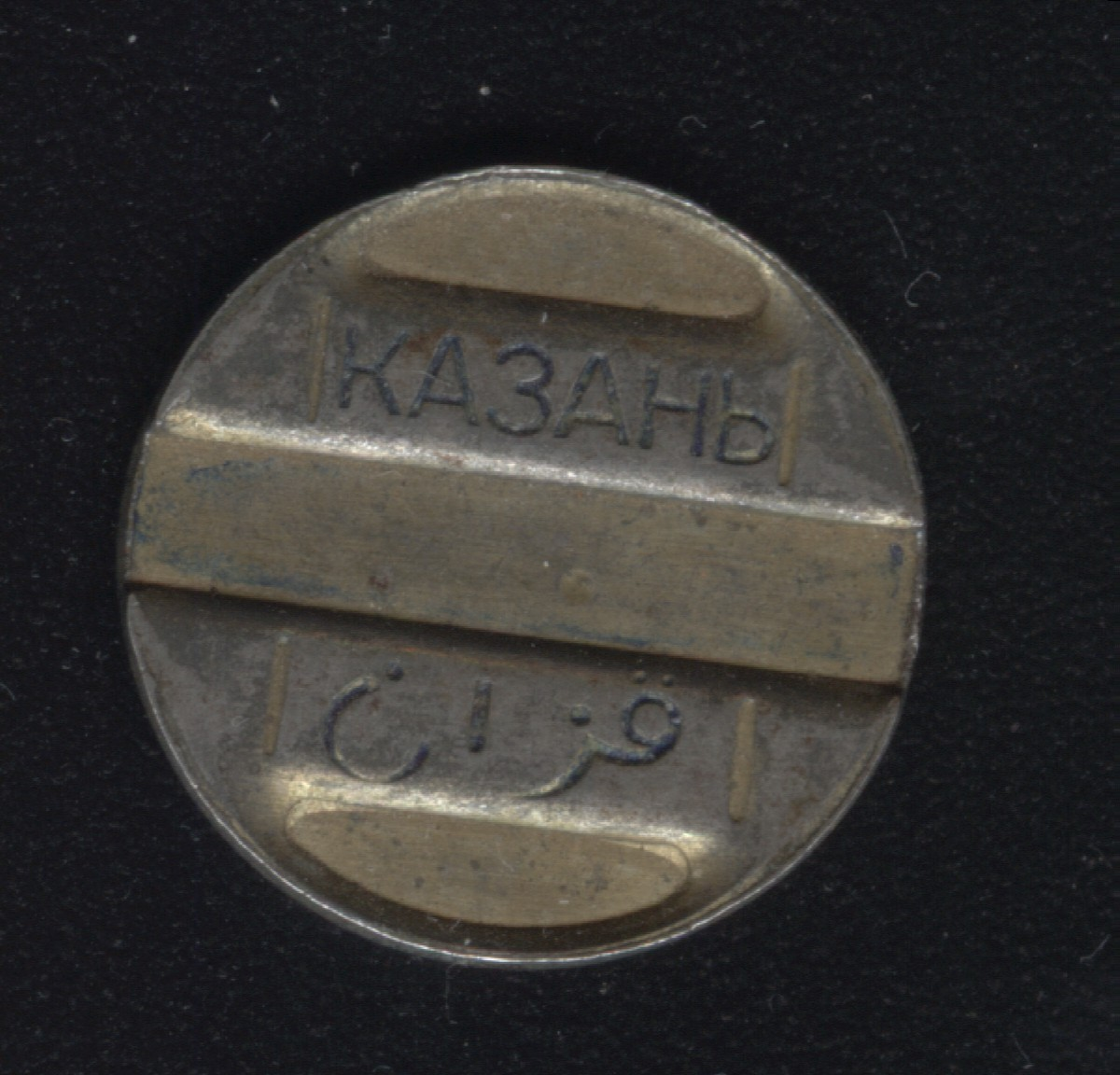
Another example of modern use of Arabic script in Tatar: telephone token, used in mid 1990s in Kazan telephone network. The word Kazan is written in Russian (Казань) and Tatar İske imlâ (قزان).

Use of the Arabic script for Tatar was linked to pan-Islamism and anti-Sovietism, with the old traditional class promoting Arabic script in opposition to the Soviets.

Based on the standard Arabic alphabet, İske imlâ reflected all vowels in the beginning and end of a word and back vowels in the middle of a word with letters, but front vowels in the middle of a word, as in most Arabic alphabets, were optionally reflected using harakat (diacritics on top of or below consonants). Just as in standard Arabic orthography, letters Alif, Yāʼ and Waw were used to represent all vowels in the beginning and end of a word and back vowels in the middle of a word, with various harakat on top or below them and in these cases the letters actually denoted a vowel. The same harakat that combined with the afore-mentioned letters to make vowels were used in the middle of a word on top of or below a consonant to represent a front vowel. However, the following pairs/triplets of Tatar vowels were represented by the same harakat, because Arabic language only uses 3 of them to represent vowels which can be either back or front depending on whether they are applied to Alif, Yāʼ and Waw or another letter (plus Alif madda represents a [ʔæː] in the beginning of a word): ı, e, í and i were represented with kasra, whereas ö and ü were represented with damma. O and U also looked the same, but being back vowels, they were represented with the help of Alif and Waw and thus were distinct from ö and ü. Fatḥah represented only one vowel. While the user had to make a conversion of writing into pronunciation, somewhat akin to English, this allowed for more similar orthography between Turkic languages, because words looked more similar even when vowels vary, such as in cases of variations like ö to ü, o to u, or e to i.

Yaña imlâ added separate letters for vowels and thus broke out with standard Arabic alphabets, but spelling followed no standard convention. During that period, the Tatar language had no borrowed vowels and consonants, so Arab loanwords were pronounced using the closest Tatar consonants (see table). European and Russian loanwords were pronounced according to how they could be written with the İske imlâ, so that, for example, "equator" was spelled "ikwatur".

== The alphabet ==
	Name	Isolated	Final	Medial	Initial	Modern Cyrillic Tatar alphabet	Modern Latin Tatar alphabet	IPA	Notes
1	әлиф älif	آ	ـا		آ	а	a	ɑ	
2	әлиф älif	ا	ـا		ا	ә	ä	æ	
3	би bi	ب	ـب	ـبـ	بـ	б	b	b	
4	пи pi	پ	ـپ	ـپـ	پـ	п	p	p	
5	ти ti	ت	ـت	ـتـ	تـ	т	t	t	
6	си si	ث	ـث	ـثـ	ثـ	с	s	s	In Bashkir language: ҫ (ś) /θ/
7	җим cim	ج	ـج	ـجـ	جـ	җ	c	ʑ	
8	чи çi	چ	ـچ	ـچـ	چـ	ч	ç	ɕ, t͡ʃ	
9	хи xi	ح	ـح	ـحـ	حـ	х	x	χ	
10	хи xi	خ	ـخ	ـخـ	خـ	х	x	χ	
11	дәл däl	د	ـد		د	д	d	d	
12	зәл zäl	ذ	ـذ		ذ	з	z	z	In Bashkir language and some dialects: ҙ (ź) /ð/
13	ра ra	ر	ـر		ر	р	r	ɾ	
14	зи zi	ز	ـز		ز	з	z	z	
15	же jé	ژ	ـژ		ژ	ж	j	ʒ	
16	син, сен sin, sen	س	ـس	ـسـ	سـ	с	s	s	
17	шин şın	ش	ـش	ـشـ	شـ	ш	ş	ʃ	
18	сад sad	ص	ـص	ـصـ	صـ	с	s	s	
19	зад zad	ض	ـض	ـضـ	ضـ	з	z	z	
20	ти tí	ط	ـط	ـطـ	طـ	т	t	t	
21	зи zí	ظ	ـظ	ـظـ	ظـ	з	z	z	
22	гәйн ğäyn	ع	ـع	ـعـ	عـ	г(ъ)	ğ	ʁ	Alternative Cyrillic transcription: ғ
23	гәйн ğäyn	غ	ـغ	ـغـ	غـ	г(ъ)	ğ	ʁ	Alternative Cyrillic transcription: ғ
24	фи fi	ف	ـف	ـفـ	فـ	ф	f	ɸ	
25	каф qaf	ق	ـق	ـقـ	قـ	к(ъ)	q	q	Alternative Cyrillic transcription: қ In Bashkir language: ҡ
26	каф kaf	ك	ـك	ـكـ	كـ	к	k	k	
27	гаф gaf	گ	ـگ	ـگـ	گـ	г	g	g	
28	эң eñ	ڭ	ـڭ	ـڭـ	ڭـ	ң	ñ	ŋ	Even though no words start with it, the initial form was used when following a non-connecting letter, such as ر, د, و
29	ләм läm	ل	ـل	ـلـ	لـ	л	l	l	
30	мим mim	م	ـم	ـمـ	مـ	м	m	m	
31	нүн nün	ن	ـن	ـنـ	نـ	н	n	n	
32	һа ha	ه	ـه	ـهـ	هـ	һ	h	h	
33	уау waw	و	ـو		و	в, у, о	w, u, o	ʊ/ʏ, o/ɵ, u	Alternative Cyrillic transcription: ў, у, о
34	вау vaw	ۋ	ـۋ		ۋ	в	v	v, w	Corresponds to в in Bashkir alphabet
35	йа ya	ی	ـی	ـیـ	یـ	й, и, ый	y, í, i	e, i	

== Sample text ==
Article 1 of the Universal Declaration of Human Rights:

İske imlâ	Yaña imlâ	Cyrillic	Latin (Zamanälif)	English translation
بارلق كشیلردە آزاد هم اوز آبرویلری هم حقوقلری یاغیندن تڭ بولوب طوەلر. آلرغە عقل هم وجدان بیرلگن هم بر-برسینە قاراتە طوغنلرچە مناسبتدە بولورغە تیوشلر.	بارلق كشىُلەر دە ئازاد ھەم ئوز ئابرویلارىُ ھەم حۇقوقلارىُ یاعننان تیڭ ࢭبولب توالار. ئالارعا ئاقل ھەم وۇجدان بیرلگەن ھەم بر-برسىُنە قاراتا توعاننارچا مۇناسەبەتتە بولرعا تییشلەر.	Барлык кешеләр дә азат һәм үз абруйлары һәм хокуклары ягыннан тиң булып туалар. Аларга акыл һәм вөҗдан бирелгән һәм бер-берсенә карата туганнарча мөнасәбәттә булырга тиешләр.	Barlıq keşelär dä azat häm üz abruyları häm xoquqları yağınnan tiñ bulıp tuwalar. Alarğa aqıl häm wöcdan birelgän häm ber-bersenä qarata tuğannarça mönasäbättä bulırğa tiyeşlär.	All human beings are born free and equal in dignity and rights. They are endowed with reason and conscience and should act towards one another in a spirit of brotherhood.
