= Yaña imlâ alphabet =

Arabic-based orthography for Tatar (1920–1927)

Yaña imlâ
- Script type: Alphabet with some elements of an abjad
- Period: 1920 to 1928
- Languages: Tatar, Bashkir

Related scripts
- Parent systems: Arabic alphabet: Persian alphabet; Chagatay alphabet; İske imlâ; Yaña imlâ

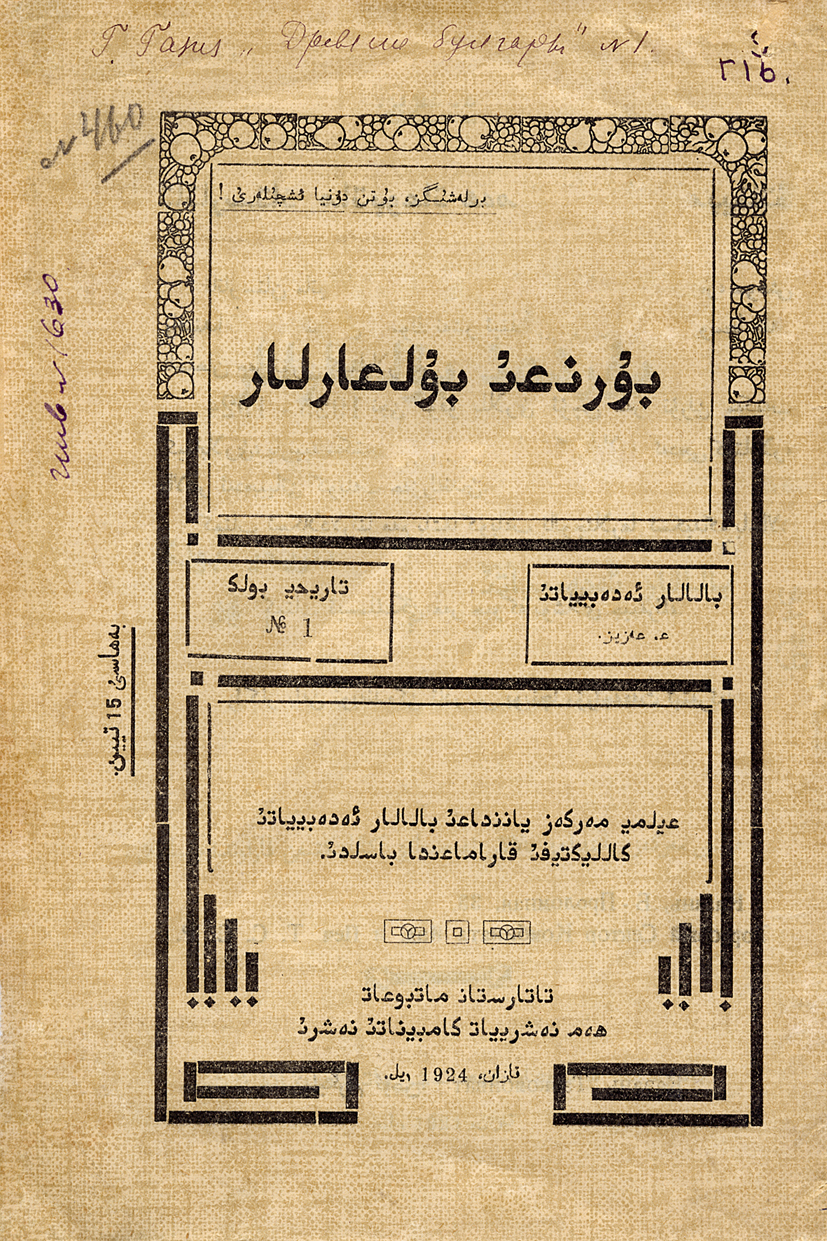
Cover page of Tatar Yana imla book, printed with Separated Arabic script in 1924

Yaña imlâ (Tatar: яңа имлә / яңа имля, yaña imlä / yaña imlâ, یاڭا ئیملە, pronounced [jʌˈŋɑ imˈlʲæ]; lit. 'new orthography') was a modified Arabic script that was in use for the Tatar language between 1920 and 1927. The orthographical reform modified İske imlâ, including abolishing homophonic letters and adding letters for short vowels e, ı, ö, o. Yaña imlâ made use of a "backness sign" ⟨ࢭ⟩ to indicate vowel harmony.

There were some projects that were to simplify Yaña imlâ too. The unique separated Arabic was invented (so as to use typewriters).

As early as in 1924 the first projects of Latin script were introduced and in 1928 the government switched to the Latin Yañalif alphabet.

== Vowels ==
10 vowels are defined. These occur in pairs, front and back vowels.

		Rounded		Unrounded		
		Close	Open	Close		Open
Back	Arabic	ࢭئو / ࢭـو	ࢭئۇ / ࢭـۇ	ࢭئیـ / ࢭیـ / ࢭی	ࢭئـ / ࢭـىُـ/ ࢭىُ	ئا / ا / ‍ـا
Back	Cyrillic (Latin)	У у (U u)	О о (O o)	Ый ый (Iy ıy)	Ы ы (I ı)	А а (A a)
Back	IPA	[u]	[o]	[ɯj]	[ɯ]	[ɑ]
Front	Arabic	ئو / ـو	ئۇ / ـۇ	ئیـ / یـ / ی	ئـ / ـىُـ/ ىُ	ئە / ـە / ە
Front	Cyrillic (Latin)	Ү ү (Ü ü)	Ө ө (Ö ö)	И и (İ i)	Э э (E e)	Ә ә (Ä ä)
Front	IPA	[y]	[œ]	[i]	[e]	[æ~a]

Similar to other Turkic languages, Tatar has vowel harmony rules. Tatar orthography has one-dimensional vowel harmony: frontness versus backness. Tatar also has vowel roundedness harmony, but it is not reflected in the orthography.

=== I / E ===
As in traditional İske imlâ, the vowel Ы ы (I ı) / Э э (E e) is not written if at the beginning or middle of a word and if the resulting consonant cluster is not ambiguous. Hence, تاتار تلىُ татар теле (tatar tle /tatar tele/) instead of تاتار تىُلىُ, برنچىُ беренче (brnçe /berençe/) instead of بىُرىُنچىُ, and ئش эш ('ş /eş/) instead of ئىُش.

=== Word-final devoicing ===
As in traditional İske imlâ, words that historically end in voiced stops keep their voiced spelling. Hence, ئازاد азат (azad /azat/) instead of ئازات and ࢭبولب булып (_{a}bülb /bulıp/) instead of ࢭبولپ.

=== Vowel harmony ===
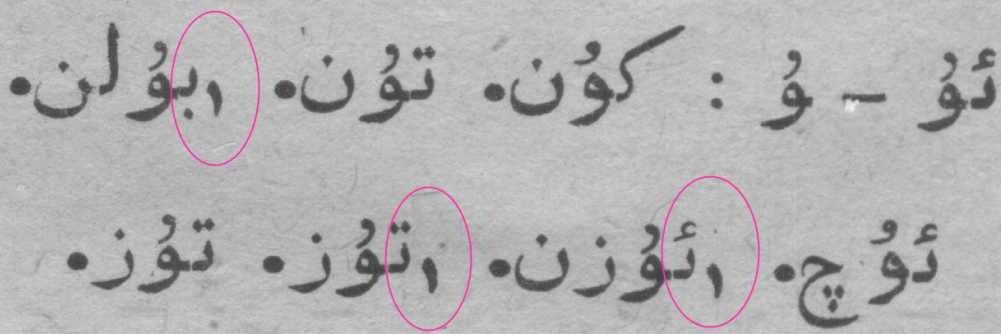
Tatar book from 1925 written in the Yaña imlâ showing use of the backness sign to designate vowel harmony

The backness sign ⟨ࢭ⟩ (Tatar: калынлык билгесе, قالنلق بیلگىُسىُ, lit. 'thickness sign', Unicode U+08AD ࢭ ARABIC LETTER LOW ALEF) has a unique role in Tatar, a role not seen in other Arabic scripts. Appearing as a modifier before a word, it indicates that the vowels in the word will be the back vowels:

- Ы ы (I ı)
- Ый ый (Iy ıy)
- О о (O o)
- У у (U u)

The backness sign ⟨ࢭ⟩ symbolizes that the vowels of the word are articulated in the same part of the mouth as an alef ⟨ا⟩ (the [ɑ] sound): at the back of the mouth.

The hamza plays a similar but inverse role in Kazakh Arabic alphabet, indicating that a word has front vowels.

There are instances where back-vowel words do not need the backness sign.

First are words that contain the vowel ئا / ا / ـا А а (A a). This vowel is a back vowel, and the corresponding front vowel ئە / ـە / ە Ә ә (Ä ä) is written with a different letter altogether. It is an unambiguous conclusion that any word containing ئا / ا / ـا А а (A a) is a back-vowel word, while a word containing ئە / ـە / ە Ә ә (Ä ä) is a front-vowel word.

For example, the word йорт (yort "house") is written with the backness sign, as ࢭیۇرت (_{a}yört), while йортлар (yortlar "houses", plural) is written as یۇرتلار (yörtlar).

The second exception is words that contain the following consonants:

- Г г (G g) (گ)
- Гъ гъ / Ғ ғ (Ğ ğ) (ع)
- К к (K k) (ك)
- Къ къ / Ҡ ҡ (Q q) (ق)

Under the rules of Tatar phonology, the consonants Г г (G g) (گ) and К к (K k) (ك) can only be accompanied by front vowels. Thus, there won't be any words containing these consonants that would need the backness sign. In contrast, the consonants Гъ гъ / Ғ ғ (Ğ ğ) (ع) and Къ къ / Ҡ ҡ (Q q) (ق) can only be accompanied by back vowels. This means that they themselves act as indicators that vowels in a word are back vowels, thus eliminating a need for the backness sign. For example, the word җылы (cılı "warm", adjective), is written as ࢭجلىُ (_{a}cle), whereas a derived word, such as җылылык (cılılıq "warmth; heat", noun), is written as جلىُلق (clelq).

Pursuant to these rules, suffixes are formed in pairs too. For example, words with back vowels take the suffixes -лык (ـلق) ~ -дык (ـدق) ~ -тык (ـتق), and words with front vowels take the suffixes -лек (ـلك) ~ -дек (ـدك) ~ -тек (ـتك).

== Letters ==
Zamanälif	Isolated	Final	Medial	Initial	Jaꞑalif	Modern Cyrillic	Notes
Aa	ئا	ـا	ا	ئا	Aa	Аа	
Ää	ئە	ـە		ئە	Әə	Әә	
Bb	ب	ـب	ـبـ	بـ	Вʙ	Бб	
Pp	پ	ـپ	ـپـ	پـ	Pp	Пп	
Tt	ت	ـت	ـتـ	تـ	Tt	Тт	
Cc	ج	ـج	ـجـ	جـ	Çç	Җҗ	
Çç	چ	ـچ	ـچـ	چـ	Cc	Чч	
Xx	ح	ـح	ـحـ	حـ	Xx	Хх	
Dd	د	ـد		د	Dd	Дд	
Rr	ر	ـر		ر	Rr	Рр	
Zz	ز	ـز		ز	Zz	Зз	
Jj	ژ	ـژ		ژ	Ƶƶ	Жж	
Ss	س	ـس	ـسـ	سـ	Ss	Сс	
Şş	ش	ـش	ـشـ	شـ	Şş	Шш	
Ğğ	ع	ـع	ـعـ	عـ	Ƣƣ	Гъ гъ	Alternative Cyrillic: Ғғ
Ff	ف	ـف	ـفـ	فـ	Ff	Фф	
Qq	ق	ـق	ـقـ	قـ	Qq	Къ къ	Alternative Cyrillic: Ққ & Ҡҡ
Kk	ك	ـك	ـكـ	كـ	Kk	Кк	
Gg	گ	ـگ	ـگـ	گـ	Gg	Гг	
Ññ	ڭ	ـڭ	ـڭـ	ڭـ	Ŋŋ	Ңң	
Ll	ل	ـل	ـلـ	لـ	Ll	Лл	
Mm	م	ـم	ـمـ	مـ	Mm	Мм	
Nn	ن	ـن	ـنـ	نـ	Nn	Нн	
Ww	و	ـو		و	Vv	Вв	Alternative Cyrillic: Ўў
Uu, Üü	ئو	ـو		ئو	Uu, Yy	Уу, Үү	ࢭئو for u ئو for Üü
Oo, Öö	ئۇ	ـۇ		ئۇ	Oo, Өɵ	Оо, Өө	ࢭئۇ for Oo ئۇ for Öö
Yy	ی	ـی	ـیـ	یـ	Jj	Йй	
Iı, Ee	ىُ	ـىُ	ـىُـ	ئىُـ	Ьь, Ee	Ыы, Ее	ࢭئـ for Iı ئـ for Ee
Iy ıy, İi	ئی	ـی	ـیـ	ئیـ	Іi, ьj	Ии, ый	ࢭئی for Iy ıy ئی for İi
Hh	ھ	ـھ	ـھـ	ھـ	Hh	Һһ	Alternative Cyrillic: Ҳҳ

== Sample text ==
Article 1 of the Universal Declaration of Human Rights:

Yaña imlâ	İske imlâ	Cyrillic	Latin (Zamanälif)	English translation
بارلق كشىُلەر دە ئازاد ھەم ئوز ئابرویلارىُ ھەم حۇقوقلارىُ یاعننان تیڭ ࢭبولب توالار. ئالارعا ئاقل ھەم وۇجدان بیرلگەن ھەم بر-برسىُنە قاراتا توعاننارچا مۇناسەبەتتە بولرعا تییشلەر.	بارلق كشیلردە آزاد هم اوز آبرویلری هم حقوقلری یاغیندن تڭ بولوب طوەلر. آلرغە عقل هم وجدان بیرلگن هم بر-برسینە قاراتە طوغنلرچە مناسبتدە بولورغە تیوشلر.	Барлык кешеләр дә азат һәм үз абруйлары һәм хокуклары ягыннан тиң булып туалар. Аларга акыл һәм вөҗдан бирелгән һәм бер-берсенә карата туганнарча мөнасәбәттә булырга тиешләр.	Barlıq keşelär dä azat häm üz abruyları häm xoquqları yağınnan tiñ bulıp tualar. Alarğa aqıl häm wöcdan birelgän häm ber-bersenä qarata tuğannarça mönasäbättä bulırğa tiyeşlär.	All human beings are born free and equal in dignity and rights. They are endowed with reason and conscience and should act towards one another in a spirit of brotherhood.

== See also ==
- Tatar alphabet
- Tatar language

== Sources ==
- "Arabic alphabet". Tatar Encyclopaedia (in Tatar). Kazan: The Republic of Tatarstan Academy of Sciences. Institution of the Tatar Encyclopaedia. 2002.
