= Languages of Kyrgyzstan =

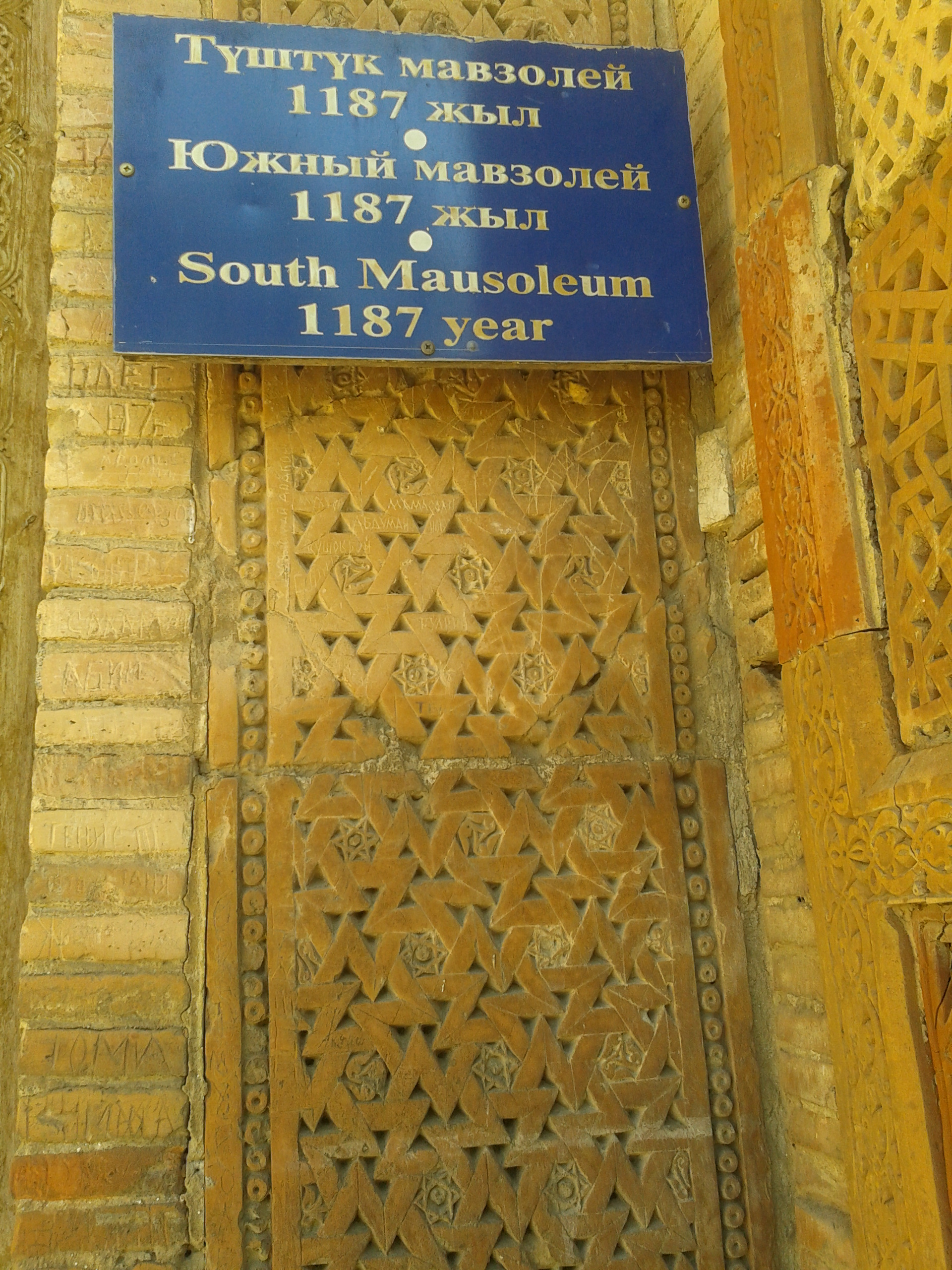
- Sign in English, Kyrgyz and Russian
- Official: Kyrgyz (national/state language); Russian (official and interethnic)
- Main: Kyrgyz
- Indigenous: Dialects of Kyrgyz language
- Minority: Dungan; Kalmyk; Koryo-mar; Tajik; Uzbek; Uyghur
- Immigrant: Turkic languages
- Foreign: Mandarin Chinese; English; French; German; Japanese; Korean
- Keyboard layout: ЙЦУКЕН
- Alphabet: Kyrgyz alphabets Kyrgyz Braille

Kyrgyzstan is one of four former Soviet republics in Central Asia to have Russian as a de jure official language. The Kyrgyz language was adopted as the official language in 1991. After pressure from the Russian and other minorities in the country, the republic adopted Russian as an official language as well in 2000, to become an officially bilingual country.

== Official languages ==
The languages of government in Kyrgyzstan are Russian as the official and inter-ethnic language and Kyrgyz as the state/national language.

Kyrgyz is a Turkic language of the Kipchak branch, closely related to Kazakh, Karakalpak, and Nogay Tatar. It was written in the Arabic alphabet until the twentieth century. Latin script was introduced and adopted in 1928, and was subsequently replaced on Stalin's orders by Cyrillic script in 1941. As a result of the pending language reform in neighboring Kazakhstan, Kyrgyzstan will be the only independent Turkic-speaking country in a few years that exclusively uses the Cyrillic script.

According to the 2009 census, 4.1 million people spoke Kyrgyz as native or second language and 2.5 million spoke Russian as native or second language, with 482,000 specifically identifying as native speakers.

Russian TV media enjoy enormous popularity in Kyrgyzstan, especially in Russian-speaking city of Bishkek and Chüy Region. Russian media outlets have an enormous impact on public opinion in Kyrgyzstan, especially in areas such as human rights and international political developments.

=== Education ===
Following the 2005 Tulip Revolution, educational reforms in 2007 required that Kyrgyz become a required subject in non-Kyrgyz-language schools, and that Russian become a required subject in schools with a language of instruction other than Russian.

== Minority languages ==
Uzbek is spoken by approximately 850 thousand residents of Kyrgyzstan and is the second most spoken native language, ahead of Russian and behind Kyrgyz.

In 2011, Almazbek Atambayev won a highly contested election marked by irregularities by the Organization for Security and Co-operation in Europe (OSEC). The Atambayev government subsequently banned graduating high school students from taking exit examinations in Uzbek, or any language other than Kyrgyz or Russian.

== Language by number of speakers ==
Language Name	Native speakers	Second-language speakers	Total speakers
Kyrgyz	3,830,556	271,187	4,121,743
Russian	482,243	2,109,393	2,591,636
Uzbek	772,561	97,753	870,314
English		28,416	28,416
French		641	641
Other	277,433	31,411	308,844

== See also ==
- Demographics of Kyrgyzstan
