= Edwin Leigh =

American educationalist (1815-1890)

- Born: September 10, 1815; South Berwick, Maine, US
- Died: April 9, 1890 (aged 74); Stoneleigh Ranch Texas, US
- Occupation: Teacher
- Title: Reverend Doctor of Medicine
- Spouse: Susan Leigh née Scollay
- Children: 9
- Awards: Medal of Progress from the Vienna Exposition of 1873

Academic background
- Education: Doctor of Medicine, Graduate of Bowdoin College, Adv. Class of Andover Theological Seminary
- Alma mater: Berwick Academy, Bowdoin College, Andover Theological Seminary, Tremont Medical School, Boston
- Influences: Isaac Pitman, Alexander John Ellis, Louis Agassiz

Academic work
- Discipline: Orthography, Pedagogy
- Main interests: Literacy
- Notable works: Pronouncing Orthography
- Notable ideas: Use of a regularised interim orthography to initially teach children literacy

Edwin Leigh (1815–1890) was an American educationalist who invented Pronouncing Orthography to improve literacy and elocution in American children in the late 19th century. The new orthography was widely adopted in the United States, with most basal reading schemes publishing versions for use with phonetic teaching methods. Education journals, governing bodies of public schools and teacher surveys reported that children learned to read 6–12 months faster with improved elocution, spelling and logical thinking in subjects like arithmetic. Leigh won the Medal of Progress at the Vienna Exposition of 1873 for his invention of Pronouncing Orthography.

As well as pedagogy, Leigh had an eclectic set of interests throughout his life and contributed to progress in fields such as theology, the philosophy of science, medicine and the abolition of slavery.

== Early life ==
On September 10, 1815, Leigh was born in South Berwick, Maine, in the United States. He was the son of Major Thomas Leigh and Nancy Leigh née Baker. His father was a veteran of the War of 1812 and owned and operated the Saw Mills at Quamphegan Landing, which became known as Leigh's Mills. Edwin Leigh had five siblings and was related to the wealthy Chadbourne family through his paternal grandmother, Martha Leigh; the Chadbourne family founded Berwick College, which Edwin Leigh would later attend.

== Personal life ==
On April 10, 1839, Edwin Leigh married Susan Scollay of Ashburnham, Massachusetts, and they had nine children, with three dying early and five recorded:

- Anna Eliza "Lizzie" Slattery née Leigh (1842–1915)
- Elizabeth Wyman née Leigh (1851–1889)
- Edward Baker Leigh (1853–1932)
- George Leonard Leigh (1855–1901)
- Herbert Leigh (1861–1927)

Notably, Leigh initially experimented with teaching literacy using an interim orthography by teaching his eldest daughter Anna to read using Fonotypy in 1946 when she was 4 – 5 years old. This early experience persuaded Leigh of the need for a straightforward teaching orthography, which he invented after two decades of development, called Pronouncing Orthography.

Leigh would eventually retire to Stoneleigh Ranch, in Kerr County, Texas, owned by his son, Edward Baker Leigh, where he died on April 9, 1890.

== Education ==
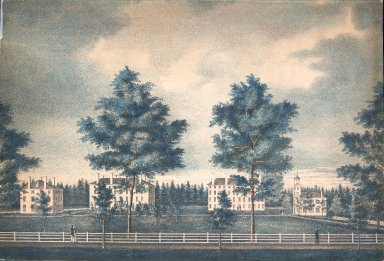
Bowdoin College in the 1830s

Leigh was a school pupil at the Berwick Academy preparatory school in Berwick, Maine, founded by his Chadbourne relatives. He subsequently studied at Bowdoin College in Brunswick, Maine, between 1832 and 1835, when he graduated. Apart from the school of medicine, Bowdoin College had a single general course of study for their degree, including the study of classics, history, mathematics, grammar, rhetoric etc. Later Leigh would go on to study theology and medicine.

== Theology ==
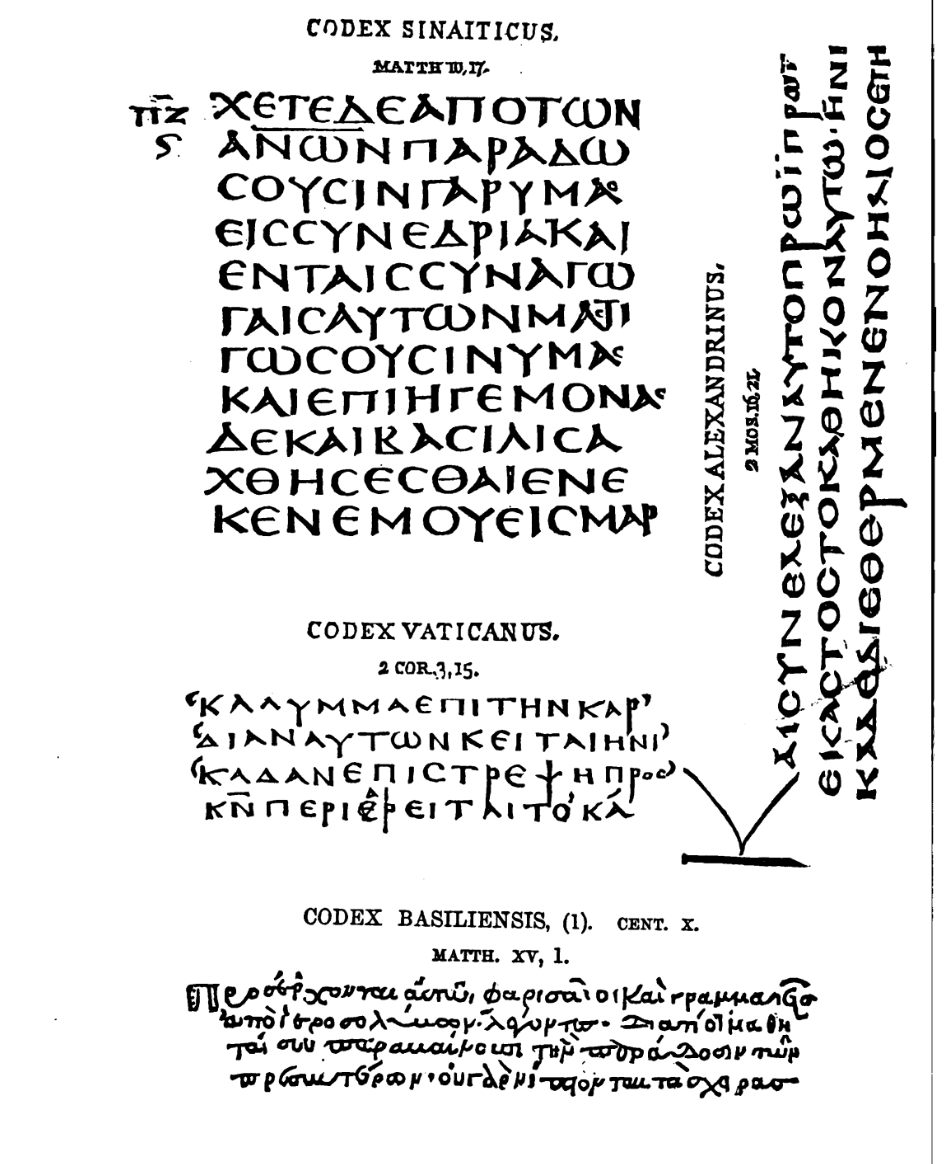
Inside cover of The Sinai and Comparative New Testament by Dr Edwin Leigh

Edwin Leigh initially had the zeal to become a Christian missionary, so after graduating from Bowdoin, he entered Andover Theological Seminary where he graduated in 1838–39. He obtained an appointment from the American Board of Commissioners for Foreign Missions to proselytise in Asia Minor. Unfortunately, his wife's health forced Leigh to change his mind and seek a position within the priesthood instead. After acting as "stated supply" in the congregations of Kennebunk, Maine (1839–1840) and Winchendon, Massachusetts (1841–1842), he was eventually ordained pastor over a Congregational church in Woonsocket (Smithfield), Rhode Island on August 2, 1843. Still, Leigh became dissatisfied after attaining his desired position, so the following year, he requested to be dismissed, which was granted on May 22, 1844.

Leigh spent nearly a decade studying theology and practising in the priesthood. Later in his life, he would use these ecclesiastical foundations to transliterate the gospels according to Luke and Mark into Pronouncing Orthography so they could be used to teach both literacy and Christianity.

Leigh's most important theological work was to come later when in 1881, he published The Sinai and Comparative New Testament, an English translation of Codex Sinaiticus with an in-line comparison to the King James Version of the Bible, the Codex Vaticanus and the Codex Alexandrinus. Although, at heart, it was a simple re-arrangement of the Constantin von Tischendorf Testament, Leigh's document allowed theologians to easily compare three of the great uncial codices and the authorised version of the bible.

== Medicine ==
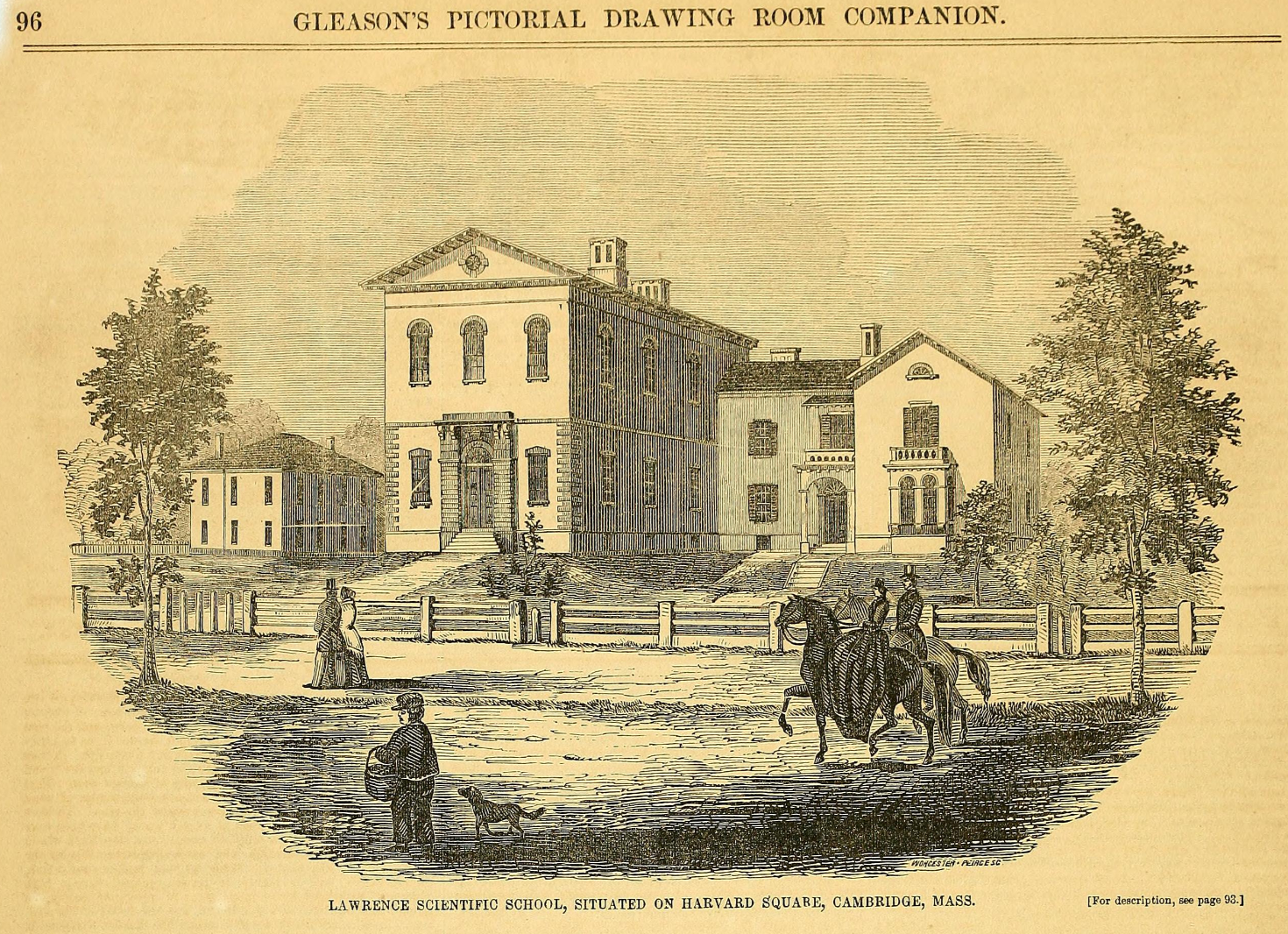
Lawrence Scientific School Harvard in 1851 when Dr Leigh served as a Natural History lecturer.

In 1847, Leigh turned to study medicine at the Tremont Medical School, Boston, which was linked to Harvard Medical School, where Leigh studied under the tutelage of Dr Jacob Bigelow. During this time, Leigh published a controversial paper on the philosophy of medical science, considered with special reference to Dr Elisha Bartlett's "Essay on the Philosophy of Medical Science". Although this essay won the Boylston Prize, it was criticised.

After graduating from Harvard in 1850, Leigh remained and took a position as an assistant to Professor Louis Agassiz, lecturing students in natural history (1850–1851).

Leigh then used his newly acquired knowledge to practise medicine as a physician in Somerville, Massachusetts and Townsend, Massachusetts between 1851 and 1854 before again becoming dissatisfied and reverting to his true vocation of teaching.

== Teaching ==
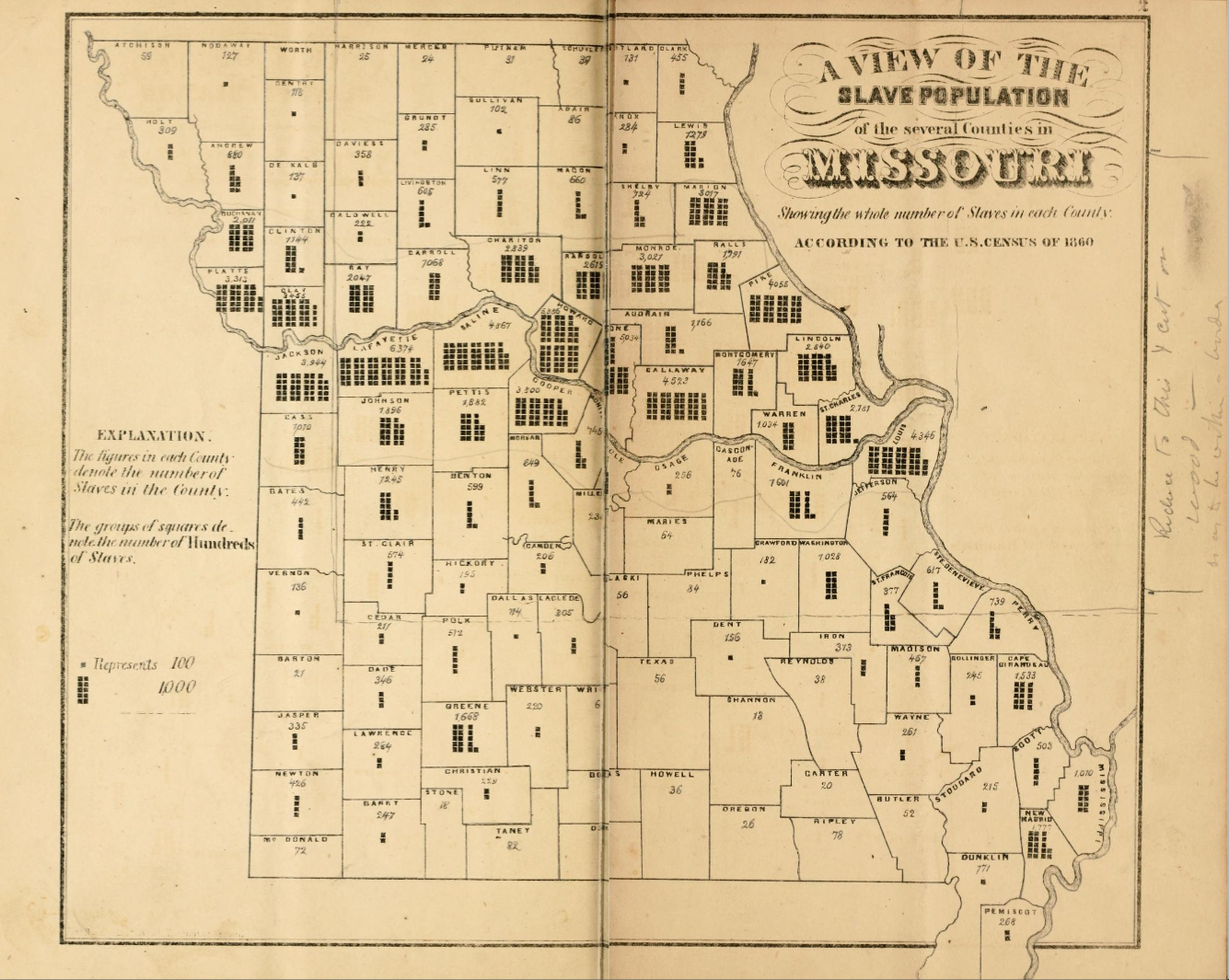
Bird's Eye View of Slavery in Missouri 1862 by Dr Edwin Leigh

Between 1844 and 1846, Leigh spent two years employed as a teacher in Bristol, Rhode Island⠀in the gap between leaving the clergy and starting to study medicine. After quitting his medical career in 1854, Leigh returned to teaching by moving to St. Louis, Missouri, where he took up a post as a teacher of natural history in the High School and the Principle of its Evening School. Leigh also became associated with a department in the city's University and produced several key reports, such as the Bird's eye view of Slavery in Missouri (1862), which was published amid the American Civil War and provided the demographic view to enable the emancipation of slavery in Missouri.

== Orthography ==
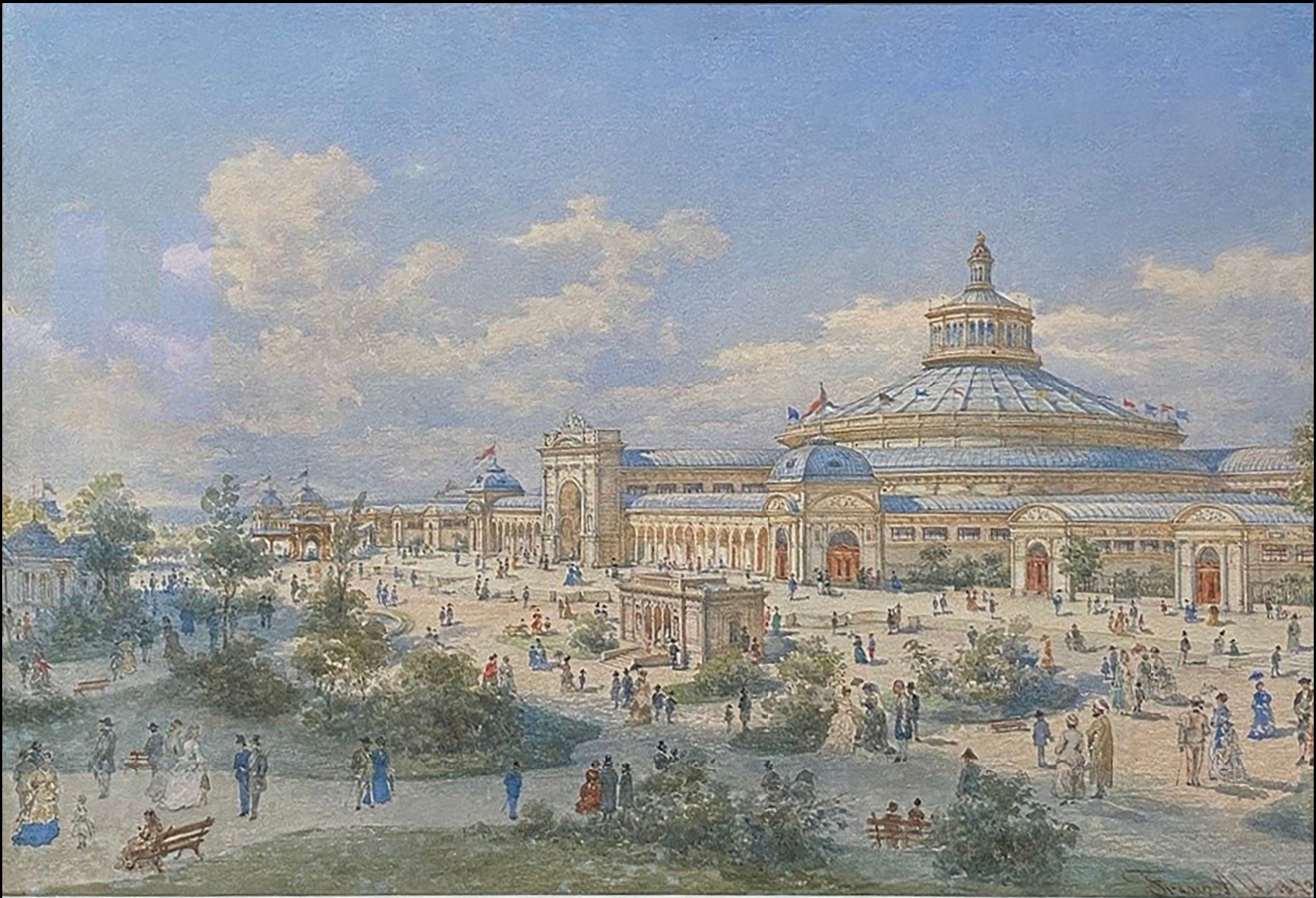
Vienna Exposition of 1873 by Franz Alt when Dr Leigh won the Medal of Progress for Pronouncing Orthography

From the moment Fonotypy was published as an exemplar of an alternative English orthography in 1844, Leigh both studied its design and then trialled its use as an interim teaching orthography. Leigh became convinced of the efficacy of the phonetic method and the need for a more straightforward orthography with the sole objective of teaching literacy. He commenced two decades of work to design Pronouncing Orthography, which was launched in 1864 and then trialled successfully in St Louis, Missouri, where he worked as a teacher.

Leigh then spent the next two decades promoting Pronouncing Orthography, which achieved a fair degree of success as it spread across the United States and was adopted by all the major basal reading schemes of the time. Articles in education journals, surveys of teachers and reports in the public school records all testified to its success in improving reading, elocution, spelling and logical thinking so children also became better at subjects like arithmetic.

The remarkable nature of Leigh's invention was recognised at the Vienna Exposition of 1873, where Dr Edwin Leigh was awarded the Medal of Progress for the merit of his invention of Pronouncing Orthography.

== Publications ==
Apart from the large number of publications associated with pronouncing orthography, Leigh produced the following noteworthy works: –

- 1849 - Philosophy of Medical Science (Boylston Prize Essay) (pp. 23)
- 1850 - Respiration subservient to Nutrition (Thesis) (pp. 20)
- 1863 - Bird's eye view of slavery in Missouri (pp. 3)
- 1881 - The Sinai and Comparative New Testament (pp. 153)
