= Kyrgyz alphabets =

Alphabets used to write the Kyrgyz language

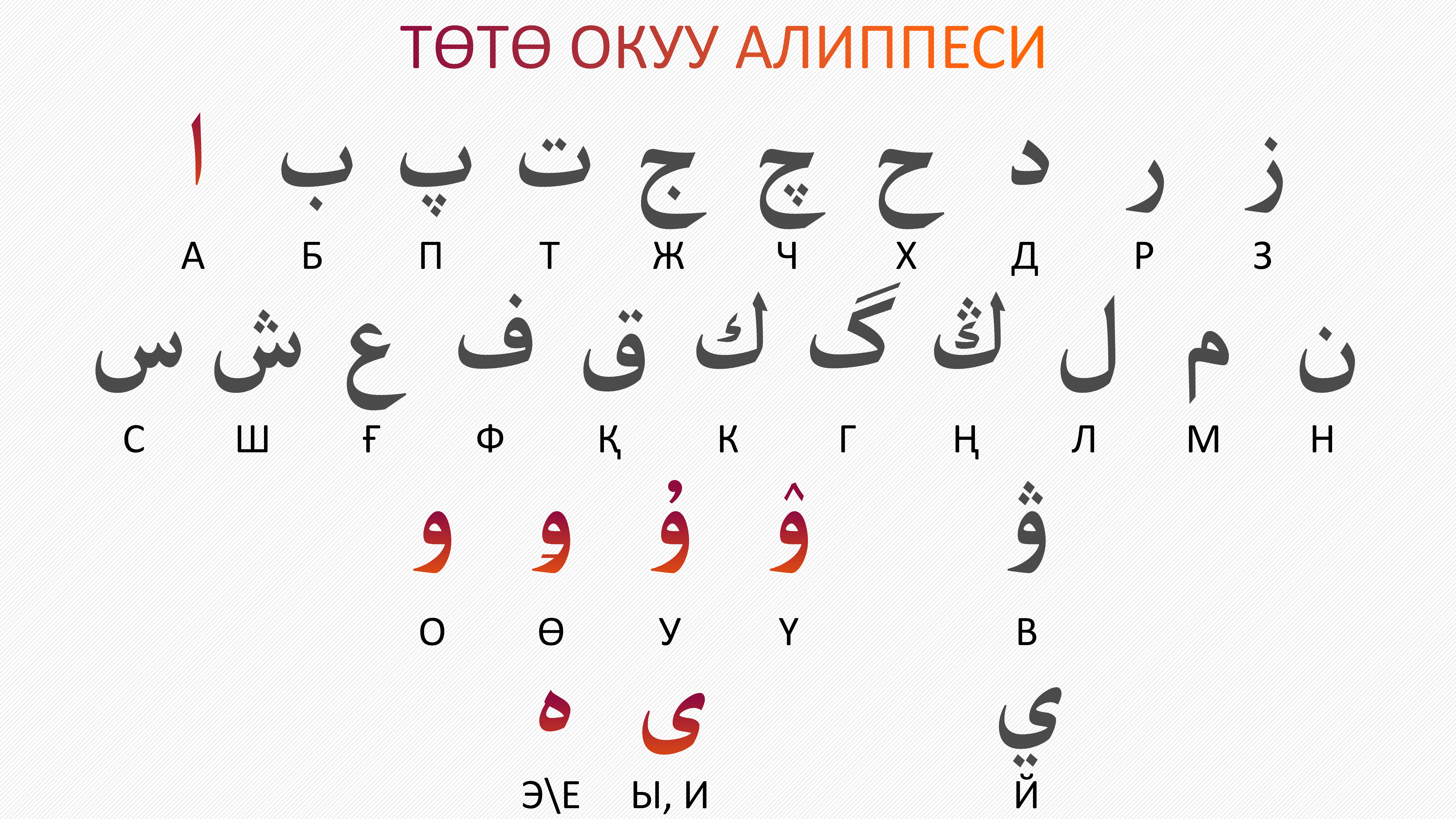
Kyrgyz Arabic Script as developed by the founder of the Kyrgyz linguistics, Qasym Tynystanov.

The Kyrgyz alphabets (Note: Kyrgyz: Кыргыз алфавити, romanized: Kyrgyz alfaviti, قىرعىز الفاۋئتى, Yañalif: Qьrƣьz alfaviti, pronounced [qɯrˈɢɯz ɐɫfɐˈvʲitɪ]) are the alphabets used to write the Kyrgyz language. Kyrgyz uses the following alphabets:

- The Cyrillic script is officially used in the Kyrgyz Republic (Kyrgyzstan)
- The Perso-Arabic script is officially used in Afghanistan, Pakistan and the People's Republic of China (China) in the Kizilsu Kyrgyz Autonomous Prefecture, the Ili Kazakh Autonomous Prefecture of the Xinjiang Uyghur Autonomous Region.
- Kyrgyz Braille

The Perso-Arabic script was traditionally used to write Kyrgyz before the introduction of the first Latin-based alphabets in 1927. In the years 1923 to 1925, Kyrgyz literaturists and linguists such as Kasym Tynystanov and Ishenali Arabayev undertook a project of reforming Kyrgyz Arabic orthography. In doing so, they took inspiration from the reformed Kazakh Arabic alphabet, one of the first Turkic Arabic scripts to be undergoing reforms as early as 1912. Today an Arabic alphabet is used in China, which slightly differs from the 1920s Soviet standard. For example, in the 1920s Arabic alphabet, the distinction between front and back vowel pairs [о][ɵ] and [u][ʏ] was to be marked with an initial hamza if it couldn't be inferred from the word itself. In the Chinese variant standardized in 1950s, each of the said four vowels have a unique letter for example, thus making the use of a hamza unnecessary.

1940 Soviet loan bond. The Kyrgyz title uses the Latin alphabet in the last line of the right-hand language column.

The New Turkic Alphabet was used in the USSR in the 1930s until its replacement by a Cyrillic script. The Kyrgyz Cyrillic alphabet is the alphabet used in Kyrgyzstan. It contains 36 letters: 33 from the Russian alphabet with 3 additional letters for sounds of the Kyrgyz language: Ң, Ү, Ө.

Within the country, there have been mixed reactions to the idea of adopting the Latin alphabet for Kyrgyz. The chairman of Kyrgyzstan's National Commission for the State Language and Language Policies, Kanybek Osmonaliev, announced in September 2022 that it is considering switching to the Latin alphabet. However, several months later, Russia suspended dairy exports to Kyrgyzstan after Osmonaliev repeated his proposal to change the official script from Cyrillic to Latin to bring the country in line with other Turkic-speaking nations. Osmonaliev was reprimanded by President Sadyr Japarov who then clarified that Kyrgyzstan had no plans to replace the Cyrillic alphabet.

== Vowels ==
In the Kyrgyz Cyrillic alphabet, there are 15 vowels, and in Kyrgyz Arabic Alphabet, there are 13. The discrepancy is for two reasons. First, in Kyrgyz Cyrillic, both vowels Э э and Е е were imported from the Russian Cyrillic alphabet. They essentially make the same sound, and the choice comes down to a matter of orthographic rule. They are both represented in the Kyrgyz Arabic alphabet with ە / ﻪ. The second difference is that Kyrgyz Cyrillic has two letters Ы ы and И и, the former being a back vowel and the latter a front vowel.

Similar to other Turkic languages, Kyrgyz vowels are divided into front vowel and back vowel, and all words shall follow the vowel harmony rules. This means that the vowel sounds within a word can either be front vowel, or back vowel.

In Kyrgyz, vowels are also divided into short and long. Whether in Kyrgyz Cyrillic Alphabet, or in Kyrgyz Arabic Alphabet, long vowels are represented by writing the same letter twice. For example, in the word дөөлөт / دۅۅلۅت 'state', there is a long vowel and a short vowel. Of the two letters Э э and Е е, only the former also has a long vowel, Ээ ээ

The letters Ы ы and И и do not have a long vowel equivalent.

| | | Rounded | | | | Unrounded | | | | |
| | | Close | | Open | | Close | | | Open | |
| | | Short | Long | Short | Long | N/A | Short | Long | Short | Long |
|---|---|---|---|---|---|---|---|---|---|---|
| Back Жоон үндүүлөр جوون ۉندۉۉلۅر | Arabic | ـﯗ / ﯗ | ـﯗﯗ / ﯗﯗ | ـو / و | ـوو / وو | ىـ / ـى / ى | | | ا / ‍ـا | اا / ‍ـاا |
| Back Жоон үндүүлөр جوون ۉندۉۉلۅر | Cyrillic (Latin) | У у (U u) | Уу уу (Uu uu) | О о (O o) | Оо оо (Oo oo) | Ы ы (Y y) | | | А а (A a) | Аа аа (Aa aa) |
| Back Жоон үндүүлөр جوون ۉندۉۉلۅر | IPA | [ʊ] | [uː] | [ɔ] | [ɔː] | [ɯ] | | | [ɑ] | [ɑː] |
| Front Ичке үндүүлөр ىچكە ۉندۉۉلۅر | Arabic | ـۉ / ۉ | ـۉۉ / ۉۉ | ـۅ / ۅ | ـۅۅ / ۅۅ | ىـ / ـى / ى (ئـ / ـئ / ئ)^{1} | ە / ـە | ەە / ـەە | | |
| Front Ичке үндүүлөр ىچكە ۉندۉۉلۅر | Cyrillic (Latin) | Ү ү (Ü ü) | Үү үү (Üü üü) | Ө ө (Ö ö) | Өө өө (Öö öö) | И и (I i) | Е е / Э э (E e) | Ээ ээ (Ee ee) | | |
| Front Ичке үндүүлөр ىچكە ۉندۉۉلۅر | IPA | [ʏ] | [yː] | [ɵ] | [ɵː] | [ɪ] | [e] | [eː] | | |

Notes

1. The common and standard letter for use the vowel pair [Ы ы][И и] (back vowel and front vowel respectively) in Arabic is the letter "ىـ / ـى / ى". When it cannot be inferred from the word which of these two the letter is referring to, if the vowel is front vowel, a hamza is placed on the letter. If there exists multiple front vowels [И и] in a word, where in Arabic, the hamza is necessary for the correct inference of the pronunciation, only the initial letter is to take hamza.
  What is meant by inference, is that the consonants "قـ ق" and "عـ ع" ([q] and [ɢ~ʁ]) are only used with back vowels, and the letters "كـ ك" and "گـ‌ گ" ([k] and [g]) with front vowels. Each of the other vowels in a word are also clearly either front or back vowels. So based on vowel harmony rules, it can be inferred that an unmarked "ىـ / ـى / ى" letter is also either back or front vowel, matching the word. However, there exists words in Kyrgyz, where in a word that contains back-vowels, there exists mid-word an exceptional use of the front vowel [И и]. In these cases as well, the hamza is to be used to mark the vowel. Below a variety of examples, and their Cyrillic transliterations:
  - سىر сыр ('secret')
  - انىن سىرى (анын сыры) ('his secret')
  - بئر бир ('one')
  - بئرى бири ('one of')
  - ابئيىر абийир ('conscience')
  - كىردىم кирдим ('I entered')
  - قىردىم кырдым ('I shaved')
  - دئيالەكت диалект ('dialect')

== Correspondence chart ==
Correspondence chart of four Kyrgyz alphabets: the Kyrgyz Cyrillic and Kyrgyz Braille alphabets used in Kyrgyzstan, the Kyrgyz Latin alphabet used from 1928 to 1938 in the Kirghiz Soviet Socialist Republic, and the Kyrgyz Arabic alphabet used in Afghanistan, Pakistan and in Xinjiang, China. In this correspondence chart, the Cyrillic alphabet is written in its official order. The Perso-Arabic and Latin equivalents are not written in their official alphabetical orders but have been listed around the Cyrillic for ease of understanding.

Comparison of Kyrgyz alphabets
| Cyrillic | Name | Braille | Arabic | Transliteration (BGN/PCGN) | Latin (1928–1938) | IPA transcription |
|---|---|---|---|---|---|---|
| А а | а (a) | ⠁ | ا | A a | A a | /ɑ~a/ |
| Б б | бе (be) | ⠃ | ب | B b | B ʙ | /b~w/ |
| В в | ве (we) | ⠺ | ۋ | V v | V v | /w~v/ |
| Г г | ге (ge) | ⠛ | گ ع* | G g | G g, Ƣ ƣ | /ɡ, ʁ~ɢ/ |
| Д д | де (de) | ⠙ | د | D d | D d | /d/ |
| Е е | е (ye) | ⠑ | ە | E e | E e | /je, e/ |
| Ё ё | ё (yo) | ⠡ | ي+و(يو) | Yo yo | Jo jo | /jɵ~jo/ |
| Ж ж | же (je) | ⠚ | ج | J j | Cc (Ƶ ƶ from 1938) | /d͡ʑ/, both /d͡ʑ/ and /ʑ/ since 1938 |
| З з | зе (ze) | ⠵ | ز | Z z | Z z | /z/ |
| И и | и (i) | ⠊ | ى (ئ) | I i | I i | /i~ɪ/ |
| Й й | ий (ii) | ⠯ | ي | Y y | J j | /j/ |
| К к | ка (ka) | ⠅ | ك ق* | K k | K k, Q q | /k, q~χ/ |
| Л л | эл (el) | ⠇ | ل | L l | L l | /l, ɫ/ |
| М м | эм (em) | ⠍ | م | M m | M m | /m/ |
| Н н | эн (en) | ⠝ | ن | N n | N n | /n/ |
| Ң ң | ың (yng) | ⠽ | ڭ | Ng ng | Ꞑ ꞑ | /ŋ~ɴ/ |
| О о | о (o) | ⠕ | و | O o | O o | /o~ɔ/ |
| Ө ө | ө (ö) | ⠌ | ۅ | Ö ö | Ɵ ɵ | /ɵ/ |
| П п | пе (pe) | ⠏ | پ | P p | P p | /p/ |
| Р р | эр (er) | ⠗ | ر | R r | R r | /r~ɾ/ |
| С с | эс (es) | ⠎ | س | S s | S s | /s/ |
| Т т | те (te) | ⠞ | ت | T t | T t | /t/ |
| У у | у (u) | ⠥ | ۇ | U u | U u | /u~ʊ/ |
| Ү ү | ү (ü) | ⠧ | ۉ | Ü ü | Y y | /y~ʏ/ |
| Ф ф | эф (ef) | ⠋ | ف | F f | F f | /ɸ~f/ |
| Х х | ха (ha) | ⠓ | ح | Kh kh | H h | /χ/ |
| Ц ц | це (ce) | ⠉ | (ت+س (تس | Ts ts | Ts ts | /t͡s/ |
| Ч ч | че (che) | ⠟ | چ | Ch ch | Ç ç | /t͡ɕ/ |
| Ш ш | ша (sha) | ⠱ | ش | Sh sh | Ş ş | /ɕ/ |
| Щ щ | ща (shcha) | ⠭ | - | Shch shch | ŞÇ şç | /ɕː/ |
| Ъ ъ | ажыратуу белгиси (ajyratuu belgisi) | ⠷ | - | " | - | * |
| Ы ы | ы (y) | ⠮ | ى | Y y | Ь ь | /ɯ~ɤ/ |
| Ь ь | ичкертүү белгиси (ichkertüü belgisi) | ⠾ | - | ' | - | * |
| Э э | э (e) | ⠪ | ە | E e | E e | /e/ |
| Ю ю | ю (yu) | ⠳ | ي+ۇ(يۇ) | Yu yu | Ju ju | /ju~jʊ, jy~jʏ/ |
| Я я | я (ya) | ⠫ | ي+ا(يا) | Ya ya | Ja ja | /jɑ~ja/ |

- К к and Г г correspond respectively with ق and ع in back-vowel words; and in front-vowel words with ك and گ.

== Text sample ==
Article 1 of the Universal Declaration of Human Rights:

| Cyrillic alphabet | Perso-Arabic script | International Phonetic Alphabet |
|---|---|---|
| Бардык адамдар өз беделинде жана укуктарында эркин жана тең укуктуу болуп жаралат. Алардын аң-сезими менен абийири бар жана бири-бирине бир туугандык мамиле кылууга тийиш. | باردىق ادامدار ۅز بەدەلىندە جانا ۇقۇقتارىندا ەركىن جانا تەڭ ۇقۇقتۇۇ بولۇپ جارالات. الاردىن اڭ-سەزىمى مەنەن ابئيىرى بار جانا بئرى-بىرىنە بئر تۇۇعاندىق مامئلە قىلۇۇعا تئيىش. | [bɑ(ː)ɾˈdɯq ɑdɑmˈdɑɾ øz bedelinˈde d͡ʒɑˈnɑ uquqtɑɾɯnˈdɑ eɾˈkin d͡ʒɑˈnɑ teŋ uquqˈtuː boɫup d͡ʒɑɾɑˈɫɑt ‖ ɑɫɑɾˈdɯn ɑɴ‿seziˈmi meˈnen ɑβijiˈɾi bɑɾ d͡ʒɑˈnɑ biɾi‿βiɾiˈne biɾ tuːʁɑnˈdɯq mamɪ̆ˈle qɯɫuːˈʁɑ tiˈjiɕ ‖] |
| Common Turkic Alphabet | Old Latin alphabet | English translation |
| Bardıq adamdar öz bedelinde cana uquqtarında erkin cana teñ uquqtuu bolup caralat. Alardın añ-sezimi menen abiyiri bar cana biri-birine bir tuuğandıq mamile qıluuğa tiyiş. | Bardьq adamdar ɵz ʙedelinde çana uquqtarьnda erkin çana teꞑ uquqtuu ʙolup çaralat. Alardьn aꞑ-sezimi menen aʙijiri ʙar çana ʙiri-ʙirine ʙir tuuƣandьq mamile qьluuƣa tijiş. | All human beings are born free and equal in dignity and rights. They are endowed with reason and conscience and should act towards one another in a spirit of brotherhood. |

== Arabic script ==
The table below illustrates the letter order for Kyrgyz as the letter order differs based on whether it's being written in Perso-Arabic, Cyrillic or Latin.

| Transliteration | | Letter name | IPA | Isolated | Final | Medial | Initial |
| Cyrillic | Latin | Letter name | IPA | Isolated | Final | Medial | Initial |
|---|---|---|---|---|---|---|---|
| А а | A a | Алиф | [ɑ] | ا | ﺎ | | ا |
| Б б | B b | Бе | [b] | ﺏ | ﺐ | ﺒ | ﺑ |
| П п | P p | Пе | [p] | پ | ﭗ | ﭙ | ﭙ |
| Т т | T t | Те | [t] | ﺕ | ﺖ | ﺘ | ﺗ |
| Ж ж | J j | Жим | [d͡ʑ] | ﺝ | ﺞ | ﺠ | ﺟ |
| Ч ч | Ch ch | Чим | [t͡ɕ] | ﭺ | ﭻ | ﭽ | ﭼ |
| Х х | H h | Хе | [χ~q] | ﺡ | ﺢ | ﺤ | ﺣ |
| Д д | D d | Дал | [d] | ﺩ | ﺪ | | ﺩ |
| Р р | R r | Ре | [r~ɾ] | ﺭ | ﺮ | | ﺭ |
| З з | Z z | Зайн | [z] | ﺯ | ﺰ | | ﺯ |
| С с | S s | Син | [s] | ﺱ | ﺲ | ﺴ | ﺳ |
| Ш ш | Sh sh | Шин | [ɕ] | ﺵ | ﺶ | ﺸ | ﺷ |
| Г г | G g | Гайн | [ɢ~ʁ] | ﻉ | ﻊ | ﻌ | ﻋ |
| Ф ф | F f | Фе | [ɸ~f] | ﻑ | ﻒ | ﻔ | ﻓ |
| К к | K k | Каф | [q] | ﻕ | ﻖ | ﻘ | ﻗ |
| К к | K k | Kе | [k] | ك | ـك | ـكـ | كـ |
| Г г | G g | Ге | [ɡ] | گ | ﮓ | ﮕ | ﮔ |
| Ң ң | Ng ng | Эң | [ŋ~ɴ] | ڭ | ـڭ | ـڭـ | ڭـ |
| Л л | L l | Лам | [l~ɫ] | ﻝ | ﻞ | ﻠ | ﻟ |
| М м | M m | Mим | [m] | ﻡ | ﻢ | ﻤ | ﻣ |
| Н н | N n | Нун | [n] | ﻥ | ﻦ | ﻨ | ﻧ |
| О о | O o | O o | [o~ɔ] | و | ﻮ | | و |
| Ө ө | Ö ö | Ө ө | [ɵ] | ۅ | ـۅ | | ۅ |
| У у | U u | У у | [u~ʊ] | ﯗ | ـﯗ | | ﯗ |
| Ү ү | Ü ü | Ү ү | [y~ʏ] | ۉ | ـۉ | | ۉ |
| В в | W w | Ве | [v~w] | ﯞ | ـﯞ | | ﯞ |
| Э э | E e | Э э | [e] | ە | ﻪ | | ە |
| Ы ы | Y y | Ы ы | [ɯ~ɤ] | ﻯ | ﻯ | ـىـ | ىـ |
| И и | I i | И и | [i~ɪ] | ئ | ئ | ـئـ | ئـ |
| Й й | I i | Эй эй | [j] | ي | ي | ﻴ | ﻳ |
| | - | Кыбачы | | ء | | | |

In earlier versions of the alphabet, the sequence ي (ییی) was used to represent ы/и; the sequence ې (ېېې) was instead used to represent й. This modification was likely undone because of the historic role of ې representing /e/. Although ې was never a part of standardized Persian or Chagatai orthography, it possibly had precedent as a scribal variation of representing /e/ and its modern-day role in Pashto and Uyghur is also representing /e/. For this reason Kasym Tynystanov likely erred on the side of caution and settled on the modern scheme shown above.

== See also ==
- Romanization of Kyrgyz
- Kazakh alphabets
- Uyghur alphabets
