= Kyrgyz language =

Kipchak Turkic language of Central Asia

Kyrgyz
- Кыргыз тили kırgız tili قىرعىز تئلى
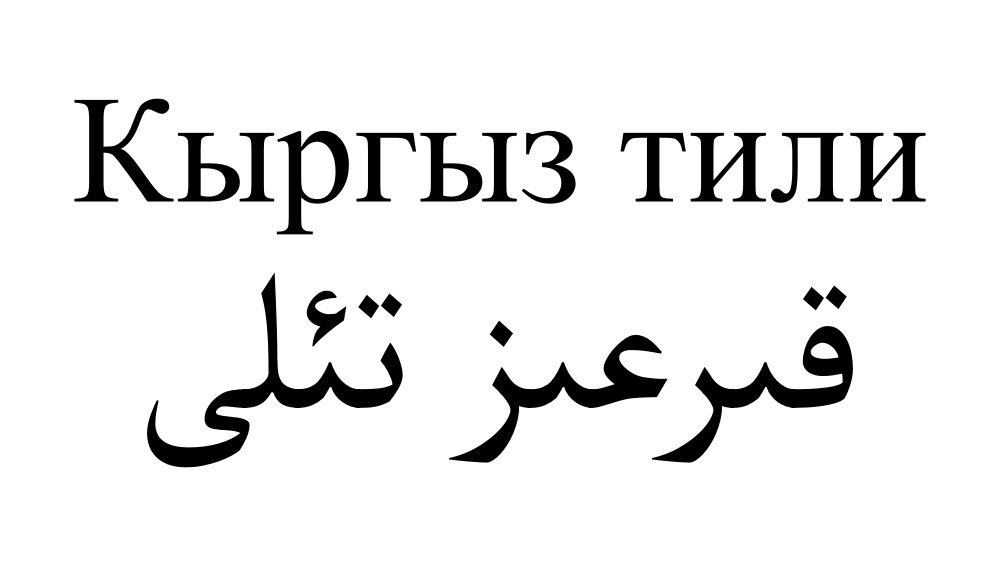
- Kyrgyz written in Cyrillic and Perso-Arabic scripts
- Pronunciation: [qʰɯɾʁɯ́s tʰɪlɪ́] [qʰɯɾʁɯ́st͡ɕʰɑ]
- Native to: Kyrgyzstan, Tajikistan, China
- Region: Central Asia
- Ethnicity: Kyrgyz
- Native speakers: (5.6 million cited 2000–2024)
- Language family: Turkic: Common Turkic; Kipchak; Kyrgyz–Kipchak; Kyrgyz
- Dialects: Pamiri Kyrgyz
- Writing system: Kyrgyz alphabets (Cyrillic script, Perso-Arabic script, Kyrgyz Braille) Historically, Old Turkic script

Official status
- Official language in: Kyrgyzstan; China: Kizilsu Kyrgyz Autonomous Prefecture; Organisations: Organization of Turkic States Collective Security Treaty Organization
- Recognised minority language in: Uzbekistan; Tajikistan

Language codes
- ISO 639-1: ky
- ISO 639-2: kir
- ISO 639-3: kir
- Glottolog: kirg1245
- Linguasphere: 44-AAB-cd
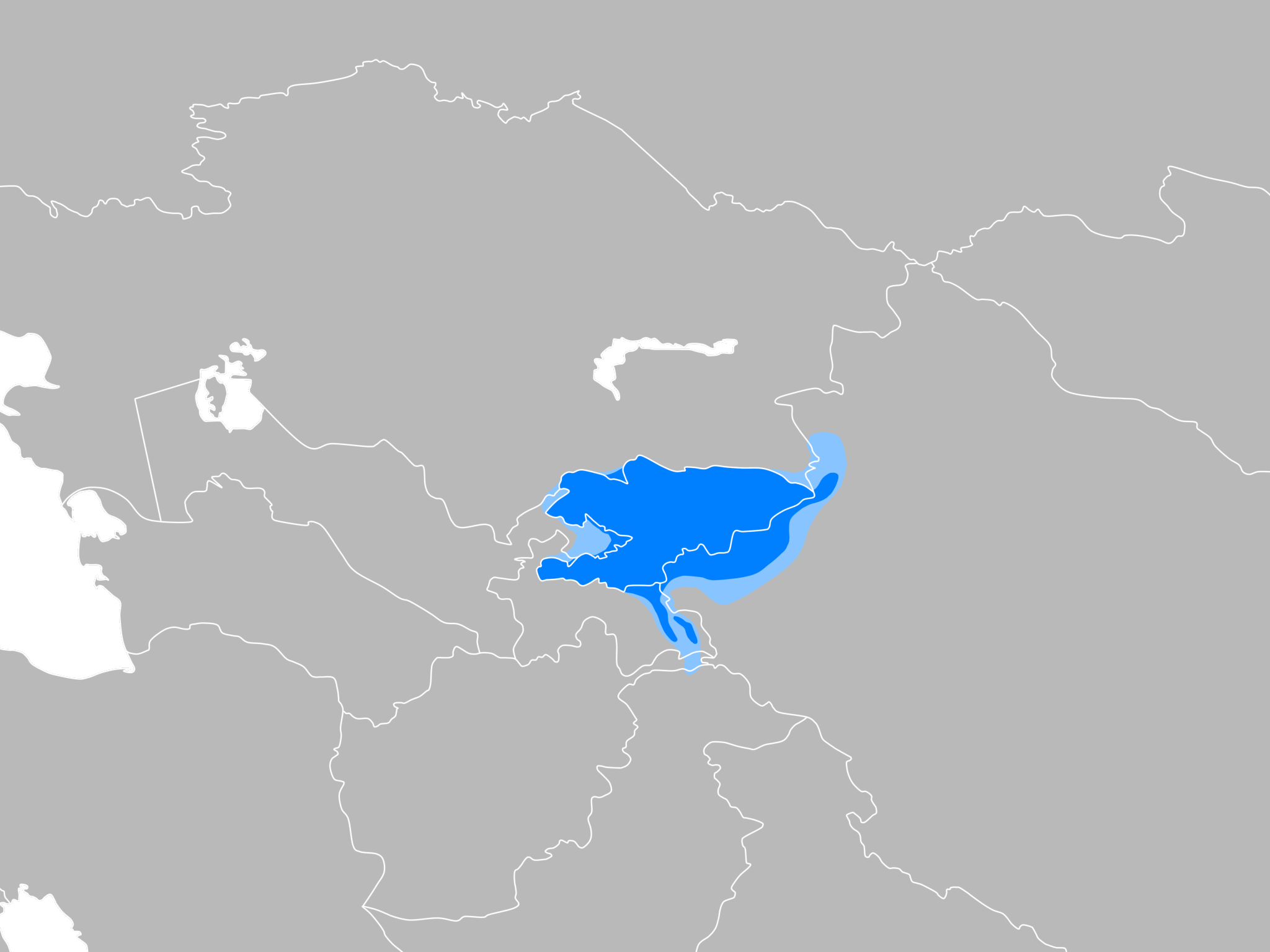
- Places where Kyrgyz is spoken

A speaker of the Kyrgyz language in traditional dress, recorded on the Chunkurchak pasture on the outskirts of Bishkek during an interview

Azim, a speaker of the Kyrgyz language, recorded in Taiwan

Kyrgyz (Note: English: /ˈkɪərɡɪz, ˈkɜːrɡɪz/; Cyrillic: Кыргыз тили / Кыргызча; Latin: Kyrgyz tili / Kyrgyzcha; Arabic: قىرعىز تئلى / قىرعىزچا; IPA: [qʰɯɾʁɯ́s tʰɪlɪ́, qʰɯɾʁɯ́st͡ɕʰɑ]) is a Turkic language of the Kipchak branch spoken in Central Asia. It is the official language of Kyrgyzstan and a significant minority language in the Kizilsu Kyrgyz Autonomous Prefecture in Xinjiang, China and in the Gorno-Badakhshan Autonomous Region of Tajikistan. There is a very high level of mutual intelligibility between Kyrgyz, Kazakh, and Altay. A dialect of Kyrgyz known as Pamiri Kyrgyz is spoken in north-eastern Afghanistan and northern Pakistan. Kyrgyz is also spoken by many ethnic Kyrgyz through the former Soviet Union, Afghanistan, Turkey, parts of northern Pakistan, and Russia.

Kyrgyz was originally written in Göktürk script, gradually replaced by the Perso-Arabic alphabet (in use until 1928 in the USSR, still in use in China). Between 1928 and 1940, a Latin-script alphabet, the Uniform Turkic Alphabet, was used. In 1940, Soviet authorities replaced the Latin script with the Cyrillic alphabet for all Turkic languages on its territory. When Kyrgyzstan became independent following the Soviet Union's collapse in 1991, a plan to adopt the Latin alphabet became popular. Although the plan has not been implemented, it remains in occasional discussion.

== Classification ==
Kyrgyz is a Common Turkic language belonging to the Kipchak branch of the family. It is considered to be an East Kipchak language, forming a subfamily with the Southern Altai language within the greater Kipchak branch. Internally, Kyrgyz has two distinct varieties; Northern and Southern Kyrgyz.

Kyrgyz should not be confused with Old Kyrgyz (Yenisei Kyrgyz), which is a member of the South Siberian branch of Turkic languages. The living successor languages of Yenisei Kyrgyz are the Khakas language in the Russian Federation and the Fuyu Kyrgyz language in Northeastern China.

== History ==
In 925, when the Liao dynasty defeated the Yenisei Kyrgyz and expelled them from the Mongolian steppes, some Ancient Kyrgyz elites settled in Altai and Xinjiang where they mixed with the local Kipchaks, resulting in a language shift.

After the Mongol conquest in 1207 and a series of revolts against the Yuan dynasty, Kyrgyz-speaking tribes started to migrate to Tian Shan, which was already populated by various Turco-Mongol tribes. As Chaghatai Ulus subjects, the Kyrgyz converted to Islam. This resulted in the Kyrgyz language absorbing Persian and Arabic loanwords, but to a much lesser extent than Kazakh, Uzbek and Uyghur.

== Dialects ==
Kyrgyz is divided into two main dialects, Northern and Southern. The Northern dialect has more Mongolian loanwords while the Southern one has more Uzbek ones. Standard Kyrgyz is based on Northern Kyrgyz. There is also a third smaller dialect called Pamiri Kyrgyz.

== Phonology ==
=== Vowels ===
Kyrgyz vowel phonemes
	Front		Back	
	unrounded	rounded	unrounded	rounded
Close	i	y	ɯ	u
Mid	e	ø		o
Open	(a)		ɑ	

/a/ appears only in borrowings from Persian or when followed by a front vowel later in the word (regressive assimilation), e.g. /ajdøʃ/ 'sloping' instead of */ɑjdøʃ/. In most dialects, its status as a vowel distinct from /ɑ/ is questionable.

==== Vowel harmony ====
The United States Peace Corps trains its volunteers using a "Left-Right Shift" method when carrying out language training in Kyrgyzstan.

Vowel Harmony (Peace Corps Method)
Open vowels	Shift	Close vowels	Example words
А (A)	⟷	Ы (I)	аттарыбыздан (attarıbızdan) "from our names"
А (A)	⟵	У (U)	колдорубуздан (koldorubuzdan) "from our hands"
О (O)	⟶	У (U)	колдорубуздан (koldorubuzdan) "from our hands"
Ө (Ö)	⟷	Ү (Ü)	көлдөрүбүздөн (köldörübüzdön) "from our lakes"
Э (Е)	⟷	И (İ)	иттерибизден (itteribizden) "from our dogs"

The strict vowel harmony system causes some notable phonotactical restrictions in vowels:

1. A word can only contain one vowel from each column, so if a word has Ö in its initial syllable, it will not contain A, O or E. And, since Ö points at Ü, the word also won't contain I, U or İ.
2. This system effectively makes the only distinction of vowels in non-initial syllables by height.

Some notable exceptions include the long rounded vowels (/oː/ /uː/ /øː/ /yː/), which can appear in suffixes regardless of roundedness of the previous vowels (although still following the front-back row harmony), and back rounded vowels, which unround to A after U, therefore creating the following order of vowels in a word with O in its initial syllable: O → U → A ↔︎ I

=== Consonants ===
Kyrgyz consonant phonemes
		Labial	Dental/ alveolar	Post- alveolar	Dorsal
Nasal		m	n		ŋ
Plosive	voiceless	p	t		k
Plosive	voiced	b	d		ɡ
Affricate	voiceless			t͡ʃ	
Affricate	voiced			d͡ʒ	
Fricative	voiceless		s	ʃ	x*
Fricative	voiced		z		
Approximant			l		j
Trill			r		

/x/ only occurs in loanwords.

== Lexicon ==
Kyrgyz has spent centuries in contact with numerous other languages, and as such has borrowed extensively from them. These languages include: Uzbek, Oirat, Mongolian, Russian, and Arabic.

== Orthography ==
Historically the Old Turkic Script was the first script used to write Kyrgyz.

The Kyrgyz in Kyrgyzstan use a Cyrillic alphabet, which uses all the Russian letters plus ң, ө and ү. In the Xinjiang region of China, an Arabic alphabet is used. Between 1928 and 1940, a Latin alphabet was used for many minority languages in the USSR, including Kyrgyz. There have been attempts after 1990 to introduce other Latin alphabets which are closer to the Turkish alphabet, e.g. the Common Turkic Alphabet. There are political shades to the Cyrillic-Latin debate. In April 2023 the chairman of Kyrgyzstan's National Commission for the State Language and Language Policies, Kanybek Osmonaliev, announced that Kyrghyz would change the alphabet from Cyrillic to Latin to bring the country in line with other Turkic nations. Osmonaliev was reprimanded by President Sadyr Japarov, who later clarified that Kyrgyzstan had no plans to replace the Cyrillic alphabet.

Comparison of Kyrgyz alphabets
Cyrillic	Braille	Arabic	Çaŋalip Latin (1928–1938)
А а	⠁	ا	A a
Б б	⠃	ب	B ʙ
В в	⠺	ۋ	V v
Г г	⠛	گ ع*	G g, Ƣ ƣ
Д д	⠙	د	D d
Е е	⠑	ە	E e
Ё ё	⠡	ي+و(يو)	Jo jo
Ж ж	⠚	ج	Ç ç (Ƶ ƶ from 1938)
З з	⠵	ز	Z z
И и	⠊	ئ	I i
Й й	⠯	ي	J j
К к	⠅	ك ق*	K k, Q q
Л л	⠇	ل	L l
М м	⠍	م	M m
Н н	⠝	ن	N n
Ң ң	⠽	ڭ	Ꞑ ꞑ / Ŋ ŋ
О о	⠕	و	O o
Ө ө	⠌	ۅ	Ɵ ɵ
П п	⠏	پ	P p
Р р	⠗	ر	R r
С с	⠎	س	S s
Т т	⠞	ت	T t
У у	⠥	ۇ	U u
Ү ү	⠧	ۉ	Y y
Ф ф	⠋	ف	F f
Х х	⠓	ح	H h
Ц ц	⠉	(ت+س (تس	Ts ts
Ч ч	⠟	چ	C c
Ш ш	⠱	ش	Ş ş
Щ щ	⠭	-	ŞÇ şç
Ъ ъ	⠷	-	-
Ы ы	⠮	ى	Ь ь
Ь ь	⠾	-	-
Э э	⠪	ە	E e
Ю ю	⠳	ي+ۇ(يۇ)	Ju ju
Я я	⠫	ي+ا(يا)	Ja ja

== Morphology and syntax ==
Kyrgyz follows a subject-object-verb word order, Kyrgyz also has no grammatical gender with gender being implied through context. Kyrgyz lacks several analytic grammatical features that English has, these include: auxiliary verbs (ex: to have), definite articles (ex: the), indefinite articles (ex: a/an), and modal verbs (ex: should; will), dependent clauses, and subordinating conjugations (ex: that; before; while). Kyrgyz instead replaces these with various synthetic grammatical structures.

=== Case ===
Nouns in Kyrgyz take a number of case endings that change based on vowel harmony and the sort of consonant they follow (see the section on phonology).

Case	Underlying form	Possible forms	"boat"	"air"	"bucket"	"hand"	"head"	"salt"	"eye"
Nominative	—		кеме	аба	челек	кол	баш	туз	көз
Genitive	-NIn	-нын, -нин, -дын, -дин, -тын, -тин, -нун, -нүн, -дун, -дүн, -тун, -түн	кеме**нин**	аба**нын**	челек**тин**	кол**дун**	баш**тын**	туз**дун**	көз**дүн**
Dative	-GA	-га, -ка, -ге, -ке, -го, -ко, -гө, -кө	кеме**ге**	аба**га**	челек**ке**	кол**го**	баш**ка**	туз**га**	көз**гө**
Accusative	-NI	-ны, -ни, -ды, -ди, -ты, -ти, -ну, -нү, -ду, -дү, -ту, -тү	кеме**ни**	аба**ны**	челек**ти**	кол**ду**	баш**ты**	туз**ду**	көз**дү**
Locative	-DA	-да, -де, -та, -те, -до, -дө, -то, -тө	кеме**де**	аба**да**	челек**те**	кол**до**	баш**та**	туз**да**	көз**дө**
Ablative	-DAn	-дан, -ден, -тан, -тен, -дон, -дөн, -тон, -төн	кеме**ден**	аба**дан**	челек**тен**	кол**дон**	баш**тан**	туз**дан**	көз**дөн**

Normally the decision between the velar ([ɡ ~ ɣ], [k]) and uvular ([ɢ ~ ʁ] and [χ ~ q]) pronunciation of ⟨г⟩ and ⟨к⟩ is based on the backness of the following vowel—i.e. back vowels imply a uvular rendering and front vowels imply a velar rendering—and the vowel in suffixes is decided based on the preceding vowel in the word.

=== Pronouns ===
Kyrgyz has eight personal pronouns:

Personal pronouns
		singular	plural
1st person		Мен (Men)	Биз (Biz)
2nd person	informal	Сен (Sen)	Силер (Siler)
2nd person	formal	Сиз (Siz)	Сиздер (Sizder)
3rd person		Ал (Al)	Алар (Alar)

The declension of the pronouns is outlined in the following chart. Singular pronouns (with the exception of сиз, which used to be plural) exhibit irregularities, while plural pronouns don't. Irregular forms are highlighted in bold.

Declension of pronouns
	Singular				Plural			
	1st	2nd		3rd	1st	2nd		3rd
	1st	informal	formal	3rd	1st	informal	formal	3rd
Nom	мен	сен	сиз	ал	биз	силер	сиздер	алар
Acc	**мени**	**сени**	сизди	**аны**	бизди	силерди	сиздерди	аларды
Gen	**менин**	**сенин**	сиздин	**анын**	биздин	силердин	сиздердин	алардын
Dat	**мага**	**сага**	сизге	**ага**	бизге	силерге	сиздерге	аларга
Loc	менде	сенде	сизде	анда	бизде	силерде	сиздерде	аларда
Abl	менден	сенден	сизден	андан	бизден	силерден	сиздерден	алардан

In addition to the pronouns, there are several more sets of morphemes dealing with person.

Morphemes indicating person
		pronouns	copulas	present tense	possessive endings	past/conditional	imperative
1st sg		мен	-mIn	-mIn	-(I)m	-(I)m	-AyIN
2nd sg	informal	сен	-sIŋ	-sIŋ	-(I)ŋ	-(I)ŋ	—, -GIn
2nd sg	formal	сиз	-sIz	-sIz	-(I)ŋIz	-(I)ŋIz	-GIlA
3rd sg		ал	—	-t	-(s)I(n)	—	-sIn
1st pl		биз	-BIz	-BIz	-(I)bIz	-(I)K	-AlI,-YlI
2nd pl	informal	силер	-sIŋAr	-sIŋAr	-(I)ŋAr	-(I)ŋAr	
2nd pl	formal	сиздер	-sIzdAr	-sIzdAr	-(I)ŋIzdAr	-(I)nIzdAr	
3rd pl		алар	—	-(I)şAt	-(s)I(n)	—	-sIn, -IşsIn

=== Verbs ===
Verbs are conjugated by analyzing the root verb: 1) determine whether the end letter is a vowel or consonant 2) add appropriate suffix while following vowel-harmony/shift rules.

Simple present tense conjugations (Peace Corps)
		Per. Pronoun	Vowel	Consonant
1st sg		Мен	-м	-м
2nd pl	informal	Сен	-йс<ң	-йс<ң
2nd pl	formal	Сиз	-йс<з	-йс<з
3rd sg		Ал	-йт	-йт
1st pl		Биз	-йб>з	-<б>з
2nd pl	informal	Силер		
2nd pl	formal	Сиздер		
3rd pl		Алар		

==== Subordinate clauses ====
To form complement clauses, Kyrgyz nominalises verb phrases. For example, "I don't know what I saw" would be:

Мен эмнени көргөнүмдү билбейм
Men emneni körgönümdü bilbeym
I what-ACC.DEF see-ing-1SG-ACC.DEF know-NEG-1SG
roughly "I don't know my having seen what," where the verb phrase "I saw what" is treated as a nominal object of the verb "to know."

The sentence above is also an excellent example of Kyrgyz vowel harmony; notice that all the vowel sounds are front vowels.

Several nominalisation strategies are used depending on the temporal properties of the relativised verb phrase: -GAn(dIK) for general past tense, -Ar for future/potential unrealised events, and -A turgan(dɯq) for non-perfective events are the most common. The copula has an irregular relativised form экен(дик) which may be used equivalently to forms of the verb бол- be (болгон(дук), болор). Relativised verb forms may, and often do, take nominal possessive endings as well as case endings.

== Sample text ==
Article 1 of the Universal Declaration of Human Rights:

Cyrillic script
Бардык адамдар өз беделинде жана укуктарында эркин жана тең укуктуу болуп жаралат. Алардын аң-сезими менен абийири бар жана бири-бирине бир туугандык мамиле кылууга тийиш.
Arabic script
باردىق ادامدار ۅز بەدەلىندە جانا ۇقۇقتارىندا ەركىن جانا تەڭ ۇقۇقتۇۇ بولۇپ جارالات. الاردىن اڭ-سەزىمى مەنەن ابئيىرى بار جانا بئرى-بىرىنە بئر تۇۇعاندىق مامئلە قىلۇۇعا تئيىش.
Latin script
Bardyk adamdar öz bedelinde jana ukuktarynda erkin jana teng ukuktuu bolup jaralat. Alardyn ang-sezimi menen abiiri bar jana biri-birine bir tuugandyk mamile kyluuga tiish.
IPA transcription
[bɑɾˈdɯq ɑdɑmˈdɑɾ øz bedelɪnˈde d͡ʒɑˈnɑ uquqtɑɾɯnˈdɑ eɾˈkin d͡ʒɑˈnɑ teŋ uquqˈtuː boˈɫup d͡ʒɑɾɑˈɫɑt ‖ ɑɫɑɾˈdɯn ɑɴ‿seziˈmi meˈnen ɑβijiˈɾi bɑr d͡ʒɑˈnɑ biɾi‿βiɾiˈne biɾ tuːʁɑnˈdɯq mamiˈle qɯɫuːˈʁɑ tiˈjiɕ ‖]
English translation
All human beings are born free and equal in dignity and rights. They are endowed with reason and conscience and should act towards one another in a spirit of brotherhood.

== See also ==
- BGN/PCGN romanization of Kyrgyz
- Kyrgyz people
- Romanization of Kyrgyz

== Bibliography ==
- Kara, Dávid Somfai (2003), Kyrgyz, Lincom Europa, ISBN 978-3-89586-843-6
- Krippes, Karl A. (1998). Kyrgyz: Kyrgyz-English/English-Kyrgyz: Glossary of Terms. Hippocrene Books, New York. ISBN 978-0-7818-0641-1.
- Library of Congress, Country Studies, Kyrgyzstan.
- Comrie, Bernard. 1983. The languages of the Soviet Union. Cambridge: Cambridge University Press.
- Beckwith, Christopher I. 1987/1993. "The Tibetan Empire in Central Asia." Princeton: Princeton University Press.
- Tchoroev, Tyntchtykbek. 2003. The Kyrgyz.; in: The History of Civilisations of Central Asia, Vol. 5, Development in contrast: from the sixteenth to the mid-nineteenth century /Editors: Ch. Adle and Irfan Habib. Co-editor: Karl M. Baipakov. – UNESCO Publishing. Multiple History Series. Paris. – Chapter 4, p. 109–125. (ISBN 978-92-3-103876-1).
- Washington, Jonathan North (2006b), Root Vowels and Affix Vowels: Height Effects in Kyrgyz Vowel Harmony (PDF), archived from the original (PDF) on 2007-01-13
- Washington, Jonathan North (2007), Phonetic and Phonological Problems in Kyrgyz: A Fulbrighter's plans for gathering data in the field (PDF), archived from the original (PDF) on 2016-01-13
