= The Phonetic Journal =

Linguistics journal

Cover of Volume 35 of The Phonetic Journal (1876)

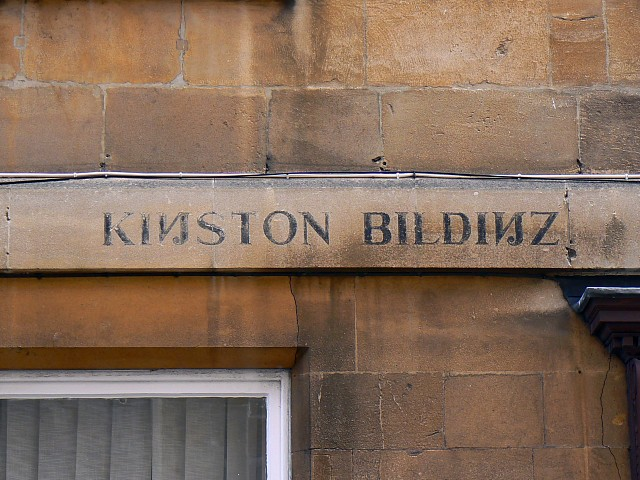
Kingston Buildings in Bath where The Phonetic Society was located

The Phonetic Journal was the official journal of The Phonetic Society based at the Kingston Buildings in Bath, Somerset, England and is the first ever journal about phonetics. It was published subtitled as Published Weekly, Devoted to the Propagation of Phonetic Shorthand, and Phonetic Reading, Writing and Printing.

It was printed starting 1841 by Isaac Pitman, and published by F. Pitman at the Phonetic Depot, at 20, Paternoster Row, in London. The journal was initially in 12 small pages plus a 4-page advertising and information wrapper per issue. It published materials in traditional spelling as well as in phonetic spelling, and phonetic shorthand. It also included news of the Phonetic Society and its members.

== The Phonetic Alphabet ==
The journal promoted The Phonetic Alphabet. It explained the alphabet promoted as "consisting of 36 letters, namely the 23 useful letters of the common alphabet (c, q and x being rejected) and 13 new letters included. The vowels a, e, i, o, u were used for their short sound as in pat, pet, pit, pot and put and all the other letters having their usual signification".

A proposed order of the alphabet was as follows:

Consonants: p, b; t, d; ç, j; k, g; f, v; [th], [dh], s, z; ʃ, ʒ; m, n, ŋ; l, r; w, y; h.

Vowels: a, ɐ; e, ɛ; i, [ee]; o, [o]; γ, σ; u, ɥ.

Diphthongs: ei (as in by), iu (as in new), ou (as in now), ai (as in ay), oi (as in ay).

The alphabet also included 9 "foreign sounds", 7 from French and 2 from German.

=== Further contributions for a proposed alphabet ===
Pitman published Phonotypy in 1844, his major work on spelling reform just three years after the founding of the journal. Pitman and Alexander John Ellis, an English mathematician and philologist jointly proposed in 1845 an English Phonotypic Alphabet made up of 40 letters based mainly on the Phonetic Alphabet of The Phonetic Journal in The Phonotypic Journal, a sister publication.

Furthermore, in a book edited in 1848, under the title A Plea for Spelling Reform, Ellis and Pitman compiled a series of articles from The Phonetic Journal. and from other periodicals, recommending an enlarged alphabet and "A Reformed Spelling of the English Language" as a "means of placing the arts of Reading and Writing within the reach of all who speak the English language or wish acquire it", as Pitman said in the intro.

== See also ==
- English-language spelling reform
- English Phonotypic Alphabet

== Notes ==
- Sample volume of The Phonetic Journal. (Vol. 41 for the year 1882)
