= Sinai and Comparative New Testament =

The Sinai and Comparative New Testament was published in 1881 by Edwin Leigh.

The New Testament was published following the Authorized Version, with variations in the Greek texts of the Sinai, Vatican, Alexandrian and Received noted with different styles of font. This New Testament edition allowed readers who were not familiar with Greek, or did not have had the income to purchase scholarly works, to quickly look and see what the latest discoveries in textual criticism were.

The first edition was bound in leather with the Gospels and a preface. Not many were published and it can be hard to find today.

== See also ==
- Modern English Bible translations
