= Pronouncing Orthography =

1864 Child's English language primer

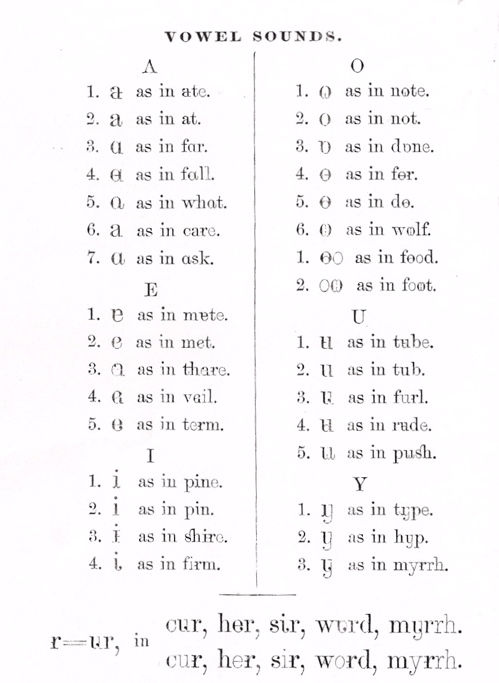
Pronouncing Orthography vowels

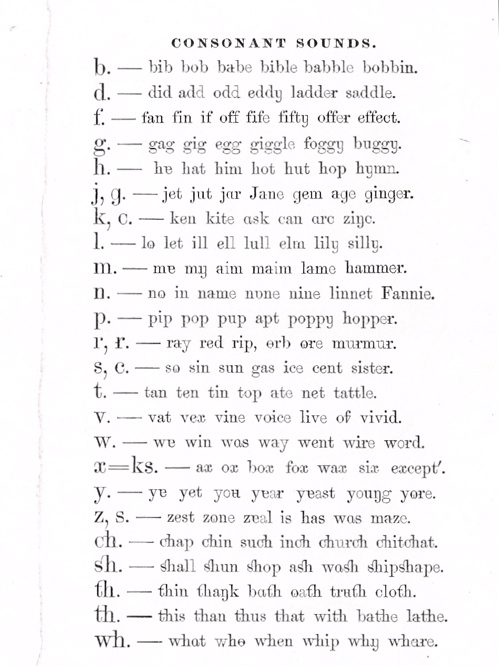
Pronouncing Orthography consonants

Pronouncing Orthography was an English spelling reform first published in 1864 by Edwin Leigh as a way to help children learn to read more quickly and easily. It aimed to improve literacy education by eliminating the irregularities of conventional English orthography and adhering to the alphabetic principle, wherein every letter represented a specific sound. This allowed children to read words by combining elementary sounds using phonics.

== Design philosophy ==
=== Parity with English orthography ===
The principal objective of Leigh's phonetic orthography was to enable children to correctly convert written words to speech regardless of whether the child was pre-acquainted with a particular word or not. In contrast, standard English orthography's myriad rules and exceptions made this difficult.

Leigh wanted to avoid prejudice similar to that encountered against the English Phonotypic Alphabet by making his new orthography familiar to standard English orthography, so the Latin alphabet and spelling conventions were fully retained. Leigh balanced phonetic precision with grapheme regularity by making silent letters in words faint, so that the original forms of words were roughly maintained. Leigh also subtly embellished letters with multiple modified forms, so children were explicitly aware of the possible sounds made by the "common letters", while maintaining harmony with English orthography.

Leigh utilised the pronouncing dictionaries of John Walker and Benjamin Humphrey Smart, two of the leading orthoepists of the time, to ensure his orthography resulted in correct pronunciation.

=== Reading versus writing ===
Leigh separated learning to read from learning to write; he described his position in his report to the Boston school committee (one of the cities which trialled Leigh's methods):

As to script, I stated my own conviction that it has no proper connection with learning to read and my desire to know from the writing master whether the habits formed by such writing of such words on the slate by so young learners will not have a bad influence upon their future handwriting and whether they will not acquire the art better at a later period and by exercises designed specially for the acquisition of good habits and skill in penmanship.

In a letter to Leigh, Lewis Soldan, a St. Louis educator, suggested children should learn to read using his orthography and then transition to standard English orthography, where they would learn to write.

=== Categories of correspondences ===
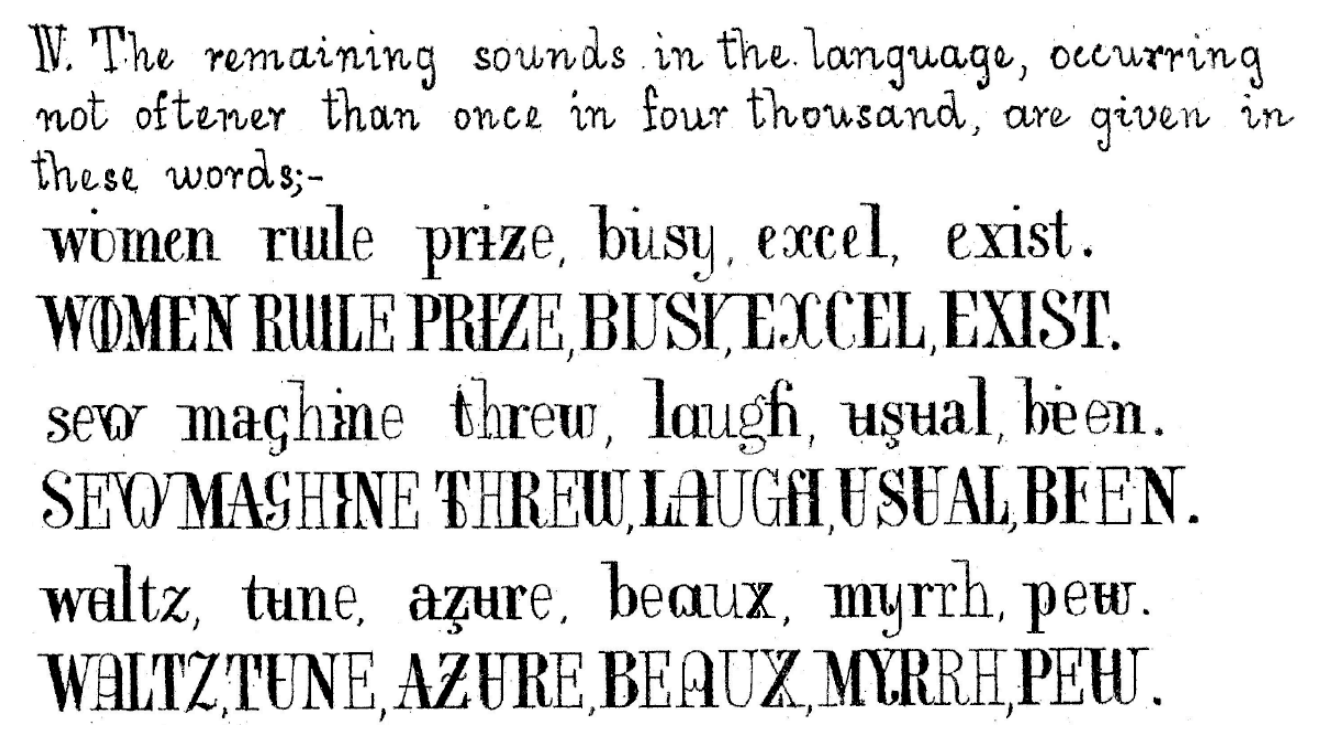
Grapheme to phoneme correspondences which occur less than once in every four thousand utterances, shown in Pronouncing Orthography

Leigh considered the sequence in which Pronouncing Orthography could be taught when he segmented letter sounds into four utterance categories (how often the sounds occur in speech):

Segment	Occurrence
I	Once in every <200 utterances (most common)
II	Once in every 200–999 utterances
III	Once in every 1000–3999 utterances
IV	Once in every ≥4000 utterances (least common)

He suggested avoiding teaching category IV sounds using Pronouncing Orthography and instead waiting until the child has transitioned to conventional orthography, whilst the other categories are taught in sequence.

== In practice ==
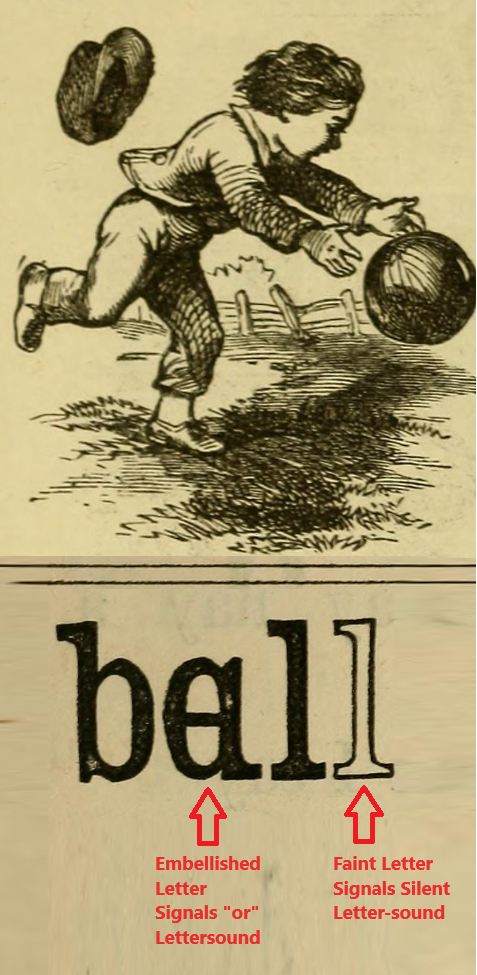
The word ball written in Pronouncing Orthography.

Leigh converted existing basal reading schemes to Pronouncing Orthography for expediency. He was agnostic about which methods teachers used for teaching literacy, as he presumed the benefits of phonetic understanding would be secured by using his orthography in combination with whatever was determined the best available methods. In reality, Leigh's orthography did not lend itself to writing because of the asymmetrical application of the alphabetical principle. So every letter (grapheme) equated to a single sound (phoneme), allowing children to read with absolute certainty, but every sound (phoneme) equated to a multitude of possible letters (graphemes), meaning children would not know with certainty how to write an unfamiliar word. This was necessary to keep words written in Pronouncing Orthography resembling those in conventional English orthography.

== Award ==
At the Vienna Exposition of 1873, Leigh was awarded the Medal of Progress as a recognition of merit for his invention of Pronouncing Orthography.

== Bibliography ==
- Leigh, Edwin (1864). "Pronouncing Orthography" (PDF). Library of Congress: 1–13. LCCN 11016110. Archived from the original (PDF) on 2023-07-02.
- Leigh, Edwin (1877). Hillard's Primer: Edited in Pronouncing Orthography. New York & Chicago: Taintor Brothers, Merrill and Company. LCCN 12008258.
- Philbrick, John D.; Leigh, Edwin (1878). Annual Report of the School Committee of the City of Boston: 1877 (Report). Boston: Rockwell and Churchill City Printers. pp. 55–64.
- Soldan, Lewis; Leigh, Edwin (1878-09-19). "Pronouncing orthography, and script". National Journal of Education. 8 (11): 179. JSTOR 44957189.
- Stearns, Josiah (1868-12-01). "Dr. Leigh's Phonetic Printing". The Massachusetts Teacher. 21 (12): 458–461. JSTOR 45026673.
