= Benjamin Franklin's phonetic alphabet =

1768 proposed spelling reform for English

Benjamin Franklin's phonetic alphabet was Benjamin Franklin's proposal for a spelling reform of the English language. The alphabet was based on the Latin alphabet used in English, though with eng and several additional letters that Franklin newly invented.

== The alphabet ==
Franklin modified the standard English alphabet by omitting the letters c, j, q, w, x, and y, and adding new letters to explicitly represent the open-mid back rounded [ɔ] and unrounded [ʌ] vowels, and the consonants sh [ʃ], ng [ŋ], dh [ð], and th [θ]. It was one of the earlier proposed spelling reforms to the English language. The alphabet consisted of 26 letters in the following order:

Franklin's proposed phonetic alphabet
Letter	o		a	e	i	u	ɥ	h
Letter name	o	ah	a	e	i	u	uh	huh
Pronunciation (IPA)	/oʊ/	/ɔː/ and /ɒ/	/æ/	/ɛ/ (sometimes modern /eɪ/)	/ɪ/, /j/, and unstressed /i/ (sometimes modern /iː/)	/ʊ/, /uː/, and /w/	/ʌ/	/h/
Letter	g	k		ŋ	n	r	t	d
Letter name	gi	ki	ish	ing	en	r	ti	di
Pronunciation (IPA)	/ɡ/	/k/	/ʃ/	/ŋ/	/n/	/r/	/t/	/d/
Letter	l	ſ	s (at the end of a word)	z			f	v
Letter name	el	es		ez	eth	edh	ef	ev
Pronunciation (IPA)	/l/	/s/ (and sometimes word-final /z/)		/z/	/θ/	/ð/	/f/	/v/
Letter	b	p	m					
Letter name	bi	pi	em					
Pronunciation (IPA)	/b/	/p/	/m/					

Other English phonemes are represented as follows:

- /hw/ is represented as hu (as in huɥi for why).
- /aɪ/ is represented as ɥi (as in ɥiz for eyes).
- /aʊ/ is represented u (as in hus for house).
- /dʒ/ is represented d (as in ed for age).
- /eɪ/, at the time more probably [eː~ɛː], is represented as ee or e (as in leet for late or kes for case).
- /ɛər/ is represented as eer (as in keer for care or eer for their).
- /ɜːr/ and /ər/ are represented as ɥr (as lɥrn for learn).
- /iː/ is represented as ii or i (as in ſtriim for stream).
- /ɔɪ/ is represented ɥi (as in distrɥi for destroy).
- /ɔːr/ is represented r (as in frget for forget).
  - /oʊr/, at the time separate, is represented or (as in kors for course).
- /tʃ/ is represented t (as in tit for cheat).
- /ʒ/ is represented z (as in mezɥr for measure).
- Unstressed vowels are generally represented by the letters used to represent their stressed equivalents. What today is considered a schwa is mostly represented with ɥ, although whenever spelled in standard English with a, Franklin maintains the symbol α.

From left to right, the extra symbols Franklin devised representing /ɔː/, /ʌ/, /ŋ/, /ð/, /θ/ and /ʃ/ respectively.

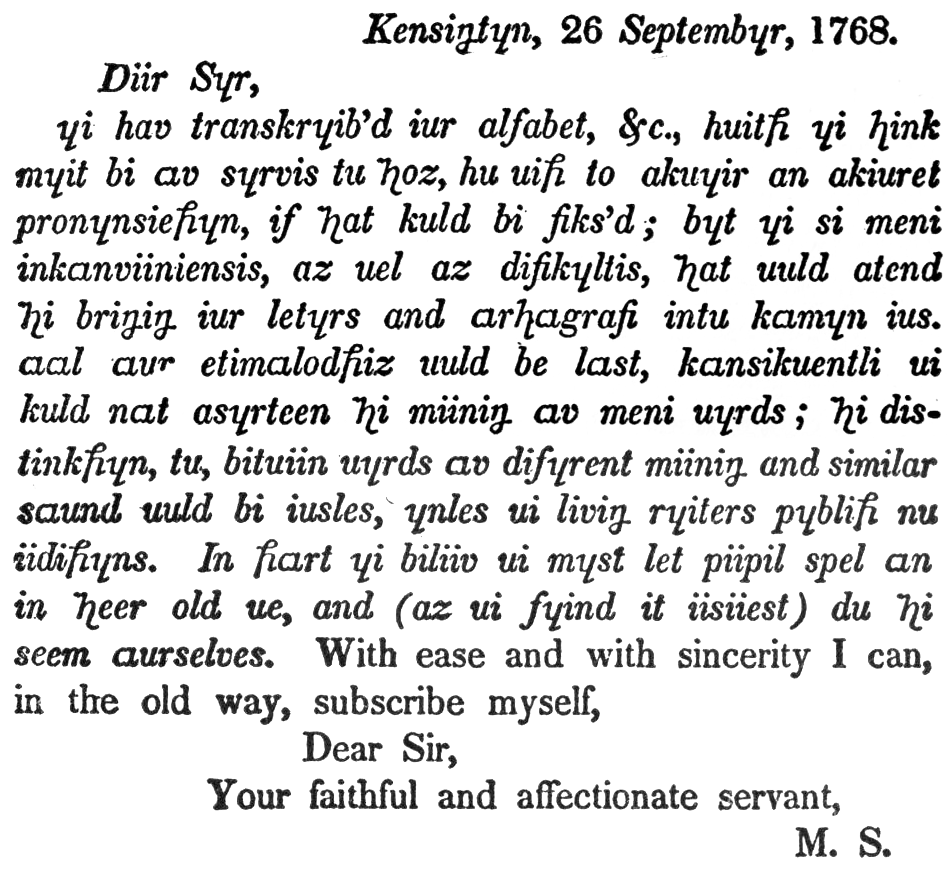
Sample text in Franklin's phonetic alphabet from a letter to Franklin. The text reads: "Kensington, 26 September, 1768. Dear Sir, I have transcribed your alphabet, etc., which I think might be of service to those, who wish to acquire an accurate pronunciation, if that could be fixed; but I see many inconveniences, as well as difficulties, that would attend the bringing your letters and orthography into common use. All our etymologies would be lost, consequently we could not ascertain the meaning of many words; the distinction, too, between words of different meaning and similar sound would be useless, unless we living writers publish new editions. In short I believe we must let people spell on in their old way, and (as we find it easiest) do the same ourselves."

== Vowels ==
Franklin's proposed alphabet included seven letters to represent vowels. This set consisted of two new letters, in addition to five letters from the existing English alphabet: α, e, i, o, u. The first new letter was formed as a ligature of the letters o and α – – and used to represent a sound that is roughly [ɔ] as transcribed in the International Phonetic Alphabet (IPA). The second new vowel letter, ɥ, was used to represent [ʌ] or [ə].

Franklin proposed the use of doubled letters to represent what he called long vowels, represented by modern phonemes in IPA thus: long /ɔː/ versus short /ɒ/ (or, in his notation, versus), long /eɪ/ versus short /ɛ/ (ee versus e), and long /iː/ for short /ɪ/ (ii versus i). In his examples of writing in the proposed alphabet, Franklin contrasts long and short uses of his letter e, with the words "mend" and "remain" which, respectively, he spelled mend and remeen. In this system, ee is used to represent the /eɪ/ sound in "late" and "pale". Likewise, ii is used to represent the /iː/ sound in "degrees", "pleased", and "serene". Sometimes Franklin's correspondences written in the new alphabet represent a long vowel not using a double letter but instead using a letter with a circumflex, ◌̂, as when he represents the /eɪ/ sound in "great" and "compared" with ê instead of ee. Franklin's long-short vowel distinctions appear not perfectly identical to the same distinctions in 21st-century English; for example, the only word shown to use is the word all, but not other words that in modern notation would use /ɔː/. This discrepancy may reflect Franklin's own inconsistencies, but, even more likely, it reflects legitimate differences in the English phonology of his particular time and place.

Franklin does not make a distinction between the modern /uː/ and /ʊ/ phonemes (in words like goose versus foot), which likely reveals another difference between 18th-century English pronunciation versus modern pronunciation.

== Consonants ==
Franklin's proposed alphabet included nineteen letters to represent consonants. This set consisted of four new letters, in addition to fifteen letters from the existing English alphabet: b, d, f, g, h, k, l, m, n, p, r, s (including the long s, ʃ, typical of his era) t, v, z. New letters were proposed to replace the English digraphs ng (= ŋ); sh (=); voiced th (=), and voiceless th (=). New consonant digraphs based on these new letters were used to represent the zh sound of measure (= z) and the affricate sounds of ch in cherry (= t) and j in jack (= d).

The most influential of Franklin's six new characters appears to have been the letter "eng", ŋ, for ng. It was later incorporated into the IPA. Alexander Gill the Elder used this letter in 1619.
