= Eng (letter) =

Letter of the Latin alphabet

Ŋ
- Ŋ ŋ

Usage
- Writing system: Latin script
- Type: Alphabetic and Logographic
- Language of origin: Avokaya language, Dagbani language, Dinka language, Ewe language, Fula language, Inari Sami language, Inupiaq language, Lakota language, Mandarin language, Northern Sami language, Nuer language, Nǁng language, Skolt Sami language, Tuareg language, Washo language
- Sound values: [ŋ]; [ŋ̊]; [ɲ]
- In Unicode: U+014A, U+014B

History
Development
I10
          - 𐌍
            - Ν ν
              - N n
                - Ng ng
                  - Ŋ ŋ
- Time period: 1619 to present
- Descendants: ʩ
- Sisters: Ꞑ ꞑ; Ƞ ƞ; Ɲ ɲ; ᶇ; ɳ; Ӈ ӈ
- Transliterations: ng

Other
- Associated graphs: n(x), ng
- Writing direction: Left-to-Right

Ŋ (minuscule: ŋ), known as eng, agma, or engma, is a Latin-script letter used to represent a voiced velar nasal, as in sing (/sɪŋ/), ring (/rɪŋ/), or thing (/θɪŋ/), in the written form of some languages and in the International Phonetic Alphabet.

In Washo, lower-case ⟨ŋ⟩ represents a typical [ŋ] sound, while upper-case ⟨Ŋ⟩ represents a voiceless [ŋ̊] sound. This convention comes from Americanist phonetic notation.

In Western Inland dialects of Northern Sámi, eng represents a palatal nasal [ɲ] like ⟨nj⟩ due to a merger; in other dialects, eng represents a velar nasal.

== History ==
The First Grammatical Treatise, a 12th-century work on the phonology of the Old Icelandic language, uses a single grapheme for the eng sound, shaped like a g with a stroke ⟨ǥ⟩. Alexander Gill the Elder uses an uppercase G with a hooked tail and a lowercase n with the hooked tail of a script g ⟨ŋ⟩ for the same sound in Logonomia Anglica in 1619. William Holder uses the letter in Elements of Speech: An Essay of Inquiry into the Natural Production of Letters, published in 1669, but it was not printed as intended; he indicates in his erratum that “there was intended a character for Ng, viz., n with a tail like that of g, which must be understood where the Printer has imitated it by n or y”. It was later used in Benjamin Franklin's phonetic alphabet, with its current phonetic value.

== Appearance ==
Lowercase eng is derived from n, with the addition of a hook to the right leg, somewhat like that of j or a g. Nowadays, the uppercase has two main variants: it can be based on the usual uppercase N, with a hook added (or "N-form"); or it can be an enlarged version of the lowercase (or "n-form"). The former is preferred in Sami languages that use it, the latter in African languages, such as in Shona from 1931 to 1955, and several in west and central Africa currently. In Isaac Pitman’s Phonotypic Alphabet, the uppercase had a reversed-N form.

Early printers, lacking a specific sort for eng, sometimes approximated it by rotating a capital G ⟨⅁⟩ or substituting a Greek letter eta ⟨η⟩, before modified to present form ⟨ŋ⟩ (the latter may be encoded as the Latin letter n with long right leg ⟨ƞ⟩ to distinguish it from the Greek letter).

== Pronunciation of words containing eng sound ==
In most languages eng is absent in the Latin alphabet but its sound can be present in the letter n in words. In English, it is heard in the potential digraphs nc (hard c), ng (hard g), nk, nq and nx, often at the end of words. For the pronunciation of ng with eng, it can be /ŋ/ in words such as singer and hanged and when it is in final position or /ŋg/ in words such as finger and angle.

In British English, n is pronounced eng in the prefixes en- and in- when they are followed by c, g and q, as in encroachment, engagement, enquiry, incursion, ingredient, inquiry and others. In other English dialects, the n is pronounced /n/ instead. In many British dialects, the ng in strength and length is simply pronounced /n/, with g a silent letter, and the ng is otherwise pronounced /ŋ/ in those words.

== Usage ==
=== Technical transcription ===
- Americanist phonetic notation, where it may also represent a uvular nasal.
- Sometimes for the transcription of Australian Aboriginal languages
- International Phonetic Alphabet, where it represent a voiced velar nasal
- Initial Teaching Alphabet
- Uralic Phonetic Alphabet including U+1D51 ᵑ MODIFIER LETTER SMALL ENG
- Teuthonista phonetic transcription system uses U+AB3C ꬼ LATIN SMALL LETTER ENG WITH CROSSED-TAIL
- Rheinische Dokumenta, a phonetic alphabet for many West Central German dialects, Low Rhenish, and few related languages.

=== Vernacular orthographies ===
Janalif variant of eng is represented as N with descender. An equivalent version (En with descender) is used in the Cyrillic alphabet.

Languages marked † no longer use eng, but formerly did.

- African languages
  - Bari
  - Bemba
  - Dagbani
  - Dinka
  - Efik
  - Ewe
  - Frafra
  - Fula
  - Ganda
  - Manding languages
  - Nuer
  - Shona language†
  - Songhay languages
  - Wolof
  - Zarma
- American languages
  - Inupiat
  - Lakota
  - O'odham
- Austroasiatic languages
  - Tonga
- Australian Aboriginal languages
  - Bandjalang
  - Yolŋu
- Languages of China
  - Zhuang† (replaced by the digraph ng in 1986)
  - Hanyu Pinyin † used ŋ as a short hand form of ng.
- Polynesian languages (all three using either ⟨g⟩ or ⟨ng⟩ when ⟨ŋ⟩ is not available on the keyboard)
  - Anutan language
  - Eɱae language
  - Rapa Nui language
- Sami languages
  - Inari Sami
  - Lule Sami
  - Northern Sami
  - Ume Sami
  - Skolt Sami
  - Kildin Sami (during Latinisation in the 1930s)
- Turkic languages during Latinisation in the 1930s used Ꞑ ꞑ, sometimes considered a variant of eng.
  - Kazakh language† (2019 revision of the Latin alphabet; replaced with Ñ in the April 2021 proposal)
- Mapuche language (Wirizüŋun script)
- Kalam languages
  - Kalam language

== Computer encoding ==
Eng is encoded in Unicode as U+014A LATIN CAPITAL LETTER ENG and U+014B LATIN SMALL LETTER ENG, part of the Latin Extended-A range. In ISO 8859-4 (Latin-4) it's located at BD (uppercase) and BF (lowercase).

In African languages such as Bemba, ng' (with an apostrophe) is widely used as a substitute in media where eng is hard to reproduce.

== Gallery ==
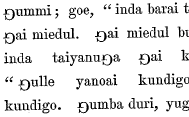
An 1856 text in Gamilaraay, using a rotated capital G as a substitute for ŋ.

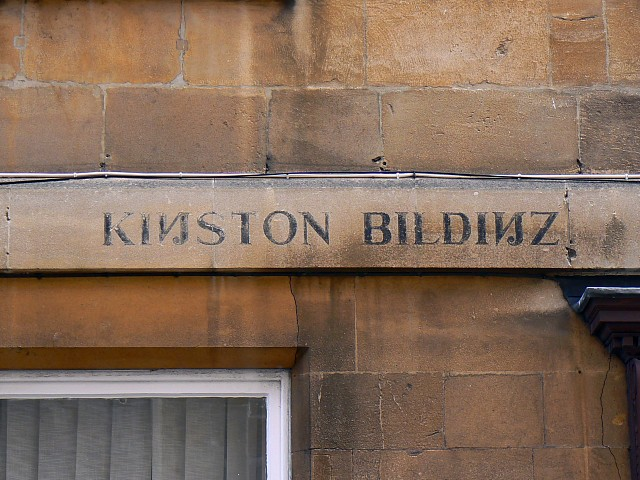
Uppercase eng with the reversed-N-form (almost resembles Cyrillic "и") on the Kingston Buildings in Bath, UK.

Lowercase and uppercase eng with the reversed-N-form of the uppercase used in a 1875 Gamilaraay text.

Eng used in a 1875 Gamilaraay text.
Italic ŋ based on double-storey g as used in Horatio Hale's Ethnography and Philology (1846).

ᶇ ɲ ɳ: four "n"-based IPA symbols for nasal sounds.

=== Forms ===
 Note that all forms still have ŋ as a lowercase.
First variant of capital form, appears in some sans-serif fonts

Second variant, appears in most fonts

Third variant resembling greek letter eta (η)

Fourth variant

Fifth variant, almost resembles Cyrillic "и" and used in Unifon

Sixth variant, completely resembles Cyrillic "и"

== See also ==
- Ng (digraph)
- Nh (digraph)
- g

Similar Latin letters:

- Ƞ ƞ
- Ɲ ɲ
- N n
- M m
- Ꞑ ꞑ
- Ɱ ɱ
- Ꜧ ꜧ
- ꬼ

Similar Cyrillic letters:

- Ӈ ӈ
- Ң ң
- Ҥ ҥ

Similar Greek letters:

- Η η
