= Kyrgyz Braille =

Braille alphabet of the Kyrgyz language

- Script type: Alphabet
- Print basis: Kyrgyz
- Languages: Kyrgyz

Related scripts
- Parent systems: Braille: Russian Braille; Kyrgyz Braille

The braille alphabet used for the Kyrgyz language is based on Russian Braille, with a few additional letters found in the print Kyrgyz alphabet.

== Alphabet ==
Kyrgyz Braille uses the entire Russian Braille alphabet, though some letters are only found in loans and in addition has the letters ң, ө, ү.

Print	а a	б b	в v	г g	д d	е ye	ё yo	ж j	з z	и i	й y	к k
Braille	⠁ (braille pattern dots-1)	⠃ (braille pattern dots-12)	⠺ (braille pattern dots-2456)	⠛ (braille pattern dots-1245)	⠙ (braille pattern dots-145)	⠑ (braille pattern dots-15)	⠡ (braille pattern dots-16)	⠚ (braille pattern dots-245)	⠵ (braille pattern dots-1356)	⠊ (braille pattern dots-24)	⠯ (braille pattern dots-12346)	⠅ (braille pattern dots-13)
Print	л l	м m	н n	ң ng	о o	ө ö	п p	р r	с s	т t	у u	ү ü
Braille	⠇ (braille pattern dots-123)	⠍ (braille pattern dots-134)	⠝ (braille pattern dots-1345)	⠽ (braille pattern dots-13456)	⠕ (braille pattern dots-135)	⠌ (braille pattern dots-34)	⠏ (braille pattern dots-1234)	⠗ (braille pattern dots-1235)	⠎ (braille pattern dots-234)	⠞ (braille pattern dots-2345)	⠥ (braille pattern dots-136)	⠧ (braille pattern dots-1236)
Print	ф f	х kh	ц ts	ч ch	ш sh	щ shch	ъ ”	ы ı	ь ’	э e	ю yu	я ya
Braille	⠋ (braille pattern dots-124)	⠓ (braille pattern dots-125)	⠉ (braille pattern dots-14)	⠟ (braille pattern dots-12345)	⠱ (braille pattern dots-156)	⠭ (braille pattern dots-1346)	⠷ (braille pattern dots-12356)	⠮ (braille pattern dots-2346)	⠾ (braille pattern dots-23456)	⠪ (braille pattern dots-246)	⠳ (braille pattern dots-1256)	⠫ (braille pattern dots-1246)

Although the non-Russian letters ң, ө, ү are found in many other Cyrillic alphabets, their braille assignments are unrelated to those or with international norms. Compare the ң, ө, ү of Kazakh Braille, for example.

== Punctuation ==
The question mark differs from Russian Braille.

Single punctuation:

Print	,	.	?	!	;	:	-
Braille	⠂ (braille pattern dots-2)	⠲ (braille pattern dots-256)	⠦ (braille pattern dots-236)	⠖ (braille pattern dots-235)	⠆ (braille pattern dots-23)	⠒ (braille pattern dots-25)	⠤ (braille pattern dots-36)

Paired punctuation:

Print	« ... »	( ... )
Braille	...	...

== Formatting ==
italics	capital	number
⠸ (braille pattern dots-456)	⠨ (braille pattern dots-46)	⠼ (braille pattern dots-3456)

== See also ==
- Kyrgyz alphabets § Correspondence chart, for the braille alphabet aligned with the Cyrillic
