= BGN/PCGN romanization of Kyrgyz =

BGN/PCGN romanization system for Kyrgyz is a method for romanization of Cyrillic Kyrgyz texts, that is, their transliteration into the Latin alphabet as used in the English language.

The BGN/PCGN system for transcribing Kyrgyz was designed to be relatively intuitive for anglophones to pronounce. It is part of the larger set of BGN/PCGN romanizations, which includes methods for twenty-nine different languages. It was developed by the United States Board on Geographic Names and by the Permanent Committee on Geographical Names for British Official Use.

This romanization of Kyrgyz can be rendered using the basic letters and punctuation found on English-language keyboards plus one diacritical mark: an umlaut (¨) to represent front vowels not otherwise represented by a roman character. The interpunct character (·) can also optionally be used to avoid certain ambiguity presented by the use of digraphs (e.g. ⟨ng⟩ represents ⟨ң⟩, and ⟨n·g⟩ may be used to represent ⟨нг⟩).

The following table describes the system and provides examples.

Russian letter	Romanization	Special provision	Examples
А (а)	A (a)	None	Көк-Жаңгак = Kök-Janggak
Б (б)	B (b)	None	Бишкек = Bishkek; Таш-Дөбө = Tash-Döbö
В (в)	V (v)	This letter occurs principally in Russian borrowings.	Владимир = Vladimir
Г (г)	G (g)	None	Көк-Жаңгак = Kök-Janggak
Д (д)	D (d)	None	Таш-Дөбө = Tash-Döbö
Е (е)	E (e)	This letter does not occur at the beginning of native Kyrgyz words, and actually represents something more like "ye" when preceded by a vowel.	Бишкек = Bishkek
Ё (ё)	Yo (yo)	This letter does not occur at the beginning of native Kyrgyz words.	
Ж (ж)	J (j)	None	Көк-Жаңгак = Kök-Janggak
З (з)	Z (z)	None	Боз-Тери = Boz-Teri
И (и)	I (i)	None	Бишкек = Bishkek
Й (й)	Y (y)	This letter does not occur in the beginning of a word in native Kyrgyz words.	Шамалдуу-Сай = Shamalduu-Say
К (к)	K (k)	None	Көк-Жаңгак = Kök-Janggak; Бишкек = Bishkek
Л (л)	L (l)	None	Ысык-көл = Ysyk-köl
М (м)	M (m)	None	Шамалдуу-Сай = Shamalduu-Say
Н (н)	N (n)	None	Баткен = Batken
Ң (ң)	Ng (ng)	This letter does not occur at the beginning of a word	Көк-Жаңгак = Kök-Janggak
О (о)	O (o)	None	
Ө (ө)	Ö (ö)	None	Көк-Жаңгак = Kök-Janggak
П (п)	P (p)	None	
Р (р)	R (r)	None	Боз-Тери = Boz-Teri
С (с)	S (s)	None	Ысык-көл = Ysyk-köl
Т (т)	T (t)	None	Таш-Дөбө = Tash-Döbö
У (у)	U (u)	None	
Ү (ү)	Ü (ü)	None	
Ф (ф)	F (f)	This letter occurs principally in Russian borrowings.	Фурманов = Furmanov
Х (х)	Kh (kh)	None	
Ц (ц)	Ts (ts)	This letter occurs principally in Russian borrowings.	Ельцин = Yel’tsin
Ч (ч)	Ch (ch)	None	
Ш (ш)	Sh (sh)	None	Таш-Дөбө = Tash-Döbö
Щ (щ)	Shch (shch)	This letter only occurs in Russian borrowings.	
Ъ (ъ)	”	This letter does not occur in the beginning of a word, and only occurs in Russian borrowings.	
Ы (ы)	Y (y)	This letter may optionally be transcribed as ɨ.	Ысык-көл = Ysyk-köl
Ь (ь)	’	This letter does not occur in the beginning of a word, and only occurs in Russian borrowings.	
Э (э)	E (e)	This letter only occurs doubled in native Kyrgyz words.	
Ю (ю)	Yu (yu)	This character does not occur at the beginning of native Kyrgyz words.	
Я (я)	Ya (ya)	This letter does not occur at the beginning of native Kyrgyz words.	

== See also ==
- ISO 9
