= Boylston Medical School =

Medical school in Boston, US

- Type: medical school
- Active: 1847–1855
- Founders: Winslow Lewis
- Location: Essex St. and Washington St., Boston, Massachusetts, United States; 42°21′8.53″N 71°3′45.40″W

The Boylston Medical School was a private medical school in Boston, Massachusetts that was incorporated by the Massachusetts Legislature in 1847 and dissolved in 1855.

== History ==
Boylston Medical School was started as a way to give more thorough education to medical students than was common at the time. It was the first in New England to offer three years of instruction instead of two, as was common in Europe at the time. The school, the second in Boston, had its own dissecting room and infirmary. Boylston was in direct competition with Harvard Medical School and was becoming known for its better instruction, despite not conferring degrees.

In 1854, the school petitioned the legislature for the power to grant medical degrees which was opposed by the Harvard Medical School faculty. The legislature saw favorably upon this and that year it gained the right to confer the Doctor of Medicine degree. Harvard's response was to change its method of instruction to match, and to hire the majority of Boylston's faculty for its own school. This effectively ended the Boylston Medical School, and it closed its doors in 1855.
