= English Phonotypic Alphabet =

19th century phonetic alphabet for the English language

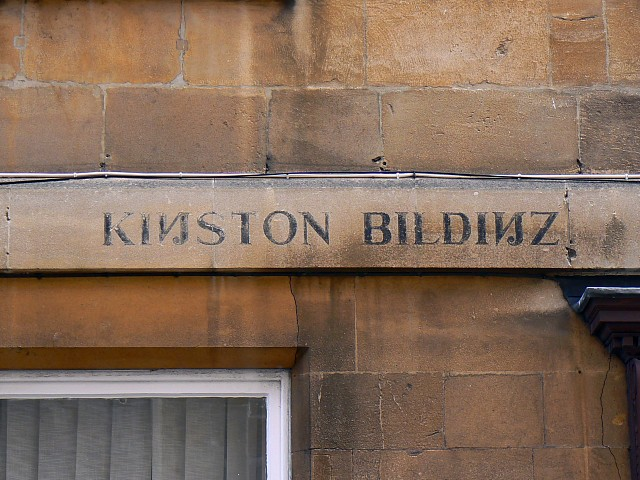
Street sign of Kingston Buildings in Bath, once seat of The Phonetic Society

The English Phonotypic Alphabet (EPA) is a phonetic alphabet developed by Sir Isaac Pitman and Alexander John Ellis, originally as an English language spelling reform. Although never gaining wide acceptance, elements of it were incorporated into the modern International Phonetic Alphabet.

It was originally published in October 1843 in The Phonotypic Journal, a sister publication of The Phonetic Journal, and first "completed" in June 1845 (though there were several subsequent revisions). Further adaptations were published which extended the alphabet to the German, Arabic, Spanish, Tuscan, French, Welsh, Italian, Dutch, Polish, Portuguese and Sanskrit languages.

== Purpose ==
The philosophical case for the EPA was made by Ellis, who conducted an extensive study of the problems with English orthography, which he published in his treatise Plea for Phonetic Spelling, or the Necessity of Orthographic Reform, in 1848. Learned societies such as the London Philological Society and education journals such as The Massachusetts Teacher debated the arguments for reform and the utility of the EPA.

== Letters ==
The EPA had many different letter systems, depending on the author. Below are two early examples.

=== 1843 ===
At this stage, long vowels had a cross-bar, and short vowels did not. There were also no lowercase letterforms; only capital forms were used.

Vowels
EPA	IPA	EPA	IPA
Ɨ	/iː/	I	/ɪ/
E	/eɪ/		/ɛ/
A	/ɑː/	Ʌ	/æ/ (Note: ⟨Ʌ⟩ may conceivably represent /a/ rather than /æ/ in dialects with the more open pronunciation.)
Ɵ	/ɔː/	O	/ɒ/
Ʉ	/oʊ/	U	/ʌ/
𝽼̶	/uː/	𝽼	/ʊ/
Ǝ	/ɜː/ (Note: The two forms of the "obscure vowel" are evidently ambiguous. The words a (article) and serve are written with ⟨Ǝ⟩, the words specimen and gladness are written with ⟨⟩, and the word the is written with both (in separate instances).)		/ə/
Semivowels
Y	/j/		
W	/w/		
Diphthongs (Note: The diphthong /ɔɪ/ did not have its own letter in this edition, but gains one in subsequent editions. Here it is written with ⟨OƗ⟩ in the word joyful and ⟨ƟƗ⟩ in the word noise.)
Ɯ (= I𝽼)	/iu/		
Ꟛ (= ɅI)	/aɪ/		
Ȣ (= O𝽼)	/aʊ/		

Consonants
EPA	IPA	EPA	IPA
P	/p/	B	/b/
T	/t/	D	/d/
𝽬	/tʃ/	J	/dʒ/
K	/k/	G	/ɡ/
F	/f/	V	/v/
Θ	/θ/	Δ	/ð/
S	/s/	Z	/z/
Ʃ	/ʃ/	Ʃ	/ʒ/
L	/l/		
R	/r/		
M	/m/		
N	/n/		
N	/ŋ/		
H	/h/		

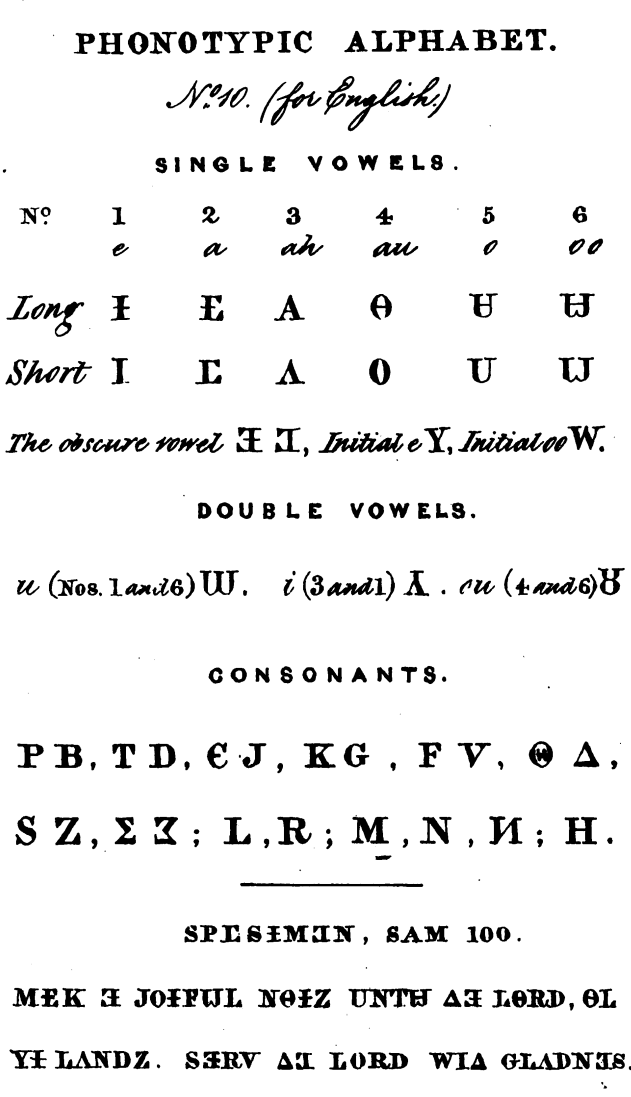
An early version of the alphabet (1843)

=== 1847 ===
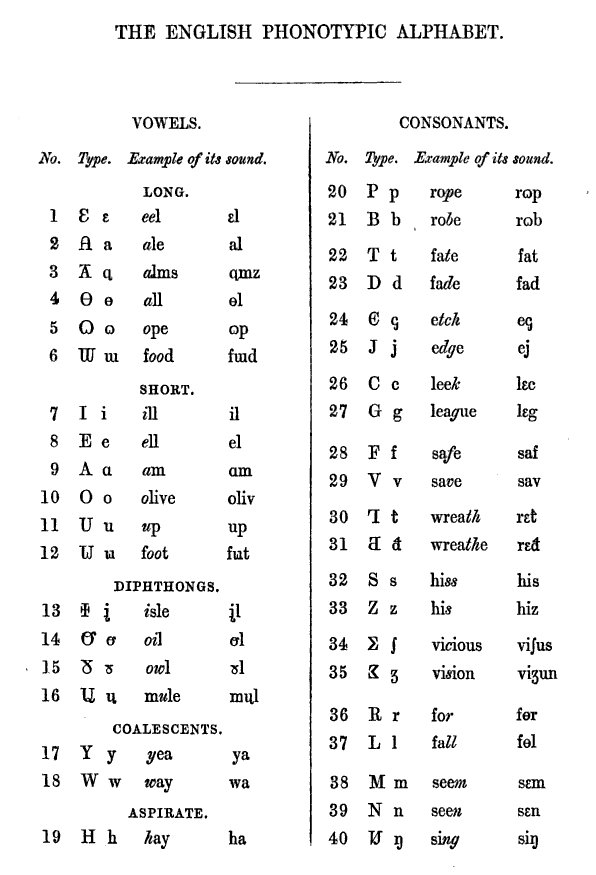
Letters of the English phonotypic Alphabet (1847)

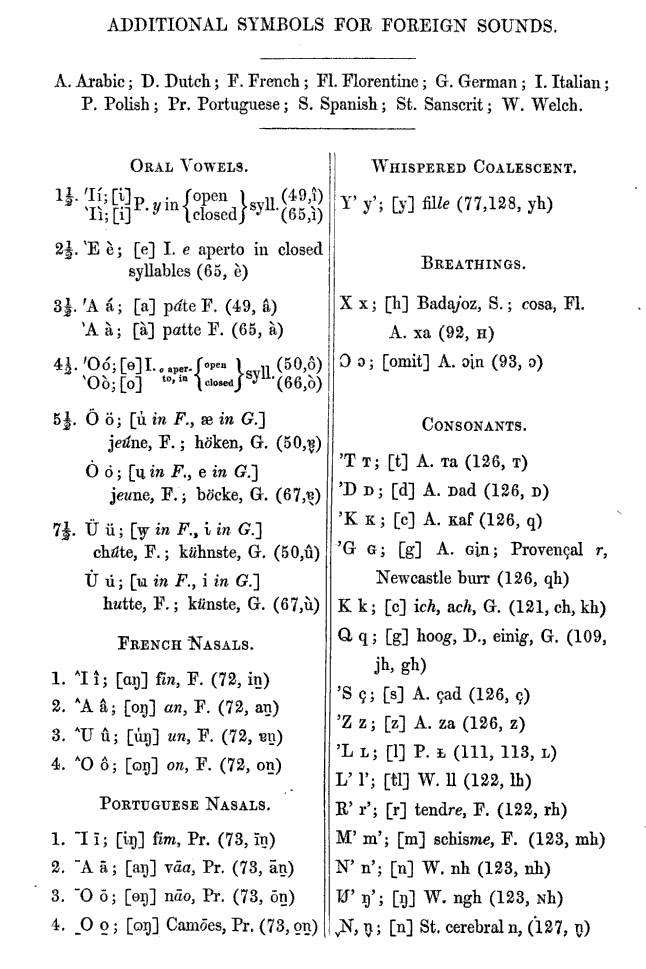
Additional letters for other languages (1845)

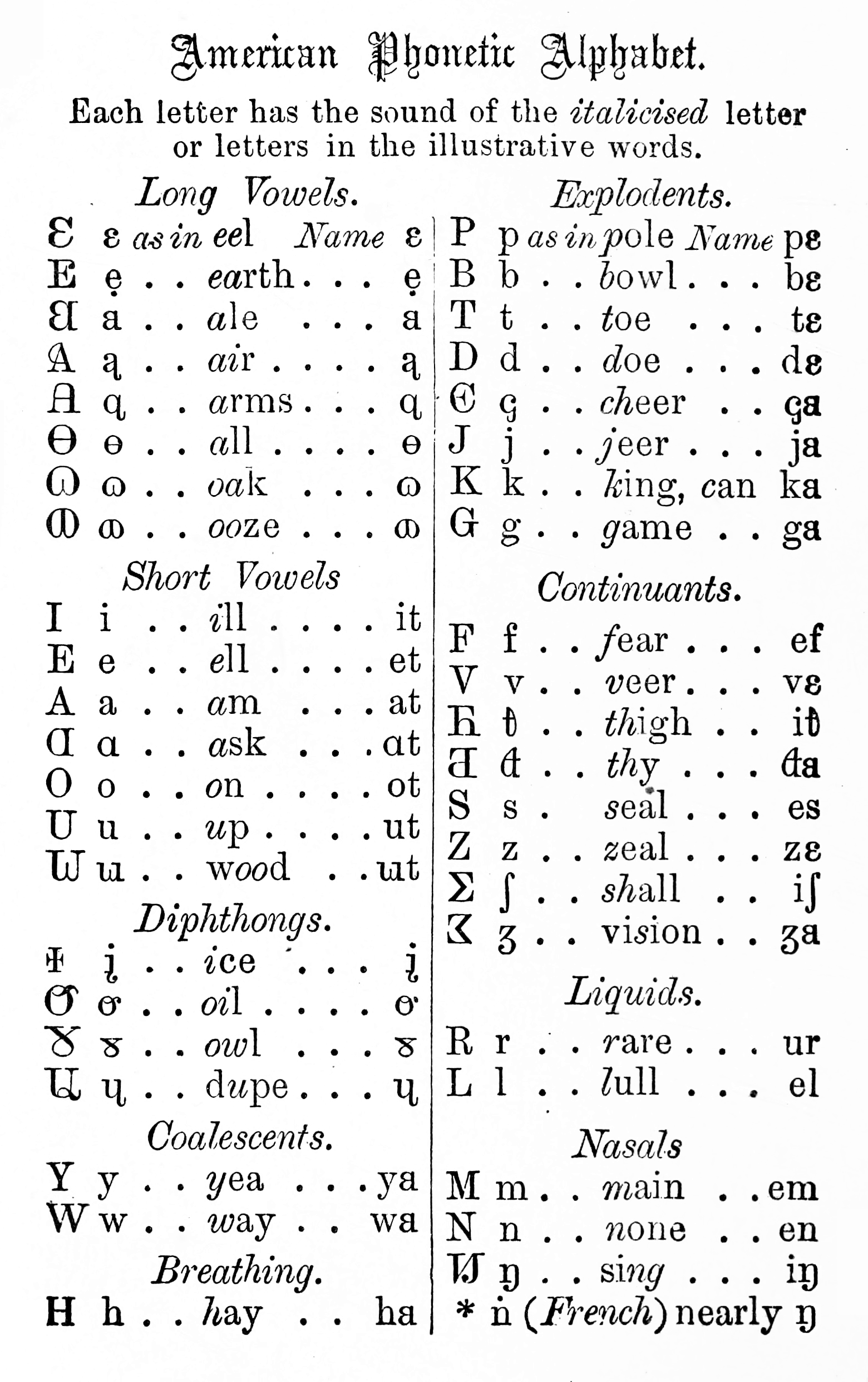
The American version of the alphabet (1855), as reprinted in a medical dictionary in 1871. The vowel letters evidently differ from the 1847 alphabet.

Monophthongs
	Front	Back	
Close	Ɛɛ		Ɯɯ
Near-close	Ii		𝽼𝽽
Open-mid	Ee	Uu	Oo
Near-open	Aɑ	𝾀ɋ	Ɵɵ

Diphthongs ending with an unrounded vowel
	Front	Back
Close-mid	𝽪a	
Near-open		𝽲𝽳
Open	𝽮𝽯	

Diphthongs ending with a rounded vowel
	Front	Back
Close	𝽺𝽻	
Close-mid		꟝ɷ
Open		

Consonants
		Labial				Coronal						Dorsal			Laryngeal
		Bilabial		Labiodental		Dental		Alveolar		Postalveolar		Palatal	Velar		Glottal
Nasal			Mm						Nn					ŋ	
Plosive		Pp	Bb					Tt	Dd				Cc	Gg	
Affricate	sibilant									𝽬ꞔ	Jj				
Fricative	sibilant							Ss	Zz	Σʃ	Σʒ				
Fricative	non-sibilant			Ff	Vv	Ꞁ	Ƌ								Hh
Approximant	median								Rr			Yy		Ww	
Approximant	lateral								Ll						

== Summary ==
=== Vowels ===
The 1844 and early versions are not supported by Unicode, nor is the variant published by Comstock until 1858. Other attested variants are as follows:

Keyword	IPA	1847, 1851	1854	1855	1856	1860, 1864
FLEECE	iː	Ɛɛ			𝽮𝽰	
FACE	eɪ	𝽪a	Ꞛꞛ		Ɛɛ	
PALM	ɑː	𝾀ɋ	𝽪ɋ		𝽪𝽫	
THOUGHT	ɔː	Ɵɵ			꟝ɷ	
GOAT	oʊ	꟝ɷ			𝽲𝽳	
GOOSE	uː	Ɯɯ		𝽴𝽵	Ɯɯ	
KIT	ɪ	Ii				
DRESS	ɛ	Ee				
TRAP	æ	Aɑ	Aa			
LOT	ɒ	Oo				
STRUT	ʌ	Uu			𝽾𝽿	Ȣȣ
FOOT	ʊ	𝽼𝽽			Uu	
PRICE	aɪ	𝽮𝽯			ei	
CHOICE	ɔɪ	𝽲𝽳			oi	ɷi
MOUTH	aʊ				ou	
YULE	juː	𝽺𝽻			iu	yɯ/yu/iɯ/iu
NURSE	ɜː(r)			𝾁ẹ + r		
SQUARE	ɛə(r)			𝽨𝽩 + r		

In 1855, Ɑɑ was provided for the short "ask" vowel. It was the usual way of writing the article "a", and was found in "abaft". It's not clear how it was supposed to be distinct from Aa for the TRAP vowel, which was found in "am" and "abash". It was also found as the first vowel in "articulate", whereas 𝽪ɋ was intended for the vowel of "arm".

There was a sequence ai/𝽫i in 1856 and 1860–64 for the diphthong in the word "aye"/"ay", as distinct from the vowel in "by".

Scots also had the letters ꬰ and 𝽷, as well as diacritics.

The New Testament was published in 1864 but used the 1855 alphabet, perhaps due to the length of time it took to typeset it.

=== Consonants ===
/θ ð ŋ/ were written with the same letters throughout – ⟨𝽹⟩, approx. ⟨đ⟩, and ⟨ŋ⟩ – though the forms varied somewhat.

The affricates however were reanalyzed. From 1847 to 1855, /ʃ ʒ/ and /tʃ dʒ/ were written ⟨ʃ ʒ⟩ and ⟨ꞔ j⟩, respectively. In 1856, these four letters were reduced to two, for ⟨c j⟩ and ⟨tc dj⟩, and in 1860 were changed to ⟨ꞔ j⟩ and ⟨tꞔ dj⟩.

== Teaching literacy ==
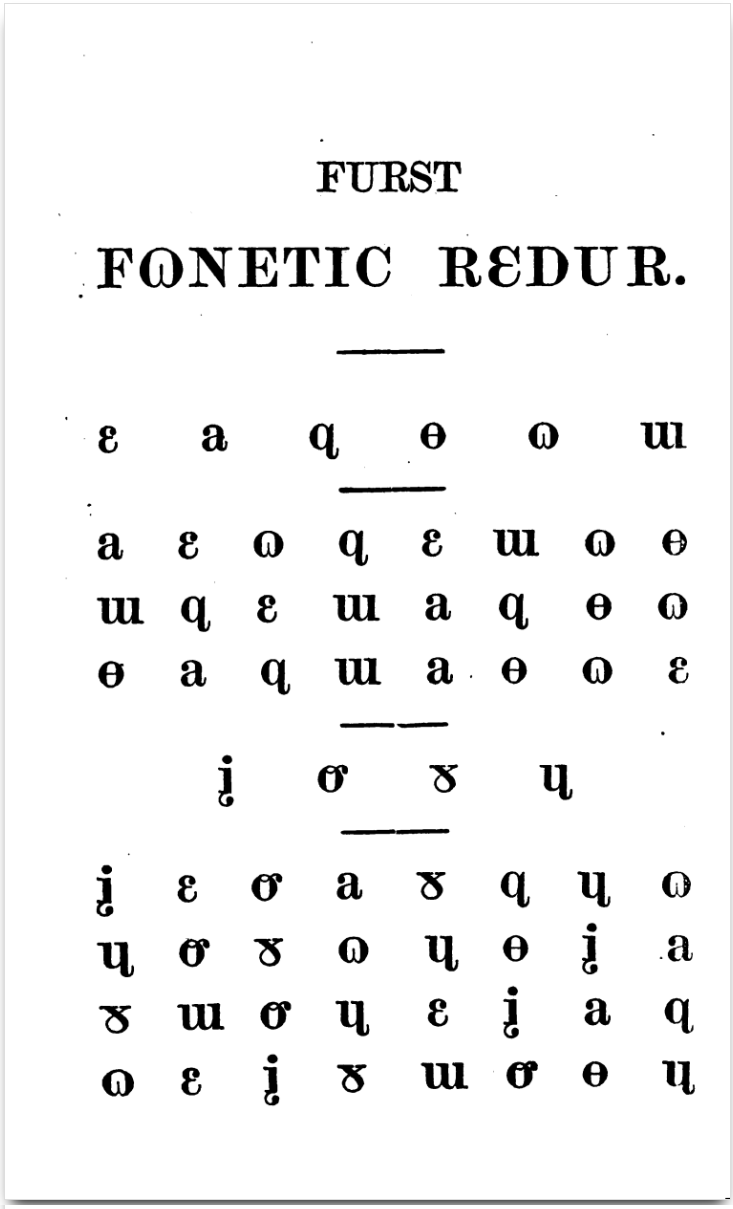
Vowels in the alphabet shown in Longley's First Phonetic Reader.

The ultimate objective of the EPA was to improve literacy levels; as such, to demonstrate its efficacy, it was trialled for teaching literacy in many different settings. It was mainly tried in schools with children but also illiterate inmates of workhouses, reformatories and jails and by missionaries in Africa, China & India. In 1849, its potential was shown when 1,300 Mancunian illiterates were taught to read and write in only a few months.

These trials culminated in the adoption of the EPA in two public school districts in the United States: Waltham, Massachusetts, between 1852–60 and Syracuse, New York, between 1850–66. Both districts used a variant of the EPA known as the Cincinnati Phonotypy or the American Phonetic Alphabet. This type was used by Longley Brothers to publish a set of reading-books: a first phonetic reader, a second phonetic reader, and a transition reader.

=== Waltham ===
In the 1852–53 annual report of Waltham's school committee, the chairman, Reverend Thomas Hill, reported the effect of learning the EPA on the 800 pupils within the ten schools:

It has been proved in repeated experiment that if a child upon his first learning his letters, is taught the Phonetic Alphabet, and is confined to Phonetic books for the first six to eight months of schooling, he will at the end of the first year's schooling read common print and spell in common spelling better than children will ordinarily do at the end of four or five year's instruction.

=== Syracuse ===
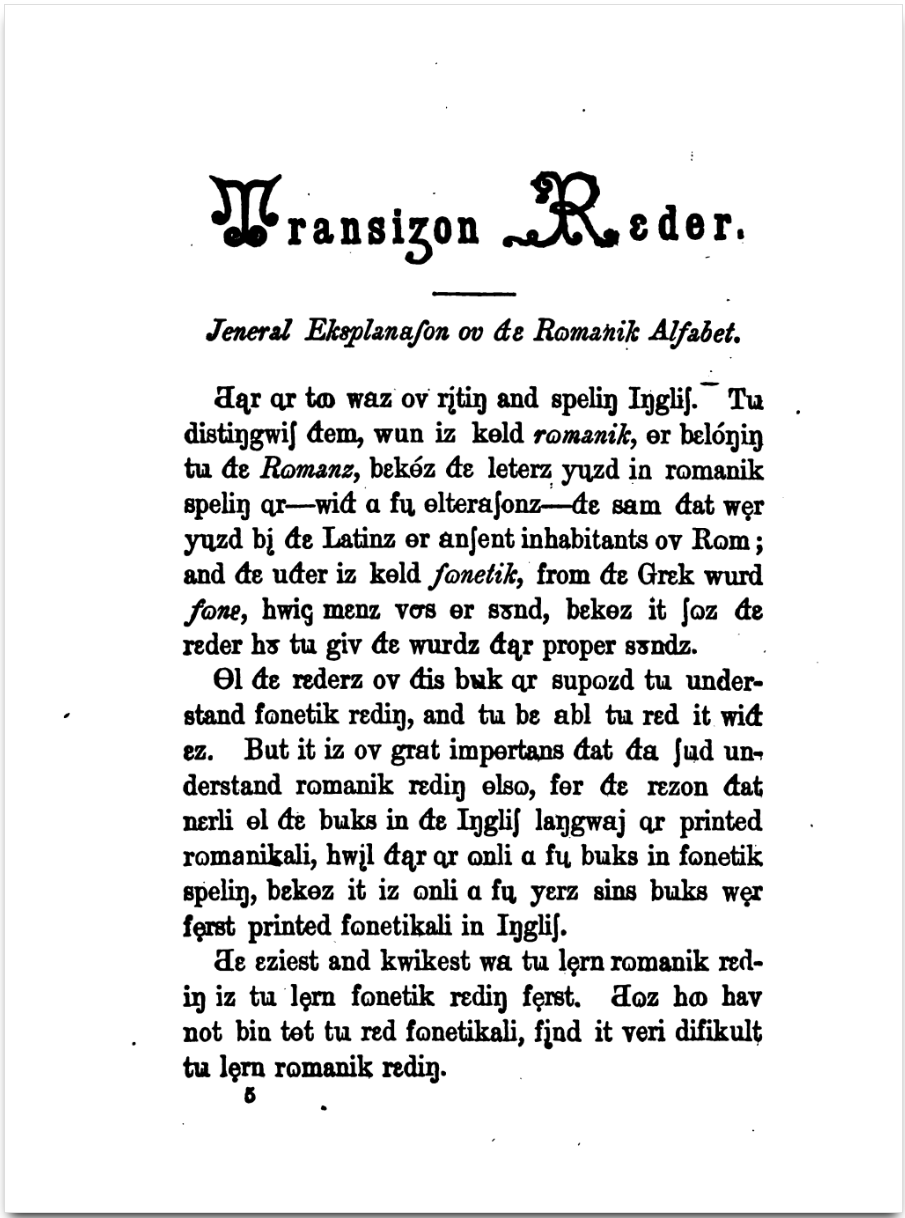
An introduction in Longley's Transition Reader explains the importance of literacy in both standard Roman script and phonetic script.

Bothe's analysis of the course of study for the Syracuse school district measured the improvement from using the EPA:

In 1855, before the introduction of the transitional alphabet, the student was expected to finish reading Webb's Second Reader by the end of the third grade. In 1858, the first year in which phonetic texts appeared in the course of study, Webb's Second Reader was entirely completed two-thirds through the second grade (four trimesters gained).

=== Leigh's Pronouncing Orthography ===
Edwin Leigh extensively practised using the EPA to teach literacy. He became persuaded of its efficacy and a passionate advocate but failed to convince his own St. Louis school district to adopt it. He concluded that the EPA was not widely accepted because parents, teachers, and district officials could not understand the orthography themselves. Leigh subsequently designed a spiritual successor system, Pronouncing Orthography, in an attempt to address some of these flaws.

== Unicode ==
Additional Unicode characters for EPA were encoded with the release of Unicode 18.0 in 2026:

- U+A7DD ꟝ LATIN CAPITAL LETTER CLOSED OMEGA
- U+1DF68 𝽨 LATIN CAPITAL LETTER PHONOTYPIC A WITH SWASH
- U+1DF69 𝽩 LATIN SMALL LETTER PHONOTYPIC A WITH SWASH
- U+1DF6A 𝽪 LATIN CAPITAL LETTER PHONOTYPIC ROUNDTOP A
- U+1DF6B 𝽫 LATIN SMALL LETTER PHONOTYPIC ROUNDTOP A
- U+1DF6C 𝽬 LATIN CAPITAL LETTER REVERSED SCRUPLE
- U+1DF6D 𝽭 LATIN SMALL LETTER REVERSED SCRUPLE
- U+1DF6E 𝽮 LATIN CAPITAL LETTER PHONOTYPIC DIPHTHONG AI
- U+1DF6F 𝽯 LATIN SMALL LETTER PHONOTYPIC DIPHTHONG AI
- U+1DF70 𝽰 LATIN SMALL LETTER I WITH PIGTAIL AT BOTTOM
- U+1DF71 𝽱 LATIN SMALL LETTER STRETCHED I
- U+1DF72 𝽲 LATIN CAPITAL LETTER O WITH CURL
- U+1DF73 𝽳 LATIN SMALL LETTER O WITH CURL
- U+1DF74 𝽴 LATIN CAPITAL LETTER CLOSED OMEGA WITH LONG STEM
- U+1DF75 𝽵 LATIN SMALL LETTER CLOSED OMEGA WITH LONG STEM
- U+1DF76 𝽶 LATIN CAPITAL LETTER TURNED CLOSED OMEGA
- U+1DF77 𝽷 LATIN SMALL LETTER TURNED CLOSED OMEGA
- U+1DF78 𝽸 LATIN CAPITAL LETTER PHONOTYPIC TH
- U+1DF79 𝽹 LATIN SMALL LETTER PHONOTYPIC TH
- U+1DF7A 𝽺 LATIN CAPITAL LETTER U WITH HOOK TAIL
- U+1DF7B 𝽻 LATIN SMALL LETTER U WITH HOOK TAIL
- U+1DF7C 𝽼 LATIN CAPITAL LETTER U WITH NOTCH AT BOTTOM
- U+1DF7D 𝽽 LATIN SMALL LETTER U WITH NOTCH AT BOTTOM
- U+1DF7E 𝽾 LATIN CAPITAL LETTER REVERSED U
- U+1DF7F 𝽿 LATIN SMALL LETTER REVERSED U
- U+1DF80 𝾀 LATIN CAPITAL LETTER A WITH TOPBAR
- U+1DF81 𝾁 LATIN CAPITAL LETTER E WITH BENT TOPBAR
- U+2E60 ⹠ WIGGLY EXCLAMATION MARK
- U+2E61 ⹡ INVERTED WIGGLY EXCLAMATION MARK
- U+2E62 ⹢ LEFT PARENTHESIS WITH MIDDLE RING
- U+2E63 ⹣ RIGHT PARENTHESIS WITH MIDDLE RING

== Bibliography ==
- Ellis, Alexander John (1848). Plea for Phonetic Spelling: or the Necessity of Orthographic Reform (2 ed.). London: Fred Pitman.
- Bothe, Albert (1 December 1967). Nineteenth-century experiments with transitional reading media (PDF) (Thesis). Baltimore: Johns Hopkins University.
- Hill, Thomas (1889). "A Way to Teach English Spelling". The Forum. 7 (2): 186–187 – via Internet Archive.
- Leigh, Edwin (1864), Pronouncing Orthography (PDF), pp. 1–13, archived from the original (PDF) on 2 July 2023
- Longley, Elias (1851a). First Phonetic Reader (4 ed.). Cincinnati: Longley Brothers.
- Longley, Elias (1851b). Second Phonetic Reader (1 ed.). Cincinnati: Longley Brothers.
- Longley, Elias (1855). Transition Reader (1 ed.). Cincinnati: Longley Brothers.
- Marshall, Fiona (1 July 2020). "History of the Philological Society: The Early Years" (PDF). philsoc.org.uk.
- Pitman, Sir James; St. John, John (1969). Alphabets and Reading, The Initial Teaching Alphabet (1 ed.). London: Pitman. ISBN 0-273-43343-1.
- Withers, George (2023) [1874]. The English Language Spelled as Pronounced (1 ed.). Frankfurt: Outlook. p. 73. ISBN 978-3-368-81052-8.

== See also ==
- Unifon
- Pronunciation respelling for English
