= En with descender =

Cyrillic letter used for /ŋ/ in various languages

- Ң ң

Usage
- Writing system: Cyrillic
- Type: Alphabetic
- Sound values: [ŋ]; [ɴ]; [ŋɡ]; [ŋk]

History
Development
I10
        - Ν ν
          - Н н
            - Ң ң

En with descender (Ң ң; italics: Ң ң) is a letter of the Cyrillic script. Its form is derived from the Cyrillic letter En (Н н) by adding a descender to the right leg.

It is used in several mostly Turkic languages to represent the voiced velar nasal /ŋ/, like the pronunciation of ⟨ng⟩ in "sing". In some cases, it also represents allophones of /ŋ/, most commonly the voiced uvular nasal /ɴ/.

The Cyrillic letter En with descender is romanized as ⟨ng⟩ or ⟨ñ⟩.

== Usage ==
The Cyrillic letter En with descender is used in the alphabets of the following languages:

Language	Name of letter	Sound
Bashkir	эң (eñ)	[ŋ~ɴ]
Dungan	ың (eng)	[ŋ]
Kalmyk	аң (añ)	[ŋ~ŋg~ŋk]
Karakalpak	эң (en')	[ŋ~ɴ]
Kazakh	ың (yñ)	[ŋ~ɴ]
Khakas	эң/ың	[ŋ]
Kyrgyz	ың	[ŋ~ɴ]
Shor	эң	[ŋ]
Tatar	эң (eñ)	[ŋ~ɴ]
Turkmen	эң (eň)	[ŋ]
Tuvan	эң	[ŋ]
Uyghur	әң (eng)	[ŋ~ɴ]

== Computing codes ==
Character information
Preview	Ң		ң	
Unicode name	CYRILLIC CAPITAL LETTER; EN WITH DESCENDER		CYRILLIC SMALL LETTER; EN WITH DESCENDER	
Encodings	decimal	hex	dec	hex
Unicode	1186	U+04A2	1187	U+04A3
UTF-8	210 162	D2 A2	210 163	D2 A3
Numeric character reference	&#1186;	&#x4A2;	&#1187;	&#x4A3;

== See also ==
- Ӊ ӊ : Cyrillic letter En with tail
- Ӈ ӈ : Cyrillic letter En with hook
- Ҥ ҥ : Cyrillic ligature En Ge
- Ñ ñ : Latin letter Ñ
- Ň ň : Latin letter Ň
- Ń ń : Latin letter Ń
- Ŋ ŋ : Latin letter Eng
- : Latin letter N with descender
- Cyrillic characters in Unicode
