= N with descender =

Letter of the Latin alphabet

- Ꞑ ꞑ
- (See below)

Usage
- Writing system: Latin script
- Type: Alphabetic
- Language of origin: Yañalif
- Sound values: [ŋ]

History
- Variations: (See below)

Other
- Writing direction: Left-to-Right

Ꞑ, ꞑ (N with descender) is a letter of the Latin alphabet, used in several New Turkic alphabet orthographies in 1930s (for instance, Tatar alphabet), as well as in the 1990s orthographies invented in attempts to restore the Latin alphabet for the Tatar language and the Chechen language.

In the majority of languages this letter represented a velar nasal (as in English singing).

Due to problems with the display of this letter in phones and computers, it is sometimes replaced by a similar letter Ŋ ŋ. Free fonts that display it correctly include Quivira, Gentium and Andika.

== History ==
The letter appeared in late 1920s in the New Turkic Alphabet, however it was borrowed by some other non-Turkic peoples of the Soviet Union during the Latinisation campaign. In the 1990s the letter was used in Chechen Latin alphabet, in 2000s it was used in the Tatar Latin alphabet, both of them however are not in wide use now. In the Chechen alphabet the majuscule looked similar to minuscule, but has a larger size.

== Unicode ==
In Unicode, the letter is in the Latin Extended-D block encoded at U+A790 Ꞑ LATIN CAPITAL LETTER N WITH DESCENDER and U+A791 ꞑ LATIN SMALL LETTER N WITH DESCENDER.

== See also ==
Similar Latin letters:

- Ŋ ŋ
- Ƞ ƞ
- Ɲ ɲ
- Ñ ñ
- Ň ň
- Ņ ņ
- ɳ
- ɱ
- ᶇ

Similar Cyrillic letters:

- Ӈ ӈ
- Ң ң
- Ӊ ӊ
- Ҥ ҥ
- Ԩ ԩ
