= Mansi alphabets =

Writing system used to write the Mansi languages

Mansi alphabets are writing systems used to write the Mansi languages. During its existence, it functioned on different graphic bases and was repeatedly reformed. At present day, the Mansi writing functions in Cyrillic. There are 3 stages in the history of Mansi writing:

- until the early 1930s, early attempts to create a written language based on the Cyrillic alphabet;
- 1931–1937 - writing on the Latin basis;
- since 1937 - modern writing based on the Cyrillic alphabet.

== Latin alphabet ==
In the 1920s, the process of Latinisation of scripts began in the USSR. As part of this project, in 1930-1931, a single Latinized northern alphabet was developed, which was to be used to create writing in the languages of the peoples of the North. According to the original draft, the Mansi alphabet was supposed to look like this: A a, Ç ç, E e, Ə ə, G g, Ƣ ƣ, H h, I i, J j, K k, L l, M m, N n, Ŋ ŋ, O o, P p, R r, S s, Ş ş, T t, U u, V v, W w, Ь ь.

However, in 1931, a slightly modified version of the Latinized Mansi alphabet was approved:

A a	B ʙ	C c	D d	E e	F f	G g	H h	Ꜧ ꜧ	I i
J j	K k	L l	Ļ ļ	M m	N n	Ņ ņ	Ŋ ŋ	O o	P p
R r	S s	Ꞩ ꞩ	T t	Ţ ţ	U u	V v	Z z	Ь ь

A sub-letter comma denoted palatalization. The length of the vowels was not displayed in the letter.

The first book in this alphabet was the primer "Iļpi ļoŋꜧh". It was followed by other literature, mainly children's and educational, and it also began to be used in the newspaper "Hantь-Maŋꞩi ꞩop" (Ugra news). The basis of the Mansi literary language was the Sosva dialect, which was spoken by more than 60% of the Mansi and which was the least subject to Russian influence.

== Modern alphabet ==
In 1937, the Mansi alphabet, like the alphabets of other peoples of the USSR, was translated into Cyrillic. This alphabet included all the letters of the Russian alphabet, as well as the digraph Нг нг, which was considered a separate letter. In the 1950s, the digraph Нг нг was replaced by the letter Ӈ ӈ. In 1979, at the suggestion of Evdokia Rombandeyeva, signs for long vowels were included in the Mansi alphabet (by adding a macron). Prior to that, in 1978, in the publication of Lenin’s brochure “The Tasks of Youth Unions”, an accent mark was used to indicate long vowels. This reform is considered one of the most successful for the writings of the peoples of the North.

Since then, the Mansi alphabet has not changed and now has the following form:

А а	А̄ а̄	Б б	В в	Г г	Д д	Е е	Е̄ е̄	Ё ё	Ё̄ ё̄	Ж ж
З з	И и	Ӣ ӣ	Й й	К к	Л л	М м	Н н	Ӈ ӈ	О о	О̄ о̄
П п	Р р	С с	Т т	У у	Ӯ ӯ	Ф ф	Х х	Ц ц	Ч ч	Ш ш
Щ щ	Ъ ъ	Ы ы	Ы̄ ы̄	Ь ь	Э э	Э̄ э̄	Ю ю	Ю̄ ю̄	Я я	Я̄ я̄

The letters Б б, Г г, Д д, Ж ж, З з, Ф ф, Ц ц, Ч ч, Ш ш are used only in borrowings.

== Correspondence chart ==
Modern Cyrillic	Latin (1931-1937)	IPA
А а, А̄ а̄	A a	/a/, /aː/
Б б	В в	/b/
В в	V v	/w/
Г г	G g, Ꜧ ꜧ	/g/, /ɣ/
Д д	D d	/d/
Е е, Е̄ е̄	E e, (Je je)	/e/, /je/
Ё ё, Ё̄ ё̄	(Jo jo)	/jo/
Ж ж	—	/ʒ/
З з	Z z	/z/
И и, Ӣ ӣ	I i	/i/
Й й	J j	/j/
К к	K k	/k/
Л л	L l	/l/
(Ль ль)	Ļ ļ	/lʲ/
М м	M m	/m/
Н н	N n	/n/
(Нь нь)	Ņ ņ	/nʲ/
Ӈ ӈ	Ŋ ŋ	/ŋ/
О о, О̄ о̄	O o	/o/, /oː/
П п	P p	/p/
Р р	R r	/r/
С с	S s	/s/
Т т	T t	/t/
(Ть ть)	Ţ ţ	/tʲ/
У у, Ӯ ӯ	U u	/u/, /uː/
Ф ф	F f	/f/
Х х	H h	/χ/
Ц ц	C c	/t͡s/
Ч ч	C c	/t͡ʃ/
Ш ш	—	/ʃ/
Щ щ	Ꞩ ꞩ	/ɕ/
ъ	-	/◌./
Ы ы	Ь ь	/ə/
ь	-	/◌ʲ/
Э э, Э̄ э̄	E e	/e/, /eː/
Ю ю, Ю̄ ю̄	(Ju ju)	/ju/
Я я, Я̄ я̄	(Ja ja)	/ja/
