= C with bar =

Additional letter of the Latin alphabet

- Ꞓ ꞓ

Usage
- Writing system: Latin script
- Type: Alphabetic
- Language of origin: Unified Northern Alphabet
- Sound values: [t͡ʃ] [t͡s]
- In Unicode: U+A792, U+A793

Ꞓ, minuscule: ꞓ, is a modified letter of the Latin script, formed from C with the addition of a bar. It was used in the final version of the Unified Northern Alphabet, approved in 1932 for Saami, Selkup, Khanty, Evenki, Even, Nanai, Udege, Chukchi, Koryak and Nivkh languages to denote the sound [t͡ʃ], although in some of these languages in practice, several other alphabets were used. Also, this letter was used in the Latinized Shugnan alphabet (1931-1939) to denote the sound [t͡s].

The United States Federal Geographic Data Committee uses the capital Ꞓ to represent the Cambrian Period in geologic history. In phonetic transcription, the lowercase ꞓ may denote a voiceless palatal fricative (IPA: [ç]), and in 1963, it was proposed as a symbol for a voiceless flat postalveolar fricative [ɻ̊˔] by William A. Smalley.

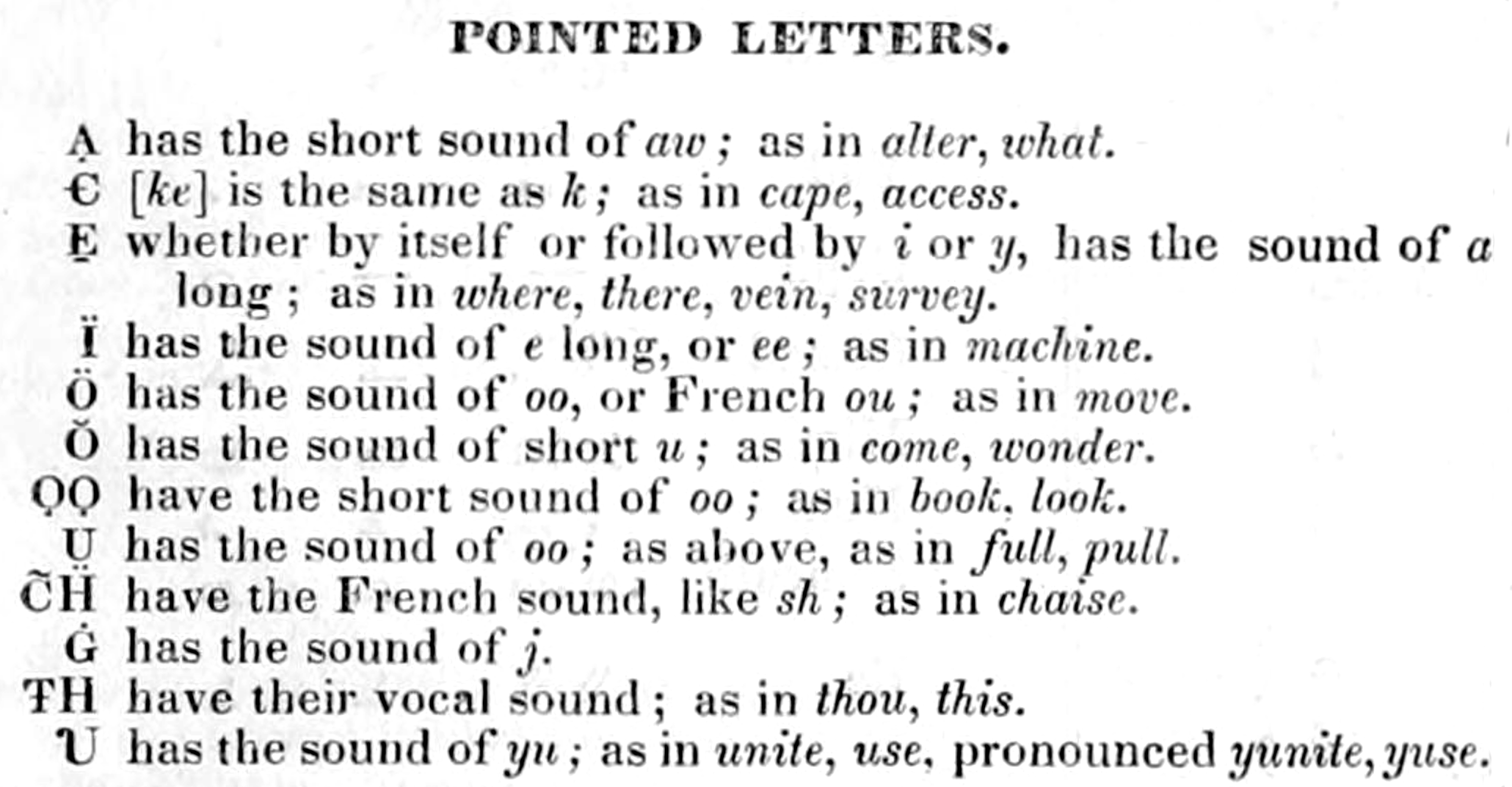
Pointed letters in Noah Webster's 1828 American dictionary of the English language, with ꞓ representing the letter 'c' when pronounced as a k.

In 19th-century American English dictionaries such as those by Noah Webster and William Holmes McGuffey, the letter was used to denote ⟨c⟩ pronounced as /k/.

In the old-fashioned Rousselot-Gilliéron phonetic notation, at the beginning of the 20th century, letter ꞓ used to represent the English sh-sound and the IPA [ʃ] sound.

== Computer encoding ==
Its Unicode codepoints are U+A792 Ꞓ LATIN CAPITAL LETTER C WITH BAR and U+A793 ꞓ LATIN SMALL LETTER C WITH BAR.

Character information
Preview	Ꞓ		ꞓ	
Unicode name	LATIN CAPITAL LETTER C WITH BAR		LATIN SMALL LETTER C WITH BAR	
Encodings	decimal	hex	dec	hex
Unicode	42898	U+A792	42899	U+A793
UTF-8	234 158 146	EA 9E 92	234 158 147	EA 9E 93
Numeric character reference	&#42898;	&#xA792;	&#42899;	&#xA793;

== See also ==
- Ukrainian Ye (Є є)
