= Extensions to the International Phonetic Alphabet (disambiguation) =

Extensions to the International Phonetic Alphabet refers to a set of letters and diacritics devised by the International Clinical Phonetics and Linguistics Association to augment the International Phonetic Alphabet for the phonetic transcription of disordered speech.

Other systems that are extensions to the IPA are:

- Sinological phonetic notation
- Voice Quality Symbols
- canIPA
- Any system/transcription using obsolete and nonstandard symbols
