= Letter value =

Letter value or value of the letter may refer to:

- Phonetic value of the letter
- Numeric value of a letter from the alphabet in some numeric systems
- Numeric value of a letter in Scrabble and some other word games
