= Cyrillic phonetic alphabets =

Phonetic alphabet used in Russian-speaking countries

There are several conventions for phonetic transcription using the Cyrillic script, typically augmented with Latin and Greek to fill in missing sounds. The details vary by author, and depend on which letters are available for the language of the text. For instance, in a work written in Ukrainian, ⟨г⟩ may be used for [ɣ] (the voiced equivalent of ⟨х⟩), whereas in Russian texts, ⟨г⟩ is used for [ɡ]. This article follows common Russian usage.

Authors differ, for example, in whether they transcribe the voiced fricatives with the South Slavic letters ⟨ѕ⟩ and ⟨џ⟩, with the ligatures ⟨ꚉ⟩ and ⟨ԫ⟩ (which are common in monolingual dictionaries), or as simple digraphs ⟨д͡з⟩ and ⟨д͡ж⟩. Latin w, l, k and h are commonly used for IPA [β ɫ q h], though q is also used with its IPA value instead of k. Greek φ and γ are commonly used for IPA [ɸ ɣ].

== Symbols ==
Parentheses mark alternative symbols.

Vowel letters
	Front		Central		Back
Close	и ү		ы ю		u у
		і v		η ұ	
Close-mid	е ө		ɪ ᴕ		є о
			я		
Open-mid	э ø		ᴁ ꭥ		ɘ ϙ
	ǝ ɷ		ɐ		
Open		а ω		ɑ w	

⟨Ѣ⟩ (or е̌) may be used for [и͡е] and ⟨Ѡ⟩ (or о̌) for [у͡о].

⟨ы̅⟩ here is a hack: the top line should connect the two parts of the letter together.

Consonant letters
	Bilabial	Labiodental	Dental	Alveolar	Postalveolar	Retroflex	Palatal	Velar	Uvular	Pharyngeal	Glottal
Plosive	п б	n δ		т д		m ɡ	k ƨ	к г	қ ӷ	ҡ Ꜭ	ґ
Nasal	м	ꙧ		н		ӈ	њ	ҥ	ң		
Sibilant affricate				ц ѕ	ч џ	ɥ ψ	ћ ђ				
Sibilant fricative				с з	ш ж	ɯ ӿ	щ җ				
Fricative	φ β f	ф в	θ ð d	ʀ ᴘ		ꭆ ϱ	ꭓ ɣ	х ғ ґ	ӽ ӻ	ӄ ҕ	һ ꜧ
Approximant	ł	ʋ		r		ɽ	j	ŋ	ƒ	ɧ	ƕ
Trill	ꞗ b			ꝓ р					ꝙ q	ʞ ⁊	
Tap/Flap		ϐ		ƿ		ƍ					
Lateral affricate				σ z		ꞔ ʒ					
Lateral fricative				Ꙉ ⅄		ƛ λ					
Lateral approximant				л		ʌ	љ	ꙥ	ԯ		
Lateral flap				ɲ							
Click	ϝ	ꝩ	ꝉ	ỻ		ͳ	ꙓ				
Lateral click				π							
X-ization	ᴌ	ᴜ	ᴚ	ɹ	ɺ	ɻ	ь	ъ	ʁ	ҍ	!

Common diacritics
[сꚝ] or [сʼ] palatalized
[с·] not palatalized
[с°] labialized
[с̣] retroflex
[т̪] laminal
[т̯] apical (same as non-syllabic)
[т̇] alveolarized?
[и̇] pharyngealized

[а́] stress
[с꞉] or [с̄] long
[ӑ] short
[д͡ж] or [о͡у] affricate or diphthong
[т͕] unreleased plosive
[л̭] voiceless
[w̬] voiced
[и̃] nasalized
[л̥] syllabic
[и̯] non-syllabic (same as apical)

[о̜] or [о̨] open
[о̹] (or reversed ogonek) close
[о꭪] fronted (diacritic often placed over the letter)
[э꭫] backed (diacritic often placed over the letter)
[ӓ] advanced/fronted and raised
[а·] fronted off-glide
[·а] fronted on-glide or following a non-palatalized consonant
[аᵊ] diphthongal off-glide or centralized

ӏ (ejective)

ʖ (implosive)

' (aspirated)

° (susumated)

*(laryngealized)

e.g. й ᾰ ы̄ а̄ ƣ ұꞁ яꞁ ⱶє ⱶɘ ü ӭ
