= ARPABET =

Phonetic notation

ARPABET (also spelled ARPAbet) is a set of phonetic transcription codes developed by Advanced Research Projects Agency (ARPA) as a part of their Speech Understanding Research project in the 1970s. It represents phonemes and allophones of General American English with distinct sequences of ASCII characters. Two systems, one representing each segment with one character (alternating upper- and lower-case letters) and the other with one or two (case-insensitive), were devised, the latter being far more widely adopted.

ARPABET has been used in several speech synthesizers, including Computalker for the S-100 system, SAM (Software Automatic Mouth) for the Atari 8-bit computers and Commodore 64, the Say utility shipped with the Amiga, TextAssist for the PC and Speakeasy from Intelligent Artefacts which used the Votrax SC-01 speech synthesiser IC. It is also used in the CMU Pronouncing Dictionary. A revised version of ARPABET is used in the TIMIT corpus.

== Symbols ==
Stress is indicated by a digit immediately following a vowel. Auxiliary symbols are identical in 1- and 2-letter codes. In 2-letter notation, segments are separated by a space.

Vowels
ARPABET		IPA	Example(s)
1-letter	2-letter	IPA	Example(s)
a	AA	ɑ~ɒ	balm, bot (with father–bother merger)
@	AE	æ	bat
A	AH	ʌ	buck
c	AO	ɔ	caught, story
W	AW	aʊ	bout
x	AX	ə	comma
—N/a	AXR	ɚ	letter, forward
Y	AY	aɪ	bite
E	EH	ɛ	bet
R	ER	ɝ	bird, foreword
e	EY	eɪ	bait
I	IH	ɪ	bit
X	IX	ɨ	roses, rabbit
i	IY	i	beat
o	OW	oʊ	boat
O	OY	ɔɪ	boy
U	UH	ʊ	book
u	UW	u	boot
—N/a	UX	ʉ	dude

Consonants
ARPABET		IPA	Example
1-letter	2-letter	IPA	Example
b	B	b	buy
C	CH	tʃ	China
d	D	d	die
D	DH	ð	thy
F	DX	ɾ	butter
L	EL	l̩	bottle
M	EM	m̩	rhythm
N	EN	n̩	button
f	F	f	fight
g	G	ɡ	guy
h	HH or H	h	high
J	JH	dʒ	jive
k	K	k	kite
l	L	l	lie
m	M	m	my
n	N	n	nigh
G	NX or NG	ŋ	sing
—N/a	NX	ɾ̃	winter
p	P	p	pie
Q	Q	ʔ	uh-oh
r	R	ɹ	rye
s	S	s	sigh
S	SH	ʃ	shy
t	T	t	tie
T	TH	θ	thigh
v	V	v	vie
w	W	w	wise
H	WH	ʍ	why (without wine–whine merger)
y	Y	j	yacht
z	Z	z	zoo
Z	ZH	ʒ	pleasure

Stress and auxiliary symbols
AB	Description
0	No stress
1	Primary stress
2	Secondary stress
3...	Tertiary and further stress
-	Silence
!	Non-speech segment
+	Morpheme boundary
/	Word boundary
#	Utterance boundary
:	Tone group boundary
:1 or .	Falling or declining juncture
:2 or ?	Rising or internal juncture
:3 or .	Fall-rise or non-terminal juncture

=== TIMIT ===
In TIMIT, the following symbols are used in addition to the ones listed above:

Symbol	IPA	Example	Description
AX-H	ə̥	suspect	Devoiced /ə/
BCL	b̚	obtain	[b] closure
DCL	d̚	width	[d] closure
ENG	ŋ̍	Washington	Syllabic [ŋ]
GCL	ɡ̚	dogtooth	[ɡ] closure
HV	ɦ	ahead	Voiced /h/
KCL	k̚	doctor	[k] closure
PCL	p̚	accept	[p] closure
TCL	t̚	catnip	[t] closure
PAU	—N/a	—N/a	Pause
EPI	—N/a	—N/a	Epenthetic silence
H#	—N/a	—N/a	Begin/end marker

== See also ==
- Comparison of ASCII encodings of the International Phonetic Alphabet
- SAMPA, language-specific
- X-SAMPA, encoding the whole International Phonetic Alphabet
- Pronunciation respelling for English
