= I with bowl =

Letter of the Latin alphabet used for historical orthography of Jaꞑalif

Usage
- Writing system: Latin script
- Type: Alphabetic
- Language of origin: Yañalif
- Sound values: [ɨ]; [ɯ]; [ɤ]

Other
- Writing direction: Left-to-Right

Latin yeru or I with bowl (approximated in Unicode with the Cyrillic soft sign ⟨Ь ь⟩) is an additional letter of the Latin alphabet. It was introduced in 1928 into the reformed Yañalif, and later into other alphabets for Soviet minority languages. The letter was created to represent the non-front close unrounded vowel sounds [ɨ] and [ɯ]; thus, this letter corresponds to the letter ⟨I ı⟩ in modern Turkic alphabets, and the letter yery (⟨Ы ы⟩) in Cyrillic.

== Usage ==
The letter was originally included in the Yañalif, and later also in the alphabets of the Kurdish, Abaza, Sami, Ingrian, Kalmyk, Komi, Tsakhur, Azerbaijani, Bashkir and Suret languages, as well as in the draft reform of the Udmurt alphabet. During the project of the Latinization of the Russian language, this letter corresponded to the Cyrillic letter ⟨Ы ы⟩. In Kalmyk, however, it represented palatalisation of the preceding consonant, thus corresponding to the Cyrillic homoglyph ⟨Ь ь⟩. In Suret (Assyrian), this letter represented the mid central vowel (ə), like in the word ьsra (ten).

In languages and alphabets that used this letter, small capital ⟨ʙ⟩ was often used for the lowercase form of B, so that there would be no confusion between ⟨b⟩ and ⟨ь⟩.

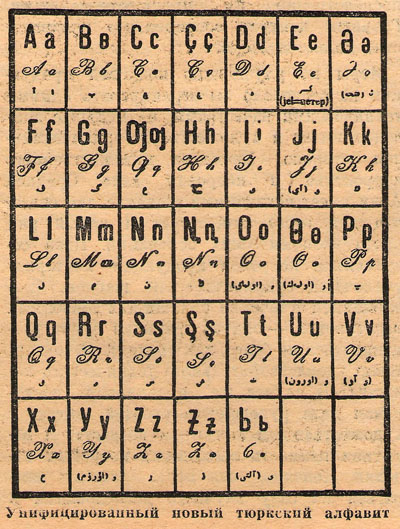
New Turkic alphabet (Yañalif)

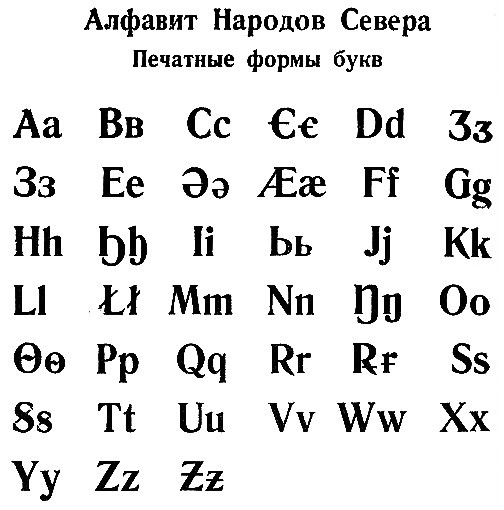
The Latin-based Unified Northern Alphabet

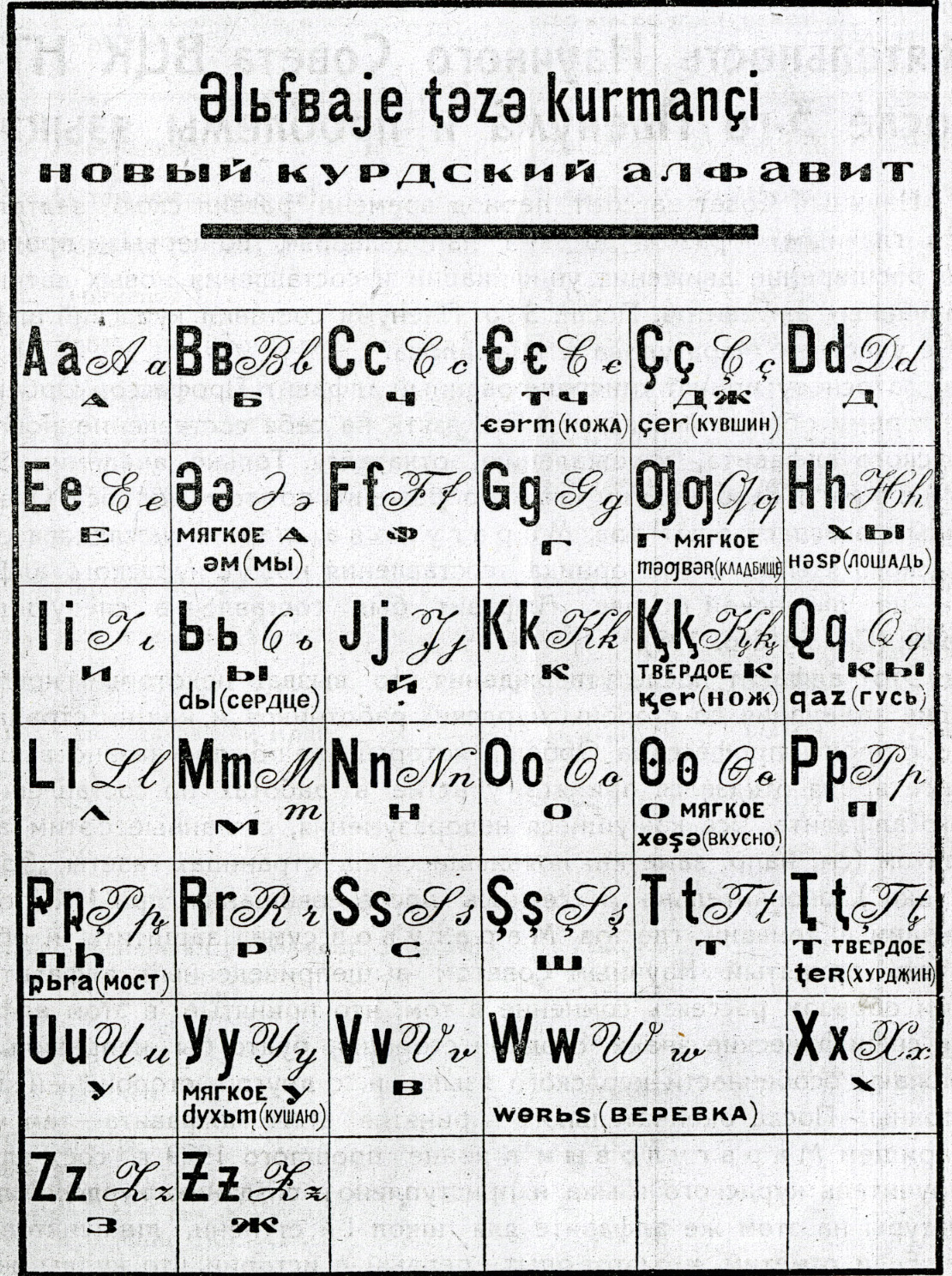
Kurdish alphabet of 1929

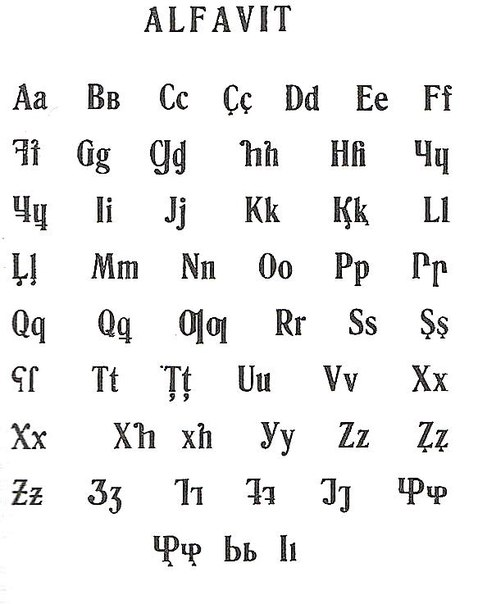
Abaza alphabet of the 1930s

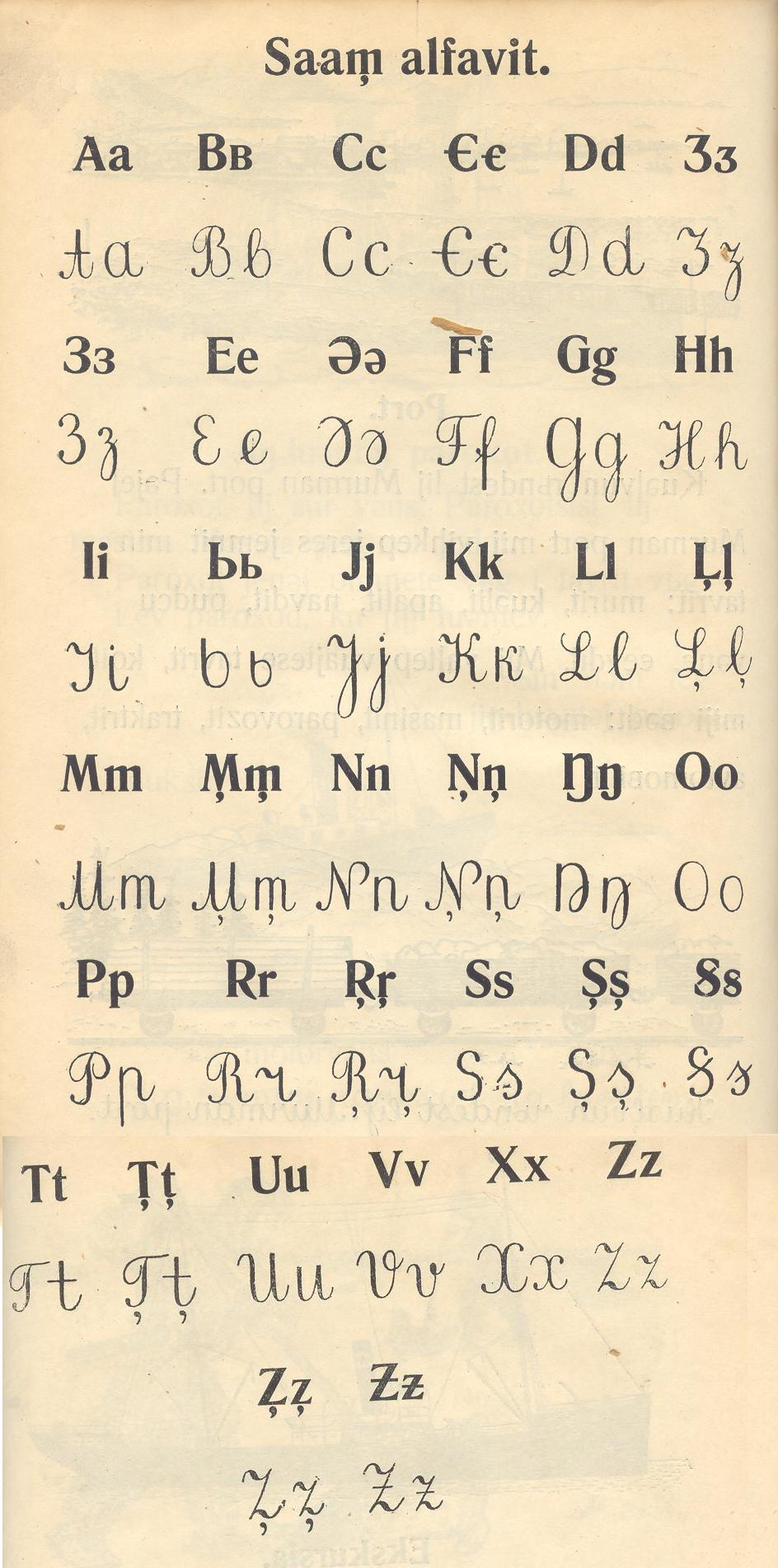
Sami alphabet of 1933

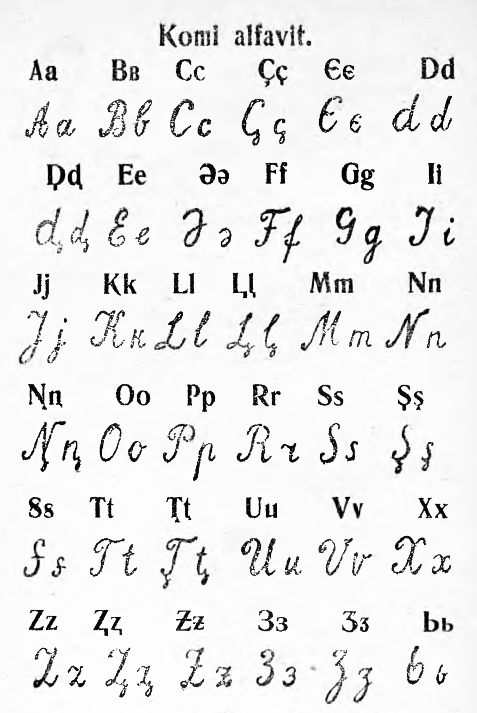
Komi alphabet of 1934

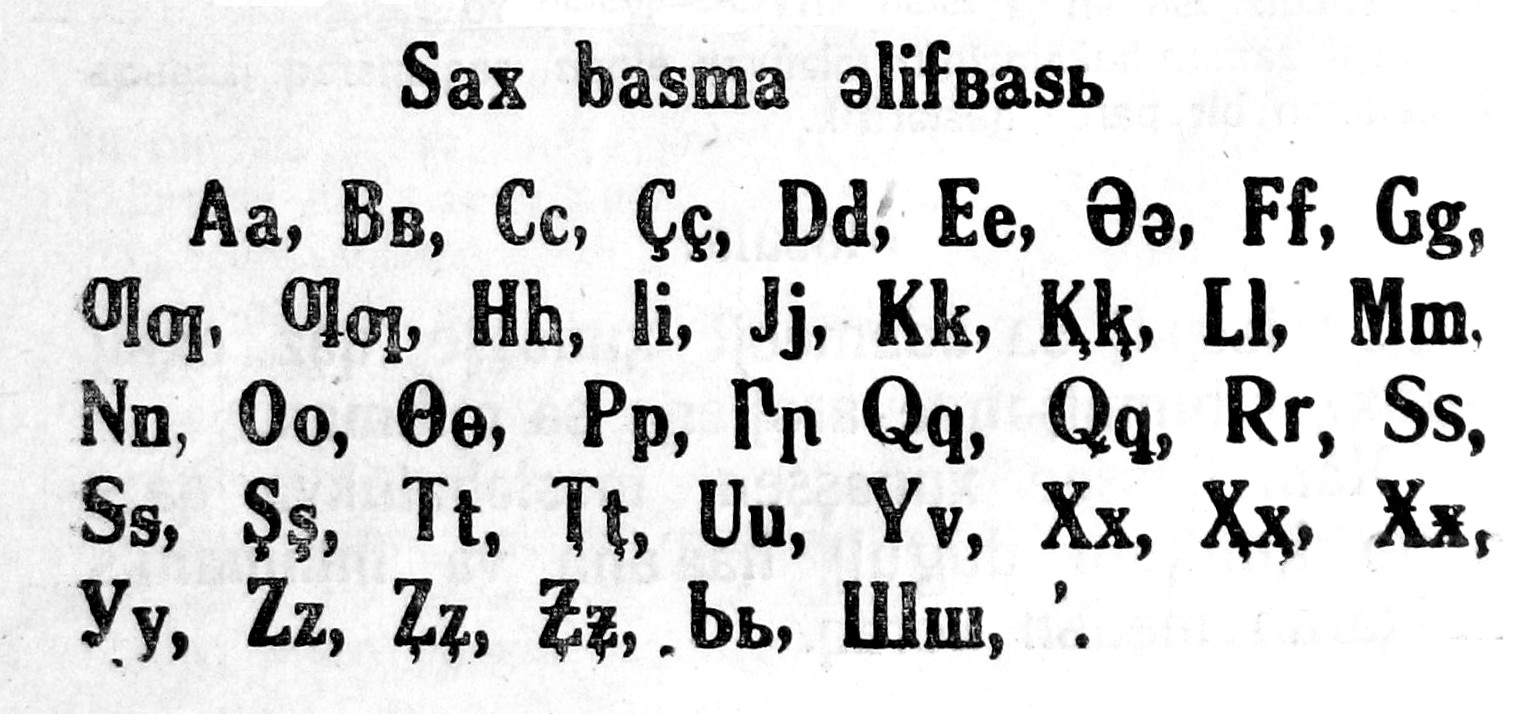
Tsakhur alphabet of 1934

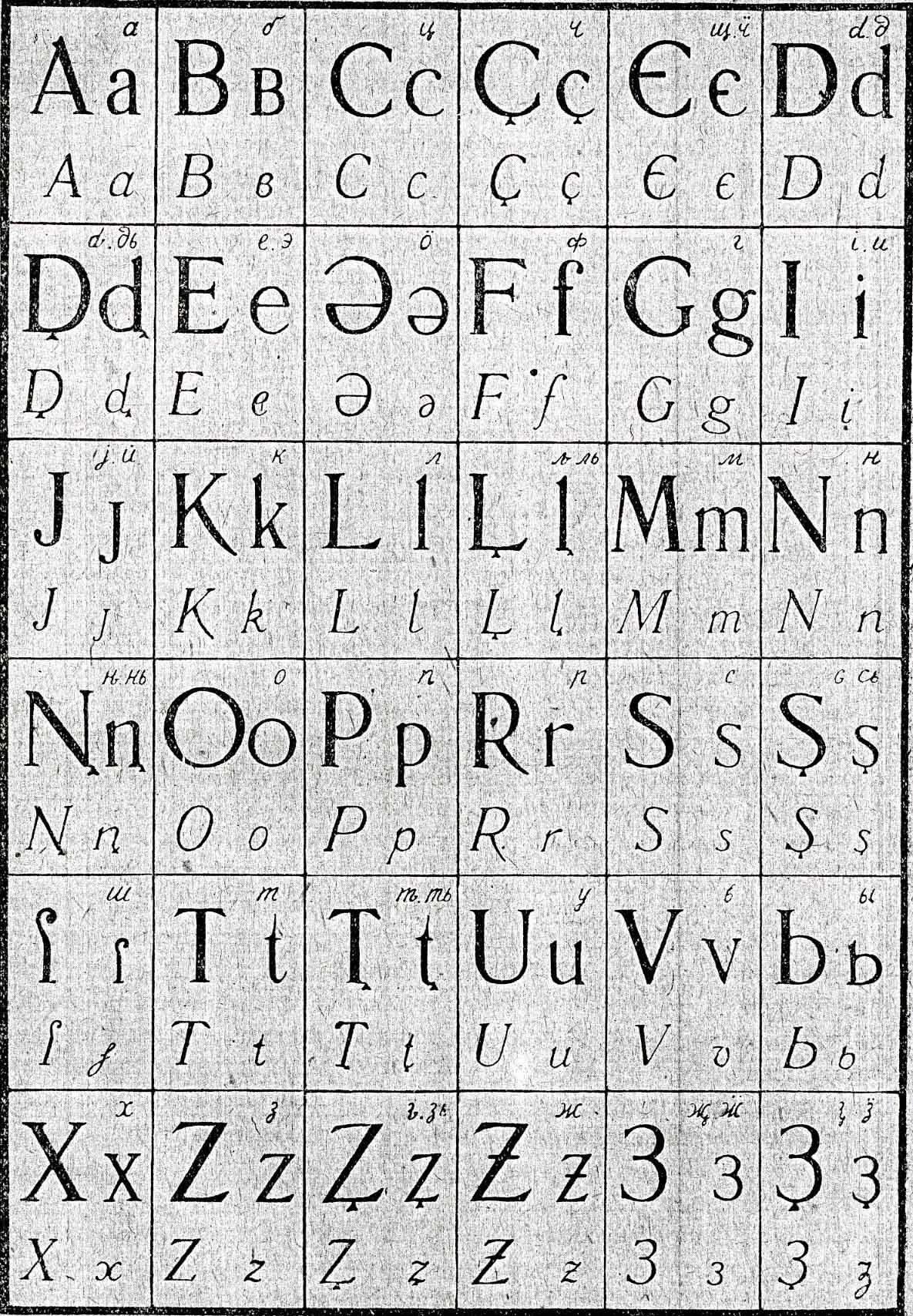
The draft reform of the Udmurt and Komi scripts of 1931

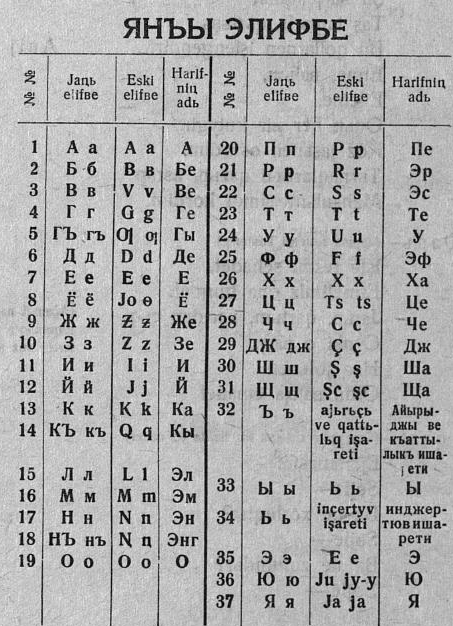
Crimean Tatar alphabet from the 1920s, with the Latin script in the middle columns.

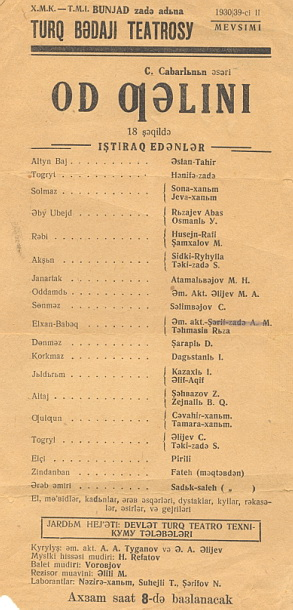
Table of contents, on a book, showing the use of Ь in some words.

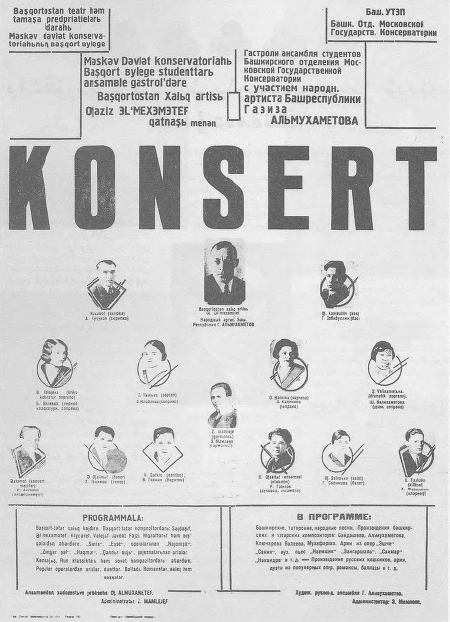
Tour poster showing the promo of a state conservery, I with bowl can be seen.

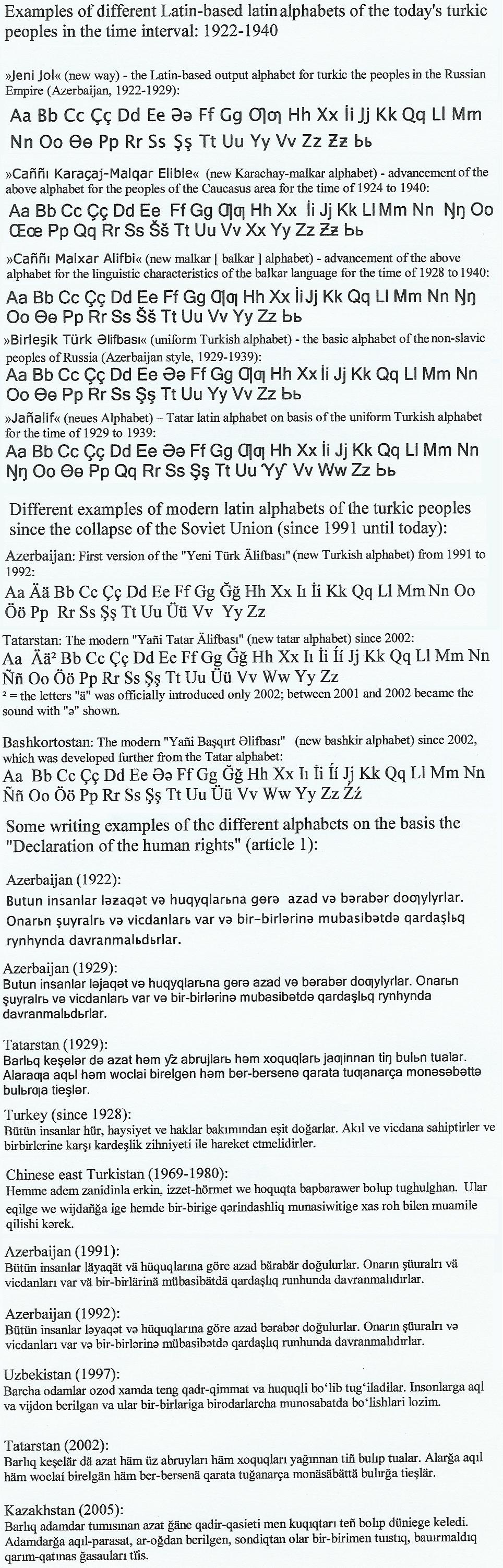
Comparison of the New Turkic alphabets, as well as examples of sentences.

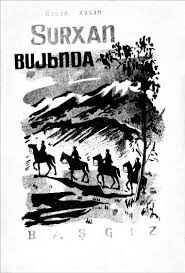
Book cover, whose title translates to "On Surkhan," shows the use of the letter in the word "Bujьnda."

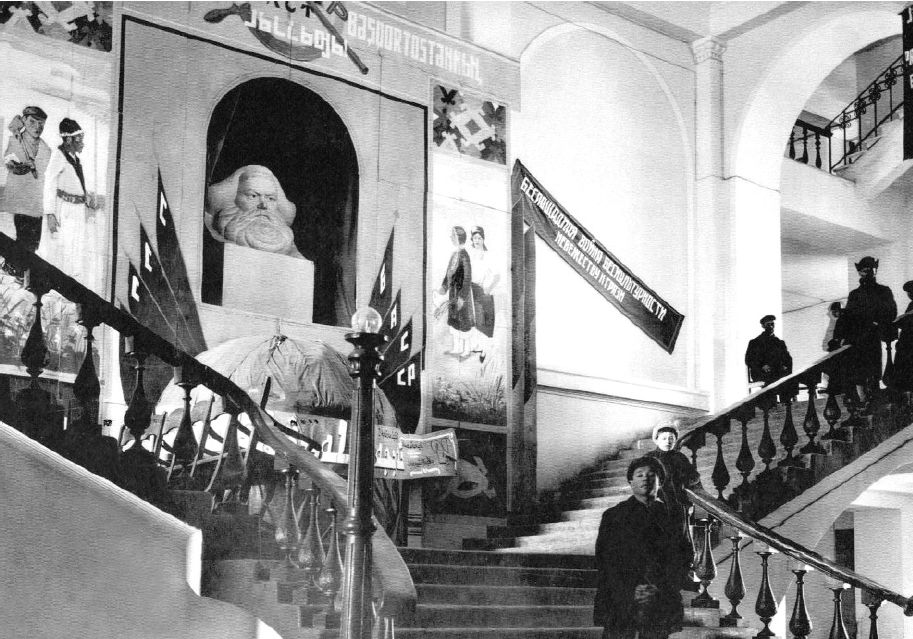
Wall sign at the Bashkir Opera and Ballet Theatre in Bashkortostan; notice the I with bowl is barely visible at the top of it.

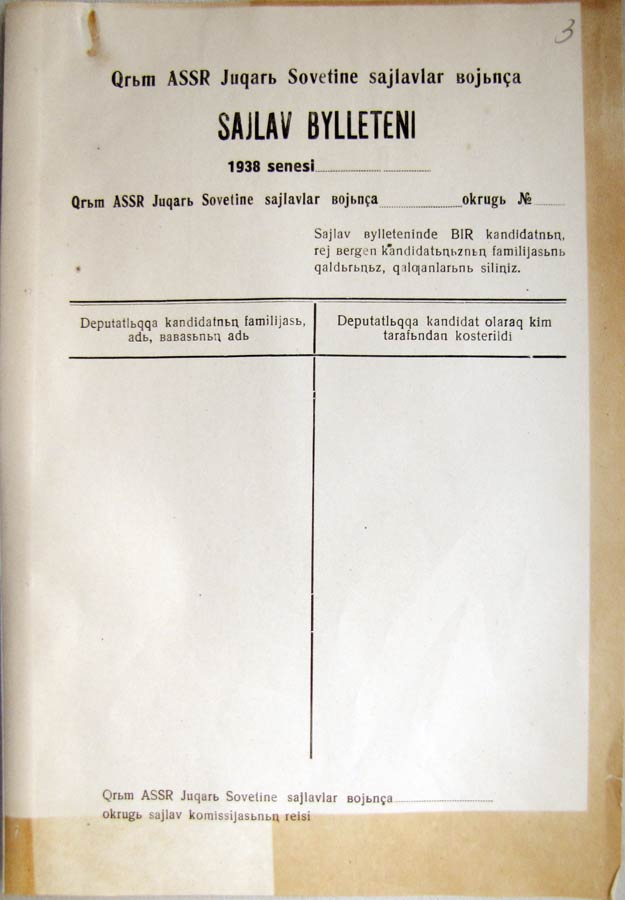
Sample ballot in Crimean Tatar for voting elections to the Supreme Soviet of the Crimean ASSR in 1938.

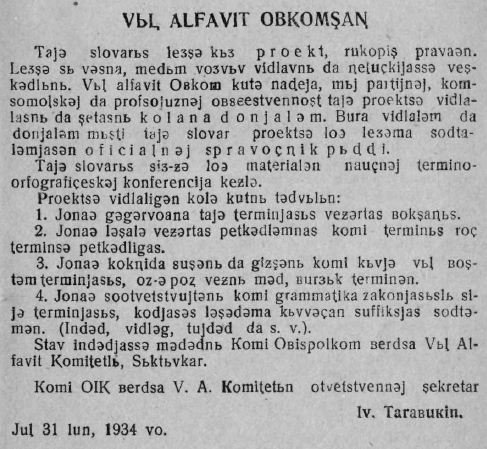
Examples of sentences in Latin-script Komi.

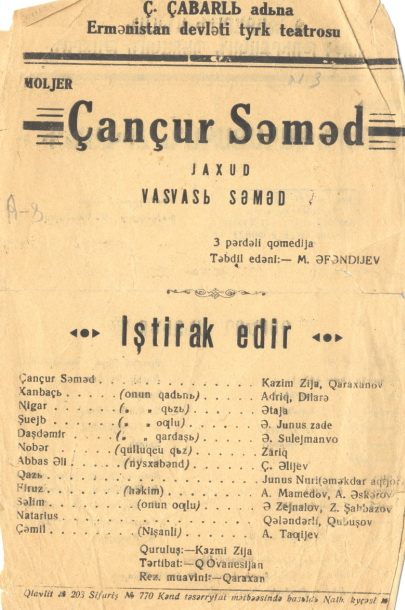
Janjur Saman theatrical play poster

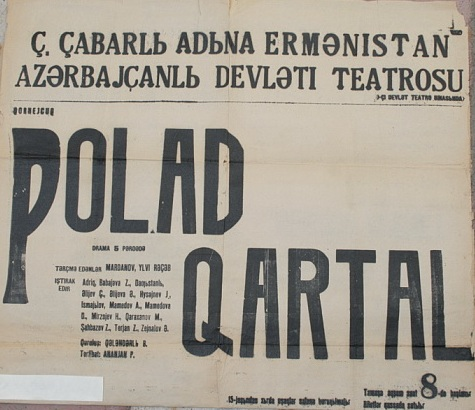
Yerevan State poster for the opera show at an Azerbaijani theatre.

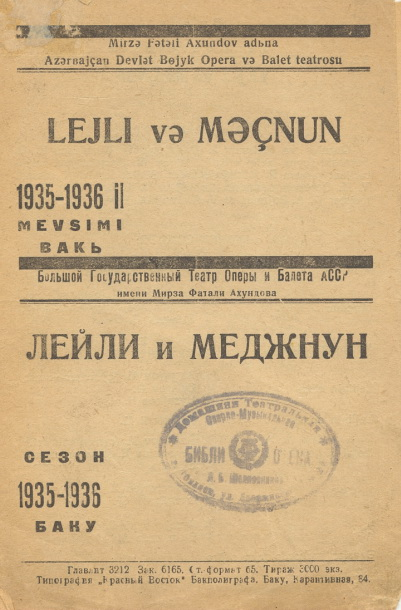
Poster of Leyli and Majnun, with Latin-script on top section.

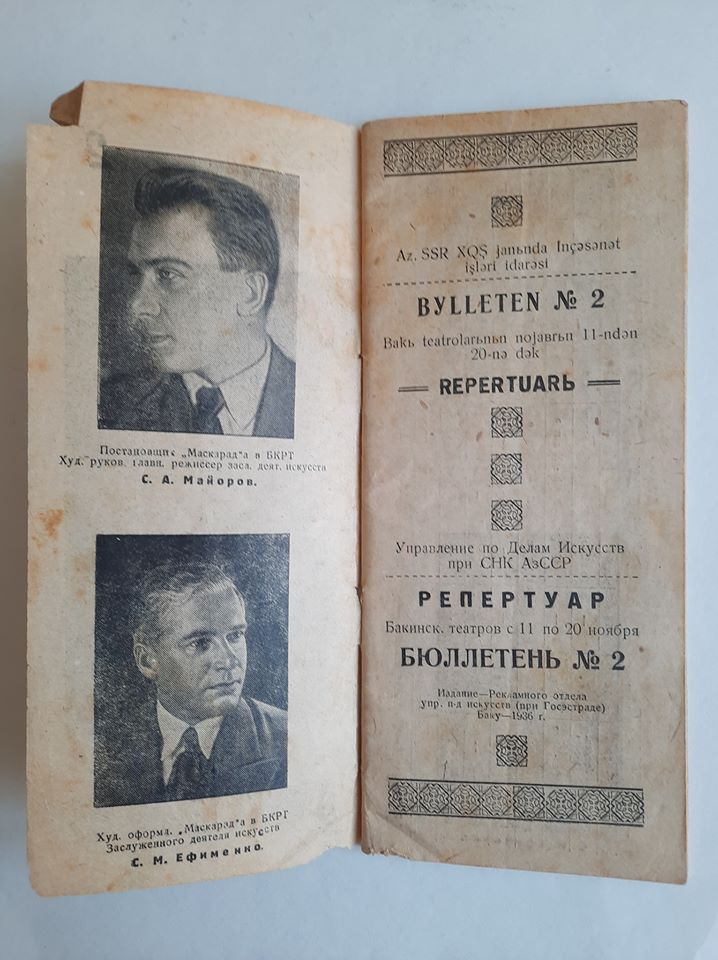
1936 bulletin about Baku theatres.

Emblem of Azerbaijani SSR from 1937-1940. I with bowl is found in the words "Respuʙliqasь" and "Proletarlarь."

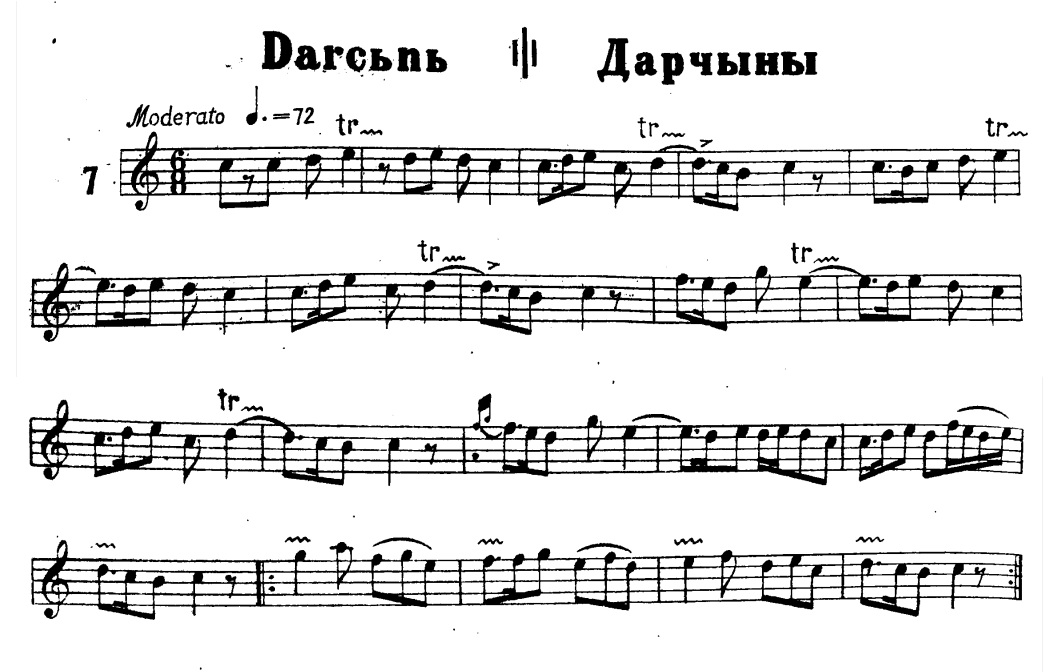
Azerbaijani dance melody sheet for Darçını. The letter can be seen in the title written in Latin script.

== Unicode ==
In Unicode, it is recommended to employ the Cyrillic characters for the early Soviet Latin characters, if they have similar ones in Cyrillic. Thus, Cyrillic ⟨Ь ь⟩ should be used for this letter.

== See also ==
- Latinisation in the Soviet Union
