= Comparison of ASCII encodings of the International Phonetic Alphabet =

The International Phonetic Alphabet (IPA) consists of more than 100 letters and diacritics. Before Unicode became widely available, several ASCII-based encoding systems of the IPA were proposed. The alphabet went through a large revision at the Kiel Convention of 1989, and the vowel symbols again in 1993. Systems devised before these revisions inevitably lack support for the additions they introduced.

Only language-neutral systems are discussed below because language-dependent ones (such as ARPABET) do not allow for a systematic comparison.

== General information ==
System	Author(s)	Created	Last updated	Note	Ref
Branner (unnamed)	David Prager Branner at the University of Washington	1994	?		
Millar & Oasa (unnamed)	J. Bruce Millar and Hiroaki Oasa at Australian National University	1981	1981		
PHONASCII	George D. Allen at Purdue University	1988	1988	Not a direct mapping of the IPA. Segments are separated by spaces, and diacritics by commas.	
Praat	Paul Boersma and David Weenink at the University of Amsterdam	1992	2025	A subset of a larger set of backslash trigraphs also comprising international and mathematical characters. The symbols can be typed in ASCII but will be visualized as the normal Unicode glyphs.	
IPA (SIL) Keyboard	SIL International	1994	2021		
UCLA Phonological Segment Inventory Database (UPSID)	Ian Maddieson at the University of California, Los Angeles	1984	?	Presented here is the scheme used for representing phonemes in the database of phonological inventories. Consequently, it is not designed for transcription of multiple segments and does not have symbols for values not found phonemically in the languages sampled.	
Usenet ASCII-IPA transcription	Participants in sci.lang and alt.usage.english newsgroups (later maintained by Evan Kirshenbaum at HP Labs)	1991	2011	Also known variously as "ASCII-IPA", "Kirshenbaum", etc. IETF language subtags register fonkirsh to identify text in this convention.	
Worldbet	James L. Hieronymus at AT&T Bell Laboratories	1994	1994	Segments are separated by spaces.	
X-SAMPA	John C. Wells at University College London	1995	2000	IETF language subtags register fonxsamp to identify text in this convention.	

== Symbols ==
Only the symbols in the latest IPA chart are included. The numbers in the leftmost column, according to which the symbols are sorted, are the IPA Numbers. Some of the IPA symbols to which a system lacks a corresponding symbol may still be represented in that system by use of a modifier (diacritic), but such combinations are not included unless the documentation explicitly assigns one for the value.

#	IPA	Branner	M&O	PHONASCII	Praat	SIL	UPSID	Usenet	Worldbet	X-SAMPA	Value
101	p	p	p	p	p	p	p	p	p	p	Voiceless bilabial plosive
102	b	b	b	b	b	b	b	b	b	b	Voiced bilabial plosive
103	t	t	t	t	t	t	t	t	t	t	Voiceless alveolar plosive
104	d	d	d	d	d	d	d	d	d	d	Voiced alveolar plosive
105	ʈ	tr)	t(	tr	\t.	t<	t.	t.	tr	t`	Voiceless retroflex plosive
106	ɖ	dr)	d(	dr	\d.	d<	d.	d.	dr	d`	Voiced retroflex plosive
107	c	c	c	c	c	c	c	c	c	c	Voiceless palatal plosive
108	ɟ	j-	J	J	\j-	j=	dj	J^	J	J\	Voiced palatal plosive
109	k	k	k	k	k	k	k	k	k	k	Voiceless velar plosive
110	ɡ	g	g	g	\gs	g<	g	g	g	g	Voiced velar plosive
111	q	q	q	q	q	q	q	q	q	q	Voiceless uvular plosive
112	ɢ	G	G	G	\gc	G=	G	G	Q	G\	Voiced uvular plosive
113	ʔ	?	?	?	\?g	?=	?	?	?	?	Glottal plosive
114	m	m	m	m	m	m	m	m	m	m	Voiced bilabial nasal
115	ɱ	m"	m>	mv	\mj	m>	mD	M	M	F	Voiced labiodental nasal
116	n	n	n	n	n	n	n	n	n	n	Voiced alveolar nasal
117	ɳ	nr)	n(	nr	\n.	n<	n.	n.	nr	n`	Voiced retroflex nasal
118	ɲ	nj)	n)	nj	\nj	n=	nj	n^	n~	J	Voiced palatal nasal
119	ŋ	ng)	g~	ng	\ng	n>	N	N	N	N	Voiced velar nasal
120	ɴ	N	N	N	\nc	N=	nU	n"	Nq (Note: In Worldbet, these combinations are given as merely proposed for values "for which no machine-readable coding has yet been proposed".)	N\	Voiced uvular nasal
121	ʙ	B		bb	\bc	B=		b<trl>	B	B\	Voiced bilabial trill
122	r	r	r	rr	r	r	r	r<trl>	r	r	Voiced alveolar trill
123	ʀ	R	R	RR	\rc	R=	R	r"	R	R\	Voiced uvular trill
124	ɾ	r"	r*	dt	\fh	r>	r[	*	d(	4	Voiced alveolar tap
125	ɽ	rr)	r(*	rt	\f.	r<	r.[	*.	rr	r`	Voiced retroflex flap
126	ɸ	P"	F	F	\ff	f=	P	P	F	p\	Voiceless bilabial fricative
127	β	B"	B	V	\bf	b=	B	B	V	B	Voiced bilabial fricative
128	f	f	f	f	f	f	f	f	f	f	Voiceless labiodental fricative
129	v	v	v	v	v	v	v	v	v	v	Voiced labiodental fricative
130	θ	O-	s[]	sd	\tf	t=	0D	T	T	T	Voiceless dental fricative
131	ð	d-	z[]	zd	\dh	d=	6D	D	D	D	Voiced dental fricative
132	s	s	s	s	s	s	s	s	s	s	Voiceless alveolar fricative
133	z	z	z	z	z	z	z	z	z	z	Voiced alveolar fricative
134	ʃ	S	sV	S	\sh	s=	S	S	S	S	Voiceless postalveolar fricative
135	ʒ	3"	zV	Z	\zh	z=	Z	Z	Z	Z	Voiced postalveolar fricative
136	ʂ	sr)	s(	sr	\s.	s<	s.	s.	sr	s`	Voiceless retroflex fricative
137	ʐ	zr)	z(	zr	\z.	z<	z.	z.	zr	z`	Voiced retroflex fricative
138	ç	c"	c$	c\	\c,	c=	C	C	C	C	Voiceless palatal fricative
139	ʝ	j"	j$	J\	\jc	j<	jF	C<vcd>	j^	j\	Voiced palatal fricative
140	x	x	x	x	x	x	x	x	x	x	Voiceless velar fricative
141	ɣ	g"	r=<	g\	\gf	g=	gF	Q	G	G	Voiced velar fricative
142	χ	X	X	X	\cf	x=	X	X	X	X	Voiceless uvular fricative
143	ʁ	R%	R=	G\ (Note: The uvular approximant is represented by R in PHONASCII.)	\ri	R>	RF	g"	K	R	Voiced uvular fricative
144	ħ	h-	h<	H	\h-	h>	H	H	H	X\	Voiceless pharyngeal fricative
145	ʕ	?&	6<	Hv	\9e	?<	9	H<vcd>	!	?\	Voiced pharyngeal fricative
146	h	h	h	h	h	h	h	h	h	h	Voiceless glottal fricative
147	ɦ	h"	6	hv	\h^	h<	hh	h<?>	hv	h\	Voiced glottal fricative
148	ɬ	l-	l%$	ls	\l-	l=	hlF	s<lat> or L (Note: L represents either a voiceless alveolar lateral fricative, a velar approximant, or a velarized alveolar lateral approximant in the Usenet IPA/ASCII transcription.)	hl	K	Voiceless alveolar lateral fricative
149	ɮ	l3")	l$	lz	\lz	l>	lF	z<lat>	Zl	K\	Voiced alveolar lateral fricative
150	ʋ	v"	v>		\vs	v=	vA	r<lbd>	V[	P or V\	Voiced labiodental approximant
151	ɹ	r&	r=	r	\rt	r=	rA	r	9	r\	Voiced alveolar approximant
152	ɻ	jr)	r=(		\r.	R<	r.A	r.	9r	r\`	Voiced retroflex approximant
153	j	j	j	j	j	j	j	j	j	j	Voiced palatal approximant
154	ɰ	m&"		Rg	\ml	w>	RA	j<vel>	4)	M\	Voiced velar approximant
155	l	l	l	l	l	l	l	l	l	l	Voiced alveolar lateral approximant
156	ɭ	lr)	l(	lr	\l.	l<	l.	l.	lr	l`	Voiced retroflex lateral approximant
157	ʎ	y&	l)	lj	\yt	L<	lj	l^	L	L	Voiced palatal lateral approximant
158	ʟ	L			\lc	L=	L	L	Lg	L\	Voiced velar lateral approximant
160	ɓ	b$	b,,	b?	\b^	b>	b<	b`	b<	b_<	Voiced bilabial implosive
162	ɗ	d$	d,,	d?	\d^	d>	d<	d`	d<	d_<	Voiced alveolar implosive
164	ʄ	j$	J,,	J?	\j^	j>	dj<	J`	J<	J\_<	Voiced palatal implosive
166	ɠ	g$	g,,	g?	\g^	g>	g<	g`	g<	g_<	Voiced velar implosive
168	ʛ	G$	G,,	G?	\G^	G>	G<	G`	Q<	G\_<	Voiced uvular implosive
169	ʍ	w&			\wt	w=	hw	v<vls>	W	W	Voiceless labial–velar fricative
170	w	w	w	w	w	w	w	w	w	w	Voiced labial–velar approximant
171	ɥ	h&	w.		\ht	y< or h=	wj	j<rnd>	jw	H	Voiced labial–palatal approximant
172	ʜ	H			\hc	Q=				H\	Voiceless epiglottal trill
173	ʡ	?-			\?-	H=	99			>\	Epiglottal plosive
174	ʢ	?"			\9-	Q<				<\	Voiced epiglottal trill
175	ɧ	Sx)			\hj	H>				x\	Sj-sound
176	ʘ	p!	p*		\O.	p=		p!	p|	O\	Bilabial click
177	ǀ	t!	t*	t!	\|1	!<	/	t!	|	|\	Dental click
178	ǃ	r!			!	!	!	c! (Note: c! represents either an alveolar or palatal click in the Usenet IPA/ASCII transcription.)		!\	Alveolar click
179	ǂ	c!	c*	c!	\|-	!=	/=	c!	c|	=\	Palatal click
180	ǁ	l!	l*	l!	\|2	!>	#	l!	||	|\|\	Alveolar lateral click
181	ɺ	l"		lt	\rl	L>	l[	*<lat>	l)	l\	Voiced alveolar lateral flap
182	ɕ	ci)	sV>	ss	\cc	c<	SJ		c}	s\	Voiceless alveolo-palatal fricative
183	ʑ	zi)	zV>	zz	\zc	z>	ZJ		z}	z\	Voiced alveolo-palatal fricative
184	ⱱ				\V^	v<	v[				Voiced labiodental flap
209	ɫ	l~)	l-		\l~	l~~	l-	L		5	Velarized alveolar lateral approximant
301	i	i	i	i	i	i	i	i	i	i	Close front unrounded vowel
302	e	e	e	e	e	e	e	e	e	e	Close-mid front unrounded vowel
303	ɛ	E	E	E	\ef	e<	E	E	E	E	Open-mid front unrounded vowel
304	a	a	a	a	a	a	a	a	a	a	Open front unrounded vowel
305	ɑ	a"	A	aa	\as	a=	a_	A	A	A	Open back unrounded vowel
306	ɔ	c&	O	O	\ct	o<	O	O	>	O	Open-mid back rounded vowel
307	o	o	o	o	o	o	o	o	o	o	Close-mid back rounded vowel
308	u	u	u	u	u	u	u	u	u	u	Close back rounded vowel
309	y	y	y or i!	y	y	y	y	y	y	y	Close front rounded vowel
310	ø	o/)	0 or e!	oe	\o/	o>	o/	Y	7	2	Close-mid front rounded vowel
311	œ	oe)	E!	oE	\oe	E<	E)	W	8	9	Open-mid front rounded vowel
312	ɶ	OE)	a!	OE	\Oe	E>		&.	6	&	Open front rounded vowel
313	ɒ	a"&	A= or A!	ao	\ab	o=	a_)	A.	5	Q	Open back rounded vowel
314	ʌ	v&	^, V= or O!	A	\vt	u>	^	V	^	V	Open-mid back unrounded vowel
315	ɤ	U"	o!	oo	\rh	O>	o(	o-	2	7	Close-mid back unrounded vowel
316	ɯ	m&	m= or u!	uu	\mt	u=	uu	u-	4	M	Close back unrounded vowel
317	ɨ	i-	i"	i-	\i-	I=	i_	i"	ix	1	Close central unrounded vowel
318	ʉ	u-	u"	u-	\u-	U=	u+	u"	ux	}	Close central rounded vowel
319	ɪ	I	I	I	\ic	i=	I	I	I	I	Near-close near-front unrounded vowel
320	ʏ	Y	Y	Y	\yc	Y=	Y	U.	Y	Y	Near-close near-front rounded vowel
321	ʊ	U	U	U	\hs	u<	U	U	U	U	Near-close near-back rounded vowel
322	ə	@	e=	6	\sw	e=	"@	@	&	@	Mid central vowel
323	ɵ	o-	o"		\o-	O=	@)	@.	ox	8	Close-mid central rounded vowel
324	ɐ	a&			\at	a>	4		ax	6	Near-open central vowel
325	æ	ae)	@	ae	\ae	a<	aa	&	@	{	Near-open front unrounded vowel
326	ɜ	E&	E"	3	\er	e>	3	V"	3	3	Open-mid central unrounded vowel
327	ɚ	xr^		3r	\sr		"@.	R		@`	R-coloured mid central vowel
395	ɞ	E"	O"		\kb	O<	3)	O"		3\	Open-mid central rounded vowel
397	ɘ	e&	e"	6	\e-	E=	@	@<umd>		@\	Close-mid central unrounded vowel
401	◌ʼ	`		?	\ap	]]	'	`	>	_>	Ejective
402A	◌̥	V)	%	,-v	\0v	%		<o>	0	_0	Voiceless
402B	◌̊	V)	%	,-v	\0^	@		<o>	0	_0	Voiceless
403	◌̬	v)		,+v	\vv	%%		<vcd>	v	_v	Voiced
404	ʰ	h^	HH	,h	\^h	h^	h	<h>	h	_h	Aspirated
405	◌̤	h")		,hv	\:v	%%%	h	<?>	Hv	_t	Breathy voiced
406	◌̰	~		,?v	\~v	$$$	*		?	_k	Creaky voiced
407	◌̼	{			\mv	{{{{			{	_N	Linguolabial
408	◌̪	[	[	,d	\Nv	{		[	[	_d	Dental
409	◌̺	]		,ap	\Uv	{{			]	_a	Apical
410	◌̻	[]		,lm	\Dv	{{{			}	_m	Laminal
411	◌̹	u)	}	,+w	\3v	++++		.	(w)	_O	More rounded
412	◌̜	U)	{		\cv	____		-		_c	Less rounded
413	◌̟	+	+	,< or ,fr	\+v	+			+	_+	Advanced
414	◌̠	_	(Note: represents either retracted or "velarized or pharyngealized" in Millar & Oasa's system.)	,> or ,bk	\-v	_			-	_-	Retracted
415	◌̈	"^	"		\:^	*		"		_"	Centralized
416	◌̽	x^			\x^	**				_x	Mid-centralized
417	◌̘	<			\T(	+++			¿ (Note: ¿ and ¡ are not part of ASCII, but are nonetheless proposed as encoding advanced and retracted tongue root, respectively, in Worldbet.)	_A	Advanced tongue root
418	◌̙	>			\T)	___			¡	_q	Retracted tongue root
419	◌˞	r^			\hr	[[[	.	<r>		`	Rhoticity
420	ʷ	w^		,V\	\^w	w^	W	<w>	w	_w	Labialized
421	ʲ	j^	.	,j	\^j	j^	J	<pzd>	j	' or _j	Palatalized
422	ˠ	g^		,g	\^G	g=^	-	<vzd>	2	_G	Velarized
423	ˤ	&g^		,H	\^9	?<^	9	<H>	!	_?\	Pharyngealized
424	◌̃	~^	~	,+n	\~^	~	~	~	~	~ or _~	Nasalized
425	ⁿ	n^		,n-	\^n	n^	n		n	_n	Nasal release
426	ˡ	l^		,l-	\^l	l^	L		l	_l	Lateral release
427	◌̚	.)		,=	\cn	]]]		<unx>	c	_}	No audible release
428	◌̴	~)	-		\~/					_e	Velarized or pharyngealized
429	◌̝	=	. (Note: . represents either raised or palatalized in Millar & Oasa's system.)	,/ or ,up	\T^	++				_r	Raised
430	◌̞	="	(	,\ or ,dn	\Tv	__				_o	Lowered
431	◌̩	,)	\	,$	\|v	$		-	=	= or _=	Syllabic
432	◌̯	(	* (Note: * represents either non-syllabic or extra-short in Millar & Oasa's system.)	,gl	\nv	$$			(	_^	Non-syllabic
433	◌͡◌	)) (Note: )) representing a tie bar is placed after both segments, as in ts)), in Branner's system.)		_	\li	#&				_	Affricate or double articulation
433	◌͜◌	))		_	\LI	@&				_	Affricate or double articulation
501	ˈ	'	'	$S5	\'1	}		'	`	"	Primary stress
502	ˌ	,	`	$S3	\'2	}}		,	'	%	Secondary stress
503	ː	:	|	,:	\:f	:	:	:	:	:	Long
504	ˑ	;	:	,.	\.f	::			;	:\	Half-long
505	◌̆	(^	*	,--	\N^	***	S		(	_X	Extra-short
506	.	.		$	.	.		#	.	.	Syllable break
507	|	|			|	.<				|	Minor (foot) group
508	‖	||			||	.=				||	Major (intonation) group
509	‿	=)			\_u	#=				-\	Linking (absence of a break)
510	↗	/			\NE	#>>				</> or <R>	Global rise
511	↘	\			\SE	#<<				<\> or <F>	Global fall
512	◌̋	5	5	$T5-	\''	@4			_9	_T	Extra-high
513	◌́	4	4	$T4-	\'^	@3			_7	_H	High
514	◌̄	3	3	$T3-	\-^	@2			_5	_M	Mid
515	◌̀	2	2	$T2-	\`^	@1			_3	_L	Low
516	◌̏	1	1	$T1-	\``	@0			_1	_B	Extra-low
517	ꜛ	/)			\|u	#<				^	Upstep
518	ꜜ	\)			\|d	#>				!	Downstep
519	˥	5	5	$T5-	\-5	#4				<T>	Extra-high
520	˦	4	4	$T4-	\-4	#3				<H>	High
521	˧	3	3	$T3-	\-3	#2				<M>	Mid
522	˨	2	2	$T2-	\-2	#1				<L>	Low
523	˩	1	1	$T1-	\-1	#0				<B>	Extra-low
524	◌̌	15	15	$1/	\v^	@13				_L_H, _R or _/	Rising
525	◌̂	51	51	$5\	\^^	@31				_H_L, _F or _\	Falling
526	◌᷄	35	35	$3/	\-'	@23				_H_T	High-rising
527	◌᷅	13	13	$3\	\`-	@12				_B_L	Low-rising
528	◌᷈	342	342	$T3^	\rf	@131				_M_H_L, _R_F or _/_\	Rising–falling

== Coverage ==
Scope	Branner	Millar & Oasa	PHONASCII	Praat	SIL	UPSID	Usenet	Worldbet	X-SAMPA
Consonants (80)	79 (99%)	69 (86%)	67 (84%)	80 (100%)	80 (100%)	75 (94%)	73 (91%)	73 (91%)	79 (99%)
Vowels (29)	29 (100%)	27 (93%)	26 (90%)	29 (100%)	28 (97%)	28 (97%)	28 (97%)	26 (90%)	29 (100%)
Diacritics (35)	34 (97%)	15 (43%)	25 (71%)	35 (100%)	34 (97%)	12 (34%)	17 (49%)	25 (71%)	26 (74%)
Suprasegmentals (28)	28 (100%)	20 (71%)	21 (75%)	28 (100%)	28 (100%)	2 (7%)	4 (14%)	11 (39%)	28 (100%)
Total (172)	170 (99%)	131 (76%)	139 (81%)	172 (100%)	170 (99%)	117 (68%)	122 (71%)	135 (78%)	162 (94%)

== See also ==
- ARPABET
- SAMPA

== Notes ==
Place →	Labial					Coronal										Dorsal					Laryngeal			
Manner ↓	Bilabial		Labiodental		Linguolabial		Dental		Alveolar		Postalveolar		Retroflex		Palatal		Velar		Uvular		Pharyngeal/epiglottal		Glottal	
Nasal	m̥	m	ɱ̊	ɱ		n̼	n̪̊	n̪	n̥	n	n̠̊	n̠	ɳ̊	ɳ	ɲ̊	ɲ	ŋ̊	ŋ	ɴ̥	ɴ				
Plosive	p	b	p̪	b̪	t̼	d̼	t̪	d̪	t	d			ʈ	ɖ	c	ɟ	k	ɡ	q	ɢ	ʡ		ʔ	
Sibilant affricate							t̪s̪	d̪z̪	ts	dz	t̠ʃ	d̠ʒ	tʂ	dʐ	tɕ	dʑ								
Non-sibilant affricate	pɸ	bβ	p̪f	b̪v			t̪θ	d̪ð	tɹ̝̊	dɹ̝	t̠ɹ̠̊˔	d̠ɹ̠˔			cç	ɟʝ	kx	ɡɣ	qχ	ɢʁ	ʡʜ	ʡʢ	ʔh	
Sibilant fricative							s̪	z̪	s	z	ʃ	ʒ	ʂ	ʐ	ɕ	ʑ								
Non-sibilant fricative	ɸ	β	f	v	θ̼	ð̼	θ	ð	θ̠	ð̠	ɹ̠̊˔	ɹ̠˔	ɻ̊˔	ɻ˔	ç	ʝ	x	ɣ	χ	ʁ	ħ	ʕ	h	ɦ
Approximant		β̞		ʋ				ð̞		ɹ		ɹ̠		ɻ		j		ɰ						˷
Tap/flap		ⱱ̟		ⱱ					ɾ̥	ɾ			ɽ̊	ɽ						ɢ̆		ʡ̮		
Trill	ʙ̥	ʙ							r̥	r		r̠	ɽ̊r̥	ɽr					ʀ̥	ʀ	ʜ	ʢ		
Lateral affricate									tɬ	dɮ			tꞎ	d𝼅	c𝼆	ɟʎ̝	k𝼄	ɡʟ̝						
Lateral fricative							ɬ̪		ɬ	ɮ			ꞎ	𝼅	𝼆	ʎ̝	𝼄	ʟ̝						
Lateral approximant								l̪	l̥	l		l̠	ɭ̊	ɭ	ʎ̥	ʎ	ʟ̥	ʟ		ʟ̠				
Lateral tap/flap									ɺ̥	ɺ			𝼈̊	𝼈		ʎ̮		ʟ̆						

		BL	LD	D	A	PA	RF	P	V	U
Implosive	Voiced	ɓ			ɗ		ᶑ	ʄ	ɠ	ʛ
Implosive	Voiceless	ɓ̥			ɗ̥		ᶑ̊	ʄ̊	ɠ̊	ʛ̥
Ejective	Stop	pʼ			tʼ		ʈʼ	cʼ	kʼ	qʼ
Ejective	Affricate		p̪fʼ	t̪θʼ	tsʼ	t̠ʃʼ	tʂʼ	tɕʼ	kxʼ	qχʼ
Ejective	Fricative	ɸʼ	fʼ	θʼ	sʼ	ʃʼ	ʂʼ	ɕʼ	xʼ	χʼ
Ejective	Lateral affricate				tɬʼ			c𝼆ʼ	k𝼄ʼ	q𝼄ʼ
Ejective	Lateral fricative				ɬʼ					
Click (top: velar; bottom: uvular)	Tenuis	kʘ qʘ		kǀ qǀ	kǃ qǃ		k𝼊 q𝼊	kǂ qǂ		
Click (top: velar; bottom: uvular)	Voiced	ɡʘ ɢʘ		ɡǀ ɢǀ	ɡǃ ɢǃ		ɡ𝼊 ɢ𝼊	ɡǂ ɢǂ		
Click (top: velar; bottom: uvular)	Nasal	ŋʘ ɴʘ		ŋǀ ɴǀ	ŋǃ ɴǃ		ŋ𝼊 ɴ𝼊	ŋǂ ɴǂ	ʞ	
Click (top: velar; bottom: uvular)	Tenuis lateral				kǁ qǁ					
Click (top: velar; bottom: uvular)	Voiced lateral				ɡǁ ɢǁ					
Click (top: velar; bottom: uvular)	Nasal lateral				ŋǁ ɴǁ					
