= Luciano Canepari =

Italian linguist (born 1947)

- Born: 19 January 1947 (age 79); Venice, Italy
- Occupation: Linguist

The canIPA vocoid system

Luciano Canepari (Italian pronunciation: [luˈtʃaːno kaneˈpaːri]; born 19 January 1947) is an Italian linguist. Canepari was a professor in the Department of Linguistics at the University of Venice, where he received his academic training.

He developed a phonetic transcription system called canIPA [kaˈniːpa], based on the official IPA. The canIPA consists of 500 basic, 300 complementary and 200 supplementary symbols, a few of which are encoded in Unicode. It is a work in progress, intended to permit the transcription of all world languages in more exact detail than the official IPA. Although not widely adopted as a general standard, the system has been praised as a major advance in descriptive phonetics and the transcription of fine dialectal nuances.

== ^{can}IPA ==
Canepari developed a phonetic alphabet called ^{can}IPA. In the works he has authored, both IPA and ^{can}IPA are shown, with the IPA sometimes labeled as ^{off}IPA (as in "official IPA"; in his works in Italian, ^{uff}IPA "ufficiale"). The ^{can}IPA has many unfamiliar rows and columns not in the IPA. The symbols and classification within ^{can}IPA have been altered multiple times throughout Canepari's work, and a large sum of the symbols have no equivalent in Unicode; they therefore cannot be directly displayed here.

== Bibliography ==
- ɪtæljən prənɐnsɪeɪʃn. in: Le Maître Phonétique, 133: 6–8, 1970 JSTOR 44705785
- The Dialect of Venice. in: Journal of the International Phonetic Association, 67–76, 1976
- Introduzione alla fonetica. Torino: Einaudi, 1979
- Fonetica e tonetica araba. in: Scritti linguistici in onore di Giovan Battista Pellegrini, 1105–1121. Pisa: Pacini, 1983.
- Phonetic Notation/La notazione fonetica. Venice: Cafoscarina, 1983 (in English and Italian; with two audio-cassettes)
- L’intonazione. Linguistica e paralinguistica. Napoli: Liguori, 1985
- Italiano standard e pronunce regionali. Padova: CLEUP, 1986³ (with two audio-cassettes)
- Lingua italiana nel Lazio. Roma: Jouvence, 1989 (co-authored by Antonella Troncon)
- Dizionario di pronuncia italiana. Bologna: Zanichelli, 1999; new ed. 2000 — There is an on-line version (copyright 2012) at dipionline.it.
- Manuale di pronuncia italiana. Bologna: Zanichelli, 1999; new ed. 2004
- Manuale di fonetica. Fonetica naturale. München: Lincom Europa, 2003
  - translated as: A Handbook of Phonetics: Natural Phonetics. München: Lincom Europa, 2005
- Manuale di pronuncia. Italiano, inglese, francese, tedesco, spagnolo, portoghese, russo, arabo, hindi, cinese, giapponese, esperanto. München: Lincom Europa, 2003; new ed. 2007
  - translated as: A Handbook of Pronunciation: English, Italian, French, German, Spanish, Portuguese, Russian, Arabic, Hindi, Chinese, Japanese, Esperanto. München: Lincom Europa, 2005; new ed. 2007
- Avviamento alla fonetica. Torino: Einaudi, 2006
- Fonetica e tonetica naturali. München: Lincom Europa, 2007
  - translated as: Natural Phonetics and Tonetics. München: Lincom Europa, 2007 — This is the revised edition of A Handbook of Phonetics: Natural Phonetics from 2005.
- Pronunce straniere dell'italiano. 2007
- Pronuncia cinese per italiani. Roma: Aracne, 2009 (co-authored by Marco Cerini)
- English pronunciationS. [Vol.1: International, American & British neutral accents. Vol. 2: Territorial accents] Roma: Aracne, 2010
- La buona pronuncia italiana del terzo millennio. Roma: Aracne, 2010³ (co-authored by Barbara Giovannelli; with a CD-ROM)
- The Pronunciation of English around the World. München: Lincom Europa, 2010
- Pronuncia francese per italiani. Roma: Aracne, 2011³
- Pronuncia inglese per italiani. Roma: Aracne, 2011³
- Pronuncia portoghese per italiani. Roma: Aracne, 2011²
- Pronuncia spagnola per italiani. Roma: Aracne, 2011 (co-authored by Renzo Miotti)
- Pronuncia tedesca per italiani. Roma: Aracne, 2011
- Fonologia del santarcangiolese. Verucchio: Pazzini 2012 (co-authored by Giuseppe Bellosi and Daniele Vitali)
- Dutch & Afrikaans Pronunciation & Accents. München: Lincom Europa, 2013; 2nd ed. 2016; and a cheaper edition: Roma: Aracne, 2013 (co-authored by Marco Cerini)
- Pronuncia neerlandese per italiani. Roma: Aracne, 2013 (co-authored by Marco Cerini)
- Pronuncia russa per italiani. Roma: Aracne, 2013 (co-authored by Daniele Vitali)
- German Pronunciation & Accents. München: Lincom Europa, 2014
- Chinese Pronunciation & Accents. München: Lincom Europa, 2015 (co-authored by Marco Cerini)
- English Pronunciation & Accents. München: Lincom Europa, 2015
- Hindi Pronunciation & Accents. München: Lincom Europa, 2016 (co-authored by Ghanshyam Sharma)
- Japanese Pronunciation & Accents. München: Lincom Europa, 2016 (co-authored by Francesca Miscio)
- Pronuncia giapponese per italiani. Roma: Aracne 2016 (co-authored by Francesca Miscio)

He has also published a number of workbooks and recordings used in connection with these books.
