= Phonetic transcription =

Visual representation of speech sounds

Phonetic transcription or phonetic notation is the written representation of speech sounds (phonetics). The most common type of phonetic transcription uses a phonetic alphabet, such as the International Phonetic Alphabet.

== Versus orthography ==
The pronunciation of words in all languages changes over time. However, their written forms (orthography) are often not modified to take account of such changes, and do not accurately represent the pronunciation. Words borrowed from other languages may retain the spelling from the original language, which may have a different system of correspondences between written symbols and speech sounds. Pronunciation can also vary greatly among dialects of a language. Standard orthography in some languages, such as English and Tibetan, is often irregular and makes it difficult to predict pronunciation from spelling. For example, the words bough, tough, cough, though and through do not rhyme in English even though their spellings might suggest otherwise. Other languages, such as Spanish and Italian, have a more consistent (but still imperfect) relationship between orthography and pronunciation. In contrast, a few languages may claim to have a fully phonemic spelling system (a phonemic orthography).

For most languages, phonetic transcription makes it possible to show pronunciation with something much nearer to a one-to-one relationship between sound and symbol than is possible with the language's orthography. Phonetic transcription allows one to step outside orthography, examine differences in pronunciation between dialects within a given language and identify changes in pronunciation that may take place over time.

A basic principle of phonetic transcription is that it should apply to all languages, and its symbols should denote the same phonetic properties, whatever the language being transcribed. It follows that a transcription devised for one individual language or group of languages is not a phonetic transcription but an orthography.

== Degrees of abstraction ==
Phonemic transcription distinguishes only the phonemes of the language, disregarding allophonic differences and differences between speakers. That is, it is a representation of a language's abstract word-distinguishing units of sound. Phonetic transcription indicates the articulatory and acoustic details (phones) of the language. A transcription that includes some allophonic detail but still closely follows the phonemic structure of an utterance is called an allophonic transcription. A transcription that accommodates for the variation between the phonemic systems of different varieties or diasystems of a language is called a diaphonemic transcription.

In phonetic transcription, there is a continuum between broad transcription, which indicates only the most salient phonetic features, and narrow transcription, which indicates additional phonetic details to varying degrees.

Narrow transcription may help learners produce proper pronunciation and allows linguists to make detailed analyses of language variation. Broad transcription may cover multiple dialects and 'accents' and is thus more appropriate for the pronunciation data in ordinary dictionaries.

A narrow transcription is rarely representative of all dialects or speakers of a language. For example, most American, Canadian, and Australian speakers of English would pronounce the /t/ in the word little as a tap [ɾ] and the initial /l/ as a dark L (often represented as [ɫ]), but speakers in southern England pronounce the /t/ as [ʔ] (a glottal stop; see t-glottalization) and the second /l/ as a vowel resembling [o] (L-vocalization). Thus, on the one hand, phonetically, little can be represented as something like [ˈɫɪɾɫ̩] in many American, Canadian, and Australian accents but [ˈlɪʔo] in a southern English accent. Furthermore, in Australian accents especially, the first-syllable vowel of little tends to be higher than in North America, leading to the possibility of employing an even narrower phonetic transcription to indicate this, such as [ˈɫɪ̝ɾɫ̩]. On the other hand, a broad phonetic transcription of little is also possible which ignores all the above specifics of these aforementioned dialects; this can be useful in situations where minor details are not important to distinguish or where the emphasis is on overarching phonetic patterns. A broad transcription may be considered one of several possible solutions for a phonemic representation. For example, one typical broad phonetic transcription for the word little is represented as phonemic /ˈlɪtᵊl/ in both British and American English dictionaries. Following IPA convention, square brackets are placed around phonetic representations, and slashes around phonemic representations.

== Types of notational systems ==
Most phonetic transcription is based on the assumption that linguistic sounds are segmentable into discrete units that can be represented by symbols. Many different types of transcription, or "notation", have been tried out: these may be divided into Alphabetic (which are based on the same principle as that which governs ordinary alphabetic writing, namely that of using one single simple symbol to represent each sound) and Analphabetic (notations which are not alphabetic) which represent each sound by a composite symbol made up of several signs put together.

=== Alphabetic ===
The IPA chart (2020 revision)

The International Phonetic Alphabet (IPA) is the most widely used and well-known of present-day phonetic alphabets and has a long history. It was created in the nineteenth century by European language teachers and linguists. It soon developed beyond its original purpose as a tool of foreign language pedagogy and is now also used extensively as a practical alphabet of phoneticians and linguists. It is found in many dictionaries, where it is used to indicate the pronunciation of words, but most American dictionaries for native English-speakers, e.g., American Heritage Dictionary of the English Language, Random House Dictionary of the English Language, Webster's Third New International Dictionary, avoid phonetic transcription and instead employ respelling systems based on the English alphabet, with diacritical marks over the vowels and stress marks. (See Pronunciation respelling for English for a generic version.)

Another commonly encountered alphabetic tradition was created by American linguists for the transcription of Native American and European languages and is still commonly used by linguists of Slavic, Indic, Semitic, Uralic (here known as the Uralic Phonetic Alphabet) and Caucasian languages. This is often labeled the Americanist phonetic alphabet despite having been widely used for languages outside the Americas. The principal difference between these alphabets and the IPA is that the specially created characters of the IPA are abandoned in favour of already existing typewriter characters with diacritics (e.g. many characters are borrowed from Eastern European orthographies) or digraphs. Examples of this transcription may be seen in Pike's Phonemics and in many of the papers reprinted in Joos's Readings in Linguistics 1. In the days before it was possible to create phonetic fonts for computer printers and computerized typesetting, this system allowed material to be typed on existing typewriters to create printable material.

There are also extended versions of the IPA, for example: Ext-IPA, VoQS, and Luciano Canepari's ^{can}IPA.

==== Aspects of alphabetic transcription ====
The International Phonetic Association recommends that a phonetic transcription should be enclosed in square brackets "[ ]". A transcription that specifically denotes only phonemic contrasts may be enclosed in slashes "/ /" instead. If one is unsure, it is best to use brackets since by setting off a transcription with slashes, one makes a theoretical claim that every symbol phonemically contrasts for the language being transcribed.

For phonetic transcriptions, there is flexibility in how closely sounds may be transcribed. A transcription that gives only a basic idea of the sounds of a language in the broadest terms is called a broad transcription; in some cases, it may be equivalent to a phonemic transcription (only without any theoretical claims). A close transcription, indicating precise details of the sounds, is called a narrow transcription. They are not binary choices but the ends of a continuum, with many possibilities in between. All are enclosed in brackets.

For example, in some dialects, the English word pretzel in a narrow transcription would be [ˈpɹ̥ʷɛʔts.ɫ̩], which notes several phonetic features that may not be evident even to a native speaker. An example of a broad transcription is [ˈpɹ̥ɛts.ɫ̩], which indicates only some of the features that are easier to hear. A yet broader transcription would be [ˈpɹɛts.l] in which every symbol represents an unambiguous speech sound but without going into any unnecessary detail. None of those transcriptions makes any claims about the phonemic status of the sounds. Instead, they represent certain ways in which it is possible to produce the sounds that make up the word.

There are also several possibilities in how to transcribe the word phonemically, but here, the differences are generally of not precision but analysis. For example, pretzel could be /ˈprɛts.l̩/ or /ˈprɛts.əl/. The latter transcription suggests that there are two vowels in the word even if they cannot both be heard, but the former suggests that there is only one.

Strictly speaking, it is not possible to have a distinction between "broad" and "narrow" within phonemic transcription, since the symbols chosen represent only sounds that have been shown to be distinctive. However, the symbols themselves may be more or less explicit about their phonetic realization. A frequently cited example is the symbol chosen for the English consonant at the beginning of the words 'rue', 'rye', 'red': this is frequently transcribed as /r/, despite the symbol suggesting an association with the IPA symbol [r] which is used for a tongue-tip trill. It is equally possible within a phonemic transcription to use the symbol /ɹ/, which in IPA usage refers to an alveolar approximant; this is the more common realization for English pronunciation in America and England. Phonemic symbols will frequently be chosen to avoid diacritics as much as possible, under a 'one sound one symbol' policy, or may even be restricted to the ASCII symbols of a typical keyboard, as in the SAMPA recoding of the IPA. For example, the English word church may be transcribed as /ˈtʃɝːtʃ/, a close approximation of its actual pronunciation, or more abstractly as /ˈcrc/, which is easier to type. Phonemic symbols should always be backed up by an explanation of their use and meaning, especially when they are as divergent from actual pronunciation as /ˈcrc/.

Occasionally a transcription will be enclosed in pipes ("| |"). This goes beyond phonology into morphological analysis. For example, the words pets and beds could be transcribed phonetically as [pʰɛʔts] and [b̥ɛd̥z̥] (in a fairly narrow transcription), and phonemically as /pɛts/ and /bɛdz/. Because /s/ and /z/ are separate phonemes in English, they receive separate symbols in the phonemic analysis. However, a native English speaker would recognize that underneath this, they represent the same plural ending. This can be indicated with the pipe notation. If the plural ending is thought to be essentially an s, as English spelling would suggest, the words can be transcribed |pɛts| and |bɛds|. If it is essentially a z, these would be |pɛtz| and |bɛdz|.

A double slash ("⫽ ⫽") is sometimes used to mark a diaphonemic transcription. For example, if a speaker of variety A pronounces the lexical set BATH with an [ɑː] as in the lexical set PALM, whereas a speaker of variety B pronounces the lexical set BATH with an [æ] as in the lexical set TRAP, then a diaphonemic transcription that accommodates for variety A and variety B at the same time would transcribe the three lexical sets in three different ways; for instance PALM ⫽pɑːm⫽, TRAP ⫽træp⫽, and BATH ⫽baθ⫽, where the ⫽a⫽ would mean 'pronounced [ɑː] in variety A and [æ] in variety B.' Other ways to mark diaphonemic transcriptions include exclamation marks ("! !") or pipes ("| |").

To avoid confusion with IPA symbols, it may be desirable to specify when native orthography is being used, so that, for example, the English word jet is not read as "yet". This is done with angle brackets or chevrons: ⟨jet⟩. It is also common to italicize such words, but the chevrons indicate specifically that they are in the original language's orthography, and not in English transliteration.

=== Iconic ===
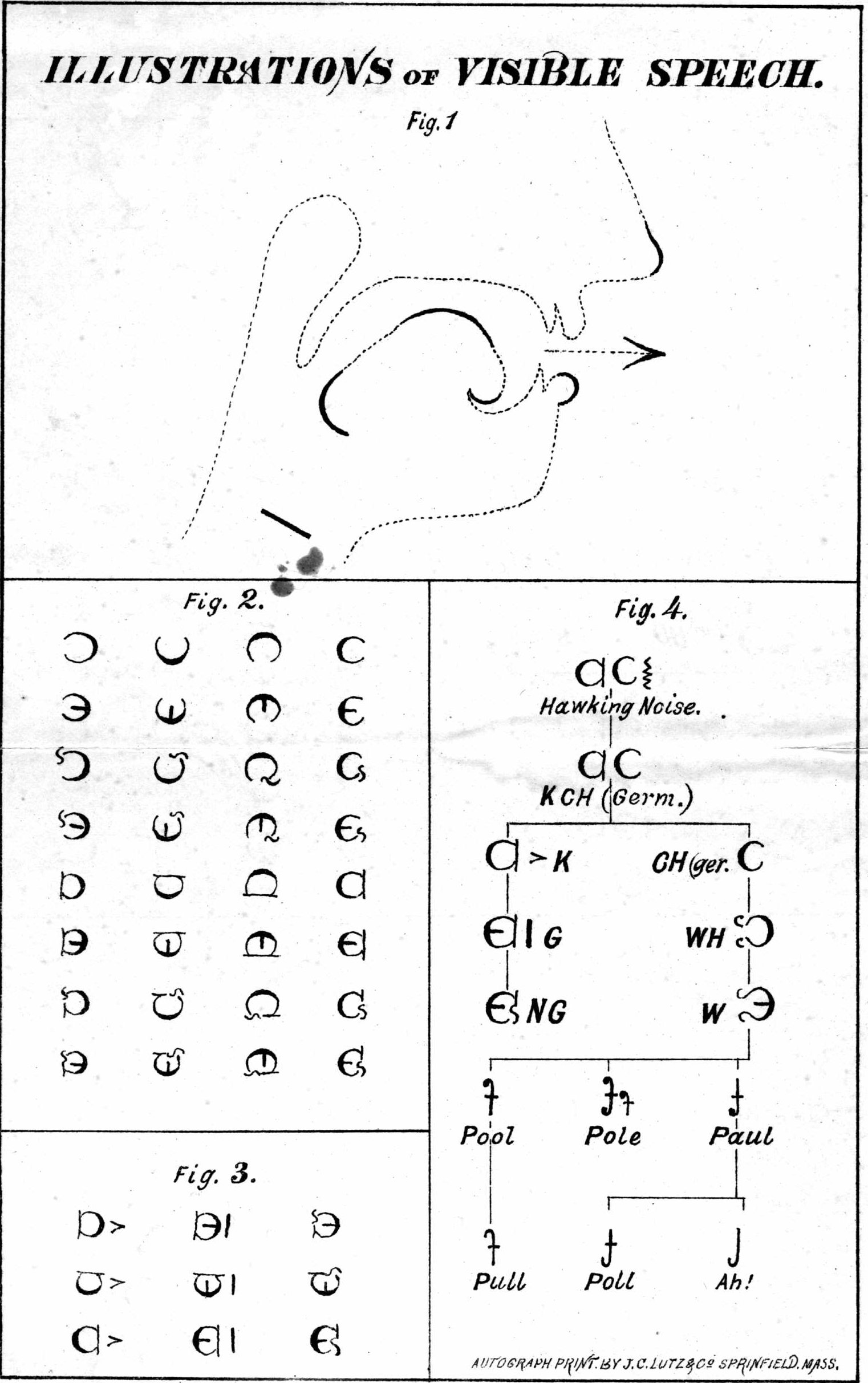
Bell's Visible Speech system

In iconic phonetic notation, the shapes of the phonetic characters are designed so that they visually represent the position of articulators in the vocal tract. This is unlike alphabetic notation, where the correspondence between character shape and articulator position is arbitrary. This notation is potentially more flexible than alphabetic notation in showing more shades of pronunciation. An example of iconic phonetic notation is the Visible Speech system, created by Scottish phonetician Alexander Melville Bell.

=== Analphabetic ===
Another type of phonetic notation that is more precise than alphabetic notation is analphabetic phonetic notation. Instead of both the alphabetic and iconic notational types' general principle of using one symbol per sound, analphabetic notation uses long sequences of symbols to precisely describe the component features of an articulatory gesture (MacMahon 1996:842–844). This type of notation is reminiscent of the notation used in chemical formulas to denote the composition of chemical compounds. Although more descriptive than alphabetic notation, analphabetic notation is less practical for many purposes (e.g. for descriptive linguists doing fieldwork or for speech pathologists transcribing their impressions of speech disorders). As a result, this type of notation is uncommon.

Two examples of this type were developed by the Danish Otto Jespersen (1889) and American Kenneth Pike (1943). Pike's system, which is part of a larger goal of scientific description of phonetics, is particularly interesting in its challenge against the descriptive method of the phoneticians who created alphabetic systems like the IPA. An example of Pike's system can be demonstrated by the following. A syllabic voiced alveolar nasal consonant ([n̩] in IPA) is notated as

MaIlDeCVoeIpvnnAPpaatdtltnransnsfSpvavdtlvtnransssfTpgagdtlwvtitvransnsfSrpFSs

In Pike's notation there are 5 main components (which are indicated using the example above):

1. M – manner of production (i.e., MaIlDe)
2. C – manner of controlling (i.e., CVoeIpvnn)
3. description of stricture (i.e., APpaatdtltnransnsfSpvavdtlvtnransssfTpgagdtlwvtitvransnsf)
4. S – segment type (i.e., Srp)
5. F – phonetic function (i.e., FSs)

The components of the notational hierarchy of this consonant are explained below:

M = productive mechanism a = air-stream mechanism I = initiator l = for lung air D = direction of the air stream e = egressive C = controlling mechanism V = valvate stricture o = oral stricture e = subvalvate esophageal stricture I = degree of air-stream interruption p = partial (continuants) v = nonfrictional n = nasal n = resonant nasal	(Rank of stricture) A = acme P = primary (Features of stricture) p = point of articulation a = alveolar a = articulator t = tongue tip d = degree of articulation t = in time l = long t = type of articulation n = normal r = relative strength a = of articulating movement n = normal s = of acoustic impression n = normal s = shape of articulator f = flat (Rank of stricture) S = secondary (Features of stricture) p = point of articulation v = velic a = articulator v = velic (Features of stricture) p = point of articulation g = glottal a = articulator g = vocal folds d = degree of articulation t = in time l = long w = wide v = with cavity friction t = type of articulation i = iterative t = trill v = vibratory trill r = relative strength a = of articulating movement n = normal s = of acoustic impression n = normal s = shape of articulator f = flat	S = segmental type r = real p = perceptual F = function phonetically S = of the segment in the syllable s = syllabic contoid

== See also ==
- English Phonetic Alphabet
- Eye dialect, deliberately nonstandard spelling to demonstrate pronunciation in literature
- Orthographic transcription
- Phonetic spelling
- Phonetics
- Pronunciation respelling for English
- Pronunciation spelling
- Romanization
- Transliteration

=== Notational systems ===
- Americanist phonetic notation
- ARPABET
- Cyrillic phonetic alphabets
- International Phonetic Alphabet
  - Comparison of ASCII encodings of the International Phonetic Alphabet
  - SAMPA
  - X-SAMPA
  - IPA chart for English
- RFE Phonetic Alphabet, (Revista de Filología Española)
- Stokoe notation to represent sign languages
- Uralic Phonetic Alphabet (UPA)
- Visible Speech
- Teuthonista

== General references ==
- Albright, Robert W. (1958). The International Phonetic Alphabet: Its Background and Development. International Journal of American Linguistics (Vol. 24, No. 1, Part 3); Indiana University Research Center in Anthropology, Folklore, and Linguistics, publ. 7. Baltimore. (Doctoral dissertation, Stanford University, 1953).
- Canepari, Luciano (2005). A handbook of phonetics: "natural" phonetics: articulatory, auditory & functional. LINCOM textbooks in linguistics. Munich: LINCOM Europa. ISBN 978-3-89586-480-3.
- Ellis, Alexander J. (1869–1889). On Early English Pronunciation (Parts 1 & 5). London: Philological Society by Asher & Co.; London: Trübner & Co.
- International Phonetic Association. (1949). The Principles of the International Phonetic Association, Being a Description of the International Phonetic Alphabet and the Manner of Using It, Illustrated by Texts in 51 Languages. London: University College, Department of Phonetics.
- Handbook of the International Phonetic Association: a guide to the use of the international phonetic alphabet. Cambridge University Press. 2021. ISBN 978-0-521-65236-0.
- Jespersen, Otto. (1889). The Articulations of Speech Sounds Represented by Means of Analphabetic Symbols. Marburg: Elwert.
- Kelly, John. (1981). The 1847 Alphabet: An Episode of Phonotypy. In R. E. Asher & E. J. A. Henderson (Eds.), Towards a History of Phonetics. Edinburgh: Edinburgh University Press.|
- Kemp, J. Alan. (1994). Phonetic Transcription: History. In R. E. Asher & J. M. Y. Simpson (Eds.), The Encyclopedia of Language and Linguistics (Vol. 6, pp. 3040–3051). Oxford: Pergamon.
- MacMahon, Michael K. C. (1996). "Phonetic Notation". In Daniels, Peter T.; Bright, William (eds.). The world's writing systems. Oxford University Press. pp. 821–846. ISBN 978-0-19-507993-7.
- Pike, Kenneth L. (1943). Phonetics: A Critical Analysis of Phonetic Theory and a Technique for the Practical Description of Sounds. Ann Arbor: University of Michigan Press.
- Pullum, Geoffrey K.; Ladusaw, William A. (1986). Phonetic symbol guide. Chicago: University of Chicago Press. ISBN 978-0-226-68531-1.
- Sweet, Henry. (1880–1881). Sound Notation. Transactions of the Philological Society, 177–235.
- Sweet, Henry. (1971). The Indispensable Foundation: A Selection from the Writings of Henry Sweet. Henderson, Eugénie J. A. (Ed.). Language and Language Learning 28. London: Oxford University Press.
