= Unified Northern Alphabet =

Latin-based alphabet

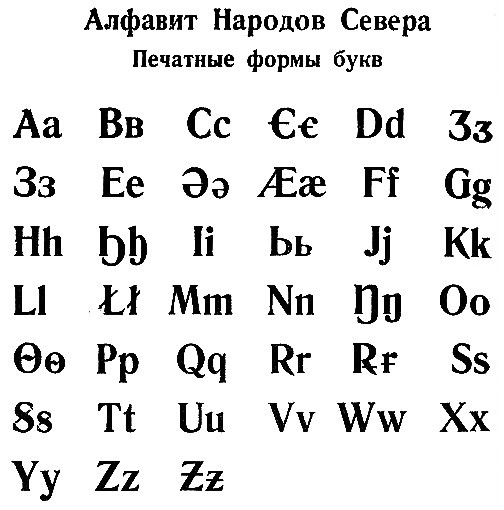
The Latin-based Unified Northern Alphabet, 1932

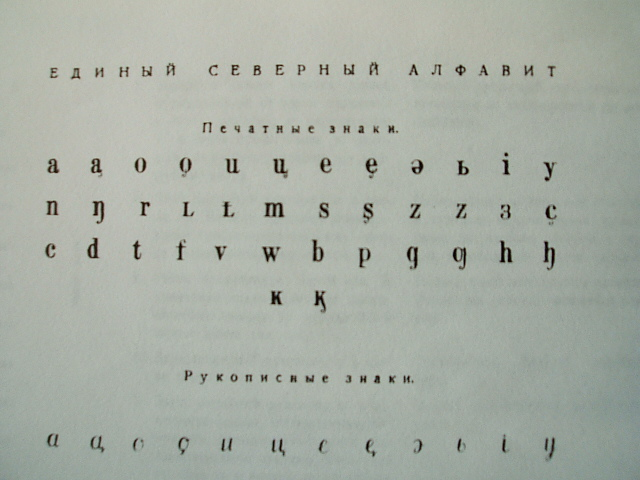
Unified Northern Alphabet, 1930

The Unified Northern Alphabet (UNA) (Russian: Единый северный алфавит, romanized: Edinyy severnyy alfavit) was a set of Latin alphabets created during the Latinisation in the Soviet Union for the "small" languages of northern Russia and used for about five years during the 1930s.

Systematic work on the development of writing in the languages of the peoples of the North began in 1926, when the Northern Faculty (known as the Institute of the Peoples of the North (IPN) since 1930) of the Leningrad Oriental Institute was established.

Alphabets were initially planned for Chukchi, Even, Evenki, Gilyak, Itelmen, Ket, Koryak, Mansi, Nanai, Nenets, Kildin Sámi, Selkup, Siberian Yupik and Udihe.

== Alphabet ==
Alphabet of 1930:

a	a̧	o	o̧	u	u̧	e	ȩ	ə	ь
i	y	n	ŋ	r	ʟ	ᴌ	m	s	ş
z	ƶ	ɜ	ç	c	d	t	f	v	w
b	p	ɡ	ƣ	h	ꜧ	ᴋ	ӄ		

Alphabet of 1932:

A a	B ʙ	C c	Ꞓ ꞓ	D d	Ʒ ʒ	Ɜ ɜ	E e	Ə ə	Æ æ
F f	G g	H h	Ꜧ ꜧ	I i	Ь ь	J j	K k	L l	Ł ł
M m	N n	Ŋ ŋ	O o	Ɵ ɵ	P p	Q q	R r	Ɍ ɍ	S s
Ꞩ ꞩ	T t	U u	V v	W w	X x	Y y	Z z	Ƶ ƶ

== Letters in use across different languages ==
The descending tail or hook beneath the letters may look like a cedilla, comma, ogonek, or extended serif, depending on the typeface.

Letter	Trans.	Kildin Sámi (a)	Kildin Sámi (b)	Nenets	Selkup	Mansi	Khanty	Evenki	Even	Nanai	Udihe	Itelmen	Chukchi	Koryak	Yupik	Aleut	Ket	Gilyak
A a	a	A a	A a Ā ā	A a Ā ā	A a Ā ā	A a	A a	A a Ā ā	A a Ā ā	A a Ā ā	A a Ā ā	A a	A a Ā ā	A a	A a	A a	A a	A a
B ʙ	b	B ʙ	B ʙ B̦ ʙ̦	B ʙ B̦ ʙ̦	B ʙ	—	—	B b	B ʙ	B ʙ	B ʙ	B ʙ B̦ ʙ̦	—	—	B ʙ B̦ ʙ̦	B ʙ	B ʙ	B ʙ
C c	c (ts)	C c		C c Ç ç	—	—	—	—	—	—	—	C c Ç ç	—	—	C c	C c	—	—
Ꞓ ꞓ (Є є)	č	Ꞓ ꞓ		—	Ꞓ ꞓ	—	Ꞓ ꞓ	Ꞓ ꞓ	Ꞓ ꞓ	Ꞓ ꞓ	Ꞓ ꞓ	—	Ꞓ ꞓ	Ꞓ ꞓ	—	—	—	Ꞓ ꞓ
D d	d	D d D̦ d̦		D d D̦ d̦	D d	—	—	D d	D d	D d	D d	D d D̦ d̦	D d	—	D d	D d	D d	D d D̦ d̦
Ʒ ʒ	dž	Ʒ ʒ		—	—	—	—	Ʒ ʒ	Ʒ ʒ	Ʒ ʒ	Ʒ ʒ	—	—	—	—	Ʒ ʒ	—	—
Ɜ ɜ	dz	Ɜ ɜ		—	—	—	—	—	—	—	—	—	—	—	—	—	—	—
E e	e	E e		E e Ē ē	E e	E e	E e	E e	E e	E e	E e Ē ē	E e	E e Ē ē	E e	E e	E e	E e	E e
Ə ə	ə	Ə ə		Ə ə Ə̄ ə̄	Ə ə	—	Ə ə	Ə ə Ə̄ ə̄	Ə ə Ə̄ ə̄	Ə ə Ə̄ ə̄	Ə ə Ə̄ ə̄	Ə ə	Ə ə Ə̄ ə̄	Ə ə	Ə ə	Ə ə	Ə ə	Ə ə
Æ æ	ä	—	Æ æ	—	Æ æ	—	—	—	—	—	Æ æ	—	—	—	—	—	Æ æ	—
F f	f	F f		—	—	—	—	—	—	—	F f	F f	—	—	F f	F f	—	F f
G g	g	G g Ģ ģ	G g	G g	G g	G g	—	G g	G g	G g	G g	G g Ģ ģ	G g	G g	G g	G g	G g	G g
H h	h	H h		H h	—	H h	H h	H h	H h	H h	H h	H h	—	—	H h	H h	H h	H h
Ꜧ ꜧ	γ	—		Ꜧ ꜧ	—	Ꜧ ꜧ	Ꜧ ꜧ	—	—	—	—	—	—	—	—	—	Ꜧ ꜧ	Ꜧ ꜧ
I i	i	I i	I i Ī ī	I i Ī ī	I i	I i	I i	I i	I i	I i Ī ī	I i Ī ī	I i	I i Ī ī	I i	I i	I i	I i	I i
Ь ь	y	Ь ь		Ь ь Ь̄ ь̄	Ь ь	Ь ь	Ь ь	—	—	—	—	Ь ь	Ь ь Ь̄ ь̄	Ь ь	Ь ь	Ь ь	Ь ь	—
J j	j	J j		J j	J j	J j	J j	J j	J j	J j	J j	J j	J j	J j	J j	J j	J j	J j
K k	k	K k Ķ ķ		K k	K k	K k	K k	K k	K k	K k	K k	K k Ķ ķ	K k	K k	K k	K k	K k	K k Kʻ kʻ
L l	l	L l Ļ ļ		L l Ļ ļ	L l Ļ ļ	L l Ļ ļ	L l Ļ ļ	L l	L l	L l	L l	L l Ļ ļ	L l	L l Ļ ļ	L l Ļ ļ	L l Ļ ļ	L l Ļ ļ	L l
Ł ł	tl	—		—	—	—	Ł ł Ł̦ ł̦		—	—	—	—	Ł ł	—	—	Ł ł	Ł ł	—
M m	m	M m M̦ m̦		M m M̦ m̦	M m	M m	M m	M m	M m	M m	M m	M m M̦ m̦	M m	M m	M m	M m	M m	M m
N n	n	N n Ņ ņ		N n Ņ ņ	N n Ņ ņ	N n Ņ ņ	N n Ņ ņ	N n Ņ ņ	N n Ņ ņ	N n Ņ ņ	N n Ņ ņ	N n Ņ ņ	N n	N n Ņ ņ	N n Ņ ņ	N n	N n Ņ ņ	N n Ņ ņ
Ŋ ŋ	ng	Ŋ ŋ		Ŋ ŋ	Ŋ ŋ	Ŋ ŋ	Ŋ ŋ	Ŋ ŋ	Ŋ ŋ	Ŋ ŋ	Ŋ ŋ	Ŋ ŋ	Ŋ ŋ	Ŋ ŋ	Ŋ ŋ	Ŋ ŋ	Ŋ ŋ	Ŋ ŋ
O o	o	O o	O o Ō ō	O o Ō ō	O o	O o	O o	O o Ō ō	O o Ō ō	O o Ō ō	O o Ō ō	O o	O o Ō ō	O o	O o	O o	O o	O o
Ɵ ɵ	ö	—		—	Ɵ ɵ	—	Ɵ ɵ	—	—	—	Ɵ ɵ	—	—	—	—	—	—	—
P p	p	P p P̦ p̦		P p P̦ p̦	P p	P p	P p	P p	P p	P p	P p	P p P̦ p̦	P p	P p	P p	P p	P p	P p Pʻ pʻ
Q q	q	—		—	Q q	—	Q q	—	—	—	—	Q q	Q q	Q q	Q q	Q q	Q q	Q q Qʻ qʻ
R r	r	R r Ŗ ŗ		R r Ŗ ŗ	R r	R r	R r	R r	R r	R r	R r	R r Ŗ ŗ	R r	R r	R r	R r	R r	R r Rʻ rʻ
Ɍ ɍ	ř	—		—	—	—	—	—	—	—	—	—	—	—	—	Ɍ ɍ	—	—
S s	s	S s Ș ș		S s Ș ș	S s	S s	S s Ș ș	S s	S s	S s	S s	S s Ș ș	S s	S s	S s Ș ș	S s	S s Ș ș	S s
Ꞩ ꞩ	š	Ꞩ ꞩ		—	Ꞩ ꞩ	Ꞩ ꞩ	Ꞩ ꞩ	—	—	—	—	—	—	—	—	—	—	—
T t	t	T t Ț ț		T t Ț ț	T t	T t Ț ț	T t Ț ț	T t	T t	T t	T t	T t Ț ț	T t	T t Ț ț	T t	T t	T t Ț ț	T t Ț ț Tʻ tʻ
U u	u	U u	U u Ū ū	U u Ū ū	U u	U u	U u	U u	U u	U u Ū ū	U u Ū ū	U u	U u Ū ū	U u	U u	U u	U u	U u
V v	v	V v V̦ v̦		—	—	V v	—	—	—	—	—	V v V̦ v̦	V v	V v	V v	V v	—	V v
W w	w	—		W w	W w	—	W w	W w	W w	W w	W w	W w	W w	W w	W w	W w	W w	—
X x	x	—	X x	—	—	—	—	—	—	—	X x	X x	—	—	X x	X x	—	X x
Y y	ü	—		—	Y y	—	Y y	—	—	—	Y y	—	—	—	—	—	—	—
Z z	z	Z z Z̦ z̦	Z z	Z z Z̦ z̦	Z z	—	—	—	—	—	Z z	Z z Z̦ z̦	—	—	Z z	—	—	Z z
Ƶ ƶ	ž	Ƶ ƶ		—	—	—	—	—	—	—	—	—	—	—	—	Ƶ ƶ	—	—

== Further development ==
From 1932, textbooks were published in the UNA. The UNA was used for fifteen out of the sixteen planned languages—all except Aleut.

After 1937, the UNA was abandoned, and those languages that were to continue to have an official writing system were to adopt Cyrillic. In practice, this spelt the end of writing for many of these minority languages; this halted their written use for decades to come.

== Reading ==
- Grenoble, L. A. (2003). Language policy in the Soviet Union (Vol. 3). Springer Science & Business Media.
- Partanen, N.; M. Rießler (2019). An OCR system for the Unified Northern Alphabet. ACL Anthology.
