= S with oblique stroke =

Letter of the Latin alphabet

- Ꞩ ꞩ
- Ꟍ ꟍ

Usage
- Writing system: Latin script
- Type: Alphabetic
- Language of origin: Latvian orthography until 1921; Lower Sorbian until 1950; Luiseño and Cupeño languages, Unified Northern Alphabet.

History
Development
Aa32M40
        - Σ σ ς
          - ς
            - 𐌔
              - S s
                - Ꞩ ꞩ
- Variations: Ꟍ ꟍ

Latvian S with stroke on the left, Luiseño and Cupeño S with stroke on the right.

Ꞩ, ꞩ, ẜ (S with oblique stroke) is an extended Latin letter that was used in Latvian orthography until 1921; ꞩ was also used in Lower Sorbian until 1950. A variant of the letter S with a stroke, encoded at U+A7CC Ꟍ LATIN CAPITAL LETTER S WITH DIAGONAL STROKE and U+A7CD ꟍ LATIN SMALL LETTER S WITH DIAGONAL STROKE, is used in Luiseño and Cupeño, and has been encoded since Unicode 16.0.

== Uses in alphabets ==
In Latvian orthography until 1921 it meant the sound [s] (while the S s meant the sound [z]). It was also used in the trigraph Ꞩch ẜch and the tetragraph Tẜch tẜch, denoted by the sounds [ʃ] and [t͡ʃ], respectively. Spelling reform Ꞩ ẜ ꞩ, Ꞩch ẜch, Tẜch tẜch were replaced by S s, Š š, Č č respectively.

In the final version of the Unified Northern Alphabet, created in the USSR in the 1930s for the languages of the peoples of Siberia and the Far North, for the Selkup, Khanty and Mansi languages, it meant the sound [ʃ].

== Code positions ==
The forms are represented in Unicode as:

- U+A7A8 Ꞩ LATIN CAPITAL LETTER S WITH OBLIQUE STROKE
- U+A7A9 ꞩ LATIN SMALL LETTER S WITH OBLIQUE STROKE

The long s form with the bar (diacritic) is encoded at:

- U+1E9C ẜ LATIN SMALL LETTER LONG S WITH DIAGONAL STROKE
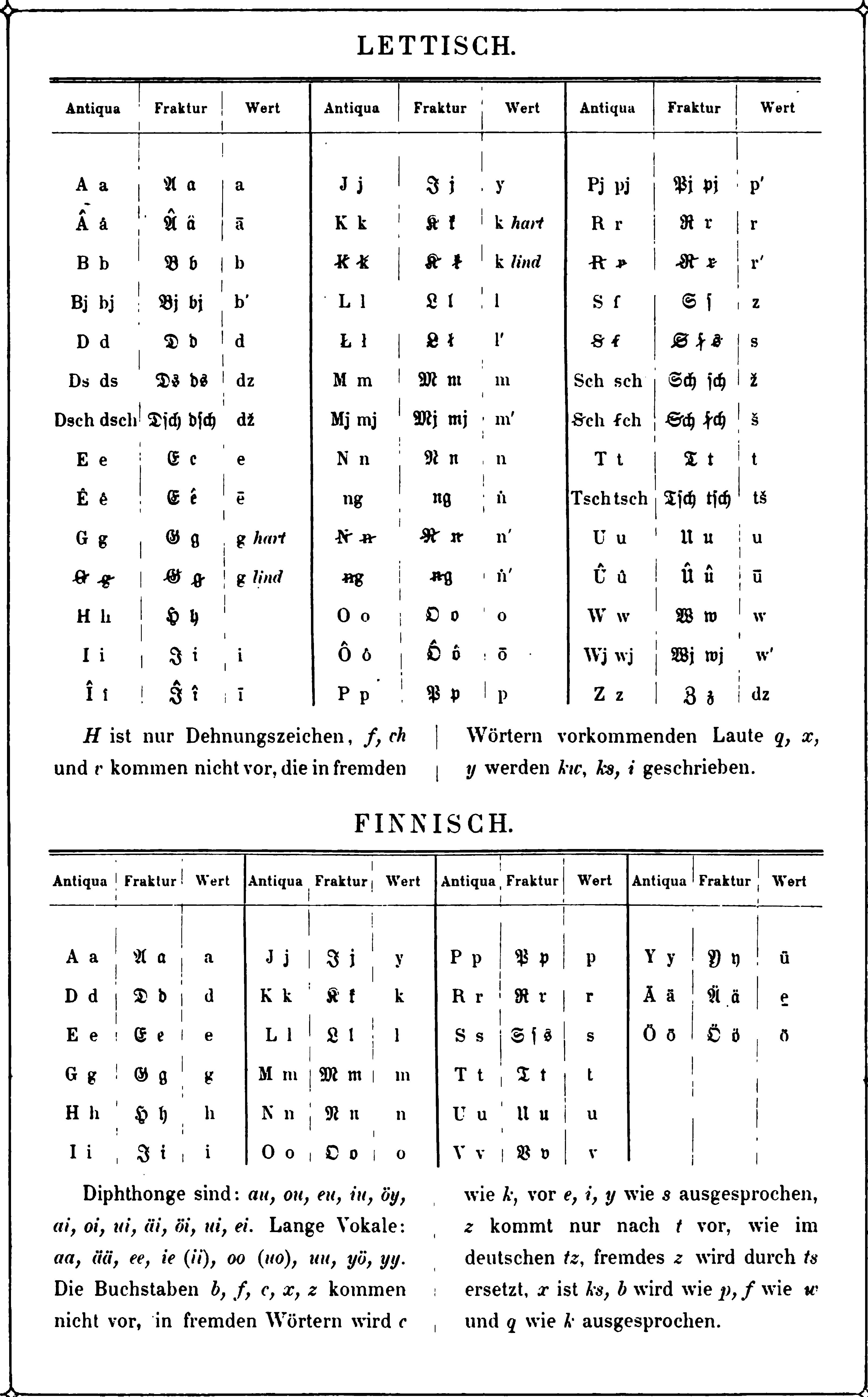
Latvian alphabet before 1921 (upper)

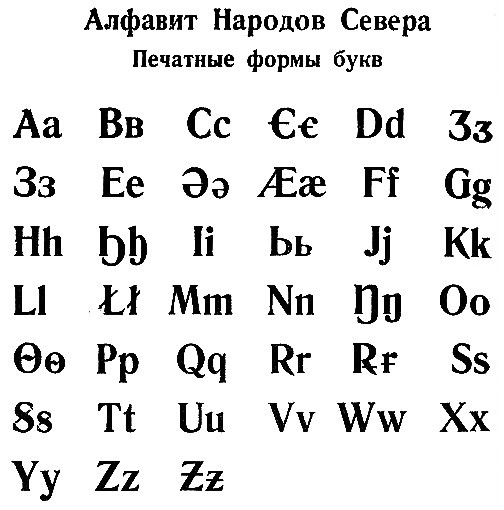
Unified northern alphabet

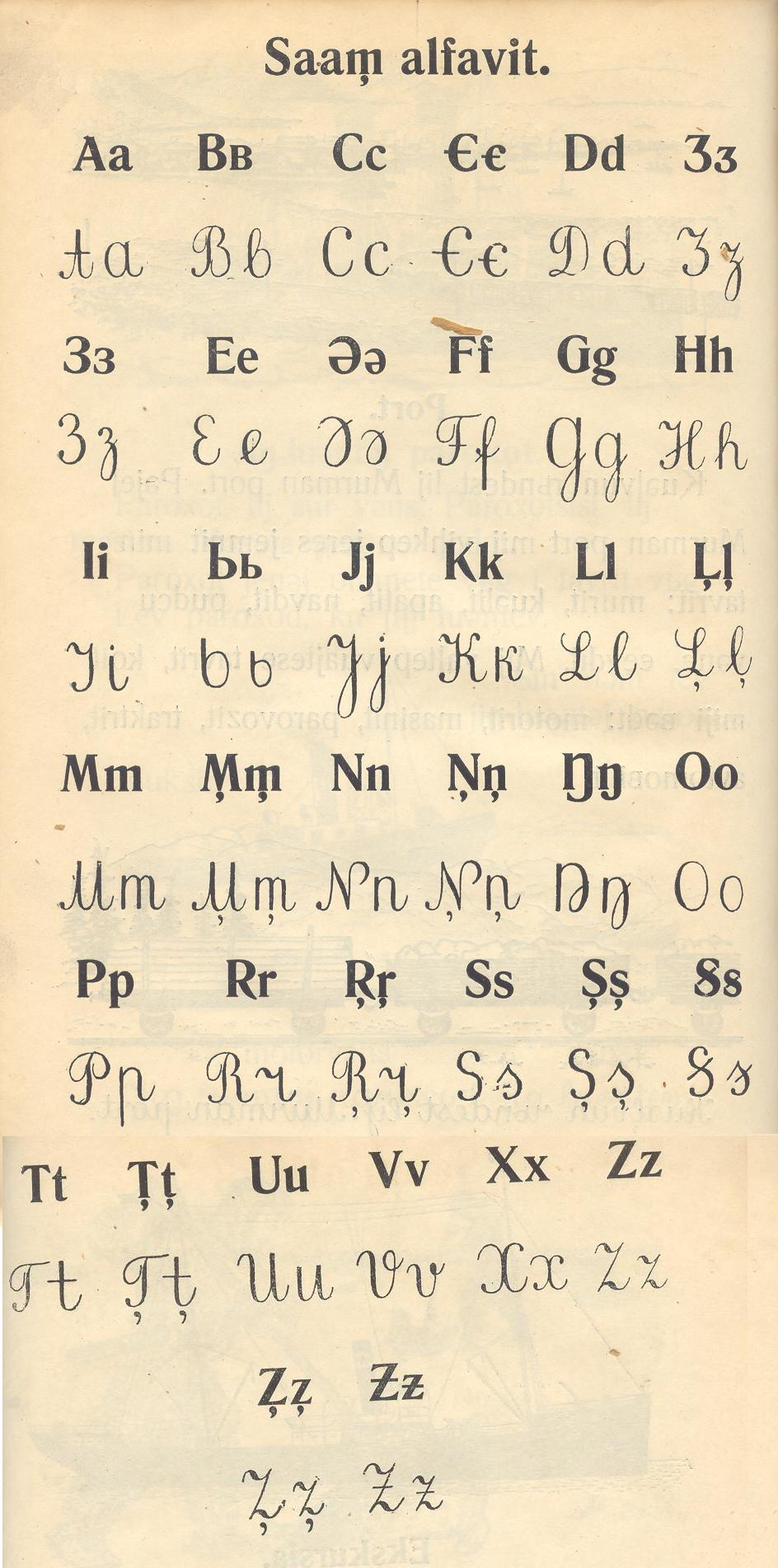
Sami alphabet. 1933 version

== See also ==
- Unified Northern Alphabet
