= Small capital B =

Additional letter of the Latin alphabet

- ʙ

Usage
- Writing system: Latin script
- Type: Alphabetic
- Language of origin: International Phonetic Alphabet, Uralic Phonetic Alphabet
- Sound values: /b/, /ʙ/
- In Unicode: U+0299

ʙ (small capital B) is an extended Latin letter used as the lowercase form of B in a number of alphabets during romanization. It is also used in the International Phonetic Alphabet to denote a voiced bilabial trill. In the Uralic Phonetic Alphabet, it denotes a semi-voiced bilabial plosive.

== Use ==
To avoid the appearance of a homoglyph with the letter I with bowl (not encoded in Unicode, but approximated with the Cyrillic soft sign ⟨Ь ь⟩), during Soviet latinisation, the alphabets of the Sámi, Abaza, Komi, Tsakhur, Azerbaijani, Kurdish and Bashkir languages, as well as the New Turkic alphabet, the Unified Northern Alphabet and the project of reform of the Udmurt script used ⟨ʙ⟩ as the lowercase form of the letter ⟨B⟩. The letter also was used in the Adyghe Latin alphabet and is still used in the Bukharian Latin alphabet, though neither contains homoglyphs being avoided.

In the Middle Ages, the author of the First Icelandic Grammatical Treatise used ⟨ʙ⟩ to transcribe a geminated B.

In the International Phonetic Alphabet, ⟨ʙ⟩ represents a voiced bilabial trill. The symbol was adopted following the 1989 Kiel Convention.

In the Uralic Phonetic Alphabet, ⟨ʙ⟩ represents a partially devoiced bilabial plosive, approximately [b̥] in the IPA; ⟨b⟩ and ⟨p⟩ represent fully voiced and fully devoiced bilabial plosives, respectively, in both systems.

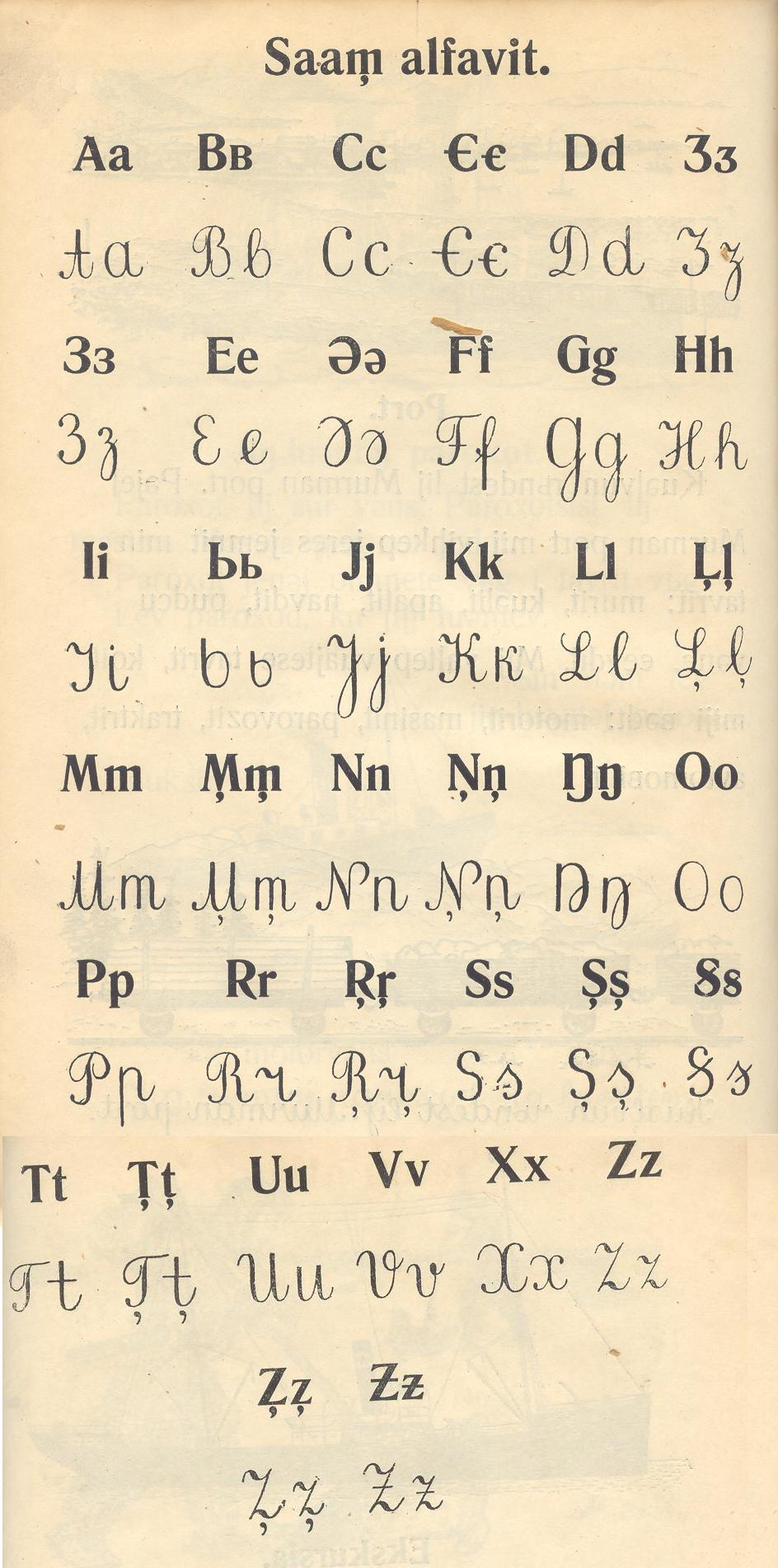
The Sámi alphabet in 1933

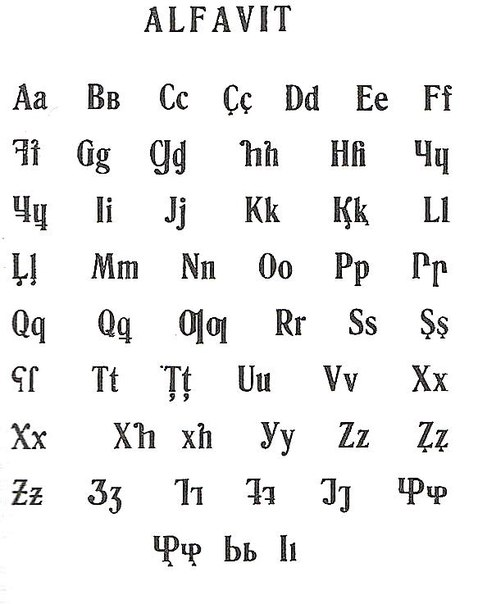
Abaza alphabet of the 1930s

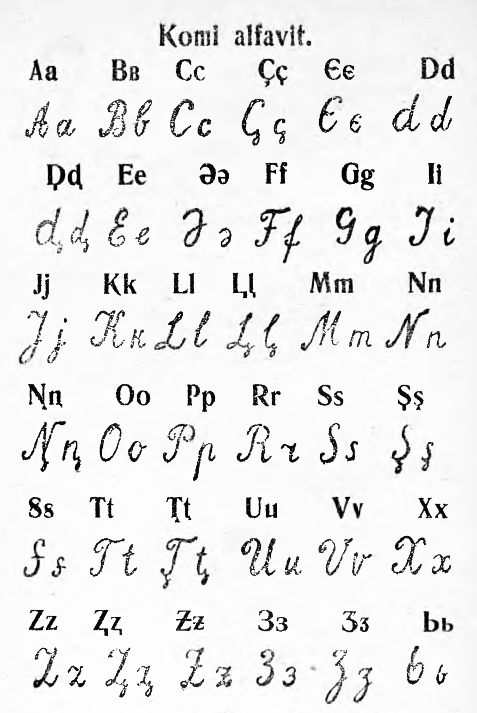
Komi Alphabet in 1934

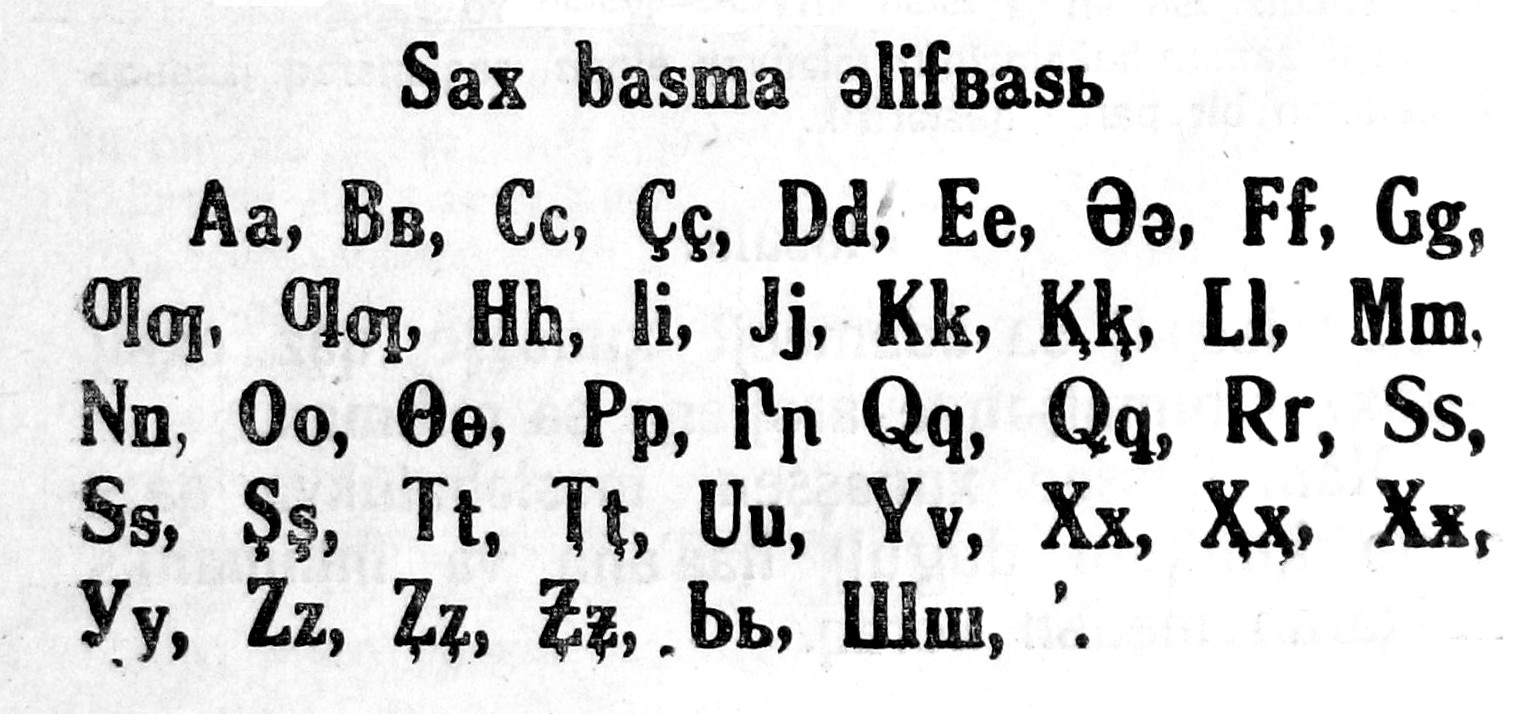

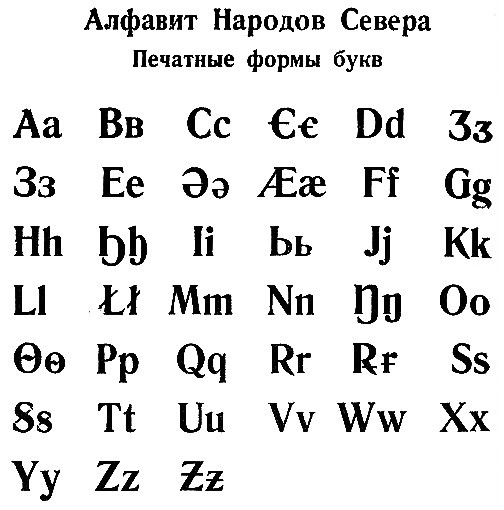

== Unicode ==
The letter has been present since the very first version of the Unicode standard and is located in the IPA Extensions block as code point U+0299 ʙ LATIN LETTER SMALL CAPITAL B.

== Computing codes ==
Character information
Preview	ʙ	
Unicode name	LATIN LETTER SMALL CAPITAL B	
Encodings	decimal	hex
Unicode	665	U+0299
UTF-8	202 153	CA 99
Numeric character reference	&#665;	&#x299;

== See also ==
- B (the Latin letter)
- Ve (Cyrillic), В
- List of Latin letters
- Small capital letters
