= Heng (letter) =

Letter of the Latin alphabet

- Ꜧ ꜧ

Usage
- Writing system: Latin script
- Type: Alphabetic
- Language of origin: Unified Northern Alphabet
- Sound values: [ɮ]; [j̊]; [ɦ]; [h]; [ŋ]; [ɴ]; [ɣ]; [x]; [χ]
- In Unicode: U+A726,U+A727

Heng is a letter of the Latin alphabet, originating as a typographic ligature of h and ŋ. It was originally used for a voiceless [j]-like sound in Dania transcription of the Danish language (in Dania, it is considered a ligature of h and j).

Heng was used word-finally in early transcriptions of Mayan languages, where it may have represented a uvular fricative.

It is sometimes used to write Judeo-Tat.

Heng has been occasionally used by phonologists to represent a jocular phoneme in English, which includes both [h] and [ŋ] as its allophones, to illustrate the limited usefulness of minimal pairs to distinguish phonemes. /h/ and /ŋ/ are separate phonemes in English, even though no minimal pair for them exists due to their complementary distribution.

Heng is also used in Bantu linguistics to indicate a voiced alveolar lateral fricative [ɮ]. Heng was also historically used in the IPA for this sound, and later a compromise form between the two symbols ⟨⟩ was used.

== Variants and forms ==
Forms of heng
Majuscule	Minuscule	Description
		Forms with an uppercase based on H
		Forms with the stem, bowl and loop based on the lowercase form; used in the Unified Northern Alphabet and some other Latin alphabets of the Soviet Union.
		Form used in some Chechen and Ingush typefaces in the 1920s and 1930s.

Both U+A726 Ꜧ LATIN CAPITAL LETTER HENG and U+A727 ꜧ LATIN SMALL LETTER HENG are encoded in Unicode block Latin Extended-D; they were added with Unicode version 5.1 in April 2008. The superscript U+AB5C ꭜ MODIFIER LETTER SMALL HENG is in Latin Extended-E, added in Unicode 7.0 in June 2014. As of 2026, a proposed latin capital letter enlarged small heng for remains unencoded.

A variant form, U+0267 ɧ LATIN SMALL LETTER HENG WITH HOOK, is encoded as part of the IPA Extensions Block. It is used to represent the voiceless palatal-velar fricative in the International Phonetic Alphabet. U+10797 𐞗 MODIFIER LETTER SMALL HENG WITH HOOK is used as a superscript IPA letter.

== See also ==
- Ŋ ŋ – Latin letter Eng
- Ӈ ӈ – Cyrillic letter En with hook
- Unified Northern Alphabet
