= Ñ =

Latin letter N with tilde above

Eñe
- Ñ ñ

Usage
- Writing system: Latin script
- Type: Alphabetic
- Language of origin: Spanish language
- Sound values: [ɲ] [ŋ]
- In Unicode: U+00D1, U+00F1
- Alphabetical position: 15

History
Development
I10
          - Ν ν
            - 𐌍
              - N
                - Ñ ñ
- Time period: ~1000 to present
- Transliterations: gn (French, Italian) nh (Portuguese, Occitan, Vietnamese) ny (Catalan, Aragonese, Hungarian, Indonesian, Malay, Filipino) nj (Serbo-Croatian (Latin), Albanian) њ (Serbo-Croatian (Cyrillic))

Other
- Writing direction: Left-to-Right

Ñ (minuscule: ñ) (Spanish: eñe [ˈeɲe]) is a letter of the extended Latin alphabet, formed by placing a tilde (also referred to as a virgulilla in Spanish, in order to differentiate it from other diacritics, which are also called tildes) on top of an upper- or lower-case ⟨n⟩. The origin dates back to medieval Spanish, when the Latin digraph ⟨nn⟩ began to be abbreviated using a single ⟨n⟩ with a roughly wavy line above it, and it eventually became part of the Spanish alphabet in the eighteenth century, when it was first formally defined.

Since then, it has been adopted by other languages, such as Aragonese, Asturian, Basque, Chavacano, several Philippine languages (especially Filipino and the Bisayan group), Chamorro, Galician, Guarani, Quechua, Mapudungun, Mandinka, Papiamento, and Tetun. It also appears in the Latin transliteration of Tocharian and many Indian languages, where it represents [ɲ] or [nʲ] (similar to the ⟨ny⟩ in canyon). Additionally, it was adopted in Crimean Tatar, Kazakh, ALA-LC romanization for Turkic languages, the Common Turkic Alphabet, Nauruan, and romanized Quenya, where it represents the phoneme [ŋ] (like the ⟨ng⟩ in wing). It has also been adopted in both Breton and Rohingya, where it indicates the nasalization of the preceding vowel.

Unlike many other letters that use diacritics (such as ⟨ü⟩ in Catalan and Spanish and ⟨ç⟩ in Catalan), ⟨ñ⟩ in Spanish, Galician, Basque, Asturian, Leonese, Guarani and Filipino is considered a letter in its own right, has its own name (Spanish: eñe), and its own place in the alphabet (after ⟨n⟩). Its alphabetical independence is similar to the Germanic ⟨w⟩, which came from a doubled ⟨v⟩.

== History ==
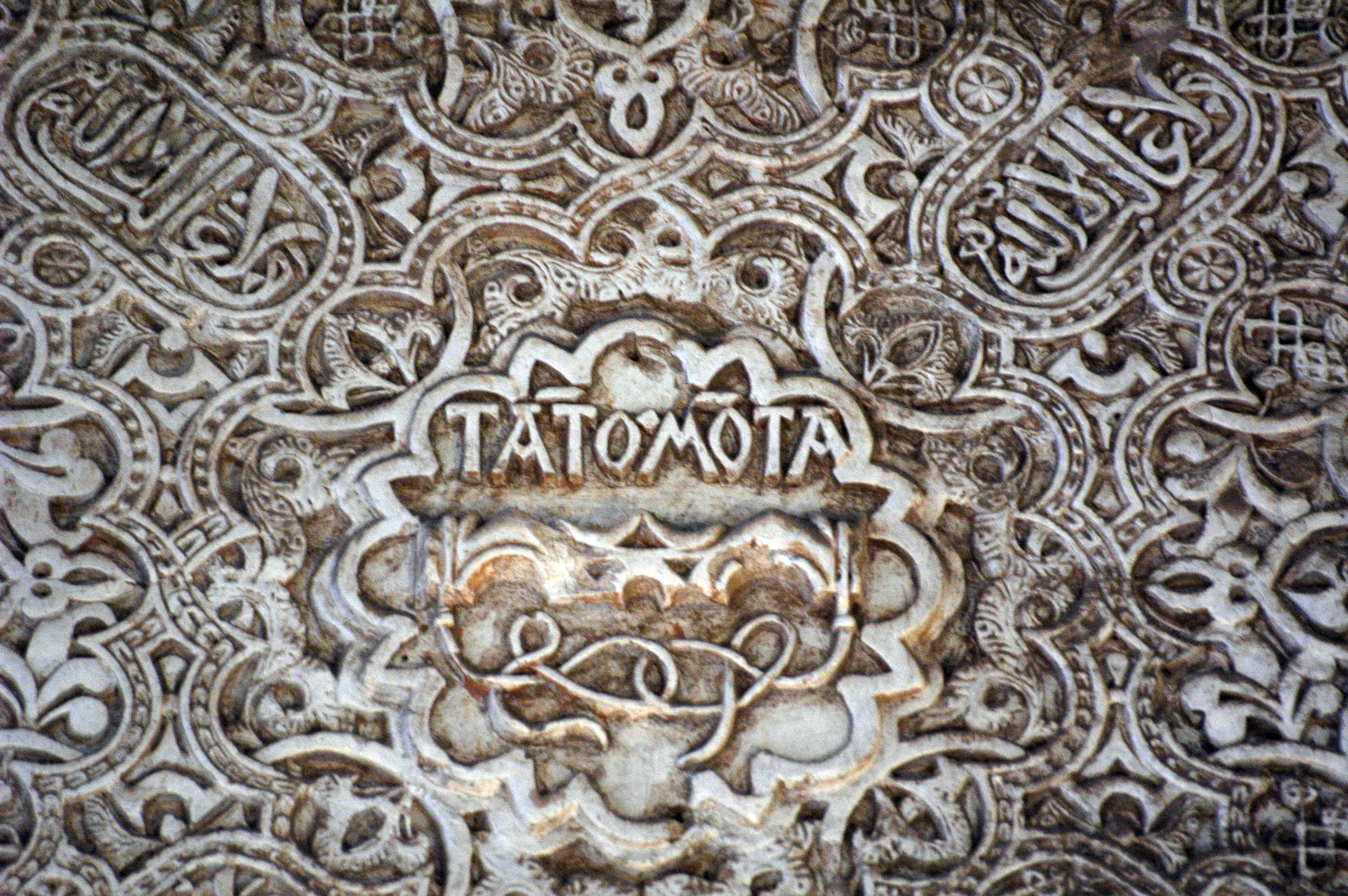
In medieval times, ⟨~⟩ was a shorthand for an ⟨n⟩. Thus, this inscription is read "Tanto monta" ("it amounts as much"). It was engraved in Alhambra after Reconquista by the Catholic Monarchs, meaning that both Queen Isabella I of Castile and King Ferdinand II of Aragon were equivalent in power ("Tanto monta, monta tanto, Isabel como Fernando").

Historically, ⟨ñ⟩ arose as a ligature of ⟨nn⟩; the tilde was shorthand for the second ⟨n⟩, written over the first; compare umlaut, of analogous origin. It is a letter in the Spanish alphabet that is used for many words—for example, the Spanish word año "year" (⟨anno⟩ in Old Spanish) derived from Latin: annus. Other languages used the macron over an ⟨n⟩ or ⟨m⟩ to indicate simple doubling.

Already in medieval Latin palaeography, the sign that in Spanish came to be called virgulilla ("little comma") was used over a vowel to indicate a following nasal consonant (⟨n⟩ or ⟨m⟩) that had been omitted, as in tãtus for tantus or quã for quam. This usage was passed on to other languages using the Latin alphabet although it was subsequently dropped by most. Spanish retained it, however, in some specific cases, particularly to indicate the palatal nasal, the sound that is now spelt as ⟨ñ⟩. The word tilde comes from Spanish, derived by metathesis of the word título as tidlo, this originally from Latin TITVLVS "title" or "heading"; compare cabildo with Latin CAPITVLVM.

From spellings of anno abbreviated as año, as explained above, the tilde was thenceforth transferred to the ⟨n⟩ and kept as a useful expedient to indicate the new palatal nasal sound that Spanish had developed in that position: año. The sign was also adopted for the same palatal nasal in all other cases, even when it did not derive from an original ⟨nn⟩, as in leña (from Latin ligna) or señor (from Latin SENIOR).

Other Romance languages have different spellings for this sound: Italian and French use ⟨gn⟩, a consonant cluster that had evolved from Latin, whereas Occitan and Portuguese chose ⟨nh⟩ and Catalan ⟨ny⟩ even though these digraphs had no etymological precedent.

When Morse code was extended to cover languages other than English, a sequence ( — — · — — ) was allotted for this character.

Although ⟨ñ⟩ is used by other languages whose spellings were influenced by Spanish, it originated in Spanish and has become a distinctive symbol of the language's identity.

== Cross-linguistic usage ==
In Spanish it represents a palatal nasal. This is also the case of Philippine languages, Aymara, Basque, Bubi language, Chamorro, Guarani, Leonese, Mapudungún, Quechua, and Yavapai, whose orthographies have some basis in that of Spanish as their areas were controlled by Spain at one point. It is also used in Tetun and Iñupiaq with the same phonetic value. Many languages of Senegal also use it in the same way. Senegal is unique among countries of West Africa in using this letter.

It also represents a palatal nasal in Galician and Uruguayan Portuguese.

In Tetun, it was adopted to represent the same sound in Portuguese loanwords represented by ⟨nh⟩, although this is also used in Tetun, as is ⟨ny⟩, influenced by Indonesian.

In Tagalog, Visayan, and other Philippine languages, most Spanish terms that include ⟨ñ⟩ are respelled with ⟨ny⟩. The conventional exceptions (with considerable variations) are proper names, which usually retain ⟨ñ⟩ and their original Spanish or Hispanicised spelling (Santo Niño, Parañaque, Mañalac, Malacañan). It is collated as the 15th letter of the Filipino alphabet. In old Filipino orthography, the letter was also used, along with ⟨g⟩, to represent [ŋ] (except at the end of a word, when ⟨ng⟩ would be used) if appropriate instead of a tilde, which originally spanned a sequence of ⟨n⟩ and ⟨g⟩ (as in ⟨n͠g⟩), such as pan͠galan ("name"). That is because the old orthography was based on Spanish, and without the tilde, pangalan would have been pronounced with the sequence [ŋɡ] (therefore pang-GAlan). The form ⟨ñg⟩ became a more common way to represent ⟨n͠g⟩ until the early 20th century, mainly because it was more readily available in typesets than the tilde spanning both letters.

It is also used to represent the velar nasal in Crimean Tatar and Nauruan. In Malay, the Congress Spelling System (1957–1972) formerly used it for /ŋ/ before /ɡ/. In Turkmen, it was used for /ŋ/ until 1999. In Latin-script writing of the Tatar language and Lule Sámi language, ⟨ñ⟩ is sometimes used as a substitute for ꞑ (Tatar) or ŋ (Lule Sámi), which is not available on many computer systems. In addition to Tatar, ⟨ñ⟩ represents /ŋ/ in the Common Turkic Alphabet.

In the Breton language, it nasalises the preceding vowel, as in Jañ /ʒã/, which corresponds to the French name Jean and has the same pronunciation.

It is used in a number of English terms of Spanish origin, such as jalapeño, piña colada, piñata, and El Niño. The Spanish word cañón, however, became naturalized as canyon (though in British English it is occasionally spelt cañon). Until the middle of the 20th century, adapting it as nn was more common in English, as in the phrase "Battle of Corunna". Now, it is almost always left unmodified.

== Cultural significance ==
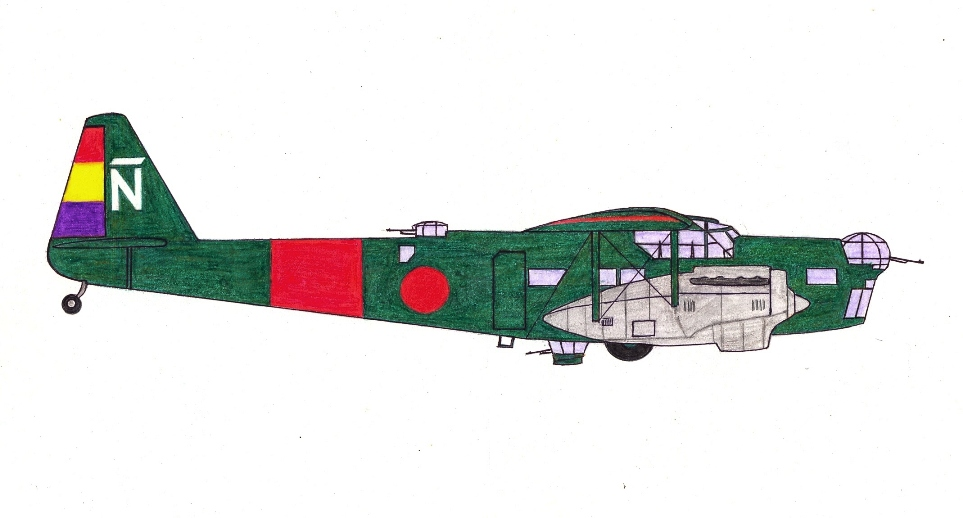
Serial letter 'Ñ' Potez 540 plane of the Spanish Republican Air Force

⟨ñ⟩ has come to represent the identity of the Spanish language. Latin publisher Bill Teck labeled Hispanic culture and its influence on the United States "Generation Ñ" and later started a magazine with that name. Organizations such as the Instituto Cervantes and the National Association of Hispanic Journalists have adopted the letter as their mark for Hispanic heritage. It was used in the Spanish Republican Air Force for aircraft identification. The circumstances surrounding the crash of serial 'Ñ' Potez 540 plane that was shot down over the Sierra de Gúdar range of the Sistema Ibérico near Valdelinares inspired French writer André Malraux to write the novel L'Espoir (1937), translated into English as Man's Hope and made into the movie named Espoir: Sierra de Teruel.

In 1991, a European Community report recommended the repeal of a regulation preventing the sale in Spain of computer products not supporting "all the characteristics of the Spanish writing system," claiming that it was a protectionist measure against the principles of the free market. This would have allowed the distribution of keyboards without an "Ñ" key. The Real Academia Española stated that the matter was a serious attack against the language. Nobel Prize winner in literature Gabriel García Márquez expressed his disdain over its elimination by saying: "The 'Ñ' is not an archaeological piece of junk, but just the opposite: a cultural leap of a Romance language that left the others behind in expressing with only one letter a sound that other languages continue to express with two."

⟨ñ⟩ used in the word piñata

Among other forms of controversy are those pertaining to the anglicization of Spanish surnames. The replacement of ⟨ñ⟩ with another letter alters the pronunciation and meaning of a word or name, in the same manner that replacing any letter in a given word with another one would. For example, Peña is a common Spanish surname and a common noun that means "rocky hill"; it is often anglicized as Pena, changing the name to the Spanish word for "pity", often used in terms of sorrow.

When Federico Peña was first running for mayor of Denver in 1983, the Denver Post printed his name without the tilde as "Pena." After he won the election, they began printing his name with the tilde. As Peña's administration had many critics, their objections were sometimes whimsically expressed as "ÑO."

Since 2011, CNN's Spanish-language news channel incorporates a new logo wherein a tilde is placed over both ⟨n⟩.

Another news channel, TLN en Español, has ⟨tlñ⟩, with ⟨ñ⟩ taking the place of the expected ⟨n⟩, as its logo.

As part of April Fool's Day, in 2013, Puerto Rican linguistics professor Aida Vergne penned a mock newspaper article stating that the Royal Spanish Academy had opted to eliminate ⟨ñ⟩ from Spanish, instead being replaced by the original ⟨nn⟩ in Old Spanish. As the Academy had previously eliminated letters such as ⟨ch⟩ and ⟨ll⟩, such an allegation was taken seriously and occasionally the Academy has to resort to deny and clarify the allegation.

The Google Doodle for 23 April 2021 celebrated ⟨ñ⟩ as part of UN Spanish Language Day.

== Computer usage ==
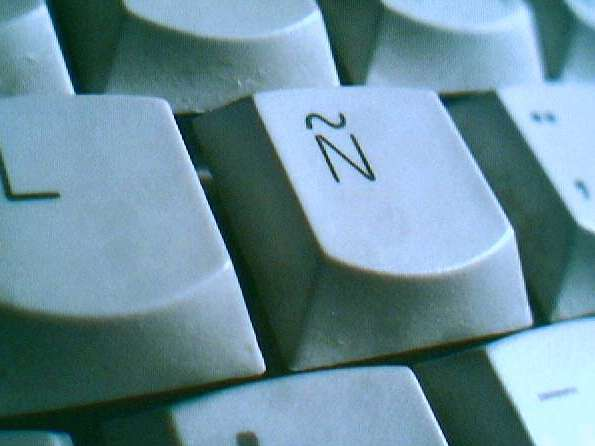
⟨ñ⟩ is to the right of ⟨L⟩ on a Spanish keyboard layout.

=== Unicode ===
- U+00D1 Ñ LATIN CAPITAL LETTER N WITH TILDE
- U+00F1 ñ LATIN SMALL LETTER N WITH TILDE

⟨ñ⟩ has its own key in the Spanish and Latin American keyboard layouts (see the corresponding sections at keyboard layout and Tilde#Role of mechanical typewriters). (For other keyboards, see Unicode input).

=== Use in URLs ===
⟨ñ⟩ may be used in internationalized domain names, but it will have to be converted from Unicode to ASCII using Punycode during the registration process (i.e. from www.piñata.com to www.xn--piata-pta.com).

== See also ==
- Tilde
- English terms with diacritical marks

=== Other symbols for the palatal nasal ===
- Gn (digraph)
- Nh (digraph)
- Nj (letter)
- Ny (digraph)
- Ɲ
- Ń
- Њ
- Ň
- ɲ (IPA symbol)

=== Other letters with tilde ===
- Ã
- Ẽ
- G̃
- Ĩ
- M̃
- Õ
- P̃
- Ũ
- Ṽ
