= Nje =

Cyrillic letter

- Њ њ

Usage
- Writing system: Cyrillic
- Type: Alphabetic
- Language of origin: Serbian; Itelmen; Udege
- Sound values: [ɲ]

History
- Transliterations: Nj nj

Handwritten cursive form of Nje

Nje (Њ њ; italics: Њ њ) is a letter of the Cyrillic script.

It is a ligature of the Cyrillic letters En ⟨н⟩ and Soft Sign ⟨ь⟩. It was invented by Vuk Stefanović Karadžić for Serbian Cyrillic use in his 1818 dictionary, replacing the earlier digraph ⟨нь⟩. It corresponds to the digraph ⟨nj⟩ in Gaj's Latin alphabet for Serbo-Croatian.

It is today used in Serbian, Itelmen and Udege, where it represents a palatal nasal /ɲ/, similar to the ⟨ny⟩ in "canyon" (cf. Polish ⟨ń⟩, Czech and Slovak ⟨ň⟩, Latvian ⟨ņ⟩, Galician, Spanish and Filipino ⟨ñ⟩, Occitan, Portuguese and Vietnamese ⟨nh⟩, Catalan and Hungarian ⟨ny⟩, and Italian and French ⟨gn⟩).

Nje is commonly transliterated as nj but it is also transliterated ń, ň, ñ, or ņ.

== Related letters and other similar characters ==
- Н н : Cyrillic letter En
- Ь ь : Cyrillic letter Soft sign
- Ñ ñ : Latin letter N with tilde - a Filipino, Spanish, and Tetum letter
- Ń ń : Latin letter N with acute - a Kashubian, Polish, and Sorbian letter
- Ň ň : Latin letter N with caron - a Czech, Turkmen, and Slovak letter
- Ņ ņ : Latin letter N with cedilla - a Latvian letter
- Љ љ : Cyrillic letter Lje
- Ԋ ԋ - Cyrillic letter Komi Nje
- Ԩ ԩ : Cyrillic letter En with left hook - an Uilta letter
- Ǌ ǋ ǌ : Unicode compatibility characters

== Computing codes ==
Character information
Preview	Њ		њ	
Unicode name	CYRILLIC CAPITAL LETTER NJE		CYRILLIC SMALL LETTER NJE	
Encodings	decimal	hex	dec	hex
Unicode	1034	U+040A	1114	U+045A
UTF-8	208 138	D0 8A	209 154	D1 9A
Numeric character reference	&#1034;	&#x40A;	&#1114;	&#x45A;
Named character reference	&NJcy;		&njcy;	
Code page 855	147	93	146	92
Windows-1251	140	8C	156	9C
ISO-8859-5	170	AA	250	FA
Macintosh Cyrillic	190	BE	191	BF
IBM880	112	70	82	52

== See also ==
- Iotation
