= Nj (digraph) =

Latin-script digraph

- Ǌ ǋ ǌ

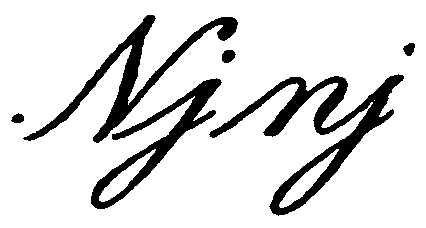

Usage
- Language of origin: Serbo-Croatian

History
Development
(speculated origin)
  I10 D36
            - Ν ν Ι ι
              - 𐌍𐌉
                - N n I i
                  - N n J j
                    - Ǌ ǋ ǌ
- Transliterations: Њ њ

Nj (titlecase form; all-capitals form NJ, lowercase nj) is a digraph of the Latin script. It is present in South Slavic languages such as the Gaj's Latin alphabet of Serbo-Croatian, in which case it may be treated as a letter. It is also used in romanised Macedonian, and in the Albanian alphabet. In all of these languages, it represents the palatal nasal /ɲ/, like the pronunciation of ⟨gn⟩ in Dom Pérignon. For example, the Serbo-Croatian word konj is pronounced /koɲ/.

In Serbo-Croatian, the digraph is treated as a single letter, and therefore it has its own place in the alphabet (as the 20th letter, following N), takes up only one space in crossword puzzles, and is written in line in vertical text. However, it does not have its own key in standard computer keyboards as it is almost never represented by a single character. When the letter is the initial of a capitalised word (such as Njiva or Njuh, or proper nouns like Njutn or Njofra), only N is written in uppercase; when the whole word is written in uppercase the j is capitalised as well.

Other letters and digraphs of the Latin alphabet used for spelling this sound are ń (in Polish), ň (in Czech and Slovak), ñ (in Spanish), nh (in Portuguese and Occitan), gn (in French and Italian), ņ (in Latvian and Livonian), and ny (in Hungarian, Catalan, and among many African languages). The Cyrillic alphabet also includes a specific symbol, constructed in a similar fashion as nj: Њ.

In Faroese, it generally represents /ɲ/, although in some words it represents /nj/, like in banjo.

Ljudevit Gaj first used this digraph in 1830.

It is also used in some languages of Africa and Oceania where it represents a prenazalized voiced postalveolar affricate or fricative, /ⁿdʒ/ or /ⁿʒ/. In Malagasy, it represents /ⁿdz/.

The digraph Nj is encoded in Unicode at 3 precomposed code points.

- U+01CA Ǌ LATIN CAPITAL LETTER NJ
- U+01CB ǋ LATIN CAPITAL LETTER N WITH SMALL LETTER J
- U+01CC ǌ LATIN SMALL LETTER NJ

== See also ==
- Њ, the Cyrillic version of Nj
- Gaj's Latin alphabet
