= Ň =

Latin letter N with caron

N with caron

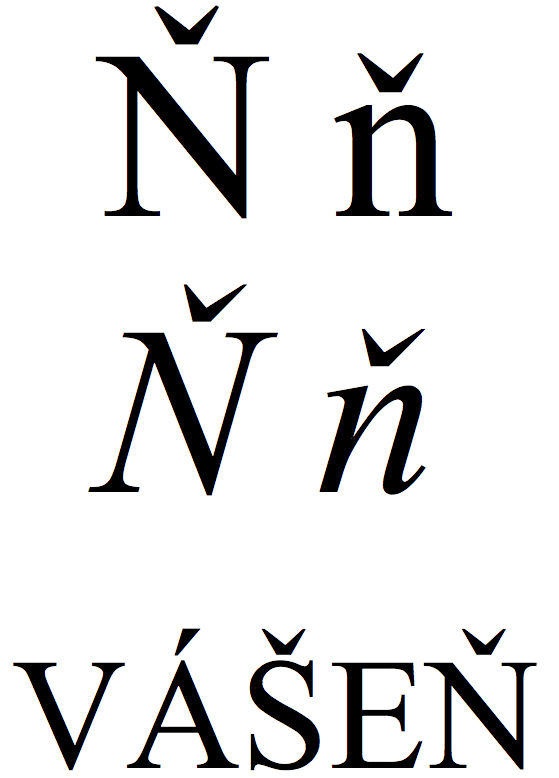
Latin small and capital letter n with caron, and the word "vášeň" (passion)

The grapheme Ň (minuscule: ň) is a letter in the Czech, Slovak and Turkmen alphabets. It is formed from Latin N with the addition of a caron (háček in Czech and mäkčeň in Slovak) and follows plain N in the alphabet. Ň and ň are at Unicode codepoints U+0147 and U+0148, respectively.

== /ɲ/ ==
In Czech and Slovak, ň represents /ɲ/, the palatal nasal, similar to the sound in English canyon. Thus, it has the same function as Albanian, Macedonian and Serbo-Croatian nj / њ, French and Italian gn, Catalan and Hungarian ny, Polish ń, Occitan and Portuguese nh, Galician and Spanish ñ, Latvian and Livonian ņ and Belarusian, Russian, Rusyn and Ukrainian нь.

In the 19th century, it was used in Croatian for the same sound.

In Slovak, ne is pronounced ňe. In Czech, this syllable is written ně. In Czech and Slovak, ni is pronounced ňi. In Russian, Ukrainian and similar languages, soft vowels (е, и, ё, ю, я) also change previous н to нь in pronunciation.

== /ŋ/ ==
In Turkmen, ň represents the sound /ŋ/, the velar nasal, as in English thing. In Turkmen's Cyrillic script, this corresponds to the letter Ң ң (En with descender). In Janalif, it corresponds to the letter Ꞑ ꞑ (N with descender). In other Turkic languages with the velar nasal, it corresponds to the letter Ñ ñ (N with tilde).

It is also used in Sorani and Southern Kurdish to represent the same sound.

== Computing codes ==
Character information
Preview	Ň		ň	
Unicode name	LATIN CAPITAL LETTER N WITH CARON		LATIN SMALL LETTER N WITH CARON	
Encodings	decimal	hex	dec	hex
Unicode	327	U+0147	328	U+0148
UTF-8	197 135	C5 87	197 136	C5 88
Numeric character reference	&#327;	&#x147;	&#328;	&#x148;
Named character reference	&Ncaron;		&ncaron;	
ISO 8859-2	147	93	148	94

== See also ==
- Czech orthography
- Czech phonology
- Slovak orthography
- Slovak phonology
