= N =

Fourteenth letter of the Latin alphabet

- N n

Usage
- Writing system: Latin script
- Type: Alphabetic and logographic
- Language of origin: Latin language
- Sound values: [n] [ŋ] [ɴ] [ɱ] [ɲ] [ɳ] [nˠ] [ⁿ] [◌̃]
- In Unicode: U+004E, U+006E
- Alphabetical position: 14

History
Development
I10
        - Ν ν
            - 𐌍
              - N n
- Time period: c. 700 BCE to present
- Descendants: ₦; Ƞ; Ŋ; ɧ; ʩ
- Sisters: Н; Ң; Ӊ; Ӈ; Ԋ; נ, ן, ن, ܢ; ނ; Ն ն; Մ մ; ࠍ; ነ; ᚾ; Ꮋ; Ꮑ; Ꮓ

Other
- Associated graphs: n(x), nh, ng, ny
- Writing direction: Left-to-right

N (minuscule: n) is the fourteenth letter of the Latin alphabet, used in the modern English alphabet, the alphabets of other Western European languages, and others worldwide. Its name in English is en (pronounced /ˈɛn/), plural ens.

== History ==
Egyptian hieroglyph	Phoenician Nun	Western Greek Nu	Etruscan N	Latin N
D				Latin N

One of the most common hieroglyphs, snake, was used in Egyptian writing to stand for a sound like the English ⟨J⟩, because the Egyptian word for "snake" was djet. It is speculated by some, such as archeologist Douglas Petrovich, that Semitic speakers working in Egypt adapted hieroglyphs to create the first alphabet.

Some hold that they used the same snake symbol to represent N, with a great proponent of this theory being Alan Gardiner, because their word for "snake" may have begun with n (an example of a possible word being nahash). However, this theory has become disputed. The name for the letter in the Phoenician, Hebrew, Aramaic, and Arabic alphabets is nun, which means "fish" in some of these languages. This possibly connects the letter to the hieroglyph for a water ripple, which phonetically makes the n sound. The sound value of the letter was /n/—as in Greek, Etruscan, Latin, and modern languages.

== Use in writing systems ==
Pronunciation of ⟨n⟩ by language
Orthography	Phonemes
Catalan	/n/
Standard Chinese (Pinyin)	/n/
English	/n/, /ŋ/, silent
French	/n/ or /◌̃/
German	/n/, /ŋ/
Portuguese	/n/ or /◌̃/
Spanish	/n/
Turkish	/n/

=== English ===
In English, ⟨n⟩ usually represents a voiced alveolar nasal /n/, but can represent other nasal consonants due to assimilation. For example, before a velar plosive (as in ink or jungle), ⟨n⟩ represents a voiced velar nasal /ŋ/.

⟨n⟩ is generally silent when it is preceded by an ⟨m⟩ at the end of words, as in hymn; however, it is pronounced in this combination when occurring word medially, as in hymnal. Other consonants are often silent when they precede an ⟨n⟩ at the beginning of an English word. Examples include gnome, knife, mnemonic, and pneumonia.

The letter N is the sixth-most common letter and the second-most commonly used consonant in the English language (after ⟨t⟩).

=== Other languages ===
The letter ⟨n⟩ represents a voiced dental nasal /n̪/ or voiced alveolar nasal /n/ in virtually all languages that use the Latin alphabet. In many languages, these nasal consonants assimilate with the consonant that follows them to produce other nasal consonants.

In Italian and French, ⟨gn⟩ represents a palatal nasal /ɲ/. The Portuguese and Vietnamese spelling for this sound is ⟨nh⟩, while Spanish, Breton, and a few other languages use the letter ⟨ñ⟩.

A common digraph with ⟨n⟩ is ⟨ng⟩, which represents a voiced velar nasal /ŋ/ in a variety of languages.

=== Other systems ===
In the International Phonetic Alphabet, ⟨n⟩ represents the voiced alveolar nasal /n/.

== Other uses ==
- In mathematics, the italic form n is a particularly common symbol for a variable quantity which represents a natural number. The set of natural numbers is referred to as $\mathbb{N}$.

== Related characters ==
=== Descendants and related characters in the Latin alphabet ===
- N with diacritics: Ń ń Ñ ñ Ň ň Ǹ ǹ Ṅ ṅ Ṇ ṇ Ņ ņ Ṉ ṉ Ṋ ṋ Ꞥ ꞥ ᵰ ᶇ
- Phonetic alphabet symbols related to N (the International Phonetic Alphabet only uses lowercase, but uppercase forms are used in some other writing systems):
  - Ŋ ŋ : Latin letter eng, which represents a velar nasal in the IPA
  - 𝼔 : Small letter eng with palatal hook, which is used in phonetic transcription
  - 𝼇 : Small letter reversed eng, which is an extension to IPA for disordered speech (extIPA)
  - Ɲ ɲ : Latin letter Ɲ, which represents a palatal nasal or an alveolo-palatal nasal in the IPA
  - ⁿ : Superscript small n, which represents a nasal release in the IPA
  - Ƞ ƞ : Latin letter Ƞ (encoded in Unicode as "N with long right leg"), a mostly obsolete letter used to transcribe various nasal sounds
  - ɳ : Latin letter n with a hook, which represents a retroflex nasal in the IPA
  - ᶯ : Modifier letter small n with retroflex hook
  - ᶮ : Modifier letter small n with left hook
  - ɴ : Small capital N, which represents a uvular nasal in the IPA
  - ᶰ : Modifier letter small capital N
- Uralic Phonetic Alphabet-specific symbols related to N:
  - U+1D0E ᴎ LATIN LETTER SMALL CAPITAL REVERSED N
  - U+1D3A ᴺ MODIFIER LETTER CAPITAL N
  - U+1D3B ᴻ MODIFIER LETTER CAPITAL REVERSED N
  - U+1D51 ᵑ MODIFIER LETTER SMALL ENG
- _{n} : Subscript small n was used in the Uralic Phonetic Alphabet prior to its formal standardization in 1902
- The Teuthonista phonetic transcription system uses U+AB3B ꬻ LATIN SMALL LETTER N WITH CROSSED-TAIL and U+AB3C ꬼ LATIN SMALL LETTER ENG WITH CROSSED-TAIL
- ȵ : N with curl is used in Sino-Tibetanist linguistics
- Ꞑ ꞑ : N with descender
  Small letter n with mid-height left hook was used by the British and Foreign Bible Society in the early 20th century for romanization of the Malayalam language.

=== Ancestors and siblings in other alphabets ===
- 𐤍 : Semitic letter Nun, from which the following symbols originally derive:
  - Ν ν : Greek letter Nu, from which the following symbols originally derive:
    - Ⲛ ⲛ : Coptic letter Ne
    - Н н : Cyrillic letter En
    - 𐌍 : Old Italic N, which is the ancestor of modern Latin N
    - 𐌽 : Gothic letter nauþs

=== Derived signs, symbols and abbreviations ===
- ₦ : Nigerian Naira

== Other representations ==
=== Computing ===
- U+004E N LATIN CAPITAL LETTER N
- U+006E n LATIN SMALL LETTER N
- U+FF2E Ｎ FULLWIDTH LATIN CAPITAL LETTER N
- U+FF4E ｎ FULLWIDTH LATIN SMALL LETTER N

=== Other ===
NATO phonetic	Morse code
November	▄▄▄ ▄

Signal flag

Flag semaphore
American manual alphabet (ASL fingerspelling)
British manual alphabet (BSL fingerspelling)
Braille dots-1345
Unified English Braille

== See also ==
- U+0418 И CYRILLIC CAPITAL LETTER I
- U+1D0E ᴎ LATIN LETTER SMALL CAPITAL REVERSED N – phonetic symbol
- N-dash – Dash as wide as the letter N
- Alphabets
