= Tetun language =

Austronesian language spoken on Timor

Tetun
- Tetun
- Native to: Indonesia; Timor-Leste
- Ethnicity: Tetun
- Native speakers: 500,000, mostly in Indonesia (2010–2011)
- Language family: Austronesian: Malayo-Polynesian; Central–Eastern; Timor–Babar; Tetunic; Tetun
- Dialects: Belunese (Tetun Belu); Terik (Tetun Terik)

Official status
- Official language in: Timor-Leste
- Recognised minority language in: Indonesia (East Nusa Tenggara)

Language codes
- ISO 639-2: tet
- ISO 639-3: tet
- Glottolog: tetu1245
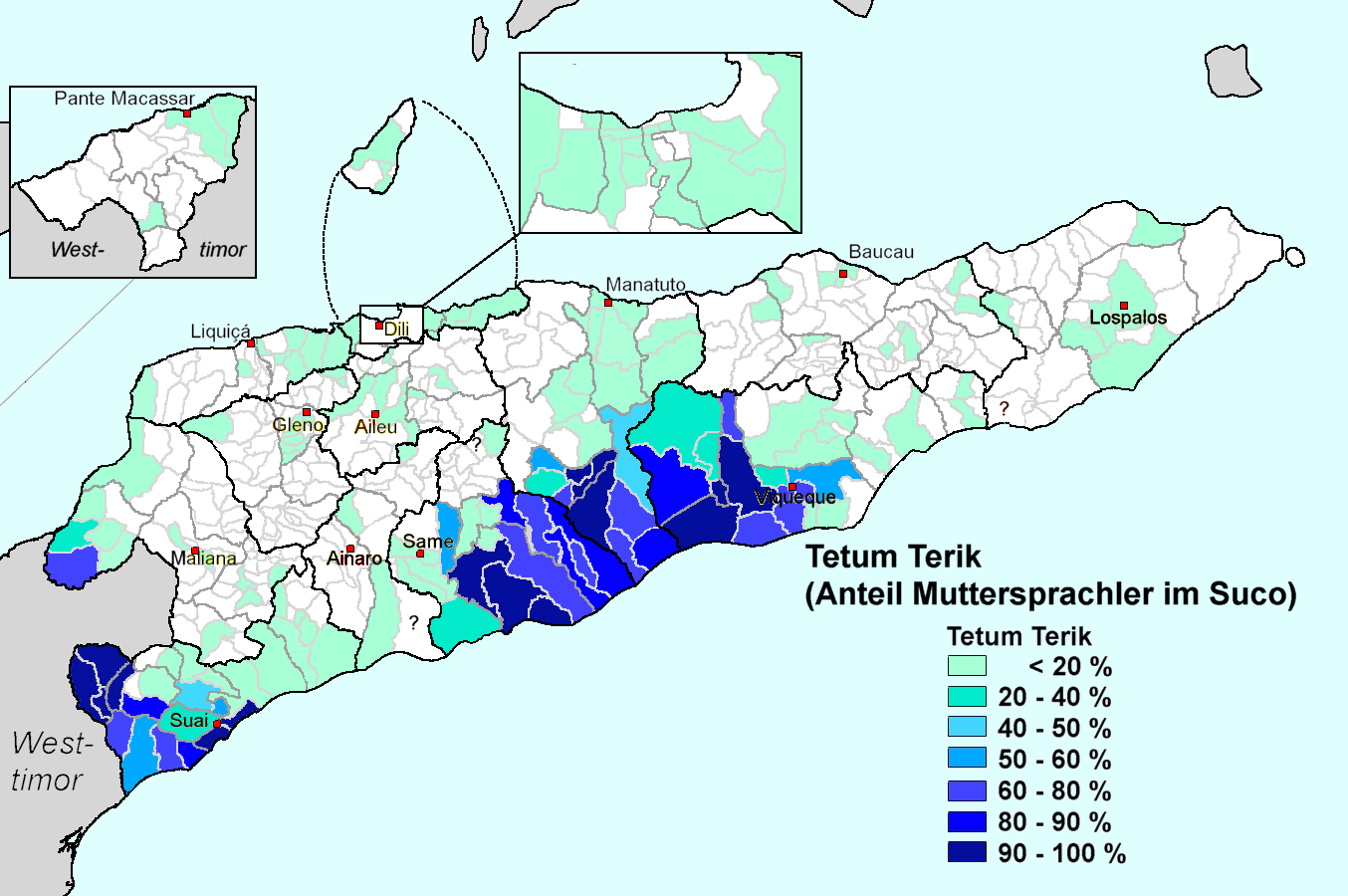
- Distribution in Timor-Leste of Tetun Belu (west) and Tetun Terik (southeast). The majority of Tetun speakers, who live in West Timor, are not shown.

Tetun Dili
- Tetun Prasa; Portuguese: Tétum Praça
- Tetun Dili, Tetun Prasa
- Native to: Timor-Leste
- Native speakers: 390,000 (2009); L2: 570,000 in East Timor
- Language family: Austronesian: Malayo-Polynesian; Central–Eastern; Timor–Babar; Tetunic; Tetun Dili
- Dialects: Belunese (Tetun Belu); Terik (Tetun Terik)
- Writing system: Latin (Tetun alphabet)

Official status
- Official language in: Timor-Leste
- Regulated by: National Institute of Linguistics

Language codes
- ISO 639-3: tdt
- Glottolog: tetu1246
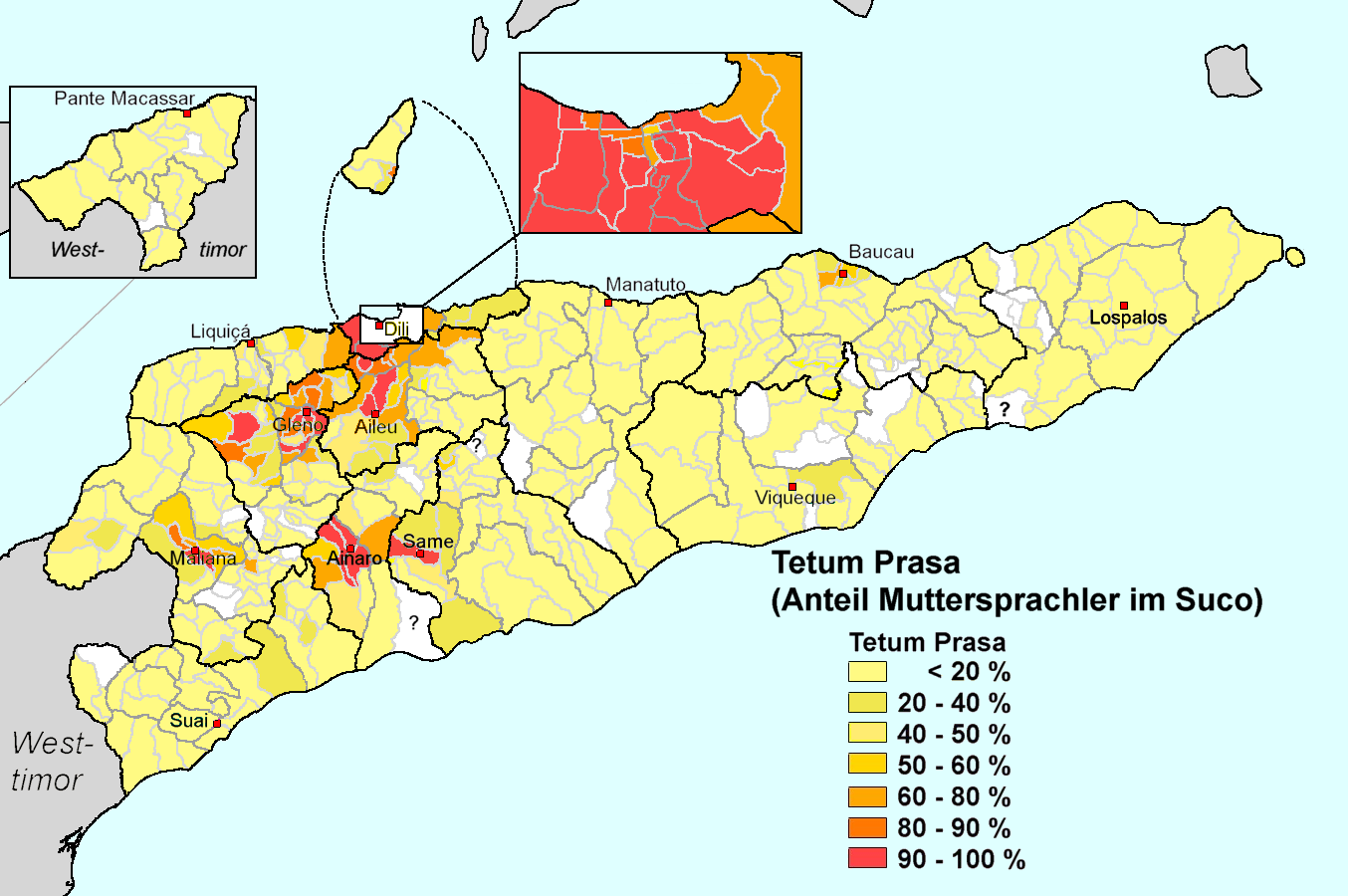
- Distribution of Tetun Prasa mother-tongue speakers in Timor-Leste

Tetun (Tetun [ˈt̪et̪un̪]; Indonesian: Bahasa Tetun; Portuguese: Tétum [ˈtɛtũ]) is an Austronesian language spoken on the island of Timor. It is one of the official languages of Timor-Leste and it is also spoken in Belu Regency and Malaka Regency, which form the eastern part of Indonesian West Timor adjoining Timor-Leste.

There are two main forms of Tetun as a language:

- Tetun Terik, which is a more indigenous form of Tetun marked by different word choice, less foreign influence and other characteristics such as verb conjugation
- Tetun Prasa ('market Tetun', from the Portuguese word praça meaning 'town square') or Tetun Dili (given its widespread usage in the capital Dili). This is the form of Tetun (heavily influenced by Portuguese) that developed in Dili during colonial rule as local Tetun speakers came into contact with Portuguese missionaries, traders and colonial rulers. In Timor-Leste, Tetun Dili is widely spoken fluently as a second language.

Ethnologue classifies Tetun Terik as a dialect of Tetun. However, without previous contact, Tetun Dili is not immediately mutually intelligible, mainly because of the large number of Portuguese origin words used in Tetun Dili. Besides some grammatical simplification, Tetun Dili has been greatly influenced by the vocabulary and to a small extent by the grammar of Portuguese, the other official language of Timor-Leste.

== History and dialects ==
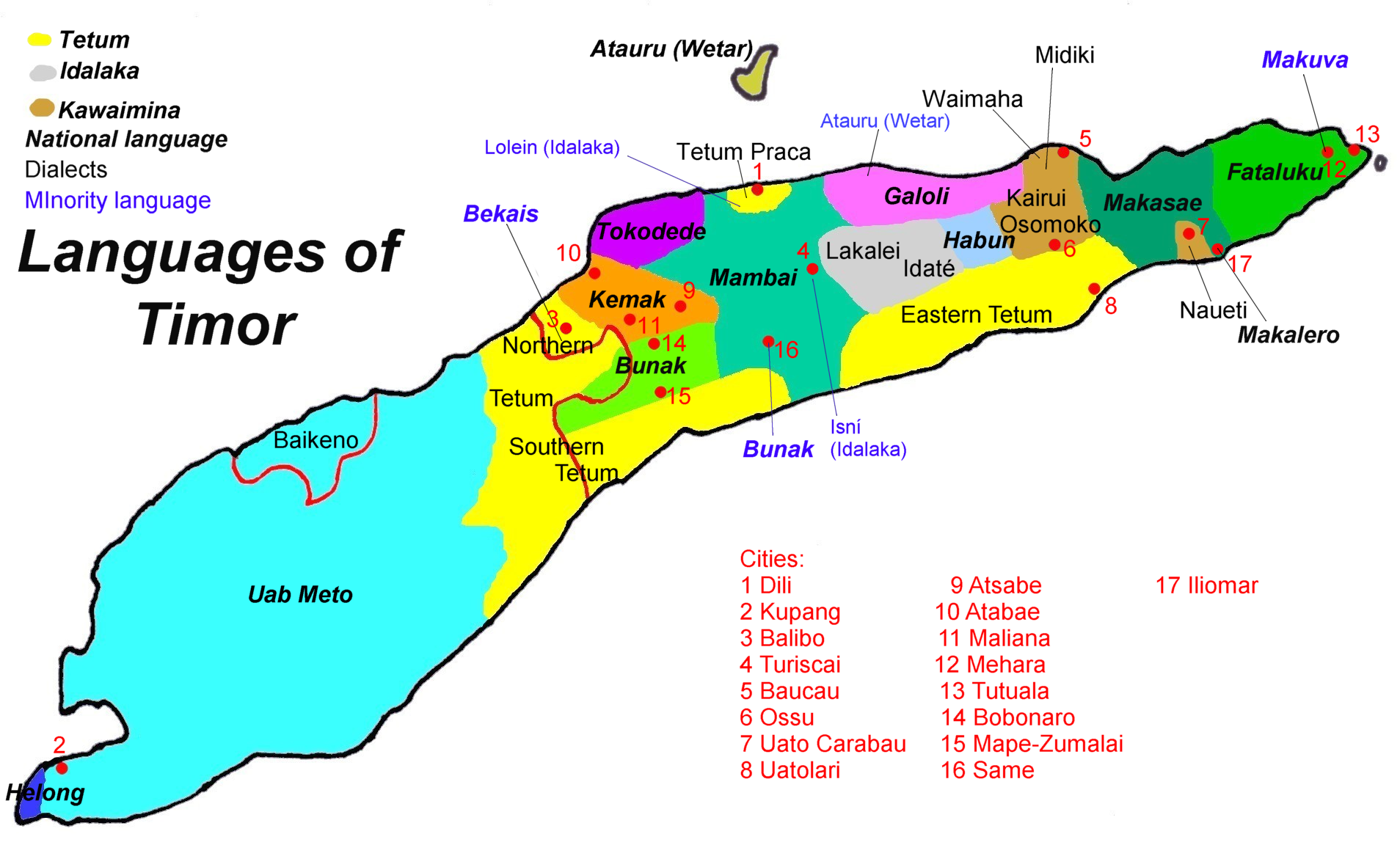
Languages of Timor Island. Tetun is in yellow.

According to linguist Geoffrey Hull, Tetun has four dialects:

- Tetun-Dili, or Tetun-Prasa (literally 'city Tetun'), is spoken in the capital, Dili, and its surroundings, in the north of the country. Because of its simpler grammar than other varieties of Tetun, extensive Portuguese loanwords, and supposed creole-like features, Ethnologue and some researchers classify it as a Tetun-based creole. This position, however, is also disputed in that while Tetun-Dili may exhibit simpler grammar, this does not mean that Tetun-Dili is a creole. (Note: Catharina Williams-van Klinken states otherwise,) According to Ethnologue, there were 50,000 native Tetun-Dili speakers in Timor-Leste in 2004 and 370,000 L2 users.
- Tetun-Terik is spoken in the south and southwestern coastal regions. According to Ethnologue, there were 50,000 Tetun-Terik speakers in East Timor in 1995.
- Tetun-Belu, or the Belunese dialect, is spoken in a central strip of the island of Timor from the Ombai Strait to the Timor Sea, and is split between Timor-Leste and West Timor, where it is considered a bahasa daerah or 'regional language', with no official status in Indonesia, although it is used by the Diocese of Atambua in Roman Catholic rites.
- The Nana'ek dialect is spoken in the village of Metinaro, on the coastal road between Dili and Manatuto.

Tetun-Belu and Tetun-Terik are not spoken outside their home territories. Tetun-Prasa is the form of Tetun that is spoken throughout Timor-Leste. Although Portuguese was the official language of Portuguese Timor until 1975, Tetun-Prasa has always been the predominant lingua franca in the eastern part of the island.

In the fifteenth century, before the arrival of the Portuguese, Tetun had spread through central and eastern Timor as a contact language under the aegis of the Belunese-speaking Kingdom of Wehali, at that time the most powerful kingdom in the island. The Portuguese (present in Timor from c. 1556) made most of their settlements in the west, where Dawan was spoken, and it was not until 1769, when the capital was moved from Lifau (Oecusse) to Dili that they began to promote Tetun as an inter-regional language in their colony. Timor was one of the few Portuguese colonies where a local language, and not a form of Portuguese, became the lingua franca: this is because Portuguese rule was indirect rather than direct, the Europeans governing through local kings who embraced Catholicism and became vassals of the King of Portugal.

Following the Carnation Revolution in Portugal in 1974, Indonesia invaded East Timor, declaring it "the Republic's 27th Province". The use of Portuguese was banned, and Indonesian was declared the sole official language, but the Roman Catholic Church adopted Tetun as its liturgical language, making it a focus for cultural and national identity. After the United Nations Transitional Administration in East Timor (UNTAET) took over governance in 1999, Tetun (Dili) was proclaimed the country's official language, even though according to Encarta Winkler Prins it was only spoken by about 8% of the native population at the time, while the elite (consisting of 20 to 30 families) spoke Portuguese and most adolescents had been educated in Indonesian. When Timor-Leste gained its independence in 2002, Tetun and Portuguese were declared as official languages. The 2010 census found that Tetun Prasa had 385,269 native speakers on a total population of 1,053,971, meaning that the share of native Tetun Prasa/Dili speakers had increased to 36.6% during the 2000s.

In addition to regional varieties of Tetun in Timor-Leste, there are variations in vocabulary and pronunciation, partly due to Portuguese and Indonesian influence. The Tetun spoken by East Timorese migrants living in Portugal and Australia are more Portuguese-influenced, as many of those speakers were not educated in Indonesian.

== Vocabulary ==
=== Indigenous ===
The Tetun name for Timor-Leste is Timór Lorosa'e, which means 'Timor of the rising sun', or, more directly, 'East Timor'; lorosa'e comes from loro 'sun' and sa'e 'to rise, to go up'. The noun for 'word' is liafuan, from lia 'voice' and fuan 'fruit'. Some more words in Tetun:

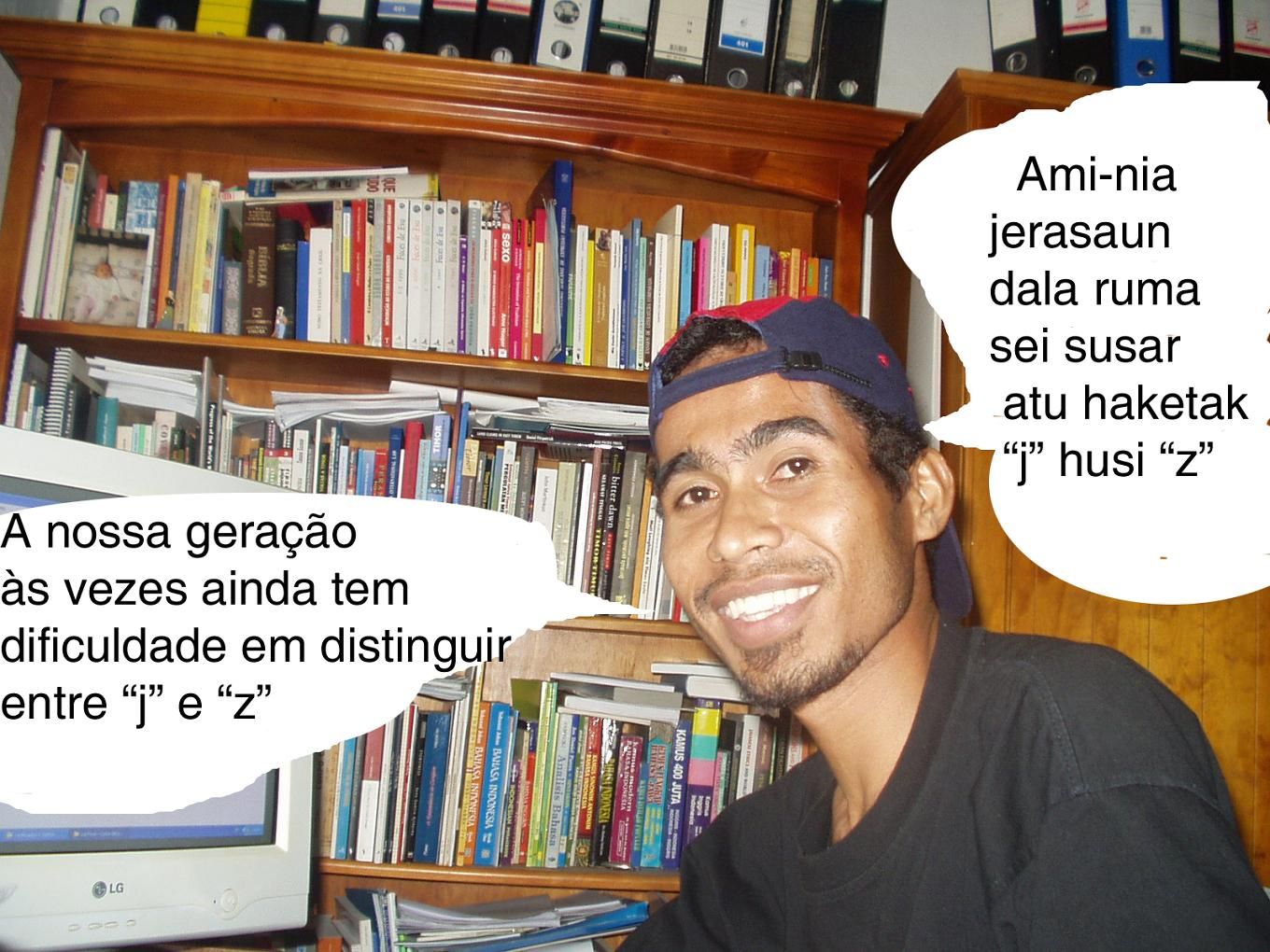
Portuguese (left) and Tetun (right). From a Portuguese course for Tetun speakers. The text says: "Our generation sometimes has difficulty distinguishing between 'j' and 'z'"

- aas – 'high'
- aat – 'bad'
- ai – 'tree'
- ai-fuan – 'fruit'
- ai-manas – 'spice'
- bee – 'water'
- belun – 'friend'
- boot – 'big'
- di'ak – 'good'
- domin – 'love'
- ema – 'person, people'
- fatin – 'place'
- feto – 'woman'
- foho – 'mountain'
- fulan – 'moon/month'
- funu – 'war'
- hamlaha – 'hungry'
- haan – 'eat'
- hahán – 'food'
- hemu – 'drink'
- hotu – 'all'
- ida – 'one'
- kalan – 'night'
- ki'ik – 'little'
- kraik – 'low'
- labarik – 'child'
- lafaek – 'crocodile'
- lais – 'fast'
- lalenok – 'mirror'
- laran – 'inside'
- lia – 'language'
- liafuan – 'word' (from lian 'voice' and fuan 'fruit')
- lian – 'voice', 'language'
- loos – 'true', 'tebes' also acts as a synonym.
- loron – 'day'
- lokraik – 'afternoon'
- tauk – 'scared'
- mane – 'man'
- maromak – 'god'
- moris – 'life'
- rai – 'country'
- tasi – 'sea'
- tinan – 'year'
- tebes – 'very'
- teen – 'dirt', 'sediment'
- tos – 'hard'
- uluk – 'first'
- ulun – 'head'

=== From Portuguese ===
Words derived from Portuguese:

- adeus – 'goodbye'
- ajuda – 'help'
- aprende – 'learn', from aprender
- arkitetura – 'architecture', from arquitetura
- arkuiris – 'rainbow', from arco-íris
- aviaun – 'airplane', from avião
- demais – 'too much'
- desizaun – 'decision', from decisão
- deskulpa – 'sorry', from desculpa
- doutor – 'doctor'
- edukasaun – 'education', from educação
- ekipamentu – 'equipment', from equipamento
- eletrisidade – 'electricity', from electricidade
- embaixada – 'embassy'
- emerjensia – 'emergency', from emergência
- enjeñaria – 'engineering', from engenharia
- entaun – 'so', 'well', from então
- envezde 'instead of', from em vez de
- eskola – 'school', from escola
- esperiénsia – 'experience', from experiência
- familia – 'family', from família
- fízika – 'physics', from física
- forsa – 'force', from força
- froñas – 'pillowcases', from fronhas
- gitarrista – 'guitarist', from guitarrista
- governu – 'government', from governo
- ideia – 'idea'
- igreja – 'church'
- imposivel – 'impossible', from impossível
- istória – 'history', from história
- jerasaun – 'generation', from geração
- kafé – 'coffee', from café
- kaisaun – 'coffin', from caixão
- keiju – 'cheese', from queijo
- kompañia – 'company', from companhia
- komprende – 'understand', from compreender
- konsulta – 'consultation', from consulta
- korrupsaun – 'corruption', from corrupção
- kuandu – 'when', from quando
- mensajen – 'message', from mensagem
- menus – 'less', from menos
- milagre – 'miracle'
- mundu – 'world', from mundo
- múzika – 'music', from música
- Natál – 'Christmas', from Natal
- obrigadu/a – 'thanks', from obrigado/a
- organizasaun – 'organization', from organização
- pasadu – 'past', from passado
- pasaporte – 'passport', from passaporte
- paun – 'bread', from pão
- pergunta – 'question'
- polísia – 'police', from polícia
- povu – 'people', from povo
- prezidente – 'president', from presidente
- profesór – 'teacher', from professor
- profisaun – 'profession', from profissão
- relijiaun – 'religion', from religião
- semana – 'week'
- serbisu – 'work', from serviço
- serveja – 'beer', from cerveja
- teknolojia – 'technology', from tecnologia
- televizaun – 'television', from televisão
- tenke – 'must', from tem que
- tendénsia – 'tendency', from tendência
- terrorizmu – 'terrorism', from terrorismo
- xefe – 'chief', from chefe

=== From Malay ===
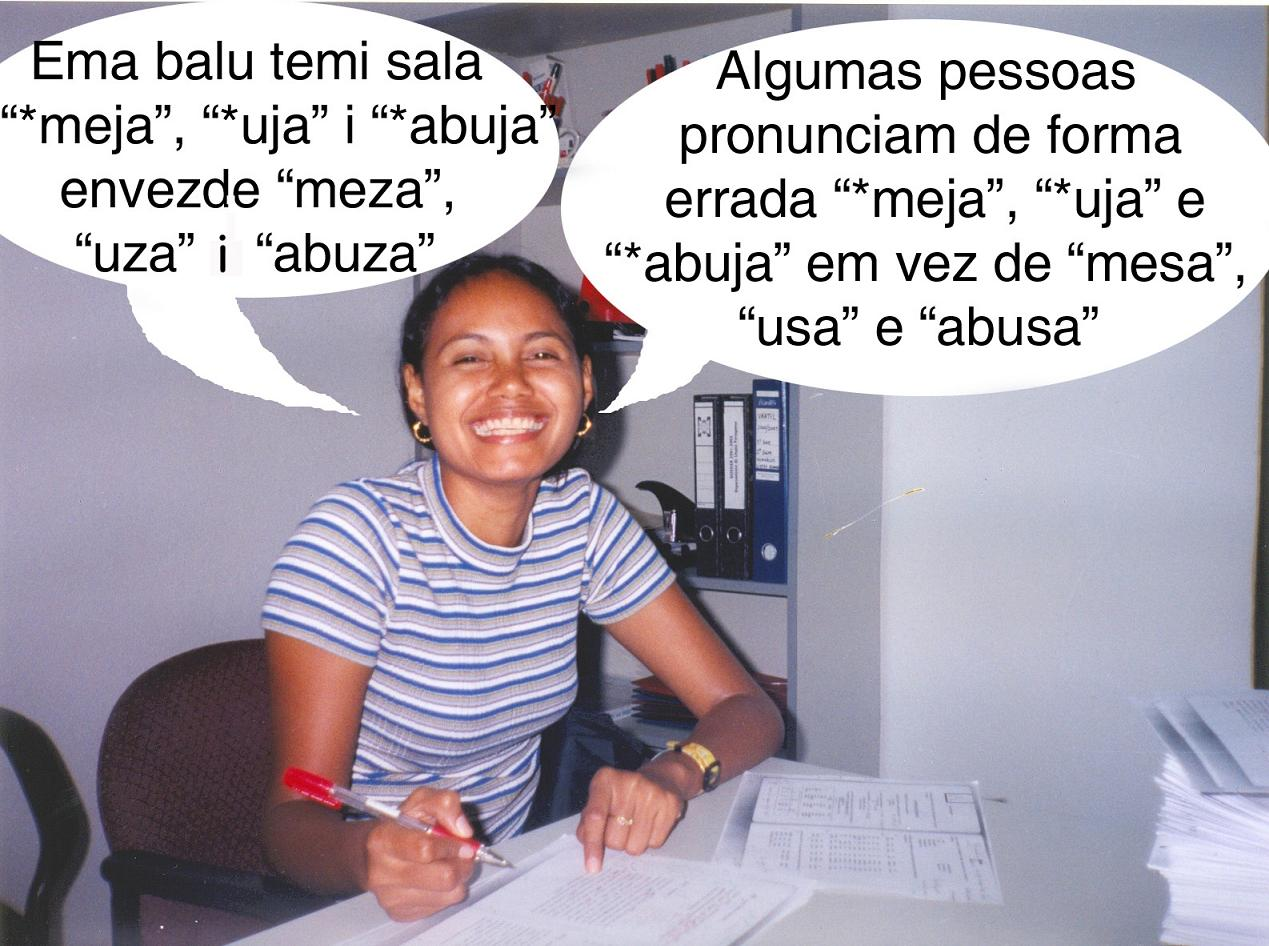
Tetun (left) and Portuguese (right). From a Portuguese course for Tetun speakers. The text says: "Some people incorrectly pronounce '*meja', '*uja' and '*abuja' instead of 'mesa', 'usa' and 'abusa'."

As a result of Bazaar Malay being a regional lingua franca and of Indonesian being a working language, many words are derived from Malay, including:

- atus 'hundred', from ratus
- barak 'much', from banyak
- bele 'can', from boleh
- besi 'iron', from besi
- udan 'rain', from hujan
- dalan 'way' or 'road', from jalan
- fatu(k) 'stone', from batu
- fulan 'moon' or 'month' from bulan
- malae 'foreigner', from melayu 'Malay'
- manas 'hot', from panas
- rihun 'thousand', from ribu
- sala 'wrong', from salah
- tulun 'help', from tolong
- dapur 'kitchen', from dapur
- uma 'house', from rumah

In addition, as a legacy of Indonesian rule, other words of Malay origin have entered Tetun, through Indonesian.

=== Numerals ===
- ida 'one'
- rua 'two'
- tolu 'three'
- haat 'four'
- lima 'five'
- neen 'six'
- hitu 'seven'
- ualu 'eight'
- sia 'nine'
- sanulu 'ten'
- ruanulu 'twenty'

However, Tetun speakers often use Malay/Indonesian or Portuguese numbers instead, such as delapan or oito 'eight' instead of ualu, especially for numbers over one thousand.

=== Combinations ===
Tetun has many hybrid words, which are combinations of indigenous and Portuguese words. These often include an indigenous Tetun verb, with a Portuguese suffix -dór (similar to '-er'). For example:

- han ('to eat') handór – glutton
- hemu ('to drink') hemudór – heavy drinker
- hateten ('to say') hatetendór – chatterbox, talkative person
- sisi ('to nag, pester') sisidór – nag, pest

== Basic phrases ==
- Bondia – 'Good morning' (from Portuguese Bom dia).
- Di'ak ka lae? – 'How are you?' (literally 'Are you well or not?')
- Ha'u di'ak – 'I'm fine.'
- Obrigadu/Obrigada – 'Thank you', said by a male/female (from Portuguese Obrigado/Obrigada).
- Ita bele ko'alia Tetun? – 'Do you speak Tetun?'
- Loos – 'Right'
- Lae – 'No.'
- Ha'u' [la] komprende – 'I [do not] understand' (from Portuguese compreender).

== Grammar ==
=== Morphology ===
==== Personal pronouns ====
		Singular	Plural
1st person	exclusive	Ha'u(-nia)	Ami(-nia)
1st person	inclusive	Ha'u(-nia)	Ita(-nia)
2nd person	familiar	O(-nia)	Imi(-nia)
2nd person	polite	Ita(-nia)	Ita boot sira(-nia)
3rd person		Nia (ninia)	Sira(-nia)

Hau rona asu hatenu
1S hear dog barking
"I hear the dog barking"

Nia sosa sigaru
3S buys cigarettes
"He/She buys cigarettes"

Ita rona rádiu?
1PL hearing radio
"Are we hearing a radio?"

Sira moris hotu ka?
3PL alive all ?
"Are they all alive?"

A common occurrence is to use titles such as Senhora for a woman or names rather than pronouns when addressing people.

Senhora mai hori bain-hira?
Mrs come PAST when
"When did you arrive?"

The second person singular pronoun Ó is used generally with children, friends or family, while with strangers or people of higher social status, Ita or Ita boot is used.

Nina, Ó iha nebee?
Nina 2S.FAM LOC where
"Nina, where are you?"

==== Nouns and pronouns ====
===== Plural =====
The plural is not normally marked on nouns, but the word sira 'they' can express it when necessary.

feto 'woman/women' → feto sira 'women'

However, the plural ending -s of nouns of Portuguese origin is sometimes retained.

Estadus Unidus – United States (from Estados Unidos)
Nasoens Unidas – United Nations (from Nações Unidas)

===== Definiteness =====
Tetun has an optional indefinite article ida ('one'), used after nouns:

labarik ida – a child

There is no definite article, but the demonstratives ida-ne'e ('this one') and ida-ne'ebá ('that one') may be used to express definiteness:

labarik ida-ne'e – this child, the child
labarik ida-ne'ebá – that child, the child

In the plural, sira-ne'e ('these') or sira-ne'ebá ('those') are used:

labarik sira-ne'e – these children, the children
labarik sira-ne'ebá – those children, the children

===== Possessive/genitive =====
The particle nia forms the alienable possessive, and can be used in a similar way to 's in English, e.g.:

João nia uma – 'João's house'
Cristina nia livru – 'Cristina's book'

When the possessor is postposed, representing inalienable possession, nia becomes nian:

povu Timór Lorosa'e nian – the people of Timor-Leste

===== Inclusive and exclusive we =====
Like other Austronesian languages, Tetun has two forms of we, ami (equivalent to Malay kami) which is exclusive, e.g. "I and they", and ita (equivalent to Malay kita), which is inclusive, e.g. "you, I, and they".

ami-nia karreta – 'our [family's] car'
ita-nia rain – 'our country'

===== Nominalization =====
Nouns derived from verbs or adjectives are usually formed with affixes, for example the suffix -na'in, similar to "-er" in English.

hakerek 'write' → hakerek-na'in 'writer'

The suffix -na'in can also be used with nouns, in the sense of 'owner'.

uma 'house' → uma-na'in 'householder'

In more traditional forms of Tetun, the circumfix ma(k)- -k is used instead of -na'in. For example, the nouns 'sinner' or 'wrongdoer' can be derived from the word sala as either maksalak, or sala-na'in. Only the prefix ma(k)- is used when the root word ends with a consonant; for example, the noun 'cook' or 'chef' can be derived from the word te'in as makte'in as well as te'in-na'in.

The suffix -teen (from the word for 'dirt' or 'excrement') can be used with adjectives to form derogatory terms:

bosok 'false' → bosok-teen 'liar'

==== Adjectives ====
===== Derivation from nouns =====
To turn a noun into a nominalised adjective, the word oan ('person, child, associated object') is added to it.

malae 'foreigner' → malae-oan 'foreign'

Thus, 'Timorese person' is Timor-oan, as opposed to the country of Timor, rai-Timor.

To form adjectives and actor nouns from verbs, the suffix -dór (derived from Portuguese) can be added:

hateten 'tell' → hatetendór 'talkative'

===== Gender =====
Tetun does not have separate masculine and feminine gender, hence nia (similar to ia/dia/nya in Malay) can mean either 'he', 'she' or 'it'.

Different forms for the genders only occur in Portuguese-derived adjectives, hence obrigadu ('thank you') is used by men, and obrigada by women. The masculine and feminine forms of other adjectives derived from Portuguese are sometimes used with Portuguese loanwords, particularly by Portuguese-educated speakers of Tetun.

governu demokrátiku – 'democratic government' (from governo democrático, masculine)
nasaun demokrátika – 'democratic nation' (from nação democrática, feminine)

In some instances, the different gender forms have distinct translations into English:

bonitu – 'handsome'
bonita – 'pretty'

In indigenous Tetun words, the suffixes -mane ('male') and -feto ('female') are sometimes used to differentiate between the genders:

oan-mane 'son' → oan-feto 'daughter'

===== Comparatives and superlatives =====
Superlatives can be formed from adjectives by reduplication:

barak 'much, many' → babarak 'very much, many'
boot 'big, great' → boboot 'huge, enormous'
di'ak 'good' → didi'ak 'very good'
ikus 'last' → ikuikus 'the very last, final'
moos 'clean, clear' → momoos 'spotless, immaculate'

When making comparisons, the word liu ('more') is used after the adjective, optionally followed by duké ('than' from Portuguese do que):

Maria tuan liu (duké) Ana — Maria is older than Ana.

To describe something as the most or least, the word hotu ('all') is added:

Maria tuan liu hotu — Maria is the oldest.

==== Adverbs ====
Adverbs can be formed from adjectives or nouns by reduplication:

di'ak 'good' → didi'ak 'well'
foun 'new, recent' → foufoun 'newly, recently'
kalan 'night' → kalakalan 'nightly'
lais 'quick' → lailais 'quickly'
loron 'day' → loroloron 'daily'

==== Prepositions and circumpositions ====
The most commonly used prepositions in Tetun are the verbs iha ('have', 'possess', 'specific locative') and baa/ba ('go', 'to', 'for'). Most prepositional concepts of English are expressed by nominal phrases formed by using iha, the object and the position (expressed by a noun), optionally with the possessive nia.

iha uma (nia) laran — ' inside the house'
iha foho (nia) tutun — ' on top of the mountain'
iha meza leten — ' on the table'
iha kadeira okos — ' under the chair'
iha rai li'ur — ' outside the country'
iha ema (nia) leet — ' between the people'

==== Verbs ====
===== Copula and negation =====
There is no verb to be as such, but the word la'ós, which translates as 'not to be', is used for negation:

Timor-oan sira la'ós Indonézia-oan. — 'The Timorese are not Indonesians.'

The word maka, which roughly translates as 'who is' or 'what is', can be used with fronted phrases for focusing/ emphasis:

João maka gosta serveja. — 'It's John who likes beer.'

===== Interrogation =====
The interrogative is formed by using the words ka ('or') or ka lae ('or not').

O bulak ka? — 'Are you crazy?'
O gosta ha'u ka lae? — 'Do you like me?'

===== Derivation from nouns and adjectives =====
Transitive verbs are formed by adding the prefix ha- or hak- to a noun or adjective:

been 'liquid' → habeen 'to liquify, to melt'
bulak 'mad' → habulak 'to drive mad'
klibur 'union' → haklibur 'to unite'
mahon 'shade' → hamahon 'to shade, to cover'
manas 'hot' → hamanas 'to heat up'

Intransitive verbs are formed by adding the prefix na- or nak- to a noun or adjective:

nabeen — '(to be) liquified, melted'
nabulak — '(to be) driven mad'
naklibur — '(to be) united'
namahon — '(to be) shaded, covered'
namanas — '(to become) heated up'

===== Conjugations and inflections (in Tetun-Terik) =====
In Tetun-Terik, verbs inflect when they begin with a vowel or consonant h. In this case mutation of the first consonant occurs. For example, the verb haree ('see') in Tetun-Terik would be conjugated as follows:

ha'u karee — 'I see'
ó maree — 'you (sing.) see'
nia naree — 'he/she/it sees'
ami haree — 'we see'
imi haree — 'you (pl.) see'
sira raree — 'they see'

=== Tenses ===
==== Past ====
Whenever possible, the past tense is simply inferred from the context, for example:

Horisehik ha'u han etu – 'Yesterday I ate rice.'

However, it can be expressed by placing the adverb ona ('already') at the end of a sentence.

Ha'u han etu ona – 'I've (already) eaten rice.'

When ona is used with la ('not') this means 'no more' or 'no longer', rather than 'have not':

Ha'u la han etu ona – 'I don't eat rice anymore.'

In order to convey that an action has not occurred, the word seidauk ('not yet') is used:

Ha'u seidauk han etu – 'I haven't eaten rice (yet).'

When relating an action that occurred in the past, the word tiha ('finally' or 'well and truly') is used with the verb.

Ha'u han tiha etu – 'I ate rice.'

==== Future ====
The future tense is formed by placing the word sei ('will') before a verb:

Ha'u sei fó hahán ba sira – 'I will give them food.'

The negative is formed by adding la ('not') between sei and the verb:

Ha'u sei la fó hahán ba sira – 'I will not give them food.'

=== Aspects ===
==== Perfect ====
The perfect aspect can be formed by using tiha ona.

Ha'u han etu tiha ona – 'I have eaten rice / I ate rice.'

When negated, tiha ona indicates that an action ceased to occur:

Ha'u la han etu tiha ona – 'I didn't eat rice anymore.'

In order to convey that a past action had not or never occurred, the word ladauk ('not yet' or 'never') is used:

Ha'u ladauk han etu – 'I didn't eat rice / I hadn't eaten rice.'

==== Progressive ====
The progressive aspect can be obtained by placing the word hela ('stay') after a verb:

Sira serbisu hela. – 'They're (still) working.'

=== Imperative ===
The imperative mood is formed using the word ba ('go') at the end of a sentence, hence:

Lee surat ba! – 'Read the letter!'

The word lai ('just' or 'a bit') may also be used when making a request rather than a command:

Lee surat lai – 'Just read the letter.'

When forbidding an action labele ('must not') or keta ('do not') are used:

Labele fuma iha ne'e! – 'Don't smoke here!'
Keta oho sira! – 'Don't kill them!'

== Orthography and phonology ==
The influence of Portuguese and to a lesser extent Malay/Indonesian on the phonology of Tetun has been extensive.

Tetun Vowels
	Front	Central	Back
Close	i		u
Mid	e		o
Open		ä	

In the Tetun language, /a/, /i/ and /u/ tend to have relatively fixed sounds. However /e/ and /o/ vary according to the environment they are placed in, for instance the sound is slightly higher if the proceeding syllable is /u/ or /i/.

Tetun consonants
	Labial		Alveolar		Palatal		Velar		Glottal
Nasal	m		n		(ɲ ~ i̯n)		(ŋ)		
Stop	(p)	b	t	d			k	(ɡ)	ʔ
Fricative	f	(v)	s	(z)	(ʃ)	(ʒ)			h
Approximant					j		w		
Lateral			l		(ʎ ~ i̯l)				
Flap			ɾ						
Trill			(r)						

All consonants appearing in parentheses are used only in loanwords.

Stops: All stops in Tetun are un-aspirated, meaning an expulsion of breath is absent. In contrast, English stops, namely 'p' 't' and 'k' are generally aspirated.

Fricatives: /v/ is an unstable voiced labio-dental fricative and tends to alternate with or is replaced by /b/; e.g. [aˈvoː] – [aˈboː] meaning 'grandparent.'

As Tetun did not have any official recognition or support under either Portuguese or Indonesian rule, it is only recently that a standardised orthography has been established by the National Institute of Linguistics (INL). The standard orthography devised by the institute was declared official by Government Decree 1/2004 of 14 April 2004. However, there are still widespread variations in spelling, one example being the word bainhira or 'when', which has also been written as bain-hira, wainhira, waihira, uaihira. The use of ⟨w⟩ or ⟨u⟩ is a reflection of the pronunciation in some rural dialects of Tetun-Terik.

The current orthography originates from the spelling reforms undertaken by Fretilin in 1974, when it launched literacy campaigns across East Timor, and also from the system used by the Catholic Church when it adopted Tetun as its liturgical language during the Indonesian occupation. These involved the transcription of many Portuguese words that were formerly written in their original spelling, for example, educação → edukasaun 'education', and colonialismo → kolonializmu 'colonialism'.

Reforms suggested by the International Committee for the Development of East Timorese Languages (IACDETL) in 1996 included the replacement of the digraphs ⟨nh⟩ and ⟨lh⟩ (borrowed from Portuguese, where they stand for the phonemes /ɲ/ and /ʎ/) with ⟨n̄⟩ and ⟨l̄⟩, respectively (as in certain Basque orthographies), to avoid confusion with the consonant clusters /nh/ and /lh/, which also occur in Tetun. Thus, senhor 'sir' became sen̄ór, and trabalhador 'worker' became trabal̄adór. Later, as adopted by IACDETL and approved by the INL in 2002, ⟨n̄⟩ and ⟨l̄⟩ were replaced by ⟨ñ⟩ and ⟨ll⟩ (as in Spanish). Thus, sen̄ór 'sir' became señór, and trabal̄adór 'worker' became traballadór. Some linguists favoured using ⟨ny⟩ (as in Catalan and Filipino) and ⟨ly⟩ for these sounds, but the latter spellings were rejected for being similar to the Indonesian system, and most speakers actually pronounce ñ and ll as [i̯n] and [i̯l], respectively, with a semivowel [i̯] which forms a diphthong with the preceding vowel (but reduced to [n], [l] after /i/), not as the palatal consonants of Portuguese and Spanish. Thus, señór, traballadór are pronounced [sei̯ˈnoɾ], [tɾabai̯laˈdoɾ], and liña, kartilla are pronounced [ˈlina], [kaɾˈtila]. As a result, some writers use ⟨in⟩ and ⟨il⟩ instead, for example Juinu and Juilu for June and July (Junho and Julho in Portuguese).

As well as variations in the transliteration of Portuguese loanwords, there are also variations in the spelling of indigenous words. These include the use of double vowels and the apostrophe for the glottal stop, for example boot → bot 'large' and ki'ik → kiik 'small'.

The sound [z], which is not indigenous to Tetun but appears in many loanwords from Portuguese and Malay, often changed to [s] in old Tetun and to [ʒ] (written ⟨j⟩) in the speech of young speakers: for example, meja 'table' from Portuguese mesa, and kamija 'shirt' from Portuguese camisa. In the sociolect of Tetun that is still used by the generation educated during the Indonesian occupation, [z] and [ʒ] may occur in free variation. For instance, the Portuguese-derived word ezemplu 'example' is pronounced [eˈʒemplu] by some speakers, and conversely Janeiru 'January' is pronounced [zanˈeiru]. The sound [v], also not native to the language, often shifted to [b], as in serbisu 'work' from Portuguese serviço (also note that a modern INL convention promotes the use of serbisu for 'work' and servisu for 'service').

== See also ==
- Languages of Timor-Leste
- The Lord's Prayer in Tetun at Wikisource

== Bibliography ==
- National Institute of Linguistics, National University of East Timor (Archived) includes several bilingual Tetun dictionaries, and articles about Tetun
- Hull, Geoffrey, Standard Tetum-English Dictionary 2nd Ed, Allen & Unwin Publishers ISBN 978-1-86508-599-9
- Official Web Gateway to the Government of Timor-Leste – Religion & Language
- The standard orthography of the Tetum language (PDF)
- Matadalan Ortografiku ba Lia-Tetun - Tetun Spelling Guide
- Damien LEIRIS - Personal approach of the Tetum language (PDF)
- Colonization, Decolonization and Integration: Language Policies in East Timor, Indonesia, by Nancy Melissa Lutz
- Current Language Issues in East Timor (Dr. Geoffrey Hull)
- Van Klinken, Catharina (1999). CRCL (ed.). A grammar of the Fehan dialect of Tetun, an Austronesian language of West Timor (PDF). Canberra: Pacific Linguistics, The Australian National University. doi:10.15144/PL-C155. ISBN 0858835142.
- Hull, Geoffrey (1998). "The Languages of Timor 1772-1997: A Literature Review". Estudos de Linguas e Culturas de Timor Leste (Studies in Languages and Cultures of East Timor). 1: 1–38.
- Ross, Melody A. (2017). Attitudes toward Tetun Dili, A Language of East Timor (PDF) (phd thesis). University of Hawaiʻi at Mānoa. hdl:10125/62504.
