= Ń =

Latin letter N with acute accent

Latin N with acute

Ń (minuscule: ń) is a letter formed by putting an acute accent over the letter N.

It represents /ɲ/ in the Belarusian Łacinka alphabet; the alphabets of Apache, Navajo, Polish, Karakalpak, Kashubian, Silesian, Wymysorys and the Sorbian languages; and the romanization of Khmer and Macedonian. This is the same sound as Spanish and Galician ñ, Czech and Slovak ň, Serbo-Croatian and Albanian nj, Italian and French gn, Hungarian and Catalan ny, Latvian and Livonian ņ, and Portuguese nh.

In Yoruba, it represents a syllabic /n/ with a high tone, and it often connects a pronoun to a verb. For example, when using the pronoun for "I" with the verb for "to eat", the resulting expression is mo ń jeun.

== Usage ==
=== Polish ===
In Polish, it appears directly after ⟨n⟩ in the alphabet, but no Polish word begins with this letter, because it may not appear before a vowel (the letter may appear only before a consonant or in the word-final position). In the former case, a digraph ⟨ni⟩ is used to indicate /ɲ/. If the vowel following is /i/, only one ⟨i⟩ appears.

==== Examples ====
- kwiecień (April)
- słoń (elephant)
- dłoń (hand)
- hańba (disgrace)
- słońce (sun)

=== Cantonese ===
It is used in the Yale romanisation of Cantonese when the nasal syllable /ŋ̍/ has a rising tone, as in ⟨ńg⟩ /ŋ̍˧˥/ and ⟨ńgh⟩ /ŋ̍˩˧/.

=== Lule Sami ===
Traditionally ⟨Ń⟩ has been used in Lule Sami to represent /ŋ/. However, in modern orthography, such as signage in Lule Sami by the Swedish government, ⟨Ŋ⟩ is used instead.

=== Kazakh ===
In Kazakh, it was proposed in 2018 to replace the Cyrillic Ң by this Latin alphabet and represents /ŋ/. The replacement suggestion was modified to Ŋ in 2019; and in 2021, it was suggested to replace it with Ñ.

=== Karakalpak ===
Ń/ń is the 19th letter of Karakalpak alphabet and represents /ŋ/.

=== Macedonian ===
Ń is used in Macedonian for the scientific romanisation of the Cyrillic letter ⟨њ⟩, representing /ɲ/, although the digraph ⟨nj⟩ is much more common. This, alongside ⟨ĺ⟩ and ⟨lj⟩, is one of the only two cases where there are two accepted Latin versions of a Cyrillic letter in the scientific romanisation, as per the orthography.

== Computer use ==
HTML characters and Unicode code point numbers:

- Ń: &#323; or &#x143; – U+0143
- ń: &#324; or &#x144; – U+0144

In Unicode, Ń and ń are located the "Latin Extended-A" block.

== See also ==
- Acute accent
