= P̃ =

Latin letter P with tilde

P with tilde
- P̃ p̃
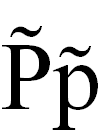

Usage
- Writing system: Latin script
- Type: Alphabet
- Language of origin: Yanesha', languages of Vanuatu
- Sound values: [k͡p], [pʲ]
- In Unicode: U+0050, U+0070, U+0303

P̃ (majuscule: P̃, minuscule: p̃) is a Latin P with a diacritical tilde. It is or was used as a grapheme in some languages of Vanuatu, such as North Efate, South Efate and Namakura, to represent a sound [k͡p], like the ⟨c⟩ in "cat" and ⟨p⟩ in "pay", pronounced simultaneously. It is also used in the Yanesha' language.

The letter was introduced by missionaries and has been in use for over a hundred years.

In Bislama, the lingua franca of Vanuatu, p with tilde is called snekpi "snake-P".

In Old English, it was used as a contraction of the penny, as in ⋅cxx⋅ p̃. ("120 pence").

== Computer encoding ==
Unicode encodes p with tilde with a combining diacritical mark (U+0303 ̃ COMBINING TILDE), rather than a precomposed character. As such, the tilde may not align properly with some fonts and systems. In standard HTML code: majuscule P&#771;, minuscule p&#771;. The Unicode HTML hex code is: minuscule &#x0070;&#x0303;, majuscule &#x0050;&#x0303;. The Unicode HTML decimal code is: minuscule &#112;&#771;, majuscule &#80;&#771;.
