= Nu (Greek) =

Thirteenth letter in the Greek alphabet

Nu (/ˈnjuː/; uppercase Ν, lowercase ν; Greek: νυ ny, [ni]) is the thirteenth letter of the Greek alphabet, representing the voiced alveolar nasal [n]. In the system of Greek numerals it has a value of 50. It is derived from the Phoenician letter nun (𐤍). Its Latin equivalent is N, though the lowercase ($\nu$) resembles the Roman lowercase v.

The name of the letter is νῦ (nû, [nŷː]) in Ancient Greek, while in Modern Greek it is νυ (ny, [ni]).

Letters that arose from nu include N in the Latin script and En (Н) in Cyrillic.

== Symbology ==
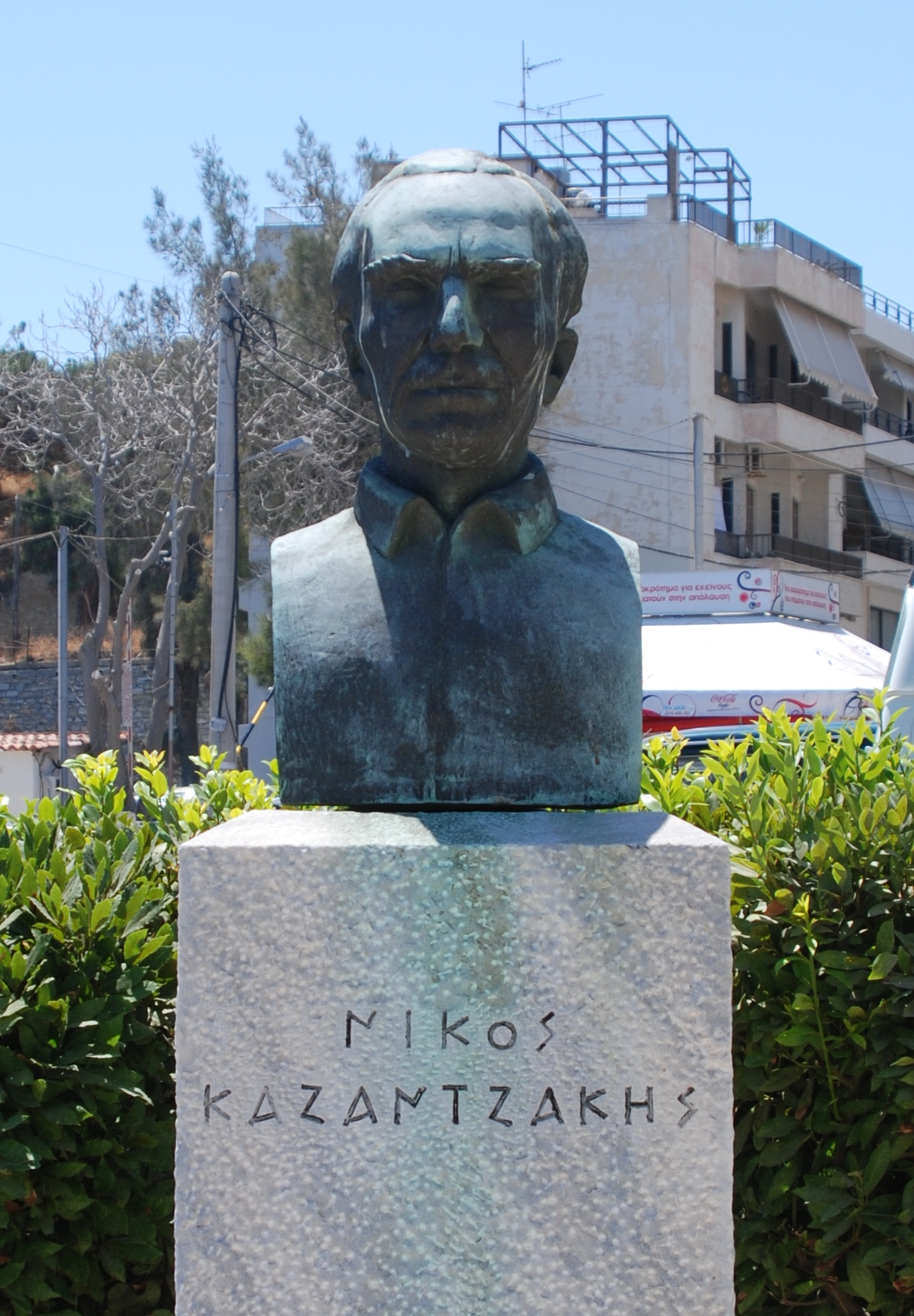
Bust of Nikos Kazantzakis with the traditional Greek nu

The lower-case letter ν is used as a symbol in many academic fields. Uppercase nu is not used, because it appears identical to Latin N.

- Mathematics:
  - Degrees of freedom in statistics.
  - The greatest fixed point of a function, as commonly used in the μ-calculus.
  - Free names of a process, as used in the π-calculus.
  - One of the Greeks in mathematical finance, known as "vega".
  - The reciprocal of 1 plus the interest rate in finance.
  - The p-adic valuation or p-adic order of a number.
- Physics:
  - Kinematic viscosity in fluid mechanics.
  - The frequency of a wave in physics and other fields; sometimes also spatial frequency; wavenumber
  - The specific volume in thermodynamics.
  - Poisson's ratio, the ratio of strains perpendicular with and parallel with an applied force.
  - Any of three kinds of neutrino in particle physics.
  - The number of neutrons released per fission of an atom in nuclear physics.
  - Molecular vibrational mode, ν_{x} where x is the number of the vibration (a label).
  - The true anomaly, an angular parameter that defines the position of a body moving along an orbit (see orbital elements).
- Biology:
  - A DNA polymerase found in higher eukaryotes and implicated in translesion synthesis.
- Chemistry:
  - The stoichiometric coefficient.

== Unicode ==
Encodings of Greek Nu and Coptic Ni.

- U+039D Ν GREEK CAPITAL LETTER NU (&Nu;)
- U+03BD ν GREEK SMALL LETTER NU (&nu;) (\nu in TeX)
- U+2C9A Ⲛ COPTIC CAPITAL LETTER NI
- U+2C9B ⲛ COPTIC SMALL LETTER NI
- U+1D6B4 𝚴 MATHEMATICAL BOLD CAPITAL NU (Note: The mathematical symbols should only be use for math. Stylized Greek text should be encoded using the normal Greek letters, with markup and formatting to indicate text style.)
- U+1D6CE 𝛎 MATHEMATICAL BOLD SMALL NU
- U+1D6EE 𝛮 MATHEMATICAL ITALIC CAPITAL NU
- U+1D708 𝜈 MATHEMATICAL ITALIC SMALL NU
- U+1D728 𝜨 MATHEMATICAL BOLD ITALIC CAPITAL NU
- U+1D742 𝝂 MATHEMATICAL BOLD ITALIC SMALL NU
- U+1D762 𝝢 MATHEMATICAL SANS-SERIF BOLD CAPITAL NU
- U+1D77C 𝝼 MATHEMATICAL SANS-SERIF BOLD SMALL NU
- U+1D79C 𝞜 MATHEMATICAL SANS-SERIF BOLD ITALIC CAPITAL NU
- U+1D7B6 𝞶 MATHEMATICAL SANS-SERIF BOLD ITALIC SMALL NU

== See also ==
- Movable nu
