= DNA polymerase nu =

Protein-coding gene in the species Homo sapiens

POLN

Identifiers
- Aliases: POLN, POL4P, polymerase (DNA) nu, DNA polymerase nu
- External IDs: OMIM: 610887; MGI: 2675617; GeneCards: POLN
Available structures
PDB	Ortholog search: PDBe RCSB
PDB	List of PDB id codes 4XVI, 4XVK, 4XVL, 4XVM
Enzyme activity
EC #	BRENDA	ExPASy	KEGG	MetaCyc
2.7.7.7	↗	↗	↗	↗

Gene location (Human)
Chr.	Chromosome 4 (human)
Band	4p16.3	Start	2,071,918 bp
Band	4p16.3	End	2,242,121 bp

Gene location (Mouse)
Chr.	Chromosome 5 (mouse)
Band	5|5 B2	Start	34,164,523 bp
Band	5|5 B2	End	34,326,792 bp
RNA expression pattern
Bgee	Human / Mouse (ortholog); Top expressed in: caudate nucleus; putamen; nucleus accumbens; right frontal lobe; Brodmann area 9; testicle; anterior cingulate cortex; left testis; right testis; cerebellar hemisphere / Top expressed in: spermatocyte; spermatid; brown adipose tissue; seminiferous tubule; lens; lumbar subsegment of spinal cord; white adipose tissue; primary oocyte; zygote; epithelium of lens; More reference expression data
BioGPS	n/a
Gene ontology
Molecular function	transferase activity; DNA binding; nucleotidyltransferase activity; 5'-3' exonuclease activity; protein binding; cyclin binding; DNA-directed DNA polymerase activity; nucleic acid binding
Cellular component	cytoplasm; nucleolus; nucleoplasm; nucleus
Biological process	cellular response to DNA damage stimulus; DNA replication; double-strand break repair via homologous recombination; DNA repair; DNA-dependent DNA replication; interstrand cross-link repair; translesion synthesis; nucleic acid phosphodiester bond hydrolysis
Sources:Amigo / QuickGO
Orthologs
Databases	NCBI: entry; OMA: entry
Species	Human	Mouse
Entrez	353497	272158
Ensembl	ENSG00000130997	ENSMUSG00000045102
UniProt	Q7Z5Q5	Q7TQ07
RefSeq (mRNA)	NM_181808	NM_001289803; NM_001289804; NM_181857
RefSeq (protein)	NP_861524	NP_001276732; NP_001276733; NP_862905
Location (UCSC)	Chr 4: 2.07 – 2.24 Mb	Chr 5: 34.16 – 34.33 Mb
PubMed search
- Wikidata
View/Edit Human	View/Edit Mouse

Polymerase (DNA directed) nu is a protein in humans that is encoded by the POLN gene. It is a family A DNA polymerase, considered to be the least effective of the polymerase enzymes. However, DNA polymerase nu plays an active role in homology repair during cellular responses to crosslinks, fulfilling its role in a complex with helicase.
