= Quechua alphabet =

Alphabet used to write the Quechuan languages

The Quechua alphabet (Quechua: Achahala) is based on the Latin alphabet. It is used to write the Quechuan languages. The Quechua alphabet has been use in Peru since 1975, following the Officialization of Quechua by Decree Law in May 1975 that made Quechua co-equal with Spanish.

== History ==
As far as is known, there was no writing system in the Andes before the Spaniards' Conquest, so that it seems that Quechua languages were first written in some version of the Latin alphabet. Quechua language colonial orthography was an adaptation and of Golden Age Spanish typographic conventions. For example, the 5 Latin vowel characters, well-suited for Spanish 5-vowel phoneme system, were used for writing Quechua vowel sounds in a phonologically hyperdifferentiating manner. On addition, labial–velar approximant phoneme /w/ was variably transcribed as ⟨gu, hu, u, v⟩. Main points in that evolution were Third Lima Ecclesiastical Council orthography and Diego Gonzalez Holguin orthography. The latter used doubled letters to signal aspirated and ejective segments (such as ⟨pp, tt, cc, qqu⟩ for /pʰ, p', tʰ, t', kʰ, k', qʰ, q'/). As much as normalized pastoral Quechua disappeared, new orthographic conventions were taken from Spanish renewed orthography or invented. Within the former group, ⟨j⟩ was usually used for transcribing velar, post-velar or glottal fricative phonemes [x, χ, h]; within the latter, Ayacucho department local intellectuals normalized the group ⟨cc⟩ to signal /q/ (pronounced [x ~ χ] there). Quechua texts edited by non-Spanish Europeans such as Ernst Middendorf in the late 19th century introduced the use of ⟨k⟩ for uvular consonants /q, qʰ, q'/, which gained some popularity.

It was in the early 20th century that new holistic orthographical proposals appeared, such as Francisco Chukiwanka and Julián Palacios' 1914 alphabet and Julio C. Tello's 1923 orthography. Innovative proposals crystalized in two alphabetic proposals first appeared in Cuzco city: the La Paz alphabet, and the one proposed by poet Andrés Alencastre (also known as Killku Warak'a). The so-called 'La Paz alphabet' was first proposed by editors of Cuzco journal Tradición (Tradition) in 1950, and later ratified in La Paz by the III Congreso Indigenista Inteamericano (Third Inter-American Pro-Indigenous Congress). It remained the most used Quechua orthography until 1975. On the other hand, although unsuccessful, Killku Warak'a's alphabet is almost identical to the current official alphabet, and was the first to apply a phonemic principle to vowels so that he proposed to use just one letter for each vowel phoneme /ɪ, a, ʊ/.

== Current orthography ==
=== For native words ===
The number of letters employed in writing Quechua highly depends on the Quechua dialect. However, the following are the core letters generally used:

Uppercase	A		Ch	H	I		K	L	Ll	M	N	Ñ	P	Q	S	T	U		W	Y
Lowercase	a		ch	h	i		k	l	ll	m	n	ñ	p	q	s	t	u		w	y
IPA	æ	ɑ	tʃ	h	ɪ	ɛ	k	l	ʎ	m	n	ɲ	p	q	s	t	ʊ	ɔ	w	j

In Ecuador and Bolivia, however, ⟨J j⟩ is used instead of ⟨H h⟩ because ⟨h⟩ and ⟨ʼ⟩ are used to express aspirated and ejective sounds:

Uppercase	Chh	Chʼ	Kh	Kʼ	Ph	Pʼ	Qh	Qʼ	Sh	Shʼ	Th	Tʼ
Lowercase	chh	chʼ	kh	kʼ	ph	pʼ	qh	qʼ	sh	shʼ	th	tʼ
IPA	tʃʰ	tʃʼ	kʰ	kʼ	pʰ	pʼ	qʰ	qʼ	ʃ	ʂ	tʰ	tʼ

In writing some dialects, the [ɪ ɛ] and [ʊ ɔ] variations are distinguished by using the letters ⟨e⟩ and ⟨o⟩, respectively, resulting in the use of five vowel letters instead of three. In some dialects, vowel lengths are distinguished by doubling vowel letters to indicate that a vowel is long:

Uppercase	Aa		Ii		Uu		Ee	Oo
Lowercase	aa		ii		uu		ee	oo
IPA	æː	ɑː	ɪː	ɛː	ʊː	ɔː	ɛː	ɔː

In yet other dialects, with additional sounds, additional letters are employed:

Uppercase	Trʼ	Ts	Z
Lowercase	trʼ	ts	z
IPA	ʈʂ	ts	z

=== For loanwords ===
Quechua employs additional letters to write loanwords, mainly originating from Spanish. In careful speech, the letters may represent a Spanish sound, but generally the Spanish sound is replaced with a native sound.

Uppercase	B	D			E			F	Ph	G	I		Kw	O			R	Rr	Tr	U		V	W	X	Y
Lowercase	b	d			e			f	ph	g	i		kw	o			r	rr	tr	u		v	w	x	y
IPA	/b/	/d/	/r/	∅	/e̞/	[ɛ]	[ɪ]	/f/	/f/	/ɡ/	/i/	/ɪ/	/kw/	/o̞/	[ɔ]	[ʊ]	/d/~/ɾ/	/r/	/tɾ/	/u/	/ʊ/	/b/~/w/	/b/	/ks/	/ɡ/

=== For phonetic transcription ===
For phonetic transcription, four additional letters are used:

Uppercase	Č	Ĉ	Š	Ž
Lowercase	č	ĉ	š	ž
IPA	tʃ	ʈʂ	ʃ	ʒ

== See also ==
- Academia Mayor de la Lengua Quechua
