= Voiced palatal nasal =

Consonantal sound represented by ⟨ɲ⟩ in IPA

ɲ
- IPA number: 118

Audio sample
- source · help

Encoding
- Entity (decimal): &#626;
- Unicode (hex): U+0272
- X-SAMPA: J
- Braille: ⠿ (braille pattern dots-123456)
Image

Voiced alveolo-palatal nasal

n̠ʲ

ɲ᫈

A voiced palatal nasal is a type of consonant used in some spoken languages. The symbol in the International Phonetic Alphabet that represents this sound is ⟨ɲ⟩, a lowercase letter n with a leftward-pointing tail protruding from the bottom of the left stem of the letter. The letter ⟨ɲ⟩ is visually similar to ⟨ɳ⟩, the symbol for the retroflex nasal, which has a rightward-pointing hook extending from the bottom of the right stem, and to ⟨ŋ⟩, the symbol for the velar nasal, which has a leftward-pointing hook extending from the bottom of the right stem.

The IPA symbol derives from ⟨n⟩ and ⟨j⟩, ⟨n⟩ for nasality and ⟨j⟩ denoting palatalization. In Spanish and languages whose writing systems are influenced by Spanish orthography, it is represented by the letter ⟨ñ⟩, called eñe ([ˈeɲe]). In French and Italian orthographies the sound is represented by the digraph ⟨gn⟩. Occitan uses the digraph ⟨nh⟩, the source of the same Portuguese digraph called ene-agá (lit. 'en-aitch'), used thereafter by languages whose writing systems are influenced by Portuguese orthography, such as Vietnamese. In Catalan, Hungarian, Aragonese and many African languages, as Swahili or Dinka, the digraph ⟨ny⟩ is used. In Albanian and Serbo-Croatian, the digraph (Nj) is used, and sometimes, for the languages with the Cyrillic script that used to be part of Yugoslavia, uses the (Њњ) Cyrillic ligature that might be part of the official alphabet. In Czech and Slovak, /ɲ/ is represented by letter ⟨ň⟩ whilst Kashubian and Polish use ⟨ń⟩. Latvian and Livonian use ⟨ņ⟩. In Bengali it is represented by the letter ⟨ঞ⟩.

What is transcribed ⟨ɲ⟩ is often actually a voiced alveolo-palatal nasal. There is no dedicated symbol in the International Phonetic Alphabet that represents this sound, which is one reason that ⟨ɲ⟩ is used. If more precision is desired, it may be transcribed ⟨n̠ʲ⟩. There is a non-IPA letter, ⟨ȵ⟩ (i.e. ⟨n⟩, plus the curl found in the symbols for alveolo-palatal sibilant fricatives ⟨ɕ, ʑ⟩), which is used especially in Sinological circles.

An alveolo-palatal nasal is commonly described as palatal; it is often unclear whether a language has a true palatal or not. Many languages claimed to have a palatal nasal, such as Portuguese, actually have an alveolo-palatal nasal. This is likely true of several of the languages listed here. Some dialects of Irish as well as some non-standard dialects of Malayalam are reported to contrast alveolo-palatal and palatal nasals.

Palatal nasals are more common than the palatal stops [c, ɟ].

== Features ==
Sagittal section of a voiced palatal nasal

Features of a voiced palatal nasal:

- Its manner of articulation is occlusive, which means it is produced by obstructing airflow in the vocal tract. Because the consonant is also nasal, the blocked airflow is redirected through the nose.
- Its place of articulation is palatal, which means it is articulated with the middle or back part of the tongue raised to the hard palate.
- Its phonation is voiced, which means the vocal cords vibrate during the articulation.
- It is a nasal consonant, which means air is exclusively allowed to escape through the nose for nasal stops; otherwise, in addition to through the mouth.
- It is a median consonant, which means it is produced by directing the airstream down the midline of the tongue, rather than to the sides.
- Its airstream mechanism is pulmonic, which means it is articulated by pushing air only with the intercostal muscles and abdominal muscles, as in most speech sounds.

== Occurrence ==
=== Palatal or alveolo-palatal ===
Language		Word	IPA	Meaning	Notes
Albanian		një	[ɲə]	'one'	
Amharic		ዘጠኝ / zäṭäňň	[zɛtʼɛɲ]	'nine'	
Aragonese		chunyo	[ˈt͡ʃu.ɲo]	'June'	
Asturian		cabaña	[kaˈβaɲa]	'hut'	See Asturian phonology
Basque		andereño	[än̪d̪e̞ɾe̞ɲo̞]	'female teacher'	
Breton		ignel	[iɲel]	'embers'	
Bulgarian		синьо	[siˈɲo]	'blue'	Only occurs before ь, ю, and я. See Bulgarian phonology
Burmese		ညာ / nya	[ɲà]	'right(-hand side)'	Contrasts with the voiceless palatal nasal /ɲ̥/.
Catalan	Most dialects	any	[ˈaɲ]	'year'	Alveolo-palatal or palatal. See Catalan phonology
Cantonese	Wuzhou dialect	日 / njat6	[ɲ̟ɐt̚˨˩]	'day'	Alveolo-palatal. In standard Cantonese, /j/ is used instead.
Czech		kůň	[kuːɲ]	'horse'	May be intermediate between palatal and alveolo-palatal. See Czech phonology
Dinka		nyɔt	[ɲɔt]	'very'	
Dutch		oranje	[oˈrɑɲə]	'orange'	Not all dialects. See Dutch phonology
English	Malay dialect	canyon	[kɛɲən]	'canyon'	Common in Malay, allophone of /nj/.
French		oignon	[ɔ.ɲɔ̃]	'onion'	See French phonology
Galician		viño	[ˈbiɲʊ]	'wine'	See Galician phonology
Greek		πρωτοχρονιά / prōtochroniá	[pro̞to̞xro̞ˈɲ̟ɐ]	'New Year's Day'	Alveolo-palatal. See Modern Greek phonology
Haketia			[ru.ħa.ˈɲi]	'spiritual'	In free variation with [n] when immediately before [i].
Hindustani	Hindi	पञ्छी / पंछी / pañchī	[pəɲ.t͡ʃʰiː]	'bird'	Usually written in Urdu with [n], and usually with anusvar in Devanagari, written here with the dead consonant to demonstrate proper spelling. See Hindustani phonology
Hindustani	Urdu	پنچھی / pañchī	[pəɲ.t͡ʃʰiː]	'bird'	Usually written in Urdu with [n], and usually with anusvar in Devanagari, written here with the dead consonant to demonstrate proper spelling. See Hindustani phonology
Hmong	White Hmong	𖬖𖬲𖬮𖬵 / nyab	[ɲa˦]	'daughter-in-law'	
Hungarian		anya	[ˈɒɲɒ]	'mother'	Alveolo-palatal with alveolar contact. See Hungarian phonology
Italian	Standard	bagno	[ˈbäɲːo]	'bath'	Postalveolo-prepalatal. See Italian phonology
Italian	Romanesco dialect	niente	[ˈɲːɛn̪t̪e]	'nothing'	Postalveolo-prepalatal. See Italian phonology
Irish		inné	[əˈn̠ʲeː]	'yesterday'	Irish contrasts alveolo-palatal /n̠ʲ/, palatal/palatovelar /ɲ/, velar /ŋ/ and, in some dialects, palatalized alveolar /nʲ/. See Irish phonology
Japanese		庭 / niwa	[ɲ̟iβ̞a̠]	'garden'	Alveolar or dento-alveolar. See Japanese phonology
Khasi		bseiñ	[bsɛɲ]	'snake'	
Khmer		ពេញ / pénh	[pɨɲ]	'full'	See Khmer phonology
Korean		저녁 / jeonyeok	[t͡ɕʌɲ̟ʌk̚]	'evening'	Alveolo-palatal. See Korean phonology
Kurdish	Southern	یانزه / yanze	[jäːɲzˠa]	'eleven'	See Kurdish phonology
Latvian		mākoņains	[maːkuɔɲains]	'cloudy'	See Latvian phonology
Macedonian		чешање / češanje	[ˈt͡ʃɛʃaɲɛ]	'itching'	See Macedonian phonology
Malagasy			—	—	Palatal.
Malay		banyak / باڽـق	[bäɲäʔ]	'a lot'	Does not occur as a syllable-final coda. Allophone of /n/ before /t͡ʃ/ and /d͡ʒ/ so /punt͡ʃak/ 'peak' is read as [puɲt͡ʃäʔ], not *[punt͡ʃäʔ]. See Malay phonology
Malayalam		ഞാൻ / ڿٰانْ / ñān	[ɲäːn]	'I'	See Malayalam phonology
Mandarin	Sichuanese	女人 / ȵü^{3} ren^{2}	[nʲy˨˩˦ zən˧˥]	'women'	Alveolo-palatal
Mapudungun		ñachi	[ɲɜˈt͡ʃɪ]	'spiced blood'	
North Frisian	Mooring	fliinj	[ˈfliːɲ]	'to fly'	
Norwegian	Northern	mann	[mɑɲː]	'man'	See Norwegian phonology
Norwegian	Southern	mann	[mɑɲː]	'man'	See Norwegian phonology
Occitan	Northern	Polonha	[puˈluɲo̞]	'Poland'	Simultaneous alveolo-palatal and dento-alveolar or dento-alveolo-palatal. See Occitan phonology
Occitan	Southern	Polonha	[puˈluɲo̞]	'Poland'	Simultaneous alveolo-palatal and dento-alveolar or dento-alveolo-palatal. See Occitan phonology
Occitan	Gascon	banh	[baɲ]	'bath'	Simultaneous alveolo-palatal and dento-alveolar or dento-alveolo-palatal. See Occitan phonology
Polish		koń	[kɔɲ̟]	'horse'	Alveolo-palatal. May be replaced by a nasal palatal approximant in coda position or before fricatives. See Polish phonology
Portuguese	Many dialects	Sônia	[ˈsõ̞n̠ʲɐ]	'Sonia'	Possible realization of post-stressed /ni/ plus vowel.
Portuguese	Brazilian	sonhar	[sõ̞ˈɲaɾ]	'to dream'	Central palatal, not the same that /ʎ/ which is pre-palatal. May instead be approximant in Brazil and Africa. May be pronounced [soj̃'ŋ̚ja(ɹ)]. See Portuguese phonology
Portuguese	European	arranhar	[ɐʁɐˈɲaɾ]	'to scratch'	
Quechua		ñuqa	[ˈɲɔqɑ]	'I'	
Romanian	Transylvanian dialects	câine	[ˈkɨɲe̞]	'dog'	Alveolo-palatal. corresponds to [n] in standard Romanian. See Romanian phonology
Sanskrit		यज्ञ / yajña	[ˈjɐd͡ʑ.ɲɐ]	'sacrifice'	See Sanskrit phonology
Scottish Gaelic		seinn	[ʃein̪ʲ]	'sing'	Dento-alveolo-palatal. See Scottish Gaelic phonology
Serbo-Croatian		њој / njoj /	[ɲ̟ȏ̞j]	'to her'	Alveolo-palatal. See Serbo-Croatian phonology
Sinhala		ස්පාඤ්ඤය / spāññaya	[spaːɲɲəjə]	'Spain'	
Slovak		pečeň	[ˈpɛ̝t͡ʂɛ̝ɲ̟]	'liver'	Alveolar. See Slovak phonology
Slovene	Some speakers, archaic	konj	[ˈkɔ̂nʲ]	'horse'	See Slovene phonology
Spanish		español	[e̞späˈɲol]	'Spanish'	Simultaneous alveolo-palatal and dento-alveolar or dento-alveolo-palatal. See Spanish phonology
Swahili		nyama / نْيَامَ	[ɲɑmɑ]	'meat'	
Tamil		ஞாயிறு / نَايِرُ / ñāyiru	[ɲaːjiru]	'Sunday'	Alveolo-palatal. See Tamil phonology
Toki Pona	Some speakers	linja	[ˈliɲ.(j)a]	'line'	
Tyap		nyam	[ɲam]	'animal'	
Ukrainian		тінь / tin'	[t̪ʲin̠ʲ]	'shadow'	Alveolo-palatal. See Ukrainian phonology
West Frisian		njonken	[ˈɲoŋkən]	'next to'	Phonemically /nj/. See West Frisian phonology
Vietnamese	Hanoi	nhanh / 𨗜	[ȵajŋ̟˧]	'agile, to run fast, vivacious'	"Laminoalveolar". See Vietnamese phonology
Vietnamese	Ha Tinh	nhanh / 𨗜	[ɲɛɲ˧˥˧]	'agile, to run fast, vivacious'	
Wolof		ñaan / ݧَانْ			
Wu	Shanghainese	女人 / nyú nyǐnh	[n̠ʲy˩˧ n̠ʲɪɲ˥˨]	'women'	Alveolo-palatal.
Wu	Changzhounese	你 / nyi	[ȵi]	'you'	Alveolo-palatal.
Yi		ꑌ / nyi	[n̠ʲi˧]	'sit'	Alveolo-palatal.
Zulu		inyoni	[iɲ̟óːni]	'bird'	Alveolo-palatal.

=== Post-palatal ===
Voiced post-palatal or pre-velar nasal

ɲ᫢

ŋ᫈

There is also a voiced post-palatal or pre-velar nasal in some languages. The International Phonetic Alphabet does not have a separate symbol for this sound, but it can be transcribed as ⟨ɲ̠⟩, ⟨ɲ᫢⟩ (both symbols indicate a retracted ⟨ɲ⟩), ⟨ŋ̟⟩ or ⟨ŋ᫈⟩ (both symbols indicate an advanced ⟨ŋ⟩).

Language		Word	IPA	Meaning	Notes
Catalan	Mallorcan	sang	[ˈs̺aɲc]	'blood'	Coda realization of [ŋ(k)]. See Catalan phonology
German	Standard	gängig	[ˈɡ̟ɛŋ̟ɪç]	'common'	Allophone of /ŋ/ before and after front vowels.. See Standard German phonology
Lithuanian		menkė	[ˈmʲæŋ̟k̟eː]	'cod'	Allophone of /n/ before palatalized velars; typically transcribed in IPA with ⟨ŋʲ⟩. See Lithuanian phonology
Mapudungun		dañe	[ˈθɐɲe̞]	'nest'	
Polish		węgiel	[ˈvɛŋ̟ɡ̟ʲɛl]	'coal'	Allophone of /n/ before /kʲ, ɡʲ/. See Polish phonology
Romanian		anchetă	[äŋ̟ˈk̟e̞t̪ə]	'inquiry'	Allophone of /n/ used before the palatalized allophones of /k, ɡ/. Typically transcribed in IPA with ⟨ŋʲ⟩. See Romanian phonology
Turkish		renk	[ˈɾe̞ɲc]	'color'	Allophone of /n/ before [c] and [ɟ]. See Turkish phonology
Uzbek		ming	[miŋ̟]	'thousand'	Word-final allophone of /ŋ/ after front vowels.
Vietnamese	Hanoi	nhanh / 𨗜	[ɲ̟ajŋ̟˧˧]	'agile, to run fast, vivacious'	Final allophone of /ɲ/. See Vietnamese phonology
Yanyuwa		lhuwanyngu	[l̪uwaŋ̟u]	'strip of turtle fat'	Post-palatal; contrasts with post-velar [ŋ̠].

== See also ==
- Nasal palatal approximant
- Index of phonetics articles
- Ɲ (upper and lower case letter used in some orthographies)

== Notes ==
Place →	Labial					Coronal										Dorsal					Laryngeal			
Manner ↓	Bilabial		Labiodental		Linguolabial		Dental		Alveolar		Postalveolar		Retroflex		(Alveolo-)palatal		Velar		Uvular		Pharyngeal/epiglottal		Glottal	
Nasal	m̥	m	ɱ̊	ɱ		n̼	n̪̊	n̪	n̥	n	n̠̊	n̠	ɳ̊	ɳ	ɲ̊	ɲ	ŋ̊	ŋ	ɴ̥	ɴ				
Plosive	p	b	p̪	b̪	t̼	d̼	t̪	d̪	t	d			ʈ	ɖ	c	ɟ	k	ɡ	q	ɢ	ʡ		ʔ	
Sibilant affricate							t̪s̪	d̪z̪	ts	dz	t̠ʃ	d̠ʒ	tʂ	dʐ	tɕ	dʑ								
Non-sibilant affricate	pɸ	bβ	p̪f	b̪v			t̪θ	d̪ð	tɹ̝̊	dɹ̝	t̠ɹ̠̊˔	d̠ɹ̠˔			cç	ɟʝ	kx	ɡɣ	qχ	ɢʁ	ʡʜ	ʡʢ	ʔh	
Sibilant fricative							s̪	z̪	s	z	ʃ	ʒ	ʂ	ʐ	ɕ	ʑ								
Non-sibilant fricative	ɸ	β	f	v	θ̼	ð̼	θ	ð	θ̠	ð̠	ɹ̠̊˔	ɹ̠˔	ɻ̊˔	ɻ˔	ç	ʝ	x	ɣ	χ	ʁ	ħ	ʕ	h	ɦ
Approximant		β̞		ʋ				ð̞		ɹ		ɹ̠		ɻ		j		ɰ						˷
Tap/flap		ⱱ̟		ⱱ					ɾ̥	ɾ			ɽ̊	ɽ						ɢ̆		ʡ̆		
Trill	ʙ̥	ʙ							r̥	r		r̠	ɽ̊r̥	ɽr					ʀ̥	ʀ	ʜ	ʢ		
Lateral affricate									tɬ	dɮ			tꞎ	d𝼅	c𝼆	ɟʎ̝	k𝼄	ɡʟ̝						
Lateral fricative							ɬ̪		ɬ	ɮ			ꞎ	𝼅	𝼆	ʎ̝	𝼄	ʟ̝						
Lateral approximant								l̪	l̥	l		l̠	ɭ̊	ɭ	ʎ̥	ʎ	ʟ̥	ʟ		ʟ̠				
Lateral tap/flap									ɺ̥	ɺ			𝼈̊	𝼈		ʎ̆		ʟ̆						

		BL	LD	D	A	PA	RF	P	V	U
Implosive	Voiced	ɓ			ɗ		ᶑ	ʄ	ɠ	ʛ
Implosive	Voiceless	ɓ̥			ɗ̥		ᶑ̊	ʄ̊	ɠ̊	ʛ̥
Ejective	Stop	pʼ			tʼ		ʈʼ	cʼ	kʼ	qʼ
Ejective	Affricate		p̪fʼ	tθʼ	tsʼ	tʃʼ	tʂʼ	tɕʼ	kxʼ	qχʼ
Ejective	Fricative	ɸʼ	fʼ	θʼ	sʼ	ʃʼ	ʂʼ	ɕʼ	xʼ	χʼ
Ejective	Lateral affricate				tɬʼ			c𝼆ʼ	k𝼄ʼ	q𝼄ʼ
Ejective	Lateral fricative				ɬʼ					
Click (top: velar; bottom: uvular)	Tenuis	kʘ qʘ		kǀ qǀ	kǃ qǃ		k𝼊 q𝼊	kǂ qǂ		
Click (top: velar; bottom: uvular)	Voiced	ɡʘ ɢʘ		ɡǀ ɢǀ	ɡǃ ɢǃ		ɡ𝼊 ɢ𝼊	ɡǂ ɢǂ		
Click (top: velar; bottom: uvular)	Nasal	ŋʘ ɴʘ		ŋǀ ɴǀ	ŋǃ ɴǃ		ŋ𝼊 ɴ𝼊	ŋǂ ɴǂ	ʞ	
Click (top: velar; bottom: uvular)	Tenuis lateral				kǁ qǁ					
Click (top: velar; bottom: uvular)	Voiced lateral				ɡǁ ɢǁ					
Click (top: velar; bottom: uvular)	Nasal lateral				ŋǁ ɴǁ					
