= N with left hook =

Latin letter N with left hook

Uppercase Ɲ and lowercase ɲ

ᶇ ŋ ɲ ɳ: four "n"-based IPA symbols for nasal sounds.

Ɲ ɲ is a Latin script letter used in the orthographies of some African languages (e.g. Bambara and Fula in Mali). The lowercase form ⟨ɲ⟩ is used in the International Phonetic Alphabet to represent a voiced palatal nasal. It is also sometimes used to represent an alveolo-palatal nasal in the transcription of some languages, as there is no IPA symbol with the latter meaning (though ⟨ȵ⟩ is sometimes used by Sinologists), and no language distinguishes the two.

== Computer encoding ==
Character information
Preview	Ɲ		ɲ	
Unicode name	LATIN CAPITAL LETTER N WITH LEFT HOOK		LATIN SMALL LETTER N WITH LEFT HOOK	
Encodings	decimal	hex	dec	hex
Unicode	413	U+019D	626	U+0272
UTF-8	198 157	C6 9D	201 178	C9 B2
Numeric character reference	&#413;	&#x19D;	&#626;	&#x272;

== See also ==
- Ñ ñ, a Spanish Letter
- Ԩ ԩ, an Orok-Ulita letter
