= Nh (digraph) =

Latin-script digraph

Nh is a digraph of the Latin alphabet, a combination of N and H. Together with lh and the interpunct, it is a typical feature of Occitan, a language illustrated by medieval troubadours. It commonly represents the voiced palatal nasal [ɲ], which is the same sound as the Spanish letter Ñ.

== African languages ==
In some African languages, such as Gogo, nh is a voiceless /n̥/.

In the pre-1985 orthography of Guinea for its languages, nh represented a velar [ŋ], which is currently written ŋ.

== Asian languages ==
In the Gwoyeu Romatzyh romanization of Standard Mandarin, the initial nh- indicates a high tone on a syllable beginning in [n].

Early romanizations of Japanese, influenced by Portuguese orthography, sometimes used nh to represent a prepalatal. Today, this is usually written ny.

=== Vietnamese ===
In Vietnamese, nh represents a palatal [ɲ] word-initially. It was formerly considered a distinct letter, but is no longer. When this digraph occurs word-finally, its phonetic value varies between dialects:

- In the northern dialect, it represents a velar nasal (ŋ), just as ng does; however, its presence may alter the pronunciation of the preceding vowel. For example, banh is pronounced /baɪŋ/, as opposed to /baŋ/ (bang).
- In the southern dialect, it represents an alveolar nasal (n) and shortens the preceding vowel.

The Vietnamese alphabet inherited this digraph from the Portuguese orthography. Previously, Portuguese had borrowed this digraph from Occitan.

== Australian languages ==
In the transcription of Australian Aboriginal languages, nh represents a dental [n̪]. Due to allophony, it may also represent a palatal [ɲ].

== American languages ==
In Purépecha and Pipil, it is a velar nasal, [ŋ].

In the Cuoq Orthography in Algonquin, and in the Fiero Orthography in Ojibwe and Odaawaa, it indicates the vowel preceding it is nasalized. While in the Cuoq orthograph it is ⟨nh⟩ in all positions, in the Fiero orthography it is a final form; its non-final form is written as ⟨ny⟩.

== European languages ==
=== Occitan ===
In Occitan, nh represents a palatal [ɲ].

For n·h, see Interpunct § Occitan.

=== Portuguese ===
In Portuguese, nh represents a palatal [ɲ]. Due to allophony, it may represent the nasal palatal approximant [ȷ̃] in most Brazilian, Santomean and Angolan dialects. It is not considered a distinct letter. Portuguese borrowed this digraph from Occitan.

=== Galician ===
In Galician, there are two diverging norms which give nh differing values.

- According to the Real Academia Galega norm, nh represents a velar [ŋ], while ñ represents a palatal [ɲ].
- According to the reintegrationist norm, mh represents a velar nasal [ŋ], while nh represents a palatal [ɲ]. In this case, nh is shared with Portuguese and comes from Occitan.

Nh is not considered a distinct letter in either norm.

=== Welsh ===
In Welsh, nh is a voiceless alveolar nasal, /n̥/ (a ⟨t⟩ under the nasal mutation).

== See also ==
- Ny (digraph)
- Occitan alphabet
- Portuguese orthography
