= Velar nasal (disambiguation) =

A velar nasal is a speech sound, but the term is ambiguous and can refer to the following:

- Voiceless velar nasal [ŋ̊]
- Voiced velar nasal [ŋ]
