= Ny (digraph) =

Digraph in a number of languages

Latin Ny digraph.

Ny is a digraph in a number of languages such as Catalan, Luganda, Hungarian, Swahili, Malay, and Tagalog. In most of these languages, including all of the ones named above, it denotes the palatal nasal (/ɲ/). To represent the palatal nasal in other languages, the letter nj is used, such as in Albanian and the countries using Gaj's Latin alphabet and the countries that make up the former Yugoslavia.

It has had widespread use for languages of West Africa, though in some countries, the IPA letter ɲ is now used.

It is sometimes used in modern Spanish where ñ cannot be used, such as in earlier computer programming or Internet domain names.

== Aragonese ==
The writing of the palatal nasal in Aragonese has been a matter of debate since the first orthographic codification of the language (grafía de Uesca) in 1987 by the Consello d'a Fabla Aragonesa at a convention in Huesca. Medieval Aragonese had used several different digraphs, but the two most common spellings used were ñ (as in Spanish) or ny (as in Catalan). Ñ was the one chosen and has been used in almost all texts of the last decades, but the subject remained controversial, and some writers continued to promote the use of the digraph ny. The use of ny was also proposed in an alternative Aragonese orthography, the grafía SLA devised in 2004 by the Sociedat de Lingüistica Aragonesa in 2004. According to the 2010 Orthographic Proposal of the Academia de l'Aragonés, created in 2006, the palatal nasal phoneme should be written as ny. The 2023 academic orthography of Aragonese allows both spellings according to personal preference.

== Catalan ==
In Catalan, ny is not considered a single letter but a consonantal digraph (n followed by y) to represent /ɲ/. The letter y, in Catalan, is used only to form ny (except in some foreign words) and has no other purpose.

It is found in any position in a word: at the beginning (nyap "rubbish", nyaufar "to dent"), in intervocalic position (Catalunya "Catalonia"; canya "reed", "steem") and at the end of a word (any "year", estany "lagoon", seny "sense").

== Hungarian ==
Ny is the twenty-third letter of the Hungarian alphabet. Its name is eny (/ɛɲ/), and it represents the palatal nasal (/ɲ/). Even mere sequences of n and y that represent different sounds are considered instances of this letter; this holds true in acronyms as well.

Below are examples of Hungarian words that use the letter ny along with their English translations:

- anya = mother
- enyém = mine
- annyi = so much
- anyós = mother-in-law
- esernyő = umbrella
- zsivány = knave

== Malay ==
In Malaysian and Indonesian, ny represents the palatal nasal /ɲ/; for example, Spain is called Spanyol (compare with España in Spanish).

Until 1972, this digraph was spelled nj in the Indonesian standard.

== Spanish ==
In Old Spanish scripts, the graph ny was widely used, along with nn and ni, to represent the same palatal sound as Catalan, [ɲ]; however since standardization it has been replaced with ñ. Despite this, ny may be found in modern Spanish where ñ is not available, such as in earlier computer programming or Internet domain names.

Similarly, ny is also used in Judaeo-Spanish.

== Swahili ==
In Swahili, ny represents the palatal nasal /ɲ/. As other consonant sounds, it can only appear at the beginning of a syllable. Examples:

- Kenya
- Kinywa = mouth
- Nyoka = snake
- Nyota = star
- Mnyama / wanyama = animal / animals
- Nyama = meat
- Punyeto = masturbation

== See also ==
- Ñ
- Catalan alphabet
- Hungarian alphabet
