= Common Turkic alphabet =

Project for a single Latin alphabet for all Turkic languages

The Common Turkic alphabet (Note: Turkish: Ortak Türk alfabesi Kyrgyz: Жалпы түрк алфавити, romanized: Calpı Türk alfaviti Azerbaijani: Ortaq Türk əlifbası Tatar: Уртак төрки әлифба, romanized: Urtaq Törki älifba Kazakh: Ортақ түркі алфавиті, romanized: Ortaq Türkı alfavitı Uyghur: ئورتاق تۈرك ئېلىپبەسى, romanized: Ortaq Türk Élipbesi Uzbek: Oʻrta Turkiy alifbo) is a project of a single Latin alphabet for all Turkic languages based on a slightly modified Turkish alphabet, with 34 letters recognised by the Organization of Turkic States.

== Alphabet ==
=== Original ===
Its letters are as follows:

Common Turkic alphabet
Upper case	A	Ä	B	C	Ç	D	E	F	G	Ğ	H	I	İ	J	K	L	M	N	Ñ	O	Ö	P	Q	R	S	Ş	T	U	Ü	V	W	X	Y	Z
Lower case	a	ä	b	c	ç	d	e	f	g	ğ	h	ı	i	j	k	l	m	n	ñ	o	ö	p	q	r	s	ş	t	u	ü	v	w	x	y	z
IPA	ɑ	æ	b	dʒ	tʃ	d	e	f	g	ɣ	h	ɯ	i	ʒ	k	l	m	n	ŋ	o	ø	p	q	r	s	ʃ	t	u	y	v	w	x	j	z

Long forms of vowels are shown with a circumflex (in Turkish): Â, Ê, Î, Ô, Û. Note that Î is considered a version of İ, and not of I.

=== 2024 ===
The 2024 modified version, as devised at the Turkic World Common Alphabet Commission in September 2024 optionally replaced ä with ə (already used in the Azerbaijani Latin alphabet) and added Ū to represent the ʊ sound;

Common Turkic alphabet (2024)
Upper case	A	B	C	Ç	D	E	Ə (Ä)	F	G	Ğ	H	X	I	İ	J	K	Q	L	M	N	Ñ	O	Ö	P	R	S	Ş	T	U	Ū	Ü	V	Y	Z
Lower case	a	b	c	ç	d	e	ə (ä)	f	g	ğ	h	x	ı	i	j	k	q	l	m	n	ñ	o	ö	p	r	s	ş	t	u	ū	ü	v	y	z
IPA	ɑ	b	dʒ	tʃ	d	e	æ	f	g	ɣ	h	χ	ɯ	i	ʒ	k	q	l	m	n	ŋ	o	ø	p	r	s	ʃ	t	u	ʊ	y	v	j	z

== History ==
In connection with the collapse of the USSR, in the newly formed republics in which the Turkic languages were the main ones, the ideas of Pan-Turkism became popular again, and, as a consequence, so did the movement for the restoration of the Latin alphabet. In order to unify, and at the initiative of Turkey in November 1991, an international scientific symposium was held in Istanbul on the development of a unified alphabet for the Turkic languages. It was completely based on the Turkish alphabet, but with the addition of some missing letters: ä, ñ, q, w, x. As a result, the alphabet consisted of 34 letters, 29 of which were taken from Turkish.

Azerbaijan was the first to adopt this alphabet in December 1991 and Uzbekistan proposed its adoption in September 1993, while continuing to use Cyrillic. In September 1993, at a regular conference in Ankara, representatives of Azerbaijan, Turkmenistan and Uzbekistan officially announced the transition to the new alphabet.

However, already in 1992, Azerbaijan was reforming its alphabet and replacing the letter ä with ə, taken from old Cyrillic and Yañalif. Starting in 2000, the government decreed that Azerbaijani publications and media should use the Latin script only, officially discontinuing the Cyrillic alphabet in the country.

In May 1995, the government of Uzbekistan decided to adopt a different proposal, based only on the standard 26-letter Latin alphabet. This same proposal was implemented for the Karakalpak language.

Although Turkmenistan committed itself to adopt the original alphabet, it officially adopted a different proposal in 1993 with some unusual characters as letters such as the pound sign (£), the cent sign (¢) and the dollar sign ($). This was later replaced by a different alphabet in 1999, which is only partially similar to the general Turkic one, but differs from it in several letters.

As a result, only Azerbaijani (1991, with one letter changed in 1992), Gagauz (1996), Crimean Tatar (1992, officially since 1997), Tatar in the Tatar Wikipedia (since 2013) and some mass media have used the common Turkic alphabet with minor changes (since 1999).

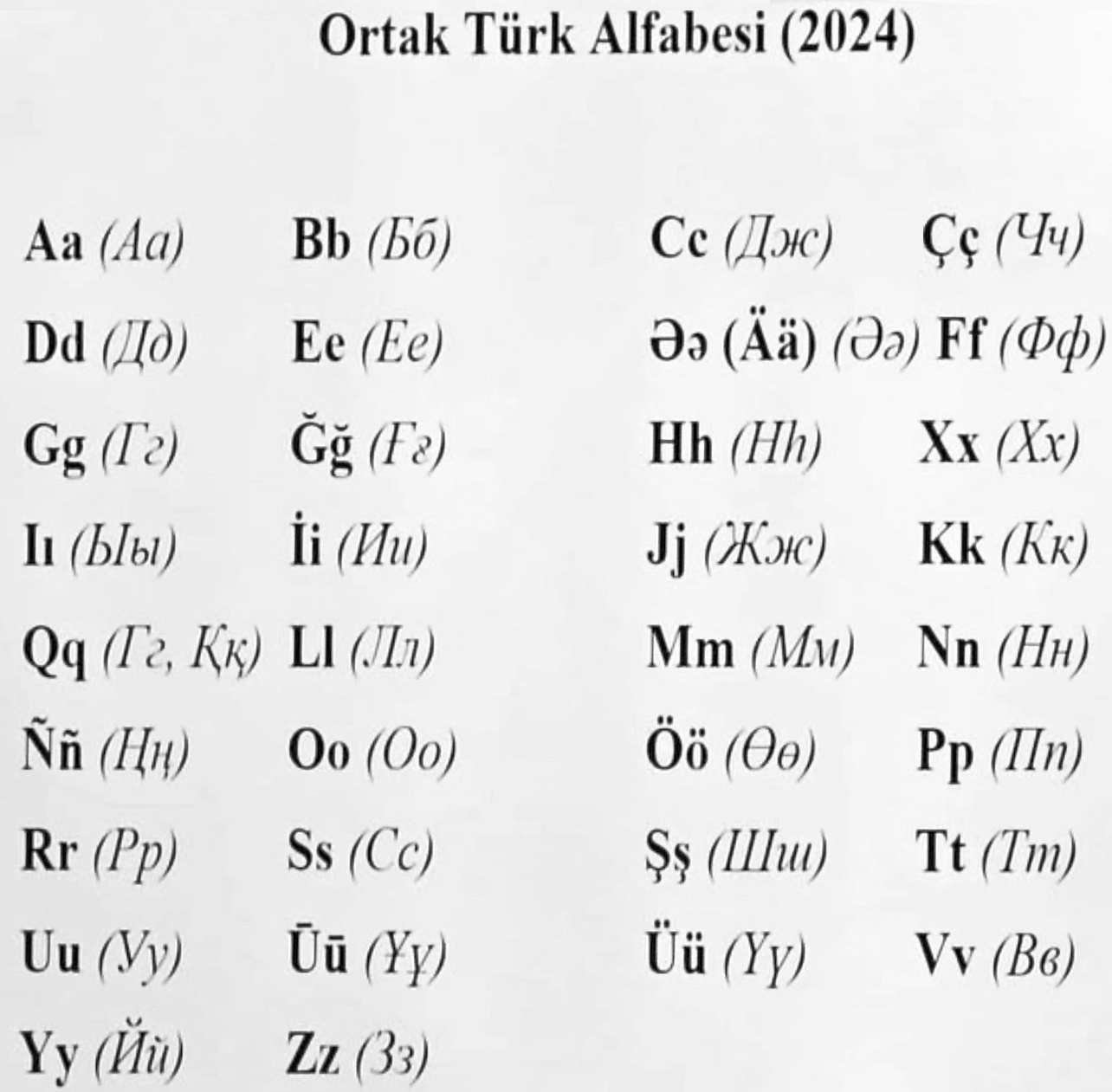
Common Turkic alphabet with 34 letters, as devised at the Turkic World Common Alphabet Commission in September 2024

The Tatar Latin script, introduced in September 1999 and cancelled in January 2005, used a slightly different set of additional letters (ŋ instead of ñ, ə instead of ä), and the letter ɵ instead of Turkish ö. Since December 24, 2012, the common Turkic alphabet has been officially used as a means of transliterating the Tatar Cyrillic alphabet.

In 2019, an updated version of the Uzbek Latin alphabet was revealed by the Uzbek government, with five letters being updated; it was proposed to represent the sounds "ts", "sh", "ch", "oʻ" and "gʻ" by the letters "c", "ş", "ç", "ó" and "ǵ", respectively. This reverses a 1995 reform, and brings the orthography closer to that of Turkish and also of Turkmen, Karakalpak, Kazakh (2018 version) and Azerbaijani.

In April 2021, a revised version of the Kazakh Latin alphabet was presented, introducing the letters Ä ä (Ə ə), Ö ö (Ө ө), Ü ü (Ү ү), Ğ ğ (Ғ ғ), Ū ū (Ұ ұ), Ñ ñ (Ң ң), and Ş ş (Ш ш). The Kazakh government started implementing this version in 2023, and they plan to fully replace the Kazakh Cyrillic alphabet with it by 2031.

The 3rd Meeting of the Turkic World Common Alphabet Commission was held in Baku, Azerbaijan, on September 9–11, 2024, in cooperation with the Turkic Academy and the Turkish Language Association. At the meeting attended by the commission members of the Organization of Turkic States (OST) member countries, a consensus was reached on the Common Turkic Alphabet proposal. The 34-letter Common Turkic Alphabet was designed taking into account the different dialects and language needs of the Turkic world.

== Grapheme-phoneme correspondences ==
The orthographies of Turkic languages are largely phonetic, meaning that the pronunciation of a word can usually be determined from its spelling. This rule excludes recent loanwords such as proper names. The letters representing vowel sounds in Turkic dialects are, in alphabetical order: ⟨a⟩, ⟨ä⟩, ⟨e⟩, ⟨ı⟩, ⟨i⟩, ⟨o⟩, ⟨ö⟩, ⟨u⟩, ⟨ü⟩. (Note: The vowel represented by ⟨ı⟩ is also commonly transcribed as ⟨ɨ⟩ in linguistic literature.)

Primary graphemes of Turkic languages in alphabets based on the modern Common Turkic alphabet (CTA)
Common	A	Ä	B	C	Ç	D	Ḑ	E	F	G	Ğ	Ģ	H	Ħ	I	İ	J	K	L	Ļ	M	N	Ņ	Ñ	O	Ö	P	Q	R	S	Ś	Ş	T	Ţ	U	Ü	V	W	X	Y	Z	Ź
IPA	[ɑ], [a]	[æ]	[b]	[d͡ʒ]	[t͡ʃ]	[d], [dˠ]	[d͡z]	[ɛ]	[f]	[ɡ], [ɟ]	[ɣ], [ʁ]	[ʕ]	[h]	[ħ]	[i]	[ɯ]	[ʒ]	[k], [c]	[l]	[ɫ]	[m]	[n]	[ɲ]	[ŋ], [ɴ]	[o]	[ø]	[p]	[q], [ɢ]	[r]	[s], [sˠ]	[θ]	[ʃ]	[t], [tˠ]	[t͡s]	[u]	[y]	[v]	[w]	[x], [χ]	[j]	[z], [zˠ]	[ð]
Azerbaijani(Latin)	A	Ə	B	C	Ç	D	-	E	F	G	Ğ	-	H	-	I	İ	J	K	L	-	M	N	-	-	O	Ö	P	Q	R	S	-	Ş	T	-	U	Ü	V	-	X	Y	Z	-
Azerbaijani (Arabic)	آ / ‍ـا	اَ / ـَ / ـه‌ / ه	ب	ج	چ	د	-	ائ / ئ	ف	گ	غ	-	ح / ه / هـ	-	ایٛ / یٛ	ای / ی	ژ	ک	ل	-	م	ن	-	-	اوْ / وْ	اؤ / ؤ	پ	ق	ر	ث / س / ص	-	ش	ت / ط	-	اوُ / وُ	اوٚ / وٚ	و	-	خ	ی	ذ / ز / ض / ظ	-
Bashkir	A	Ä	B	C	Ç	D	-	E	F	G	Ğ	-	H	-	I	İ	J	K	L	-	M	N	-	Ñ	O	Ö	P	Q	R	S	Ŧ	Ş	T	TS	U	Ü	V	W	X	Y	Z	Đ
Crimean Tatar	A	-	B	C	Ç	D	-	E	F	G	Ğ	-	H	-	I	İ	J	K	L	-	M	N	-	Ñ	O	Ö	P	Q	R	S	-	Ş	T	-	U	Ü	V	-	-	Y	Z	-
Gagauz	A	Ä	B	C	Ç	D	-	E	F	G	-	-	H	-	I	İ	J	K	L	-	M	N	-	-	O	Ö	P	-	R	S	-	Ş	T	Ţ	U	Ü	V	-	-	Y	Z	-
Karachay-Balkar	A	-	B	C	Ç	D	-	E	F	G	Ğ	-	H	-	I	İ	J	K	L	-	M	N	-	Ñ	O	Ö	P	Q	R	S	-	Ş	T	Ţ	U	Ü	V	W	-	Y	Z	-
Karaim	A	E	B	DŽ	Č	D	DZ	Ė	F	Ď	G	-	H	-	Y	I	Ž	Ť	L	Ľ	M	N	Ń	-	O	Ö	P	K	R	Ś	-	Š	T	C	U	Ü	V	-	CH	J	Ź	-
Karakalpak	A	Á	B	J	CH	D	-	E	F	G	Ǵ	-	H	-	Í	I	J	K	L	-	M	N	-	Ń	O	Ó	P	Q	R	S	-	SH	T	C	U	Ú	V	W	X	Y	Z	-
Kazakh	A	Ä	B	J	Ş	D	-	E	F	G	Ğ	-	H	-	Y	I	J	K	L	-	M	N	-	Ñ	O	Ö	P	Q	R	S	-	Ş	T	TS	Ū	Ü	V	U	H	İ	Z	-
Kumyk	A	Ä	B	C	Ç	D	-	E	F	G	Ğ	-	H	-	I	İ	J	K	L	-	M	N	-	Ñ	O	Ö	P	Q	R	S	-	Ş	T	Č, Ţ	U	Ü	-	W	X	Y	Z	-
Kyrgyz	A	-	B	DJ	Ç	D	-	E	F	G	Ğ	-	H	-	I	İ	J	K	L	-	M	N	-	Ŋ	O	Ö	P	Q	R	S	-	Ş	T	C	U	Ü	V	W	H	Y	Z	-
Nogai	A	Ä	B	C	Ç	D	-	E	F	G	Ğ	-	H	-	I	İ	J	K	L	-	M	N	-	Ñ	O	Ö	P	Q	R	S	-	Ş	T	Ţ	U	Ü	-	W	-	Y	Z	-
Salar (TB30)	A	E	B	C	Ç	D	-	E	F	G	Ğ	-	H	-	I	İ	J	K	L	-	M	N	-	Ñ	O	Ö	P	Q	R	S	-	Ş	T	-	U	Ü	V	V	X	Y	Z	-
Salar (UYY)	A	E	B	J/ZH	Q/CH	D	-	E	F	G	G	-	H	-	I	I	R	K	L	-	M	N	-	NG	O	Ö	P	K	R	S	-	X/SH	T	-	U	Ü	V	W	H	Y	Z	-
Tatar	A	Ä	B	C	Ç	D	-	E	F	G	Ğ	-	H	-	I	İ	J	K	L	-	M	N	-	Ñ	O	Ö	P	Q	R	S	-	Ş	T	-	U	Ü	V	W	X	Y	Z	-
Turkish	A	-	B	C	Ç	D	-	E	F	G	Ğ	-	H	-	I	İ	J	K	L	-	M	N	-	-	O	Ö	P	-	R	S	-	Ş	T	-	U	Ü	V	-	-	Y	Z	-
Turkmen	A	Ä	B	J	Ç	D	-	E	F	G	-	-	H	-	Y	I	Ž	K	L	-	M	N	-	Ň	O	Ö	P	-	R	-	S	Ş	T	-	U	Ü	W	-	-	Ý	-	Z
Uyghur (ULY)	A	E	B	J	CH	D	-	Ë	F	G	GH	-	H	-	-	I	ZH	K	L	-	M	N	-	NG	O	Ö	P	Q	R	S	-	SH	T	-	U	Ü	V	-	X	Y	Z	-
Uzbek	A	-	B	J	CH	D	-	E	F	G	Gʻ	-	H	-	-	I	J	K	L	-	M	N	-	NG	Oʻ	Oʻ	P	Q	R	S	-	SH	T	TS	U	U	V	-	X	Y	Z	-
Uzbek (2021)	A	-	B	J	Ç	D	-	E	F	G	Ğ	-	H	-	-	I	-	K	L	-	M	N	-	Ñ	O	Õ	P	Q	R	S	-	Ş	T	C	U	-	V	-	X	Y	Z	-
Cyrillic script	А	Ә	Б	Җ, Ҹ, Ӌ, Дь	Ч	Д	Ѕ	Э, Е	Ф	Г	Ғ	Ҕ	Һ	Ҳ	И, І	Ы	Ж	К	Л	Љ	М	Н	Њ, Нь	Ң, Ҥ	О	Ө	П	Ҡ, Қ, Ӄ	Р	С	Ҫ	Ш	Т	Ц	У, Ұ	Ү	В	Ў	Х	Й	З	Ҙ
Arabic script	آ، ٵ	ـَ	ب	ج	چ	د، ض	ڏ	اې	ف	گ	غ	ع	ھ	ح	ای	اۍ	ژ	ك	ل	ڵ	م	ن	ڬ	ڭ	ۆ	ۆ	پ	ق	ر	س، ص	ث	ش	ت، ط	ڞ	او	اۊ	ۋ	و	خ	ي	ز، ظ	ذ
Uyghur Arabic alphabet	ا،ئا	ە، ئە	ب	ج	چ	د		ې، ئې	ف	گ	غ		ھ		ى،ئى		ژ	ك	ل		م	ن		ڭ	و، ئو	ۆ، ئۆ	پ	ق	ر	س		ش	ت		ۇ، ئۇ	ۈ، ئۈ	ۋ	ۋ	خ	ي	ز	
1. Ä ä = Ə ə = Э ə 2. Č = J 3. Ś = Þ/θ and Ź = Đ 4. Ţ = T+S and Ḑ = D+Z; 5. Ṡ = ص and Ḋ = ض 6. Ṫ = ط and Ż = ظ 7. Long: Â, Ê, Î, Ô, Û.; 8. Soft: Ă, Ĕ, Ĭ, Ŏ, Ŭ.; 9. Thin: Grave (ˋ) - Consonant letters 10. /ɒ/ is represented by O in Uzbek

- Semi-vowels (Glottal Letters) are shown with a breve (or caron in the Chuvash language): Ă, Ĕ, Ĭ, Ŏ, Ŭ.
- The /θ/ phoneme (Latin Š or Ť, Arabic ث, Cyrillic Ҫ) is only present in the Bashkir language.
- The /ð/ phoneme (Latin Ž or Ď, Arabic ذ, Cyrillic Ҙ) is only present in the Bashkir language.
- Ä is sometimes written as Ə ə or Ǝǝ (Latin glyphs). (Note: Examples: Ämäk/Эmək/Əmək, Ämir/Эmir/Əmir, Äsas/Əsas/Эsas...)
- The phonemes /t͡s/ (Ţ) and d͡z (Ḑ) are represented in the Lipka Tatars Belarusian Arabic alphabet.
- Some handwritten letters have variant forms. For example: Č č = J j, Ķ ķ = Ⱪ ⱪ, and Ḩ ḩ = Ⱨ ⱨ.
- The Cyrillic Ѕ, Љ, and Њ may be written as Ӡ, Ԡ, and Ԣ respectively.
- ٯ = ق (representing /q/) or ڨ (representing /ɢ/).
- Ṡ (ص), Ż (ظ), Ṫ (ط) and Ḋ (ض) are used to represent the front and back variants of the letters S, Z, T and D, respectively. They are commonly found at the beginning of words to indicate that all following vowels will be back vowels. If the sounds S, Z, T, or D occur in the middle of a word with exclusively back vowels, they may appear in their "soft" or neutral forms of S (س), Z (ز), T (ت) or D (د). (The letter Ṫ (ط) can represent the back vowel variants of T and D). Unlike Turkish, Arabic does not have vowel-dependent placement rules for these letters; they appear wherever emphatic consonants occur and can thus be seen in any part of the word. Some examples include Ṡahib, Ṡabun, Huṡuṡ, Ṡabr, etc.

=== Non-Turkic (Cyrillic or Arabic) letters ===
Examples of Latin Turkic alphabets 1922-1940

- Ţ (T-cedilla, minuscule: ţ) is a letter originating as part of the Romanian alphabet, used to represent the Romanian and Moldovan phoneme /t͡s/, the voiceless alveolar affricate (like ts in bolts). It is written as the letter T with a small comma below, and it has both lower-case and upper-case variants. It is also a part of the Gagauz alphabet and the Livonian alphabet. The letter corresponds to Cyrillic Tse (Ц) in the romanisation of Cyrillic Turkic alphabets.
- Ḑ (D-cedilla, minuscule: ḑ) is a letter originating as part of the old Romanian alphabet, used to represent the old Romanian and Moldovan sound /d͡z/, the voiced alveolar affricate. It is written as the letter D with a small comma below, and it has both lower-case and upper-case variants. It is also a part of the Livonian alphabet. The letter corresponds to Cyrillic Dze (Ѕ) in the romanisation of Cyrillic Turkic alphabets.
- Ḋ (ض) is only used for Arabic transcriptions; the emphatic consonant it represents does not exist in Turkic languages. For example: Ramaḋan, Kaḋı, Kaḋa, Ḋarb, Ḋarbe, Arḋ, etc.
- The Latin letter Ë (E-umlaut) has no relation to the Cyrillic letter Ё (Yo). The Latin letter Ë represents the sound sequence /je/ and thus corresponds to the Cyrillic letter Є in Ukrainian or Е in Russian.
- The Cyrillic Ѕ, Љ and Њ all originate in the Serbian and Macedonian alphabets and represent the same phonemes as in the CTA.

== In the USSR ==
The New Turkic alphabet (Jaꞑalif / Yañalif – 'Neo-Alphabet') was a Latin alphabet used by non-Slavic peoples of the USSR from the 1920s to the 1930s. The new alphabet utilised the basic Latin letters excluding ⟨w⟩, as well as some additional letters, with a number of them being based on Cyrillic letter forms. The correspondences between the Soviet Yañalif and modern CTA are given below.

Yañalif	CTA	Cyrillic	Yañalif	CTA	Cyrillic	Yañalif	CTA	Cyrillic
A a	A a	А а	I i	İ i	И и	R r	R r	Р р
B ʙ	B b	Б б	J j	Y y	Й й	S s	S s	С с
C c	Ç ç	Ч ч	K k	K k	К к	Ş ş	Ş ş	Ш ш
Ç ç	C c	Җ җ	L l	L l	Л л	T t	T t	Т т
D d	D d	Д д	M m	M m	М м	U u	U u	У у
E e	E e	Е е	N n	N n	Н н	V v	V v W w	В в Ў ў
Ə ə	Ä ä	Ә ә	Ꞑ ꞑ	Ñ ñ	Ң ң	X x	X x	Х х
F f	F f	Ф ф	O o	O o	О о	Y y	Ü ü	Ү ү
G g	G g	Г г	Ɵ ɵ	Ö ö	Ө ө	Z z	Z z	З з
Ƣ ƣ	Ğ ğ	Ғ ғ	P p	P p	П п	Ƶ ƶ	J j	Ж ж
H h	H h	Һ һ	Q q	Q q	Қ қ	Ь ь	I ı	Ы ы

== Keyboard layout ==
The standard Turkish keyboard layout for personal computers is as follows:

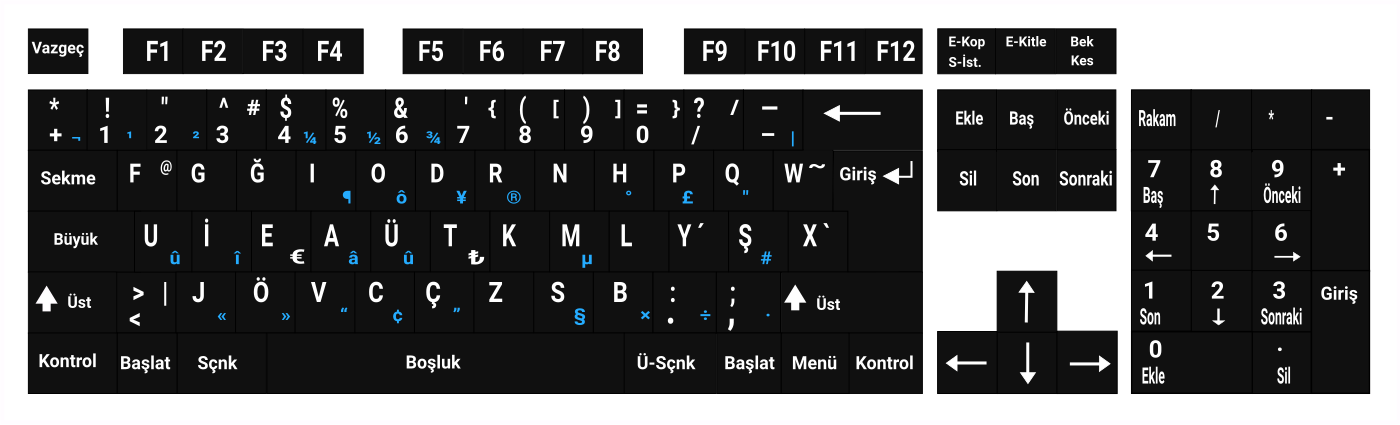

== Bibliography ==
- Wendt, Heinz F. (1987). Sprachen (in German). Frankfurt am Main: Fischer-Taschenbuch-Verl. ISBN 3-596-24561-3.
- Şimşir, Bilâl N. (1992). Türk yazı devrimi (in Turkish). Ankara: TÜrk Tarihi Kurumu Basımevi. ISBN 978-975-16-0420-0.
- Glück, Helmut; Schmöe, Friederike (2005). Metzler Lexikon Sprache (in German). Stuttgart: J.B. Metzler. ISBN 3-476-02056-8.
- Milletlerarası Çağdaş Türk Alfabeleri Sempozyumu Bildirisi, 1991 [Proceedings of the International Symposium of Contemporary Turkish Alphabet]. İstanbul: M.Ü. Türkiyat Araştırmaları Enstitüsü. 1992.
- Akkaya, Çiğdem (1994). Aktuelle Situation in den Turkrepubliken (in German). Köln: Önel-Verl. ISBN 978-3-929490-87-9.
- Kaiser, Markus; Universität Bielefeld Forschungsschwerpunkt Entwicklungssoziologie (2000). Formen der Transvergesellschaftung als gegenläufige Prozesse zur Nationsbildung in Usbekistan (in German). Bielefeld: Universität Bielefeld, Forschungsschwerpunkt Entwicklungssoziologie. OCLC 1063260197.
- Der Fischer Welt Almanach '94 – Zahlen, Daten, Fakten, 1993 (S. 846)
- Mehmet Tütüncü: Alphabets for the Turkic languages
- Herbert W. Duda: Die neue türkische Lateinschrift. I. Historisches. In: Orientalistische Literaturzeitung 1929, Spalten 441–453. – II. Linguistisches. In: Orientalistische Literaturzeitung 1930, Spalten 399–413.
- F.H. Weißbach: Die türkische Lateinschrift. In: Archiv für Schreib- und Buchwesen 1930, S. 125–138.
- Yakovlev, N.F. (1936). О развитии и очередных проблемах латинизации алфавитов [Development and succeeding problems in Latinizing alphabets]. Революция и письменность (in Russian). Vol. 2. pp. 25–38. Archived from the original on April 18, 2005.
- Луначарский. Латинизация русской письменности
- Статья «Новый алфавит» в Литературной энциклопедии
- Nevzat Özkan, Gagavuz Türkçesi Grameri, Türk Dil Kurumu Yayınları, 1996
- Jaŋalif/Яңалиф". Tatar Encyclopedia. (2002). Kazan: Tatarstan Republic Academy of Sciences Institution of the Tatar Encyclopaedia
- Закиев. Тюрко-татарское письмо. История, состояние, перспективы. Москва, "Инсан", 2005
- G.A. Gaydarci, E.K. Koltsa, L.A.Pokrovskaya, B.P.Tukan, Gagauz Türkçesinin Sözlüğü, T.C. Kültür Bakanlığı Yayınları
- Nevzat Özkan, Gagauz Destanları, Türk Dil Kurumu Yayınları
- Prof. Dr. Mustafa Argunşah-Âdem Terzi-Abdullah Durkun, Gagauz Türkçesi Araştırmaları Bilgi Şöleni, Türk Dil Kurumu Yayınları
- Gagauzum Bucaktır Yerim, Tatura Anamut Ocak Yayınları
- Zhou, Minglang (2003). Multilingualism in China: the politics of writing reforms for minority languages, 1949–2002. Contributions to the sociology of language. Vol. 89 (Illustrated ed.). Mouton de Gruyter. p. 174. doi:10.1515/9783110924596. ISBN 978-3-110924-59-6.
