= Romanian Braille =

Braille alphabet of the Romanian language

- Script type: alphabet
- Print basis: Romanian alphabet
- Languages: Romanian

Related scripts
- Parent systems: Braille: Romanian Braille

Romanian Braille is the braille alphabet of the Romanian language. It has the 25 letters of basic French Braille (excluding w, which is very rare in Romanian, appearing only in foreign words) plus the following additional letters:

ă	â	î	ș	ț

Much of the punctuation and formatting (caps, italics) is like old French Braille:

⠲ [period], ⠢ ?, ⠶⠀⠶ (…), ⠦⠀⠴ “…”, ⠔ *,

as seen in the chart at right. In addition, the dash and ellipsis are both

⠤⠄ —, …,

values which were also reported by UNESCO (1990) but could not be confirmed by UNESCO (2013).

UNESCO (1990) reports inner quotation marks ⠠⠀⠠ ‘...’, while the chart at right appears to show a highly unusual double point, ⠄⠄, for the apostrophe. Other sources, however, have the normal single point, ⠄.
