= Jacques-Philippe-Augustin Douchet =

French lawyer, grammarian and encyclopédiste

Jacques-Philippe-Augustin Douchet (? – ?) was an 18th-century French lawyer, grammarian and encyclopédiste.

== Life ==
Douchet worked as a lawyer at the Parlement of Paris. Later he taught Latin at the Parisian École royale militaire.

As an author he wrote about the general principles of the French language and in 1762 laid the rules of French spelling fixed, including his comments on the debate.

In 1765, César Chesneau Dumarsais died, who hitherto contributed on the topic of grammar for the Encyclopédie by Denis Diderot. After his death, Douchet and Nicolas Beauzée - both teachers at the École Royale Militaire - took over his work.

== Works ==
- Principes généraux et raisonnés de l'orthographe françoise, avec des remarques sur la prononciation. chez la Veuve Robinot (1762)

== Bibliography ==
- Nicolas Le Moyne Des Essarts: Les Siècles littéraires de la France. Paris 1800, (p. 632).
