= ISO/IEC 8859-2 =

8-bit character set for Central and Eastern European languages in Latin script

- MIME / IANA: ISO-8859-2
- Alias(es): iso-ir-101, csISOLatin2, latin2, l2, IBM1111
- Language: (see below)
- Standard: ECMA-94:1986, ISO/IEC 8859
- Classification: Extended ASCII, ISO/IEC 8859
- Extends: US-ASCII
- Based on: ISO-8859-1
- Other related encodings: Windows-1250, MacCroatian

ISO/IEC 8859-2:1999, Information technology — 8-bit single-byte coded graphic character sets — Part 2: Latin alphabet No. 2, is part of the ISO/IEC 8859 series of ASCII-based standard character encodings, first edition published in 1987. It is informally referred to as "Latin-2". It is generally intended for Central or "Eastern European" languages that are written in the Latin script. Note that ISO/IEC 8859-2 is very different from code page 852 (MS-DOS Latin 2, PC Latin 2) which is also referred to as "Latin-2" in Czech and Slovak regions. Almost half the use of the encoding is for Polish, and it's the main legacy encoding for Polish, while virtually all use of it has been replaced by UTF-8 (on the web).

ISO-8859-2 is the IANA preferred charset name for this standard when supplemented with the C0 and C1 control codes from ISO/IEC 6429. Less than 0.04% of all web pages use ISO-8859-2 as of October 2022. Microsoft has assigned code page 28592 a.k.a. Windows-28592 to ISO-8859-2 in Windows. IBM assigned code page 912 to ISO 8859-2, until that code page was extended in 1999. Code page 1111 is similar, but replaces byte B0 ° (degree sign) with U+02DA ˚ (ring above).

Windows-1250 is similar to ISO-8859-2 and has all the printable characters it has and more. However a few of them are rearranged (unlike Windows-1252, which keeps all printable characters from ISO-8859-1 in the same place).

== Language coverage ==
These code values can be used for the following languages:

- Albanian
- Early Bosnian (Latin)
- Croatian
- Czech
- Finnish (Note: The missing letter Å is officially a part of the Finnish alphabet, however it has no native use and its usage is limited to foreign names only.)
- German (Note: In 2017, the Council for German Orthography officially added a capital ẞ, but is not actually required as SS can be used instead.)
- Hungarian
- Polish
- Romanian (Note: This character set unifies Ș and Ț (S,T with commas below) with Ş and Ţ (S, T with cedillas), as did virtually all other character sets including Microsoft's Windows-1250 and the first version of Unicode. However, Unicode subsequently disunified them, which complicates processing of Romanian data, as pre-existing data and input methods still contain the older cedilla codepoints.)
- Serbian (Latin)
- Slovak
- Slovene
- Upper Sorbian
- Lower Sorbian
- Turkmen

== Code page layout ==
Differences from ISO-8859-1 have the Unicode code point number underneath.

ISO/IEC 8859-2 (Latin-2)
	0	1	2	3	4	5	6	7	8	9	A	B	C	D	E	F
0x																
1x																
2x	SP	!	"	#	$	%	&	'	(	)	*	+	,	-	.	/
3x	0	1	2	3	4	5	6	7	8	9	:	;	<	=	>	?
4x	@	A	B	C	D	E	F	G	H	I	J	K	L	M	N	O
5x	P	Q	R	S	T	U	V	W	X	Y	Z	[	\	]		_
6x	`	a	b	c	d	e	f	g	h	i	j	k	l	m	n	o
7x	p	q	r	s	t	u	v	w	x	y	z	{	|	}	~	
8x																
9x																
Ax	NBSP	Ą 0104	˘ 02D8	Ł 0141	¤	Ľ 013D	Ś 015A	§	¨	Š 0160	Ş 015E	Ť 0164	Ź 0179	SHY	Ž 017D	Ż 017B
Bx	°	ą 0105	˛ 02DB	ł 0142	´	ľ 013E	ś 015B	ˇ 02C7	¸	š 0161	ş 015F	ť 0165	ź 017A	˝ 02DD	ž 017E	ż 017C
Cx	Ŕ 0154	Á	Â	Ă 0102	Ä	Ĺ 0139	Ć 0106	Ç	Č 010C	É	Ę 0118	Ë	Ě 011A	Í	Î	Ď 010E
Dx	Đ 0110	Ń 0143	Ň 0147	Ó	Ô	Ő 0150	Ö	×	Ř 0158	Ů 016E	Ú	Ű 0170	Ü	Ý	Ţ 0162	ß
Ex	ŕ 0155	á	â	ă 0103	ä	ĺ 013A	ć 0107	ç	č 010D	é	ę 0119	ë	ě 011B	í	î	ď 010F
Fx	đ 0111	ń 0144	ň 0148	ó	ô	ő 0151	ö	÷	ř 0159	ů 016F	ú	ű 0171	ü	ý	ţ 0163	˙ 02D9

== See also ==
- Character encoding
- Polish code pages
