= César Chesneau Dumarsais =

Early eighteenth century French philosopher and grammarian

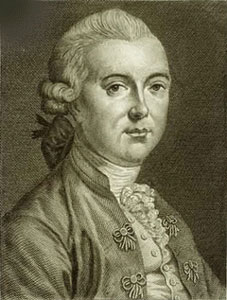
- Born: 17 July 1676; Marseille, Provence, France
- Died: 11 June 1756 (aged 79); Paris, France
- Occupations: Philosopher; Grammarian

César Chesneau, sieur Dumarsais or Du Marsais (July 17, 1676 – June 11, 1756) was a French philosophe, grammarian and contributor to the Encyclopédie ou Dictionnaire raisonné des sciences, des arts et des métiers.

He was a prominent figure in what became known as the Enlightenment, and contributed to Diderot's Encyclopédie. After his death, Jacques-Philippe-Augustin Douchet and Nicolas Beauzée, who were both teachers at the École royale militaire, took over his work.

Born in Marseille, Dumarsais trained in Paris as a lawyer, before abandoning the bar to pursue the life of the mind, subsisting on occasional law students and later on the meager revenue from a pension in the city's Faubourg-Saint Victor. He wrote clandestine tracts in favour of freethought, attacked the French church in books and pamphlets, and proposed, to no avail, a reform of French orthography. He died infirm; in the words of a eulogy penned for the Encyclopédie by D'Alembert, "he lived poor and ignored by the fatherland he had taught".

Principal works include Méthode raisonné pour apprendre la langue latine (1722) and Principes de grammaire (1769). Traité des Tropes (1730) was an influential early attempt to generate a philosophical theory of figurative language. A seven-volume French edition of his complete known works was published in 1797.
