= Ș =

Latin letter S with comma

S-comma

Appearance of comma (upper row) and cedilla (lower row) in the Times New Roman font. Note that the cedilla is placed higher than the comma.

S-comma (majuscule: Ș, minuscule: ș) is a letter which is part of the Romanian alphabet, used to represent the sound /ʃ/, the voiceless postalveolar fricative (like sh in shoe). S-comma consists of an s with a diacritical comma underneath it, and is distinct from S-cedilla.

== History ==
The letter was proposed in the Buda Lexicon, a book published in 1825, which included two texts by Petru Maior, Orthographia romana sive latino-valachica una cum clavi and Dialogu pentru inceputul limbei române, introducing ș for /ʃ/ and ț for /ts/.

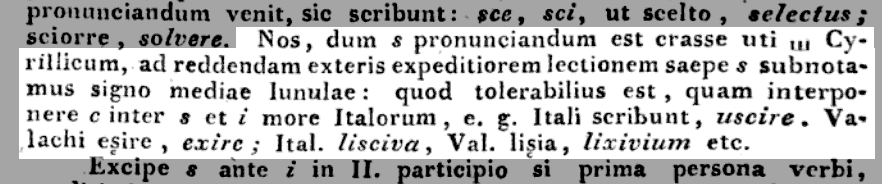
S with "half moon" beneath ("s subnotamus signo mediae lunulae") proposed as a letter in the Buda Lexicon. Note that the form is reversed from the modern version, resembling a small C.

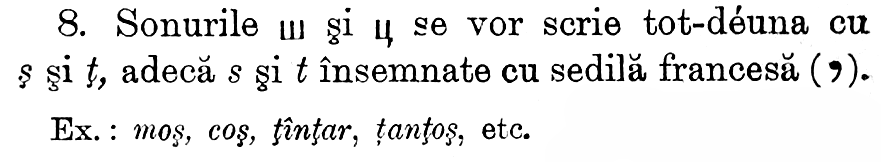
S-cedilla, T-cedilla and a cedilla illustrated with a comma in Ortografia limbei române published by the Romanian Academy in 1895.

== Unicode support ==
S-comma was not initially supported in early Unicode versions, nor in the predecessors like ISO/IEC 8859-2 and Windows-1250. Instead, Ş (S-cedilla), a character available since Unicode 1.1.0 (1993), was used for digital texts written in Romanian. In some contexts, like with low-resolution screens and printouts, the visual distinction between ș and ş is minimal. In 1999, at the request of the Romanian Standardization Association, S-comma was introduced in Unicode 3.0. Nevertheless, encoding for the S-comma was not supported in retail versions of Microsoft Windows XP, but a later European Union Expansion Font Update provided the feature. While digital accessibility to S-comma has since improved, both characters continue to be used interchangeably in various contexts like publishing.

The letter is part of Unicode's Latin Extended-B range, under "Additions for Romanian", titled as "Latin capital letter S with comma below" (U+0218) and "Latin small letter S with comma below" (U+0219). In HTML, these can be encoded by &#x218; and &#x219;, respectively.

== Usage ==
The letter represents the voiceless postalveolar fricative /ʃ/ (as in "show") in the Romanian language. On outdated systems which do not support the glyph, the symbol Ş/ş (S with cedilla) is used. Example word: Timișoara.

== Character encoding ==
Character information
Preview	Ș		ș	
Unicode name	LATIN CAPITAL LETTER S WITH COMMA BELOW		LATIN SMALL LETTER S WITH COMMA BELOW	
Encodings	decimal	hex	dec	hex
Unicode	536	U+0218	537	U+0219
UTF-8	200 152	C8 98	200 153	C8 99
Numeric character reference	&#536;	&#x218;	&#537;	&#x219;

== See also ==
- Ş (S-cedilla)
- Š
- Ț (T-comma)
- D̦ (D-comma)
