= Ş =

Latin letter S with cedilla

- Ş ş

Usage
- Writing system: Latin script
- Type: Alphabetic
- Language of origin: Turkish
- Sound values: [ʃ]
- In Unicode: U+015e, U+015f

History
Development
Aa32M40
        - Σ σ ς
          - ς
            - 𐌔
              - S s
                - Ș ș
                  - Ş ş
- Transliterations: Š Ш Ⱎ ש ش շ

Other
- Writing direction: Left-to-Right

S-cedilla (majuscule: Ş, minuscule: ş) is a letter used in some of the Turkic languages. It occurs in the Azerbaijani, Gagauz, Turkish, and Turkmen alphabets. It will also be used in Uzbek when the law of October 2026 modifying the Uzbek Latin alphabet comes into force in April 2027. It is also planned to be in the Latin-based Kazakh alphabet. It is used in Brahui, Chechen, Crimean Tatar, Kurdish, and Tatar as well, when they are written in the Latin alphabet.

It commonly represents /ʃ/, the voiceless postalveolar fricative (like sh in shoe).

It is written as the letter S with a cedilla below and it has both the lower-case (U+015F) and the upper-case variants (U+15E).

== Romanian ==
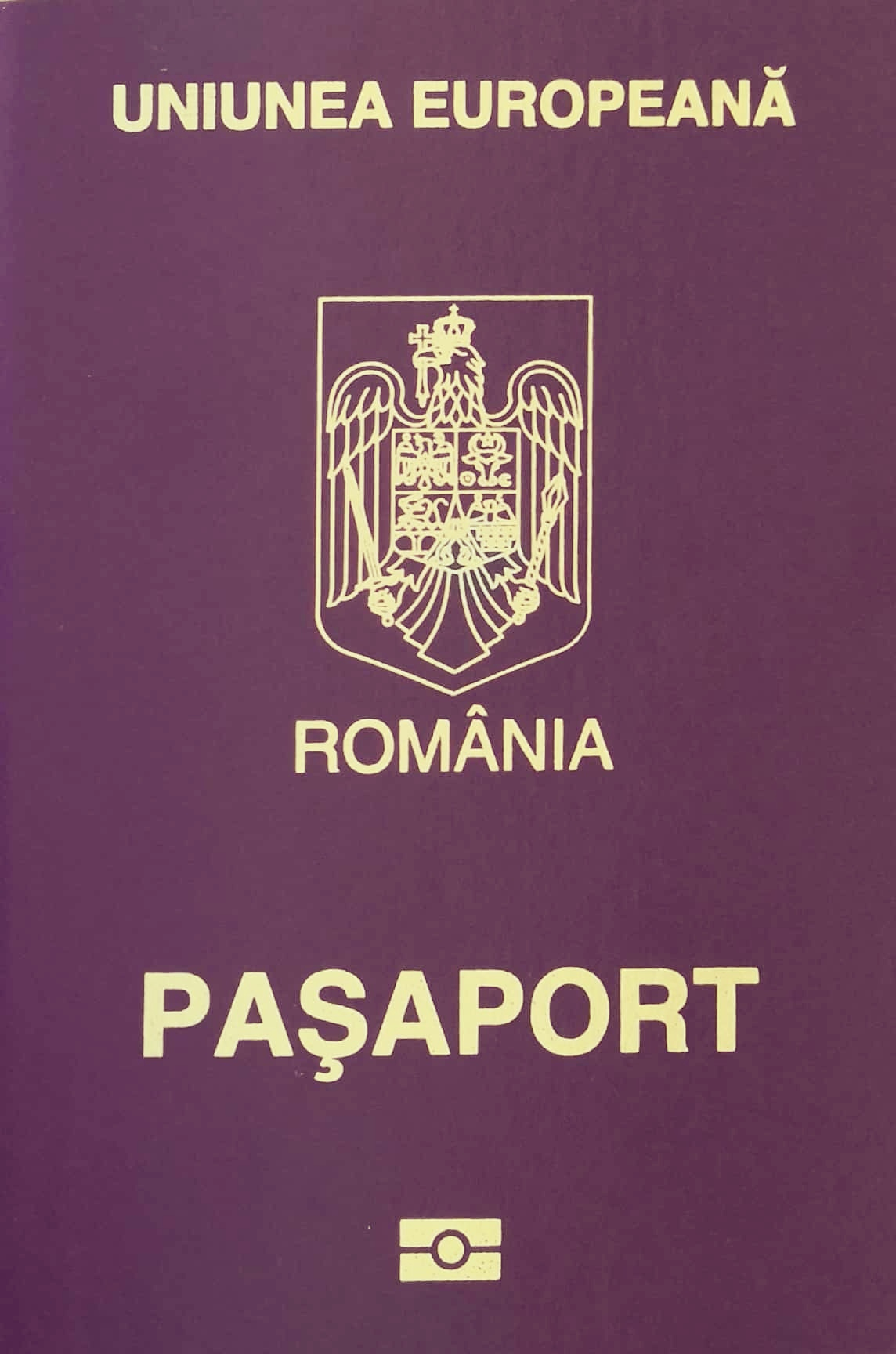
Romanian passport from January 2019 to 2024, showing the substitution of Ş for Ș.

Appearance of comma (upper row) and cedilla (lower row) in the Times New Roman font.

Şşo

S-cedilla

In early versions of Unicode, the Romanian letter Ș (S-comma) was considered a glyph variant of Ş, and therefore was not present in the Unicode Standard. It is also not present in the Windows 1250 (Central Europe) code page. The letter was only added to the standard in Unicode 3.0, and some texts in Romanian still use Ş instead.

== Character encoding ==
Character information
Preview	Ş		ş	
Unicode name	LATIN CAPITAL LETTER S WITH CEDILLA		LATIN SMALL LETTER S WITH CEDILLA	
Encodings	decimal	hex	dec	hex
Unicode	350	U+015E	351	U+015F
UTF-8	197 158	C5 9E	197 159	C5 9F
Numeric character reference	&#350;	&#x15E;	&#351;	&#x15F;
Named character reference	&Scedil;		&scedil;	
ISO 8859-2	170	AA	186	BA
ISO 8859-3	170	AA	186	BA
ISO 8859-9	222	DE	254	FE

HTML entity (HTML 5 only, not supported on all browsers):

Ş	ş
&Scedil;	&scedil;

== See also ==
- Ș (S-comma)
- Ţ (T-cedilla)
- Ç (C-cedilla)
