= Ţ =

Latin letter T with cedilla

Latin T with cedilla

T-cedilla (majuscule: Ţ, minuscule: ţ) is a letter which is part of the Gagauz alphabet, used to represent the sound /t͡s/, the voiceless alveolar affricate (like ts in bolts, or like the letter C in Slavic languages). It is written as the letter T with a cedilla below and it has both the lower-case (U+0163) and the upper-case variants (U+0162). It is also used in the Manjak and Mankanya language for /ʈ/. In Trumai, it represents an alveolar (as opposed to dental) plosive.

== Usage ==
The lower case is used in Semitic transliteration.

- Gagauz alphabet: [t͡s]

This character was used in Kabyle (Berber) for the affricate /t͡s/ (now represented with a tt).

== Romanian ==
Appearance of comma (upper row) and cedilla (lower row) in the Times New Roman font.

In early versions of Unicode, the Romanian letter Ț (T-comma) was considered a glyph variant of Ţ, and therefore was not present in the Unicode Standard. It is also not present in the Windows-1250 (Central Europe) code page. The letter was only added to the standard in Unicode 3.0 (1999), and some texts in Romanian still use Ţ instead.

== Character encoding ==
Character information
Preview	Ţ		ţ	
Unicode name	LATIN CAPITAL LETTER T WITH CEDILLA		LATIN SMALL LETTER T WITH CEDILLA	
Encodings	decimal	hex	dec	hex
Unicode	354	U+0162	355	U+0163
UTF-8	197 162	C5 A2	197 163	C5 A3
Numeric character reference	&#354;	&#x162;	&#355;	&#x163;
Named character reference	&Tcedil;		&tcedil;	
ISO 8859-2	222	DE	254	FE

HTML entity (HTML5 only, not supported by all browsers):

Ţ	ţ
&Tcedil;	&tcedil;

== See also ==
- Ț (T-comma)
- Ş (S-cedilla)
- Ç (C-cedilla)
