= Š =

Latin letter S with caron

Eš
- Š š

Usage
- Writing system: Latin script
- Type: Alphabetic
- Language of origin: Czech language, Silesian language, Slovak language
- Sound values: [ʃ] [ʂ]
- In Unicode: U+0160, U+0161

History
Development
Aa32M40
        - Σ σ ς
          - ς
            - 𐌔
              - S s
                - Ṡ ṡ
                  - Š š
- Transliterations: Ш Ⱎ ש ش շ

Other
- Writing direction: Left-to-Right

Š in upper- and lowercase, sans-serif and serif

The grapheme Š, š (S with caron) is used in various contexts representing the sh sound like in the word show, usually denoting the voiceless postalveolar fricative /ʃ/ or similar voiceless retroflex fricative /ʂ/. In the International Phonetic Alphabet these sounds are denoted with ⟨ʃ⟩ or ⟨ʂ⟩ respectively, but the lowercase ⟨š⟩ is used in the Americanist phonetic notation, as well as in the Uralic Phonetic Alphabet. It represents the same sound as the Turkic letter Ş and the Romanian letter Ș (S-comma), the Hebrew letter שׁ, the Ge'ez (Ethiopic) letter ሠ, the Cyrillic letter Ш, the Arabic letter ش and the Armenian letter Շ (շ).

For use in computer systems, Š and š are at Unicode codepoints U+0160 and U+0161 (Alt 0138 and Alt 0154 for input), respectively. In HTML code, the entities &Scaron; and &scaron; can also be used to represent the characters.

== Primary usage ==
The symbol originates with the 15th-century Czech alphabet that was introduced by the reforms of Jan Hus. From there, it was first adopted into the Croatian alphabet by Ljudevit Gaj in 1830 to represent the same sound, and from there on into other orthographies, such as Latvian, Lithuanian, Slovak, Slovene, Karelian, Sami, Veps and Sorbian.

Some orthographies such as Bulgarian Cyrillic, Macedonian Cyrillic, and Serbian Cyrillic use the "ш" letter, which represents the sound that "š" would represent in Latin-script alphabets. Moreover, Bosnian, Serbian, Croatian, and Montenegrin standard languages adopted Gaj's Croatian alphabet alongside Cyrillic thereby adopting "š", while the same alphabet is used for Romanization of Macedonian. Certain variants of Belarusian Latin and Bulgarian Latin also use the letter.

In Finnish, Estonian, and Kven, š occurs only in loanwords.

Polish and Hungarian do not use š. Polish uses the digraph sz. Hungarian uses the basic Latin letter s and uses the digraph sz as equivalent to most other languages that use s.

Outside of Europe, Syriac Latin adopted the letter but it, alongside other letters with diacritics, is rarely used. The alphabet is not used natively to write the language for which the Syriac alphabet is used instead.

The letter is also used in Lakota, Cheyenne, Myaamia and Cree (in dialects such as Moose Cree), Classical Malay (until end of 19th century) and some African languages such as Northern Sotho and Songhay. It is used in the Persian Latin (Rumi) alphabet, equivalent to ش.

== Transliteration ==
The symbol is also used as the romanization of Cyrillic ш in ISO 9 and scientific transliteration and deployed in the Latin-script writing systems of Macedonian, Bulgarian, Serbian, Belarusian, Ukrainian, and Bashkir. It is also used in some systems of transliterating Georgian to represent ⟨შ⟩ (/ʃ/).

In addition, the grapheme transliterates cuneiform orthography of Sumerian and Akkadian /ʃ/ or /t͡ʃ/, and (based on Akkadian orthography) the Hittite /s/ phoneme, as well as the /ʃ/ phoneme of Semitic languages, transliterating shin (Phoenician and its descendants), the direct predecessor of Cyrillic ш.

== Computing code ==
Character information
Preview	Š		š	
Unicode name	LATIN CAPITAL LETTER S WITH CARON		LATIN SMALL LETTER S WITH CARON	
Encodings	decimal	hex	dec	hex
Unicode	352	U+0160	353	U+0161
UTF-8	197 160	C5 A0	197 161	C5 A1
Numeric character reference	&#352;	&#x160;	&#353;	&#x161;
Named character reference	&Scaron;		&scaron;	

== Gallery ==
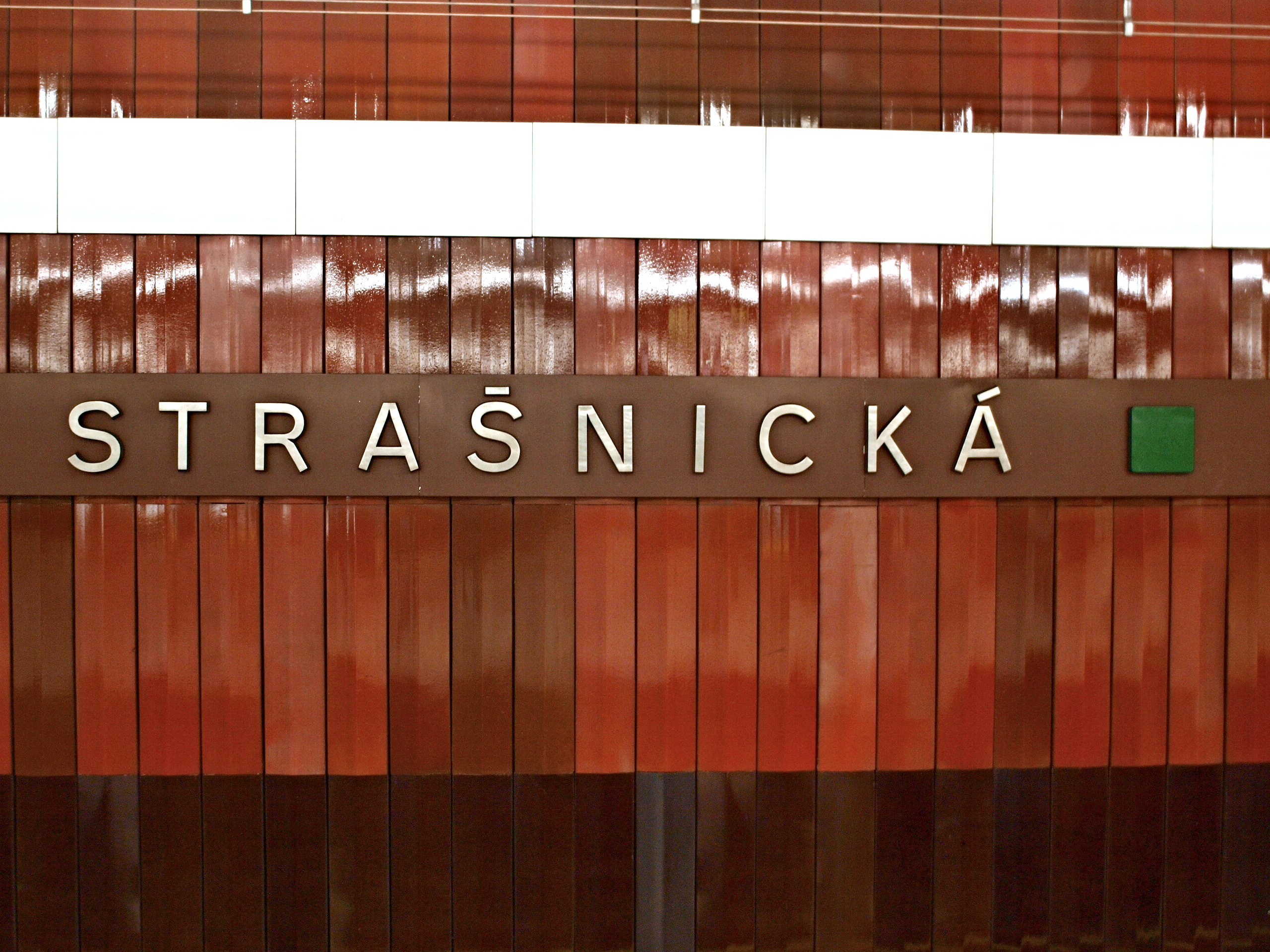
Strašnická Prague Metro station

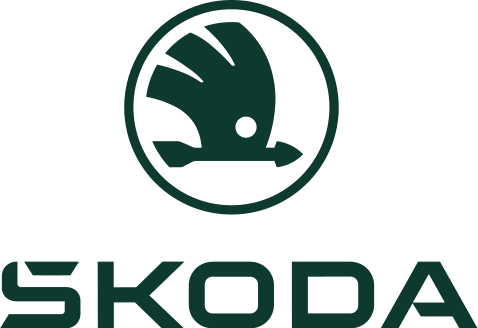
Škoda Auto

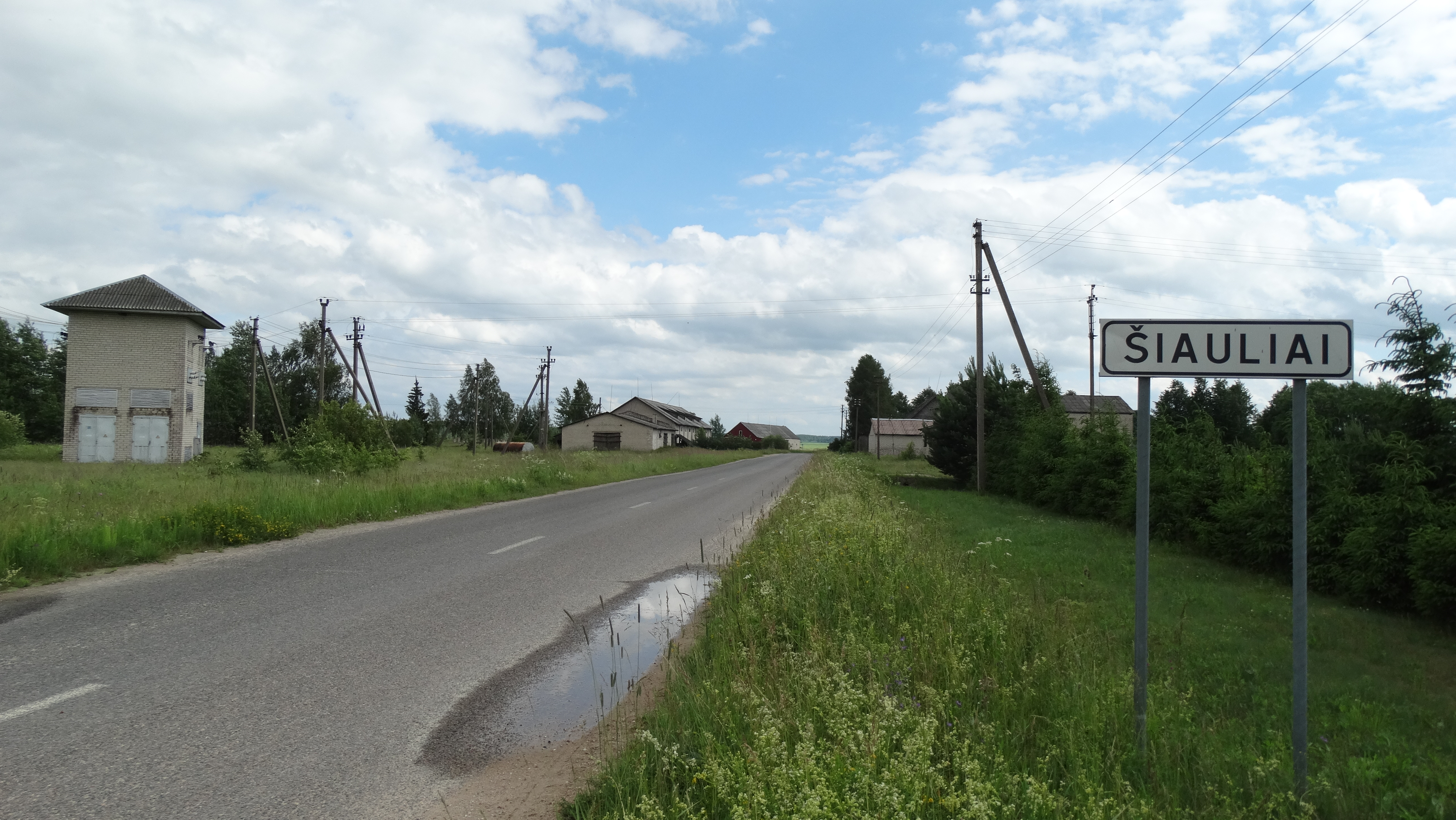
Entrance sign of Šiauliai, Lithuania

Logo of Šiauliai District Municipality, Lithuania

== See also ==
- Ш, ш – Sha (Cyrillic)
- Sz (digraph)
- Ś
- ʃ – Esh (letter)
- Caron
- Shin (letter)
- Voiceless palato-alveolar sibilant
- Ș
- Ş
