= Ż =

Latin letter Z with dot above

Z with overdot
- Ż ż

Usage
- Type: alphabetic
- Language of origin: Kashubian, Maltese, Polish, Silesian
- Sound values: [ʐ], [ʂ], [ʒ], [z], [ð], [dð~dz]
- Alphabetical position: 32

History
- Development: Z z: Ż ż
- Transliterations: Ƶ ƶ

Ż, ż (Z with overdot) is a letter, consisting of the letter Z of the ISO basic Latin alphabet and an overdot.

== Usage ==
=== Polish ===
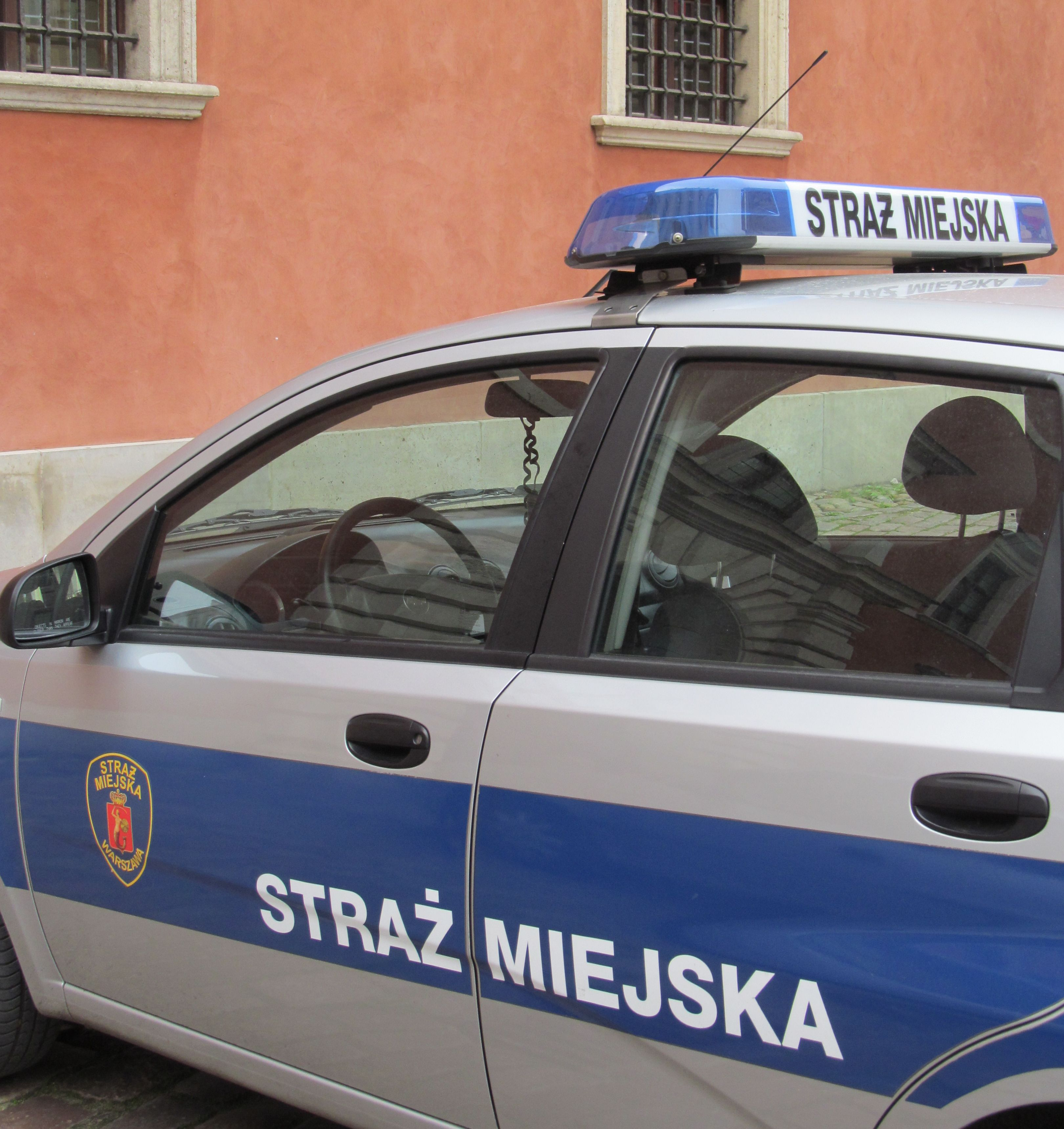
Signage on Polish municipal police (Straż Miejska) cars uses both the standard form (Ż, on the door) and the variant with horizontal stroke (Ƶ, on the roof sign)

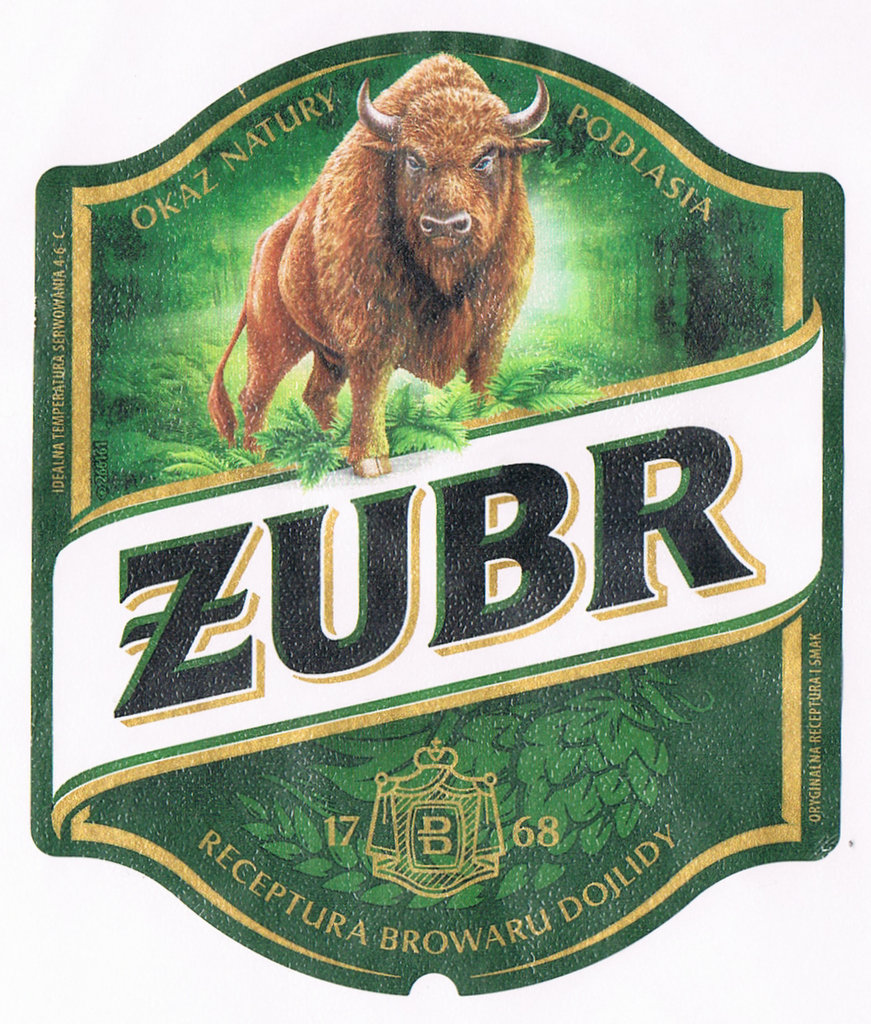
Żubr beer - crossed variant of the letter Ż: Ƶ

In the Polish language, ż is the final, 32nd letter of the alphabet. It typically represents the voiced retroflex fricative ([ʐ]), somewhat similar to the pronunciation of ⟨g⟩ in "mirage"; however, in a word-final position or when followed by a voiceless obstruent, it is devoiced to the voiceless retroflex fricative ([ʂ]).

Its pronunciation is the same as that of the digraph ⟨rz⟩, except that ⟨rz⟩ (unlike ⟨ż⟩) also undergoes devoicing when preceded by a voiceless obstruent. The difference in spelling comes from their historical pronunciations: ż originates from a palatalized /ɡ/ or /z/, while ⟨rz⟩ evolved from a palatalized ⟨r⟩.

The letter was originally introduced in 1513 by Stanisław Zaborowski in his book Ortographia.

Occasionally, the letter Ƶ ƶ (Z with a horizontal stroke) is used instead of Ż ż for aesthetic purposes, especially in all-caps text and handwriting.

=== Kashubian ===
Kashubian ż is a voiced fricative like in Polish, but it is postalveolar ([ʒ]) rather than retroflex.

=== Maltese ===
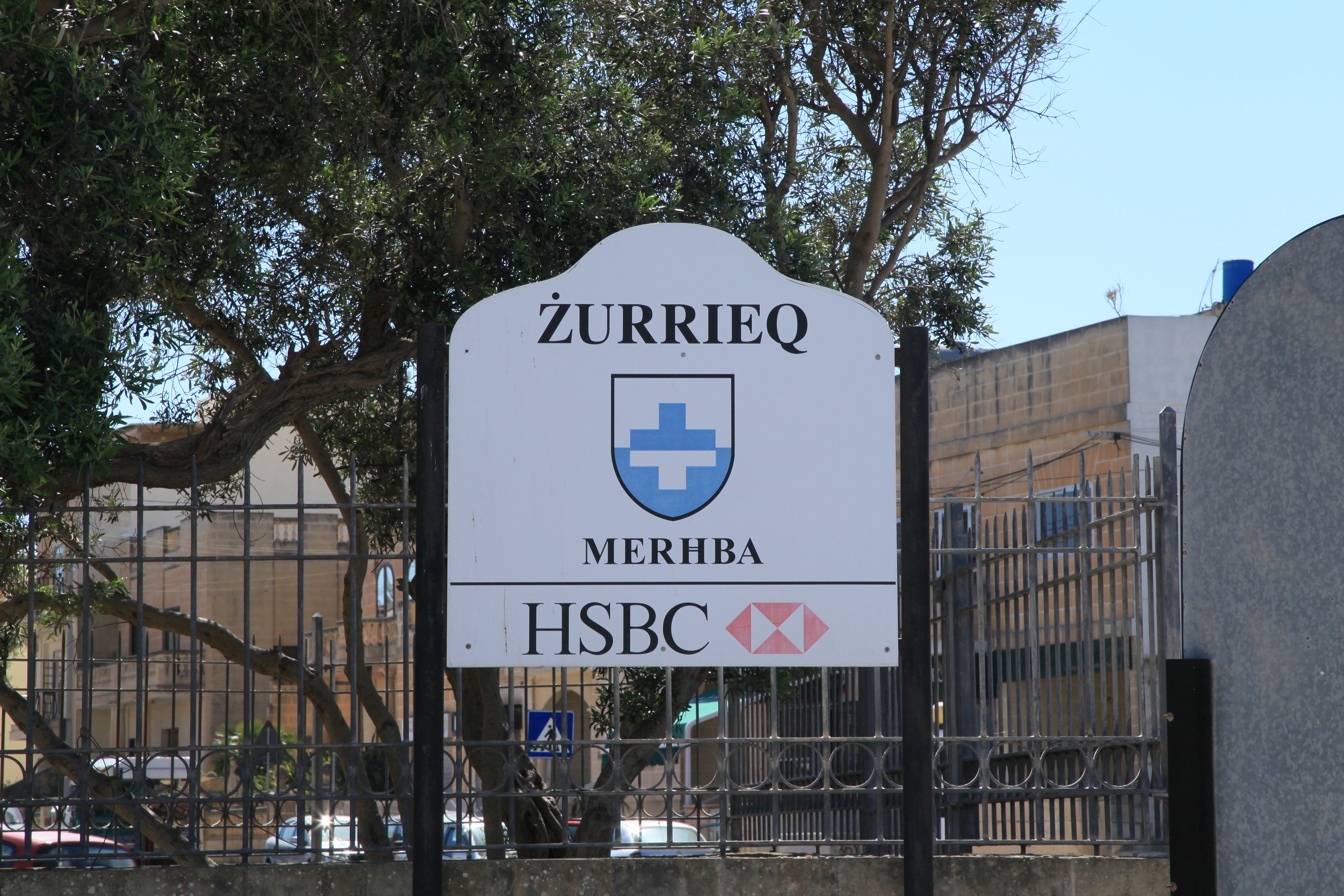
City limit sign of Żurrieq in Malta

In Maltese, ż represents the voiced alveolar sibilant [z], pronounced like "z" in English "maze". This contrasts with the letter ⟨z⟩, which represents the voiceless alveolar sibilant affricate [ts], like in the word "hats". The corresponding letter in Arabic in this Maltese letter is ز.

=== Emilian-Romagnol ===
In Emilian-Romagnol, ż represents the voiced dental fricative [ð], pronounced like "th" in English "this".

== Computing codes ==
Character	Ż		ż	
Unicode name	LATIN CAPITAL LETTER; Z WITH DOT ABOVE	LATIN CAPITAL LETTER; Z WITH DOT ABOVE	LATIN SMALL LETTER; Z WITH DOT ABOVE	LATIN SMALL LETTER; Z WITH DOT ABOVE
character encoding	decimal	hex	decimal	hex
Unicode	379	U+017B	380	U+017C
UTF-8	197 187	C5 BB	197 188	C5 BC
Numeric character reference	&#379;	&#x017B;	&#380;	&#x017C;
CP 852	189	BD	190	BE
CP 775	163	A3	164	A4
Mazovia	161	A1	167	A7
Windows-1250, ISO-8859-2	175	AF	191	BF
Windows-1257, ISO-8859-13	221	DD	253	FD
Mac Central European	251	FB	253	FD

== See also ==
- Ź and Ž
- Polish alphabet
- Polish phonology
- Dot (diacritic)
