= Cedilla =

Diacritic used in Latin alphabets

¸o

Cedilla
- U+0327 (combining diacritic); U+00B8 (spacing modifier letters, ISO/IEC 8859)

A cedilla (/sɪˈdɪlə/ sih-DIL-ə; from Spanish cedilla, "small ceda", i.e. small "z"), or cedille (from French cédille, pronounced [sedij]), is a hook or tail (¸) added under certain letters (as a diacritical mark) to indicate that their pronunciation is modified. In Catalan (where it is called trenc), French, and Portuguese (where it is called a cedilha) it is used only under the letter ⟨c⟩ (to form ⟨ç⟩), and the entire letter is called, respectively, Catalan: c trencada (i.e. "broken C"), French: c cédille, and Portuguese: c cedilha (or c cedilhado). It is used to mark vowel nasalization in many languages of Sub-Saharan Africa, including Vute from Cameroon.

This diacritic is not to be confused with the ogonek (◌̨), which resembles the cedilla but mirrored. It looks also very similar to the diacritical comma, which is used in the Romanian and Latvian alphabet, and which is misnamed "cedilla" in the Unicode standard.

There is substantial overlap between the cedilla and a diacritical comma. The cedilla is traditionally centered on the letter, and when there is no stroke for it to attach to in that position, as in Ņ ņ, the connecting stroke is omitted, taking the form of a comma. However, the cedilla may instead be shifted left or right to attach to a descending leg. In some orthographies the comma form has been generalized even in cases where the cedilla could attach, as in Ḑ ḑ, but is still considered to be a cedilla. This produces a contrast between attached and non-attached (comma) glyphs, which is usually left to the font but in the cases of Ş ş Ţ ţ and Ș ș Ț ț is formalized by Unicode.

== History ==
Evolution from Visigothic ⟨Ꝣ⟩ to modern ⟨Ç⟩

The modern grapheme of the cedilla derives from medieval Gothic script or Visigothic script ⟨ꝣ⟩. The use of this sign arose from the limitations of the Latin alphabet. Its name comes from Spanish and appeared in the 17th century, meaning "little z" (as c replaced z in Spanish before e).

Under the letter c, the handwritten cedilla developed through three successive forms: a diacritic z, then a z with a cedilla (subscript and sometimes superscript), and finally the modern c with cedilla. By contrast, the evolution of the e caudata is considered unrelated to that of the cedilla.

The tail originated in Spain as the bottom half of a miniature cursive z. The word cedilla is the diminutive of the Old Spanish name for this letter, ceda (zeta). Modern Spanish and isolationist Galician no longer use this diacritic, although it is used in Reintegrationist Galician, Portuguese, Catalan, Occitan, and French, which gives English the alternative spellings of cedille, from French "cédille", and the Portuguese form cedilha. An obsolete spelling of cedilla is cerilla. The earliest use in English cited by the Oxford English Dictionary is a 1599 Spanish-English dictionary and grammar. Chambers' Cyclopædia is cited for the printer-trade variant ceceril in use in 1738. Its use in English is not universal and applies to loan words from French and Portuguese such as façade, limaçon and cachaça (often typed facade, limacon and cachaca because of lack of ç keys on English-language keyboards).

With the advent of typeface modernism, the calligraphic nature of the cedilla was thought somewhat jarring on sans-serif typefaces, and so some designers instead substituted a comma design, which could be made bolder and more compatible with the style of the text. (Note: Fonts with this design include Akzidenz-Grotesk and Helvetica, especially the Neue Haas Grotesk digitisation.) This reduces the visual distinction between the cedilla and the diacritical comma.

== In manuscripts ==
=== C with cedilla ===
The palatal phoneme /ts/ of the Romance languages derives from a Latin /k/ c that was palatalized and then assibilated. Before vowels that would otherwise trigger a non-palatalized (and therefore incorrect) pronunciation (/k/ before a, o, and u), scribes used various spellings to indicate the "new" pronunciation: simply c, ce, or cz (with e and z functioning as diacritic letters).

Thus ceo and czo were read /tso/: the diacritic e and z prevented the reading /ko/.

This latter notation appears in French as early as the first literary manuscript in the French language, the Sequence of Saint Eulalia (dated to 881 and consisting of 29 verses), where it occurs only once, in verse 21.

According to Greimas (2001), the neuter demonstrative ço appears in the Sequence of Saint Eulalia.

However, Greimas gives only the form ço for this text, although the manuscript, rediscovered in the 19th century, contains no cedilla in any of its 29 verses. Moreover, the manuscript dates to 881 rather than broadly to the "10th century".

By contrast, Pierre Ivart analyzes the form czo as follows:

On tc and cz. These graphemes therefore represent ts. The case of "czo" (v. 21) is fairly clear: the scribe could not use c alone before o to represent tch, since before o, c always has the value k (except in the Oaths of Strasbourg). He therefore resorts to an experimental grapheme cz. [Translated from French]

The z in czo is thus interpreted as a diacritic z which, once placed beneath the c, would become the cedilla.

The Visigothic script is indeed thought to have abbreviated this grapheme around the 11th century in Spain. Initially, the c was written above the z in its form ʒ; later, the c regained its full size while ʒ was reduced to a subscript sign. Thus, the Spanish word lanʒa /lantsa/ ("lance") came to be written lança. The usefulness of such a sign, and an early attempt to systematize the notation of /ts/, led (depending on scribes) to the extension of the cedilla before the vowels i and e (çinco, "five"). This was later regarded as a form of hypercorrection, since c alone was sufficient (cinq and çinq are pronounced identically).

Maria Selig confirms this Visigothic origin:

The history of the cedilla and its diffusion is well known today, so I shall confine myself to a very brief synthesis. As a result of the application of Visigothic script to new Spanish sounds, <ç>, with a subscript (sometimes superscript) <z>, appears from the earliest monuments of Castilian. The use of the cedilla has also been observed in the oldest charters written in Provençal (hence its later presence in Catalan) and in French. [Translated from French]

Selig also notes that the diacritic spread across Europe more slowly than its phonetic value, and was in some cases "reappropriated" by different languages to represent sounds unrelated to its original function.

In French, according to Jean Dubois, the cedilla appears "as early as the 8th century in Visigothic manuscripts, but was little used by scribes, who preferred to add an extra letter to indicate the sibilant sound of c (they wrote receut, aperceut)".

Accordingly, in the manuscripts of The Song of Roland, the cedilla is not used, although modern transcriptions add it for ease of reading.

== Paleographic e cedilla (e caudata) ==
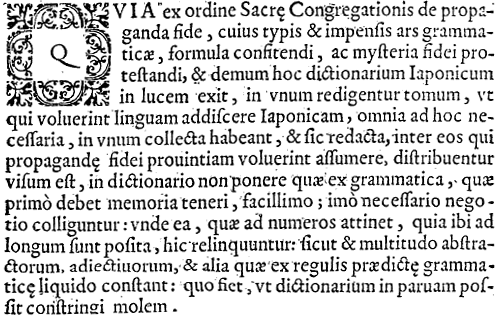
Excerpt from a Latin book published in Rome in 1632. An e caudata appears in the words Sacrę, propagandę, prædictę, and grammaticę (alongside the form grammaticæ). The typographic e caudata was adopted during the Renaissance from the much older manuscript e caudata (as in The Song of Roland).

A form resembling a cedilla can therefore be found beneath the letter e in medieval manuscripts, with usage attested as early as the 6th century in uncial script. The resulting letter is known as e caudata ("e with a tail", also called "tailed e"). It more or less frequently replaces the Latin digraph ae (often written as the ligature æ, a convention that later spread more widely). This digraph generally represented an open /ɛ/ (originally long, until distinctions of vowel length disappeared), derived from the Classical Latin diphthong /ae̯/, which was monophthongized from the 2nd century onward.

This usage continued in manuscripts until the 18th century but did not survive the advent of printing:

[The scribe of The Song of Roland wrote] ciel or cel with an e cedilla because, until the 13th century, Latin words in æ or œ were often written with an e cedilla; recognizing the Latin cælum beneath the French cel, he allowed himself (which has no meaning in French) to use an e cedilla (vv. 545, 646, 723, 1156, and 1596). [Translated from French]

It is noteworthy that this letter, represented here as ę (with an ogonek) or ȩ (with a cedilla), has been preserved in Romance philological transcription, whereas the digraph ae (in its ligatured form æ, known as ash) has been retained in the transcription of Germanic languages. ę was used in manuscripts of Old English written in Insular Irish uncial.

Although this sign is often referred to as a "cedilla", this is an anachronism: it has no connection with the letter z, and it more likely derives from a subscript a.

This cedilla-like mark, whose use varied before the spread of printing, can therefore serve as an indicator for the dating of manuscripts by palaeographers. For example, according to the Dictionnaire de paléographie by Louis Mas Latrie (1854), "manuscripts in which one finds the e cedilla rather than œ must be placed between five and seven hundred years ago [Translated from French]", that is, between 1150 and 1350:

The letter e with a cedilla for æ therefore seems to characterize the eleventh century. Mabillon, De Re Diplomatica, p. 367, supports this thesis. He already shows ę for ae in the tenth century, e.g. suę for suae, ex sacramentario Ratoldi, no. 587. But he also shows that this usage was not yet general and cites Galliae, ex ms. codice Remigio. His citations of fragments from the eleventh century generally contain ę for ae. "Ex codice nostro S. Germani, 527: sapię for sapientiae." In the twelfth century, the same scholar shows ę for oe, while plain e is used for ae. "Ex Flora Corb. nos. 488 and 489, pęno for poena (beginning of the twelfth century); dicte ecclesie for dictae ecclesiae." Charters provide the most compelling evidence and seem to prove that e with a cedilla used for ae, when the usage is general, denotes the eleventh century. [Translated from French]

=== Early printing ===
Manuscript usage was taken up in printing, first by Spanish and Portuguese printers, and then imitated by the French printer Geoffroy Tory. According to Auguste Bernard, as early as 1509, "Tory proposed writing with a cedilla the penultimate e of the third person plural of the perfect tense of verbs of the third conjugation (emere, contendere, etc.) in order to distinguish it from the infinitive," following the model already used shortly before 1509 in the Psalterium quintuplex. If Bernard's account is followed, the cedilla would therefore have been used in Latin printing by Tory from the very beginning of the 16th century.

The cedilla in French, in the form of c-cedilla, was first explicitly advocated in 1529 by the same author, in the introduction to his book Champ fleury, published in 1529 (with printing privilege dated 5 September 1526).

Its subtitle clearly expresses its purpose: l'art et la science de la due et vraie proportion de la lettre ("the art and science of the proper and true proportion of the letter"). This work is, moreover, the first typographical treatise written in French:

C before o, in French pronunciation and language, is sometimes hard, as in coquin, coquard, coq, coquillard; sometimes it is soft, as in garcon, macon, francois, and other similar words. [Translated from French]

⟨Çç⟩ in sans-serif and serif display

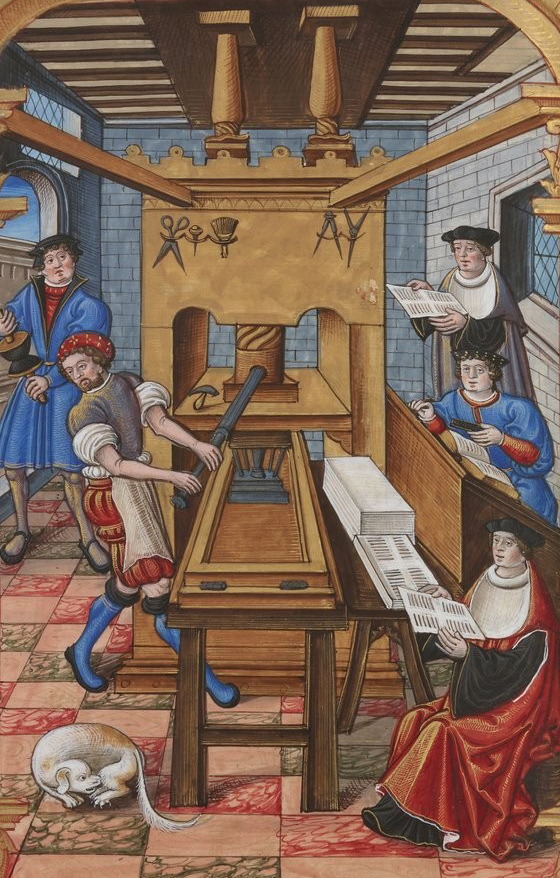
A printing workshop in the 15th century.

This defense of the cedilla was not immediately put into practice. In Tory's system, the cedilla was intended to mark /s/ (and no longer /ts/, since this phoneme had simplified in French by the 13th century and in Old Castilian between the 14th and 16th centuries). The cedilla formed part of Geoffroy Tory's typographical innovations (along with the comma and the apostrophe), whose aim was likely to facilitate the commercialization of the first books printed in French rather than Latin.

He used the cedilla in French for the first time in Le sacre et coronnement de la royne by Guillaume Bochetel, published in 1531.

According to many authors, Tory generalized the use of c-cedilla in his edition of L'Adolescence Clémentine by Clément Marot, the fourth edition of the work, published in 1533. The book had first appeared on 12 August 1532 in Paris, published by Roffet, without cedillas, and then on 7 June 1533 by Tory, this time with cedillas.

In reality, Tory had already introduced the cedilla at the beginning of 1530 in his pamphlet Le sacre et le coronnement de la Royne, imprime par le commandement du Roy nostre Sire, where it appears three times, in the words façon, commença, and Luçon.

The 1533 edition of L'Adolescence Clémentine nevertheless represents the first true generalization of the cedilla in a work that enjoyed success and was intended for a relatively large print run for the period. Tory justified the use of the cedilla in the introduction to this edition using the same arguments already advanced in Champ fleury:

[published] with certain marked accents, namely on the masculine é as distinct from the feminine, on words joined together by synaloephas, and under the ç when it takes on the pronunciation of s, which until now, through lack of consideration, had not been done in the French language, although it was and remains very necessary. [Translated from French]

The practical application of Tory's orthographic system is irregular: apostrophes are missing in par faulte dadvis, and oddly placed in combien q'uil—likely a typographical error. As Bernard observes, this was the first work in which Tory applied his orthographic system, and the inexperience of his compositors is evident in the mistakes made by omission or transposition.

From this point onward, the cedilla was adopted by all printers. Before this, supporters of etymological orthography wrote francoys. Usage initially remained unstable. For example, in the Œuvres poétiques of Louise Labé (published by Jean de Tournes in 1555), one finds the cedilla in aperçu but not in perſa (modern perça), which is instead written with an s to avoid perca.

From there, the use of the "c with a tail" (its earliest name) spread throughout France, but it was not until the 17th century that its use became truly common.

In Spanish, the cedilla was abandoned in the 18th century (ç being replaced by z or simple c before e and i), while /ts/ had simplified to /s/ between the 14th and 16th centuries and then to /θ/ in the 17th century. Other related languages (Catalan, French, Portuguese) nevertheless retained it.

=== After the Renaissance ===
The introduction (and subsequent retention) of such a character in written French was an effective and broadly accepted way of definitively resolving the problem of the ambiguous pronunciation of the Latin letter c. Indeed, when c precedes a, o, or u, it is pronounced /k/; when it precedes any other vowel, it is pronounced /s/. The sign therefore makes it possible to preserve links with the past and to maintain the graphic coherence of the language by making spelling less ambiguous. The presence of a cedilla in a word or form keeps visible the relationships with the etymon and with derived forms or related forms.

For Albert Dauzat, "the simplification of an irrational orthography was in keeping with the tendencies of the 17th century, enamoured of clarity and reason. Many writers called for reform [...]". The cedilla therefore became a stake in the many projects for orthographic reform of the French language.

==== T-cedilla in French ====
With regard to these attempts at orthographic reform, the history of the t-cedilla in French is exemplary.

In 1663, in Rome la ridicule, Caprice by Saint-Amant, the printer and proofreader for the Elzeviers in Amsterdam, Simon Moinet, used the cedilla under the letter t in French (for example, he wrote invanţion).

In 1766, Jean-Raymond de Petity, preacher to the queen, proposed the use of the cedilla under t to distinguish cases where it is read /t/ from those where it is pronounced /s/:

One could still derive another benefit from the cedilla in favour of children and foreigners, who are often embarrassed about how they should pronounce the letter t in certain words; this would be to apply this sign to that letter when it has the value of s, as in the words minutie, portion, faction, quotien, etc. By this expedient its pronunciation would be regulated, and one would no longer confuse the cases where it has its natural value, as in the words partie, question, digestion, chrétien. When it costs so little to remedy imperfections, it is gratuitously wishing to perpetuate them to allow them to subsist. [Translated from French]

The cedilla in French, a diacritic that nearly enabled a major simplification of French orthography.

Ambroise Firmin-Didot, in his Observations sur l'orthographe, ou ortografie, française (1868), proposed to the Académie française a similar reform project aiming to introduce a t-cedilla, ţ (depending on configuration, this may appear as a comma rather than a cedilla), in words where t is pronounced /s/ before i. This would have eliminated a large number of irregularities in spelling (nous adoptions ~ les adoptions, pestilence ~ pestilentiel, il différencie ~ il balbutie). One would thus have written: les adopţions, pestilenciel (with c preferred in order to agree better with the base pestilence), il différencie, il balbuţie.

In fact, as the author himself notes, the grammarians of Port-Royal had already proposed such an improvement before him (by means of a t with a subscript dot: les adopṭions). The project ultimately remained a dead letter.

==== Açhille, çhien, çheval: the proposals of Nicolas Beauzée ====
In the same spirit as that of Firmin-Didot, the generalization of c- and t-cedilla was defended by an Enlightenment grammarian such as Nicolas Beauzée. Thus, according to the 19th-century encyclopedist B. Jullien:

[The celebrated grammarian Nicolas Beauzée], who devoted himself extensively to the modifications to be introduced into our orthography in order to regularize it, wished to generalize the use of the cedilla, and derived such advantage from it that one can only regret that the Academy did not take up this project in order to introduce it into our writing. According to Beauzée, the cedilla should indicate not only for the letter c, but also for other letters when appropriate, and notably for t, the transition from a hard sound to a sibilant sound. This being the case, a simple cedilla would eliminate certain spelling differences that nothing justifies.

Thus one writes monarque with qu, and monarchie with ch; Beauzée proposed that ch written without a cedilla should always be pronounced /k/, and that the sibilant ch, that of chien and cheval, should be written with a cedilla, çhien, çheval: one would then write monarche and monarçhie. The etymology would be preserved, and the pronunciation exactly represented.

We write chœur and pronounce /kœʁ/; we write and pronounce chose; and this diversity of pronunciation is often a difficulty for those who do not know French. According to Beauzée, one should write chœur and çhose, Achaïe and Açhille, Michel-Ange and arçhevêque, and so on; note that this would hardly be a change in spelling, merely an extremely slight addition, which nevertheless would have the happiest results for all. How is it that the body established to guide the French language does not make every effort to adopt such wise corrections?

Beauzée quite reasonably extended the application of the cedilla to the letter t. Indeed, this letter very often takes in French the sibilant sound of s, without there being any general rule for this. Thus nous portions and des portions, nous inventions and des inventions, are written exactly the same way and pronounced differently; Beauzée proposed placing the cedilla under the t pronounced as s. Immediately all difficulty would disappear, and etymology would be preserved. The same was to apply in all such words as minutie, calvitie, etc., where t takes the sound of s. By reciprocity, one could later restore the c-cedilla in some words from which it has been improperly removed to make room for plain c. Such is the case, for example, with mince derived from minutus, accourcir derived from court, where the c not present in the root was substituted, under the influence of pronunciation, for the t required by etymology.

One could multiply such examples; it suffices for me to have shown how one might successively introduce into our orthography some perfectly rational changes which, after a short time, would render it regular, while not offending usage. Assuredly this would be a fine service rendered to our language. [Translated from French]

Moreover, it would have been possible to write the words lança and français using the letter s, since the phoneme /ts/ no longer existed at the time of the borrowing of the cedilla. The phoneme had even merged with the other /s/ sounds. However, it was the visual and etymologizing appearance of the word that prevailed. The spelling *lansa would have introduced an awkward alternation: *il lansa ~ ils lancèrent. In other languages, such as Spanish, the spelling of a conjugated verb may be inconsistent: one now writes lanzar, thus "cutting oneself off" from the Latin etymology lanceare, which was more explicitly reflected in lançar (though it reappears in alternation with lance in the present subjunctive).

In addition to maintaining visual etymological coherence, the cedilla also makes it possible, in certain cases, to resolve spelling problems for the sound /s/ derived from /k/. For example, reçu retains a link with recevoir, but above all could not be written in any other way: *resu would be read /ʁəzy/ and *ressu /resy/. The same applies to leçon and other words in which a schwa is followed by the phoneme /s/. In other cases, plain c without a cedilla is retained. The retention of c in such words is explained by an orthographic archaism: the Latin or French etymon remains visible, allowing greater visual coherence by preserving a link between the cedilla-marked derived form and the root from which it originates. In this way, lança and lançons remain clearly and visually connected to the root lanc- /lɑ̃s/ of lancer, lance, etc. Likewise, reçu retains a link with recevoir. Conversely, when the sound /k/ must be obtained before the graphic vowels e, i, and y, a u is used as a diacritic letter following c: accueil.

Used as a diacritic detached from its original c, the cedilla was extended to other letters in other languages from the 19th century onward.

=== Chronology of the appearance of the cedilla ===
- Before the 9th century, occurrences of the Visigothic cedilla (ʒ), which was shortened to ç in the 11th century.
- In parallel, the palaeographic e cedilla (e caudata) is attested as early as the 6th century.
- 9th century – Cantilène de sainte Eulalie: a hapax of the diacritic z, intended to be shortened to ç, appears in the form czo.
- 1480 – Birth of Geoffroy Tory in Bourges.
- Before 1500 – Spanish and Portuguese printers create typefaces for the cedilla; these enter France via Toulouse.
- 1509 – Tory innovates in Latin printing (cedillas on the e of the verbs emere, contendere).
- 1529 (completed in 1526) – Tory argues for the introduction of the cedilla into French in Champ fleury.
- Early 1530 – Tory introduces the cedilla in Le sacre et le coronnement de la Royne, imprime par le commandement du Roy nostre Sire.
- June 7, 1533 – Publication of the fourth edition of L'Adolescence clémentine by Tory, representing a major dissemination of the cedilla.
- October 1533 – Death of Geoffroy Tory.
- 18th century – The cedilla disappears from Spanish; it is used by all printers in France. Nicolas Beauzée proposes its generalization in place of s. Numerous spelling reform attempts follow: some call for abandoning the cedilla, others for generalizing it. However, this diacritic, successfully established by Tory shortly before his death in 1533, has retained essentially the same rules of use down to the present day.

=== Etymology ===
Although the cedilla appeared in French manuscripts as early as the 9th century and in French printing from 1530 onward, the word cédille itself is attested only in 1611, in the altered form cerille, and then as cédille in 1654–1655. The word cerilla had, however, already been borrowed from Spanish in 1492, and the form cedilla is attested in 1558. In Spanish, cedilla means "little z" and is the diminutive of the name of the letter z in Spanish, zeda (now obsolete, like ceda; the current name being zeta), itself derived from the Latin zeta, from Greek zêta, "the sixth letter of the Greek alphabet". Greek zêta is itself "borrowed from Phoenician (cf. Hebrew zajit, Arabic zayn)".

In his article in the Encyclopédie, and later in his Œuvres, the term cedilla was mistakenly interpreted by Dumarsais in French as meaning "little c" rather than "little z", due to the shape of the cedilla:

The term cédille comes from the Spanish cedilla, which means "little c"; for the Spaniards also have, like us, the c without a cedilla, which then has a hard sound before the three letters a, o, u; and when they wish to give a soft sound to the c preceding one of these three letters, they subscript the cedilla to it, which they call c con cedilla, that is, c with cedilla. Moreover, this character might well derive from the Greek sigma represented thus Ϛ, as we have noted under the letter c (sic); for the c with cedilla is pronounced like s at the beginning of the words sage, second, si, sobre, sucre. [Translated from French]

== Current usage ==
=== Romance languages ===
In French, Catalan, Occitan (more widespread in the classical orthography), and Portuguese, the Hispanic cedilla is used under the letter c to indicate /s/ before a, o, and u. In Catalan and Occitan (classical orthography only), -ç is also used word-finally to indicate /s, for example in dolç ("sweet").

Friulian uses a cedilled c to represent [tʃ].

==== Romanian ====
T and s with subscript comma and t and s with cedilla in the Times New Roman font.

In Romanian, the diacritic plays a much more prominent role: Ș ș (formerly: Ş ş) [ʃ], and Ț ț (formerly: Ţ ţ) [ts]. After having been written using so-called Glagolitic characters of Church Slavonic until the 19th century, Romanian has since been written in the Latin alphabet. Its orthography then drew partly on Italian and French models, and partly, especially with regard to letters bearing diacritics, on transliteration practices close to those of the Balkan linguistic area. The most recent major reforms date from 1953, followed by more chaotic changes after the end of communism. Modern Romanian normally uses two letters with a subscript comma.

In 2003, the Romanian Academy specified that the letters ș and ț share the same diacritic: a comma placed a short distance beneath the letters s and t, rather than a cedilla.

Because the ISO/IEC 8859-2 and Unicode standards initially treated the Romanian subscript comma as merely a graphic variant of the cedilla, cedilled s (U+015E, U+015F) became widespread in computing, especially since it also exists in Turkish (allowing a single ISO character set for both languages). Cedilled t (U+0162, U+0163), however, has most often continued to be represented as a t with a subscript comma, primarily for aesthetic reasons. As a result, modern fonts most often display an s with a cedilla and a t with a cedilla shaped like a comma.

Unicode now distinguishes the two characters, as shown in the illustration. The characters named "Latin capital letter S with comma below" (U+0218) and "Latin small letter s with comma below" (U+0219), as well as "Latin capital letter T with comma below" (U+021A) and "Latin small letter t with comma below" (U+021B), are preferred in careful typography.

For alphabetical sorting, the two Romanian letters with subscript comma (or cedilla) are considered distinct letters, ordered after s and t.

=== Turkic languages ===
Çç [tʃ], Şş [ʃ]

Both letters have been used in the orthography of Turkish since the romanization adopted on November 1, 1928. They are regarded as distinct letters, ordered respectively after c and s, and not as variants of those letters. The use of ç for [t͡ʃ] may have been inspired by Albanian usage, while ş appears to follow Romanian practice.

The Turkmen alphabet, adopted in 1991 following the independence of Turkmenistan, is largely inspired by Western alphabets, and particularly by Turkish. As in Turkish, it includes Çç [tʃ] and Şş [ʃ].

==== Azerbaijani ====
Çç [t͡ʃ]
Şş [ʃ]

In Azerbaijani, the cedilla is used, for example, in içmək [ˈit͡ʃmæk] ("to drink") and danışmak [daniʃmak] ("to consult").

==== Tatar ====
In the Tatar Latin alphabet Jaᶇalif (Yañalif) or Yañalatinitsa ("new Latin alphabet"), which was adopted in 1999 and is commonly used on the Internet, two letters with a cedilla are employed:

Çç [ɕ], [t͡ʃ] or [t͡s]
Şş [ʃ]

In the literary Tatar language (in Kazan), the letter ç is pronounced [ɕ], while c is [ʑ]. In the western and southern parts of the Tatar-speaking area (Mişär), ç is [t͡ʃ], or [t͡s] in the north, and c is [d͡ʒ]. In Siberia, in the eastern part of the Tatar-speaking area, ç is [ts], and c is [ʒ].

=== Albanian ===
Çç [tʃ]

In the current orthography of Albanian, adopted in 1908 at the Congress of Monastir, the letter ç is used to represent [t͡ʃ].

=== Latvian ===
- Ģģ [ɟ]
- Ķķ [c]
- Ļļ [ʎ]
- Ņņ [ɲ]
- Ŗŗ [r]

Latvian uses a cedilla in the form of a "subscript comma" to indicate the palatalization of the consonants /g/, /k/, /l/, /n/, and /r/, written as ģ, ķ, ļ, ņ, and ŗ. For reasons of legibility, this diacritic is placed above the lowercase g, where it may take several forms, including a curved quotation mark, an inverted comma, or an acute accent. For the uppercase G, where legibility is not an issue, the diacritic remains below: Ģ.

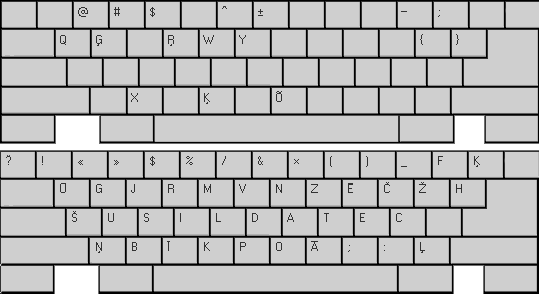
Latvian keyboard layout (rarely used).

As the pronunciation of r and ŗ is no longer distinguished in standard Latvian, the latter letter was removed from the orthography during the years of Soviet occupation. This reform was generally not accepted by Latvians in exile. After Latvia regained independence in 1991, ŗ was nevertheless not reinstated in the official orthography.

Latvian orthography, derived from German, introduced cedillas in order to enrich an alphabet of German origin that was insufficient to represent all Latvian sounds. Thus, Ģ, Ķ, Ļ, and Ņ still denote the palatalized equivalents of G, K, L, and N. Until the beginning of the 20th century, Latvian orthography was highly irregular.

=== Other alphabets ===
Some recently created alphabets directly inspired by the Latin alphabet have added numerous diacritics to address mismatches between sounds and letters. A well-known example is Vietnamese, which does not use the cedilla. By contrast, the Marshallese alphabet does include it, and is often cited as a notable example of an alphabet devised by linguists studying the language.

==== Kurdish ====
Çç [t͡ʃ]
Şş [ʃ]

In Kurdish, examples include şer ("war") and piçûk ("small").

==== Marshallese ====
- Ļ, ļ /ɫ/
- m̧ /mʷ/
- Ņ, ņ /ɳ/
- o̧ /oː/

Marshallese (a Malayo-Polynesian language spoken in the Marshall Islands) is written using a Latin alphabet that includes several unusual cedilled letters: l, m, n, and o, namely ļ, m̧, ņ, and o̧. Of these, only l and n exist as precomposed Unicode characters (as of Unicode version 4). The others must be composed using the combining cedilla U+0327. Care should be taken not to encode o with cedilla as o with an ogonek (ǫ).

According to a foundational grammar available online, ļ would correspond to /ɫ/, m̧ to /mʷ/ (labialized /m/), ņ to /ɳ/ (retroflex /n/), and o̧ to a type of long /oː/. These values are not confirmed by a study of Marshallese phonology, which does not discuss the current orthography.

==== Cameroonian languages ====
The General Alphabet of Cameroonian Languages recommends avoiding diacritics above graphemes to modify phonetic value, reserving that position for tone marking. Diacritics below graphemes are therefore preferred for phonetic modification. The cedilla is one such diacritic, indicating nasalization in practice, notably in Dii, Kako, Karang, Maka, Mbodomo, Mundani, Pana, and Vute.

Nasalized vowels marked with a cedilla include:

- A̧, a̧
- Ȩ, ȩ
- Ɛ̧, ɛ̧
- Ə̧, ə̧
- I̧, i̧
- Ɨ̧, ɨ̧
- O̧, o̧
- Ɔ̧, ɔ̧
- U̧, u̧

==== Kinande ====
In Kinande, the cedilla is used to indicate advanced tongue root articulation in vowels, notably i and u:

- I̧, i̧
- U̧, u̧

==== Indigenous languages of the Americas ====
Saanich uses a spacing cedilla ⟨¸⟩ for glottal stop, and in digraphs for glottalized consonants.

In the orthographies developed by the New Tribes Mission for Jodï, Maco, and Piaroa, the cedilla is used to indicate nasalized vowels.

=== Languages with ogoneks ===
The cedilla should not be confused with the ogonek, which is not discussed in this article. Languages such as Navajo, Apache, Polish, and, as in the example below, Lithuanian, do not use cedillas but ogoneks:

- Ą, ą
- Ę, ę
- Į, į
- Ų, ų

=== Phonetic transcription ===
In the International Phonetic Alphabet, ç represents the voiceless palatal fricative. This sound does not occur in French.

Alan Timberlake uses the cedilla to indicate consonant palatalization in a Russian grammar published in 2004: p̧ b̧ ţ ḑ ķ ģ ç̆ ʒ̧̆ ş ş̆ x̧ v̧ z̧ z̧̆ m̧ ņ ļ ŗ.

== ASCII and ISO 646 transcription ==
Basic ASCII (the American version of the ISO/IEC 646 standard encoding characters from 0 to 127) does not include letters with diacritics. At a time when it was often the only available code page, some users simulated the cedilla by placing a comma after the letter; for example, writing c,a for ça.

However, national variants of ISO 646 used the few non-invariant positions of the standard to encode additional punctuation marks and diacritics:

- The French version (standard NF Z 62010-1982, deposited with ECMA by AFNOR) encodes the lowercase c with cedilla at position 124, replacing the | character of the American version.
- An earlier French version (standard NF Z 62010-1973, obsolete since 1985) required the use of the backspace control character (BS, code 8) to overstrike characters and simulate the addition of a diacritic, except for letters already encoded with diacritics in the national variant; thus the cedilla could be encoded as <BS ; comma> following an uppercase C.
- The Spanish, Catalan, and Basque versions of ISO 646 (registered with ECMA by IBM or Olivetti) encode uppercase and lowercase c with cedilla at positions 93 and 125 respectively, replacing the ASCII characters ] and }.
- The Portuguese versions (registered with ECMA by IBM or Olivetti) encode uppercase and lowercase c with cedilla at positions 92 and 124 respectively, replacing the ASCII characters \ and |.
- The Italian version (registered with ECMA by Olivetti) encodes the lowercase c with cedilla at position 92, replacing the ASCII \.
- The French, Spanish, Portuguese, German, Hungarian, Norwegian, Swedish, and Greek variants of ISO 646 continue to refer to the cedilla as a possible representation of the comma (although they do not prescribe any specific use of a control character for this purpose).

== Bibliography ==
- Bernard, Auguste (1837). "Du premier emploi dans l'imprimerie et dans la langue française, de l'apostrophe, de l'accent et de la cédille" [On the first use in printing and in the French language of the apostrophe, the accent, and the cedilla]. Bulletin du bibliophile belge (in French).
- Firmin-Didot, Ambroise (1868). Observations sur l'orthographe, ou ortografie, française [Observations on French orthography, or ortografie] (in French). Paris: Ambroise Firmin Didot.
- Daniels, Peter T.; Bright, William (1996). The World's Writing Systems. Oxford and New York: Oxford University Press. pp. xlvi + 920. ISBN 978-0-19-507993-7.
- Huchon, Mireille (2002). Histoire de la langue française [History of the French language] (in French). Paris.
- Steffens, Franz (1910). Paléographie latine [Latin paleography] (in French). Paris: Honoré Champion.
- Timberlake, Alan (2004). A reference grammar of Russian. Cambridge University Press. ISBN 978-0-521-77292-1.

== See also ==
- Diacritic
- French orthography
