= Ț =

Latin letter T with comma

T-comma

T-comma (majuscule: Ț, minuscule: ț) is a letter which consists of a t with a diacritical comma underneath it, and is distinct from t-cedilla. It is part of the Romanian alphabet, used to represent the Romanian language sound /t͡s/, the voiceless alveolar affricate (like the letter ⟨c⟩ in Slavic languages that use the Latin alphabet). The letter is also a part of the Finno-Ugric Livonian language alphabet, representing the /c/ sound.

It is written as the letter T with a small comma below and it has both the lower-case (U+021B) and the upper-case variants (U+021A).

The letter was proposed in the Buda Lexicon, a book published in 1825, which included two texts by Petru Maior, Orthographia romana sive Latino-valachica una cum clavi and Dialogu pentru inceputul limbei române, introducing ș for /ʃ/ and ț for /t͡s/.

== Software support ==
T-comma was not part of early Unicode versions; it was introduced only in Unicode 3.0.0 (September 1999) at the request of the Romanian national standardization body. Thus, some legacy systems do not have fonts compatible with it; for example, Microsoft's Windows XP requires installing the European Union Expansion Font Update. Full support of this letter has been available on Macintosh computers since Mac OS X and on PC since Windows Vista. Although accessibility issues are a concern only on legacy systems, because of inertia or ignorance, or both, some newly-produced Romanian texts still use Ţ (T-cedilla, available from Unicode version 1.1.0, June 1993).

The letter is placed in Unicode in the Latin Extended-B range, under "Additions for Romanian", as the "Latin capital letter T with comma below" (U+021A) and "Latin small letter t with comma below" (U+021B). In HTML these can be encoded by &#x021a; and &#x021b;, respectively.

Appearance of comma (upper row) and cedilla (lower row) in the Times New Roman font. Note that the cedilla is placed higher than the comma.

In Windows XP, most of the fonts including Arial Unicode MS render T-cedilla as T-comma because T-cedilla was not believed to be used in any language. (It is in fact used, but in very few languages. T with Cedilla exists as part of the General Alphabet of Cameroon Languages, in some Gagauz orthographies, in local spelling usages for the Kabyle language, and possibly elsewhere.) Technically, this is incorrect as a mismatching glyph is associated with a certain character code. Therefore, text written using S-cedilla and T-cedilla can often look as if it had been written using S-comma and T-comma. However, in order to correctly encode and render both S-comma and T-comma, one has to install the European Union Expansion Font Update. There is no official way to add keyboard support for these characters. In order to type them, one has to either install third-party keyboards, or use the Character Map.

All Linux distributions are able to correctly render S-comma and T-comma, since at least 2005. If these characters are missing from a certain font, they will be substituted with the glyph from another font. Although the X.Org Server supports the correct keyboard (ro comma) since at least 2005, selecting this keyboard from the user interface (e.g. GNOME Keyboard Properties) has only recently been made possible.

== Character encoding ==
Character information
Preview	Ț		ț	
Unicode name	LATIN CAPITAL LETTER T WITH COMMA BELOW		LATIN SMALL LETTER T WITH COMMA BELOW	
Encodings	decimal	hex	dec	hex
Unicode	538	U+021A	539	U+021B
UTF-8	200 154	C8 9A	200 155	C8 9B
Numeric character reference	&#538;	&#x21A;	&#539;	&#x21B;

== See also ==
- T-cedilla (Ţ)
- D-comma (D̦)
- S-comma (Ș)
- Other diacritics confused with the cedilla
