= Nicolas Beauzée =

French linguist and author

Nicolas Beauzée (9 May 1717 in Verdun, Meuse – 23 January 1789 in Paris) was a French linguist, author of Grammaire générale (published 1767) and one of the main contributors to the Encyclopédie of Denis Diderot and Jean-Baptiste le Rond d'Alembert on the topic of grammar. In 1772 he was named as the successor to Charles Pinot Duclos in the Académie française.

== Life and work ==
=== Early years and tenure at École Militaire ===
Beauzée was born on 9 May 1717 in Verdun. The Church register for the parish of Saint-Sauveur lists his father as a labourer (manouvrier). A scholarship allowed him to attend the Jesuit college at Verdun.
