= Montenegrin language =

Standard variety of Serbo-Croatian

Montenegrin
- crnogorski / црногорски crnogorski jezik, црногорски језик
- Pronunciation: [tsr̩nǒɡorskiː]
- Native to: Montenegro
- Ethnicity: Montenegrins
- Native speakers: c. 215,000 (2023)
- Language family: Indo-European: Balto-Slavic; Slavic; South Slavic; Western; Serbo-Croatian; Montenegrin
- Writing system: Latin (Montenegrin Latin alphabet); Cyrillic (Montenegrin Cyrillic alphabet); Yugoslav Braille

Official status
- Official language in: Montenegro
- Recognised minority language in: Mali Iđoš municipality (Serbia)
- Regulated by: Board for Standardization of the Montenegrin Language

Language codes
- ISO 639-2: cnr
- ISO 639-3: cnr
- Glottolog: mont1282
- Linguasphere: part of 53-AAA-g

Montenegrin (Note: pronounced /ˌmɒntɪˈniːɡrɪn, -ən/ MON-tih-NEE-grin, -ən or /-ˈneɪɡrən/ -NAY-grən or /-ˈnɛɡrən/ -NEH-grən) (crnogorski / црногорски [tsr̩nǒɡorskiː]) is the standard variety of the Serbo-Croatian language mainly used by Montenegrins. It is the official language of Montenegro. Montenegrin is based on the most widespread dialect of Serbo-Croatian, Shtokavian, more specifically on Eastern Herzegovinian, which is also the basis of Standard Serbian, Croatian, and Bosnian.

The language used in Montenegro has historically and traditionally been called Serbian. The idea of a Montenegrin standard language distinct from Serbian is a relatively recent political development that emerged in the late 1990s and early 2000s after the breakup of Yugoslavia. It was closely associated with movements advocating Montenegrin independence from Serbia and Montenegro. Following independence, Montenegrin was designated the official language of Montenegro in 2007 with the adoption of a new constitution.

== History ==
The beginnings of Montenegrin literacy date back to the 9th century, during the Duklja period, with the establishment of numerous monasteries in the coastal region. While traces of Latin and Greek literacy from the Duklja period are partially preserved, there is only indirect evidence of literacy in the Slavic language. The use of Glagolitic script in Duklja was influenced by the strong center of Slavic literacy in Ohrid, although some argue that Slavic literature in Duklja was written in Latin script. Literary activity flourished around Lake Skadar during this period, with the Monastery of Prečista Krajinska as a significant center.

The Zeta period begins with the fall of Duklja to Serbian rule and extends through the rule of the Balšić and Crnojević families. While there is no consensus on the dating of Glagolitic and Cyrillic scripts in present-day Montenegro, it is established that Old Church Slavonic and Cyrillic became dominant during the Zeta period, replacing Glagolitic script.

In Zeta was established a printing press by Đurađ Crnojević with creation process by Serbian Orthodox Hilandar Hieromonk Makarije printer, starting in Obod and later moving to Cetinje. This press produced five incunabula, making modern-day Montenegro one of the four Slavic nations with incunabula. During this period there was a development of redaction of Old Church Slavonic, exemplified by the Serbia's UNESCO's Memory of the World international register Miroslav Gospel from the 12th century, written in Kotor. This redaction adapted Old Church Slavonic to the local Serbian language of medieval Zeta, influencing later Montenegrin redaction. Despite being erroneously labeled as Zeta-Hum redaction, it originated in Zeta and then spread to Hum.

The period of written language spans from the late 15th to the 18th century. During this time, written language represents the written realization of the local spoken language. In new socio-historical circumstances in Montenegro, there was a gradual shift towards the reintegration of the Montenegrin language with a popular basis. However, Old Church Slavonic continued to be used in the Orthodox Church for a long time. In this phase, Old Church Slavonic books and Cyrillic script dominated. Yet, in the coastal region, the influence of the Montenegrin type of Old Church Slavonic had little impact on the literature of the period, where Latin and Italian language prevailed.

The written language in secular use continued to follow the development of the Montenegrin spoken language, progressively shedding Church Slavonic elements as time passed. The most significant writers during the period of written language emerged in the late Baroque period - Andrija Zmajević in the coastal part Bay of Kotor and Danilo Petrović-Njegoš in the continental part Cetinje. Both wrote in the Serbian vernacular.

From the second half of the 18th century, strengthened by the state and church organization, conditions were created for the establishment of the uncodified Montenegrin literary language as a means of common communication across the territory under the jurisdiction of the state and church. Even before the birth of Vuk Stefanović Karadžić, Ivan-Antun Nenadić from Perast advocated for the phonetic orthographic principle, emphasizing that writing should reflect how people speak and pronounce. This rule was applied early in Montenegrin literature, making it unsurprising that Vuk Karadžić's linguistic reforms were later accepted without significant issues. In the period of the uncodified Montenegrin literary language, three styles can be observed: literary, business, and scientific, all formed in the process of spontaneous Montenegrin linguistic standardization. Montenegrin literature, both linguistically and thematically, originated from everyday life. In the period in question, the highest achievement of such literary language is seen in the letters of Petar I Petrović-Njegoš.

As a result of Vuk Karadžić's linguistic reform, during the transitional period of the Montenegrin language (from the 1830s to World War I), significant changes occurred, and some typical Montenegrin linguistic features were officially abolished. Throughout this period, the language in Montenegro was officially referred to as Serbian, and the assimilation of the Montenegrin language toward the general štokavian Karadžić model was primarily implemented through textbooks and external teaching staff that wholeheartedly followed the principles of Vuk Karadžić's linguistic reform.

Vuk's principle of introducing the vernacular into literature encountered little opposition in Montenegro, as it was already present there before Vuk. However, the complete acceptance of all aspects of this reform did not proceed smoothly, leading to divisions among Montenegrin cultural figures. In lengthy debates, Jovan Pavlović (a consistent follower of Vuk) and Lazar Tomanović stood out, with Tomanović advocating for the introduction of graphemes ś and ź. Đuro Špadijer, in his Serbian Grammar (intended for 3rd and 4th grades in Montenegrin elementary schools), introduced some characteristics considered by Vuk's model as dialectal and provincial.

However, from the school year 1863/64, Montenegro began the continuous implementation of Karadžić's linguistic reform in Cetinje schools. This reform would ultimately achieve a definitive victory in Montenegro by the end of the 19th century, primarily in administrative, journalistic, and scientific styles.

The literary style, which retained fundamental Montenegrin linguistic features, resisted this process the longest and mostly remained beyond the reach of the mentioned reform, entering the 20th century with preserved foundational Montenegrin language characteristics. The preservation of typical Montenegrin language features in the literary style is evident in the works of three representative figures from that period: Petar II Petrović-Njegoš, Stefan Mitrov Ljubiša, and Marko Miljanov Popović.

=== Yugoslav era ===
The most significant changes in the Montenegrin literary language occurred during the phase marked by the influence of Serbian linguist Aleksandar Belić, between the two World Wars. Montenegrin linguistic peculiarities, preserved in the literary style in the first two decades of the 20th century, were assimilated into the common "Serbo-Croatian" linguistic template in the new socio-historical framework. Although Belić's Orthography from 1923 formally allowed the use of ijekavian, he emphasized in that edition and subsequent ones that jekavian jotization is a dialectal phenomenon. Consequently, Montenegrins were obligated to use atypical non-jotized forms such as "djed" (grandfather), "cjedilo" (strainer), "tjerati" (to drive), "sjesti" (to sit), and so on.

In subsequent editions, Belić abolished the normative status of the so-called longer endings of pronominal-adjective declension (-ijem, -ijeh) and codified only the short endings. This led Vuk's language model to be gradually abandoned by his followers. Despite the formal acknowledgment of ijekavian in literary language, the interwar period in Montenegro was marked by an increasing use of ekavian. The introduction of ekavian was implemented through education, as textbooks and teaching staff predominantly followed ekavian norms. This is vividly illustrated by writings in the Montenegrin press of that time.

The contemporary stage in the development of the Montenegrin literary language encompasses the period after World War II, with the improvement of the country's status, the language's standing also improved. Although Montenegro did not gain the right to name its language with its own name, during this period, institutions promoting the Montenegrin language were substantively developed. Associations and organizations like the Montenegrin PEN Center, Matica crnogorska, Duklja Academy of Sciences and Arts, the Institute for Montenegrin Language and Linguistics, and the Montenegrin Society of Independent Writers played a crucial role in preserving Montenegrin values. The Declaration on the Constitutional Status of the Montenegrin Language by the Montenegrin PEN Center in 1997 was a significant document emphasizing the autonomy of the Montenegrin language.

=== Independence era ===
These efforts culminated in the new Montenegrin Constitution of 2007, where the Montenegrin language gained official status for the first time. The establishment of the Council for the Standardization of the Montenegrin Language in 2008 and the adoption of the Montenegrin Spelling Book in 2009 represent significant steps in the standardization and affirmation of the Montenegrin language.

== Language standardization ==
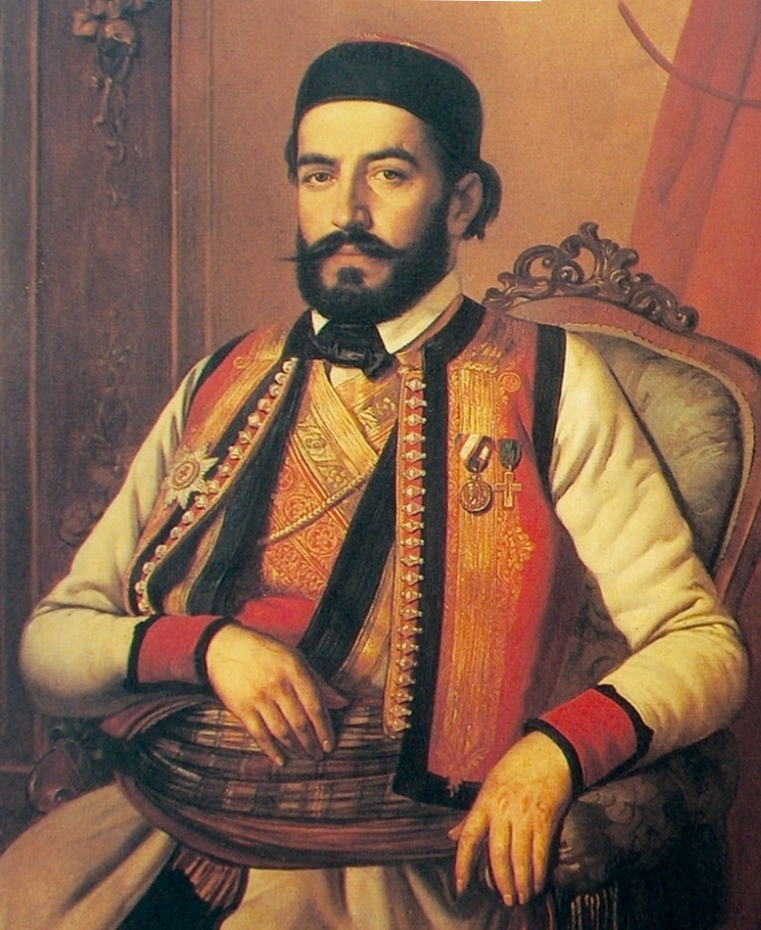
Petar II Petrović-Njegoš was a Prince-Bishop of Montenegro, poet and philosopher whose works are widely considered some of the most important in Montenegrin and Serbian literature.

In 2008, the government of Montenegro formed the Board for Standardization of the Montenegrin Language, which aims to standardize the national language according to international norms. Proceeding documents will, after verification, become a part of the educational programme in Montenegrin schools.

The first Montenegrin standard was officially proposed in 2009. In addition to the letters prescribed by the Serbo-Croatian standard, the proposal introduced two additional letters, ⟨ś⟩ and ⟨ź⟩, to replace the digraphs ⟨sj⟩ and ⟨zj⟩. The Ministry of Education accepted neither of the two drafts of the Council for the Standardization of the Montenegrin language, but instead adopted an alternate third one which was not a part of their work. The Council has criticized this act, saying it comes from "a small group" and that it contains an abundance of "methodological, conceptual and linguistic errors". On 21 June 2010, the Council for General Education adopted the first Montenegrin Grammar.

The first written request for the assignment of an international code was submitted by the Montenegrin authorities to the technical committee ISO 639 in 2008, with complete paperwork forwarded to Washington in 2015. After a long procedure, the request was finally approved on 8 December 2017, and ISO 639-2 and ISO 639-3 code [cnr] was assigned to the Montenegrin language, effective 21 December 2017.

== Official status and number of speakers ==
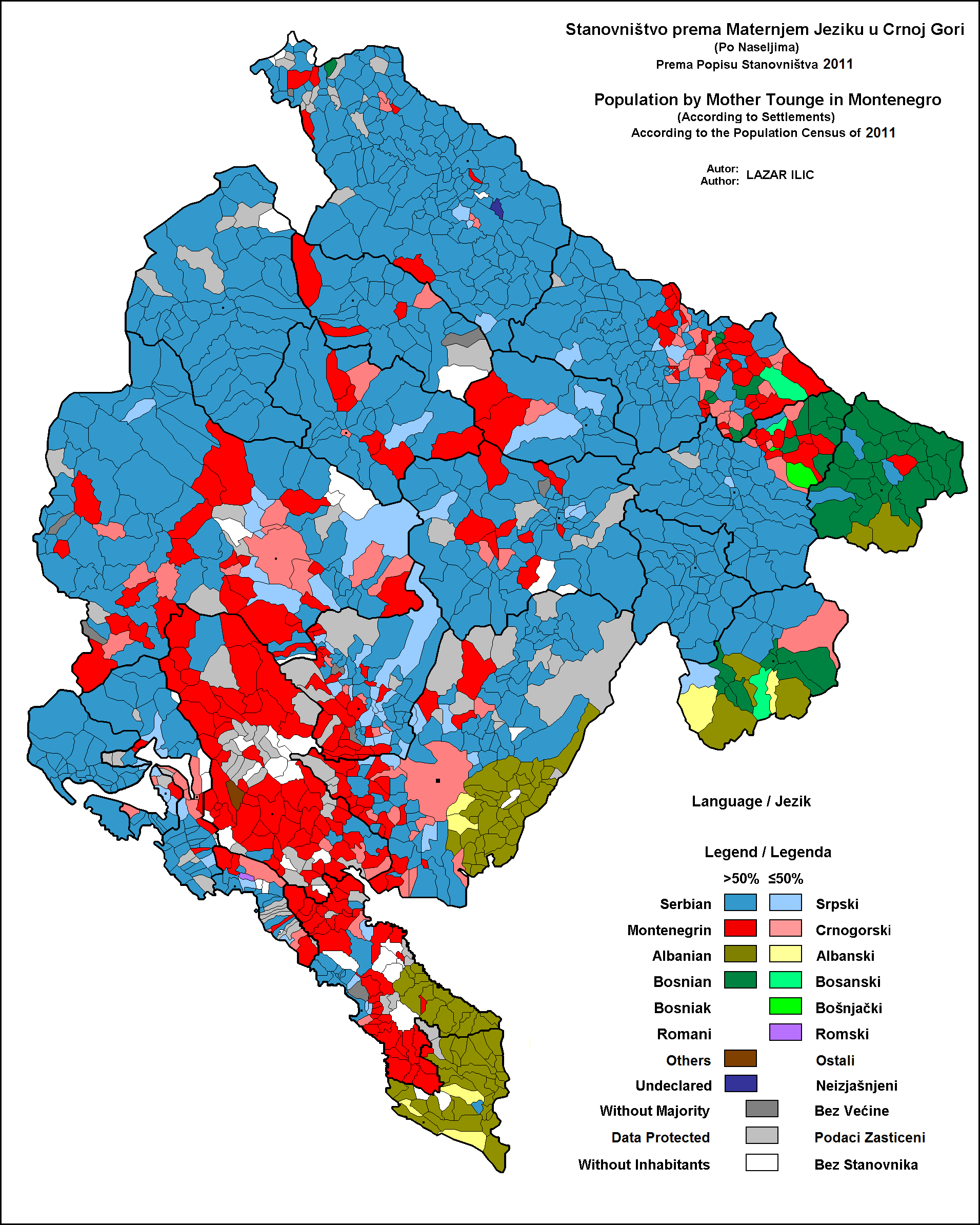
Linguistic structure of Montenegro by settlements, 2011 census

Linguistic structure of Montenegro by municipalities, 2011 census

The question of the official language remains a controversial issue in Montenegro.

In the Principality/Kingdom of Montenegro, the language in use was Serbian. Approximately 95% of the population declared Serbian as their mother tongue in the first population census in then-Montenegro, in 1909. Serbian was the officially used language name in Socialist Republic of Montenegro until after the 1954 Novi Sad Agreement, while Serbo-Croatian was introduced into the 1974 Constitution of the Socialist Republic of Montenegro. In the censuses of 1981 and 1991, the vast majority of inhabitants of Montenegro, 510,320 or 83% of the population, declared themselves speakers of Serbo-Croatian. According to the 1992 Constitution of Montenegro, the official language was 'Serbian language of the ijekavian dialect'. Organizations promoting Montenegrin as a distinct language have appeared in early 2000s when the then-ruling Democratic Party of Socialists of Montenegro introduced usage of the term. The 2007 Constitution of newly independent Montenegro deems Montenegrin to be the official language.

According to data from the 2023 census, some 215,299 people or 34.5% of the total population declared that their native language was Montenegrin, while 269,307 or 43.2% of the total population declared Serbian as their mother tongue. In the 2022 census in Serbia, 1,981 people declared Montenegrin as their mother tongue.

== Classification ==
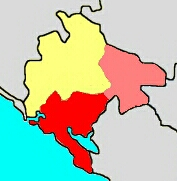
Shtokavian subdialects in Montenegro (Zeta–Raška dialect in red and light red; Eastern Herzegovinian dialect in yellow)

Montenegrin is a standard variety of Serbo-Croatian, a Slavic language (Indo-European), of the South Slavic subgroup.

Shtokavian dialect, which is a prestige supradialect of the pluricentric Serbo-Croatian, serves as a basis for the Montenegrin language. Some of the dialects are shared with the neighbouring Slavic languages, such as the Eastern Herzegovinian dialect and the Zeta–Raška dialect. The Eastern Herzegovinian dialect is spoken in the majority of Montenegro and Bosnia and Herzegovina, as well as areas in Croatia and Serbia, with Montenegro only partially codifying the dialect. The Zeta–Raška dialect is prevalent in mostly southern Montenegro and parts of the historical region of Raška in Serbia. It is mainly spoken by local ethnic Serbs, Montenegrins, Bosniaks and Muslims.

== Writing ==
The proponents of the separate Montenegrin language prefer to use Gaj's Latin alphabet over the Serbian Cyrillic. In both scripts, the Montenegrin alphabets have two additional letters (bold), which are easier to render in digital typography in the Latin alphabet due to their existence in Polish, but which must be created ad hoc using combining characters when typesetting Cyrillic.

Latin	Cyrillic	IPA value
A a	А а	/ä/
B b	Б б	/b/
C c	Ц ц	/t͡s/
Č č	Ч ч	/t͡ʂ/
Ć ć	Ћ ћ	/t͡ɕ/
D d	Д д	/d/
Dž dž	Џ џ	/d͡ʐ/
Đ đ	Ђ ђ	/d͡ʑ/
E e	Е е	/e/
F f	Ф ф	/f/
G g	Г г	/ɡ/
H h	Х х	/x/
I i	И и	/i/
J j	Ј ј	/j/
K k	К к	/k/
L l	Л л	/l/

Latin	Cyrillic	IPA value
Lj lj	Љ љ	/ʎ/
M m	М м	/m/
N n	Н н	/n/
Nj nj	Њ њ	/ɲ/
O o	О о	/ɔ/
P p	П п	/p/
R r	Р р	/ɾ/
S s	С с	/s/
Š š	Ш ш	/ʂ/
Ś ś	С́ с́	/ɕ/
T t	Т т	/t/
U u	У у	/u/
V v	В в	/v/
Z z	З з	/z/
Ž ž	Ж ж	/ʐ/
Ź ź	З́ з́	/ʑ/

Latin collation order
Latin	A	B	C	Č	Ć	D	Dž	Đ	E	F	G	H	I	J	K	L	Lj	M	N	Nj	O	P	R	S	Š	Ś	T	U	V	Z	Ž	Ź
Cyrillic	А	Б	Ц	Ч	Ћ	Д	Џ	Ђ	Е	Ф	Г	Х	И	Ј	К	Л	Љ	М	Н	Њ	О	П	Р	С	Ш	С́	Т	У	В	З	Ж	З́

Cyrillic collation order
Cyrillic	А	Б	В	Г	Д	Ђ	Е	Ж	З	З́	И	Ј	К	Л	Љ	М	Н	Њ	О	П	Р	С	С́	Т	Ћ	У	Ф	Х	Ц	Ч	Џ	Ш
Latin	A	B	V	G	D	Đ	E	Ž	Z	Ź	I	J	K	L	Lj	M	N	Nj	O	P	R	S	Ś	T	Ć	U	F	H	C	Č	Dž	Š

== Literature ==
Many literary works of authors from Montenegro provide examples of the local Montenegrin vernacular. The medieval literature was mostly written in Old Church Slavonic and its recensions, but most of the 19th century works were written in some of the dialects of Montenegro. They include the folk literature collected by Vuk Stefanović Karadžić and other authors, as well as the books of writers from Montenegro such as Petar Petrović-Njegoš's The Mountain Wreath (Gorski vijenac), Marko Miljanov's The Examples of Humanity and Bravery (Primjeri čojstva i junaštva), etc. In the second half of the 19th century and later, the Eastern Herzegovinian dialect, which served as a basis for the standard Serbo-Croatian language, was often used instead of the Zeta–South Raška dialect characteristic of most dialects of Montenegro. Petar Petrović-Njegoš, one of the most respectable Montenegrin authors, changed many characteristics of the Zeta–South Raška dialect from the manuscript of his Gorski vijenac to those proposed by Vuk Stefanović Karadžić as a standard for the Serbian language.

For example, most of the accusatives of place used in the Zeta–South Raška dialect were changed by Njegoš to the locatives used in the Serbian standard. Thus the stanzas "U dobro je lako dobar biti, / na muku se poznaju junaci" ('It is easy to be good in good times / heroes reveals themselves in trials') from the manuscript were changed to "U dobru je lako dobar biti, / na muci se poznaju junaci" in the printed version. Other works of later Montenegrin authors were also often modified to the East Herzegovinian forms in order to follow the Serbian language literary norm. However, some characteristics of the traditional Montenegrin Zeta–South Raška dialect sometimes appeared. For example, the poem Onamo namo ('There, over there') by Nikola I Petrović-Njegoš, although it was written in the East Herzegovinian Serbian standard, contains several Zeta–South Raška forms: "Onamo namo, za brda ona" ('There, over there, beyond those hills'; accusative, instead of instrumental case za brdima onim), and "Onamo namo, da viđu (instead of vidim) Prizren" ('There, over there, I see Prizren'), and so on.

== Language politics ==
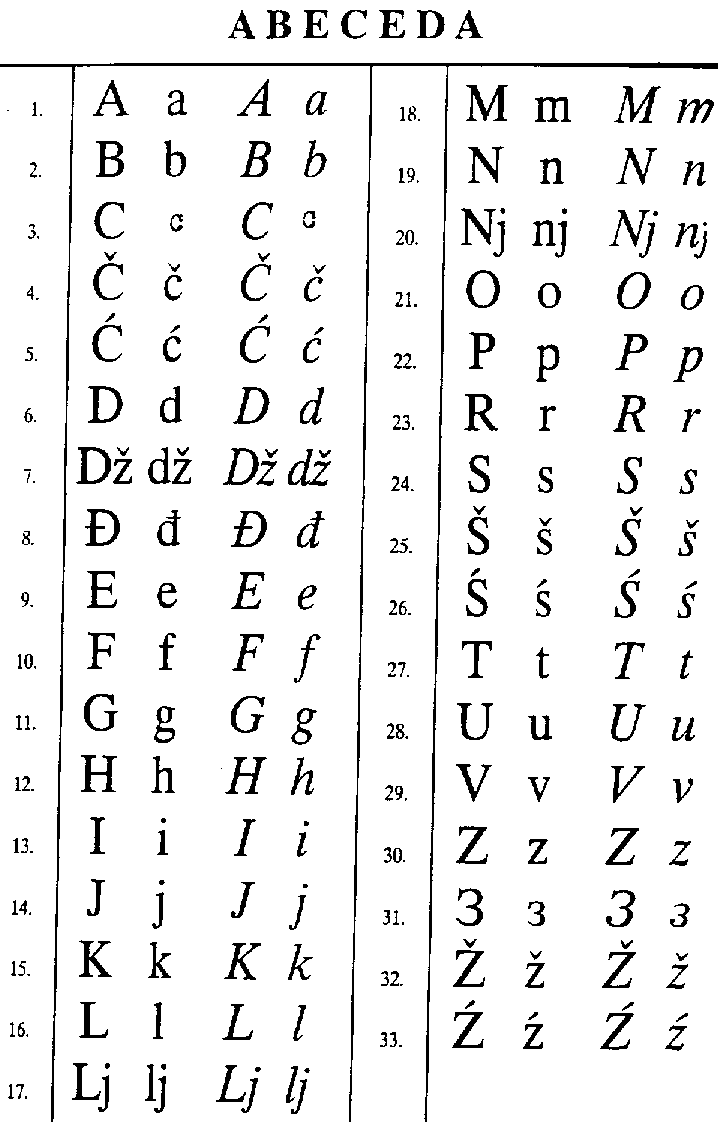
A proposed Montenegrin alphabet which contains three more letters than the Serbian counterpart — Ś, З and Ź

Most mainstream politicians and other proponents of the Montenegrin language state that the issue is chiefly one of self-determination and the people's right to call the language what they want, rather than an attempt to artificially create a new language when there is none. The Declaration of the Montenegrin PEN Center states that the "Montenegrin language does not mean a systemically separate language, but just one of four names (Montenegrin, Serbian, Croatian and Bosnian) by which Montenegrins name their part of [the] Shtokavian system, commonly inherited with Muslims, Serbs and Croats". Therefore, in 2017, numerous prominent writers, scientists, journalists, activists and other public figures from Montenegro, Croatia, Bosnia and Herzegovina, and Serbia signed the Declaration on the Common Language, which states that in Montenegro, Croatia, Serbia, and Bosnia and Herzegovina a common polycentric standard language is used, consisting of several standard varieties, similar to the situation of languages like German, English or Spanish.

The introduction of the Montenegrin language has been supported by Matica crnogorska, among other important institutions, but met opposition from the Montenegrin Academy of Sciences and Arts. The chief proponent of Montenegrin was Zagreb-educated Vojislav Nikčević, professor at the Department of Language and Literature at the University of Montenegro and the head of the Institute for Montenegrin Language in Podgorica. His dictionaries and grammars were printed by Croatian publishers since the major Montenegrin publishing houses such as Obod in Cetinje opted for the official nomenclature specified in the Constitution (Serbian until 1974, Serbo-Croatian from 1974 to 1992, Serbian again from 1992 to 2007). Nikčević advocates amending the Latin alphabet with three letters Ś, Ź, and З and corresponding Cyrillic letters С́, З́ and Ѕ (representing IPA [ɕ], [ʑ] and [dz] respectively).

Opponents acknowledge that these sounds can be heard by many Montenegrin speakers; however, they do not form a language system and thus are allophones rather than phonemes. In addition, there are speakers in Montenegro who do not utter them and speakers of Serbian and Croatian outside of Montenegro (notably in Herzegovina and Bosanska Krajina) who do. In addition, the introduction of those letters could pose significant technical difficulties (the Eastern European character encoding ISO/IEC 8859-2 does not contain the letter З, for example, and the corresponding letters were not proposed for Cyrillic).

Then–prime minister Milo Đukanović declared his open support for the formalization of the Montenegrin language by declaring himself as a speaker of Montenegrin in 2004 interview with Belgrade daily Politika. Official Montenegrin government communiqués started to be given in English and Montenegrin on the government's webpage.

In 2004, the government of Montenegro changed the school curriculum so that the name of the mandatory classes teaching the language was changed from "Serbian language" to "Mother tongue (Serbian, Montenegrin, Croatian, Bosnian)". This change was made, according to the government, in order to better reflect the diversity of languages spoken among citizens and to protect human rights of non-Serb citizens in Montenegro who declare themselves as speakers of other languages.

This decision resulted in a number of teachers declaring a strike and parents refusing to send their children to schools. The towns affected by the strike included Nikšić, Podgorica, Berane, Pljevlja, and Herceg Novi. The new letters had been used for official documents since 2009, but in 2017, the Assembly of Montenegro removed them from the official webpage.

== Sample text ==
Article 1 of the Universal Declaration of Human Rights in Montenegrin, written in the Latin alphabet:

"Sva ljudska bića rađaju se slobodna i jednaka u dostojanstvu i pravima. Ona su obdarena razumom i savješću i jedni prema drugima treba da postupaju u duhu bratstva."

Article 1 of the Universal Declaration of Human Rights in Montenegrin, written in Montenegrin Cyrillic alphabet:

"Сва људска бића рађају се слободна и једнака у достојанству и правима. Она су обдарена разумом и савјешћу и једни према другима треба да поступају у духу братства."

Article 1 of the Universal Declaration of Human Rights in English:

"All human beings are born free and equal in dignity and rights. They are endowed with reason and conscience and should act towards one another in a spirit of brotherhood."

== See also ==
- Comparison of Serbo-Croatian standard varieties
- Pluricentric Serbo-Croatian language
- Language secessionism in Serbo-Croatian
- Declaration on the Common Language
- Controversy over ethnic and linguistic identity in Montenegro
- Dialects of Serbo-Croatian
- Mutual intelligibility
