= Montenegrin alphabet =

Montenegrin Latin alphabet and Montenegrin Cyrillic alphabet

The Montenegrin alphabet encompasses the Montenegrin variants of Latin and Cyrillic alphabet, the two writing systems of Montenegrin language, a standard variant of Serbo-Croatian. They are based on Gaj's Latin and Serbian Cyrillic alphabet respectively, both expanded by two letters, ⟨ś⟩ and ⟨ź⟩ in Latin, and ⟨с́⟩ and ⟨з́⟩ in Cyrillic, in order to represent phonemes /ɕ/ and /ʑ/. The letters of the two alphabets correspond to each other one-to-one, allowing nearly unambiguous conversion from one to the other, as is also the case for Gaj's Latin and Serbian Cyrillic.

The new letters were officially introduced in 2009. Usage of the new letters is not mandatory, and the traditional spellings as found in other varieties of Serbo-Croatian remain standard in Montenegrin as well. Although Cyrillic and Latin are recognised as equal scripts by the Constitution of Montenegro, in contemporary usage the Latin script is predominant.

== Background ==
Historically, in Montenegrin area as well as some of the Ijekavian Štokavian dialects outside it, an additional process of iotation, so-called "youngest" or "newest iotation" (as opposed to the more widespread and historically earlier iotations of type vík-ati – *vik-jem → vȋč-ēm), has taken place. It traditionally hasn't been regarded as standard in Serbo-Croatian, and it produced forms of the following type:

djèvōjka [djěʋoːjka] > đèvōjka [d͡ʑěʋoːjka] 'girl'

tjȅrati [tjêrati] > ćȅrati [t͡ɕêrati] 'to force, to drive (away)'

sjȕtra [sjûtra] > śȕtra [ɕûtra] 'tomorrow'

zjȅnica [zjênit͡sa] > źȅnica [ʑênit͡sa] 'pupil (eye)'

The forms on the left are standard in all Ijekavian variants of Serbo-Croatian (except for sjȕtra – outside of Montenegro the standard form is sȕtra). In 2009, the forms on the right have also been declared standard in Montenegrin. While the letters representing the outcome of iotation in first two examples already existed in the Serbo-Croatian Latin and Cyrillic alphabet, the other two types of iotation required new letters.

== Latin alphabet ==
Montenegrin Latin alphabet
- Script type: alphabet
- Period: since 2009
- Languages: Montenegrin

Related scripts
- Parent systems: Egyptian hieroglyphs: Proto-Sinaitic alphabet; Phoenician alphabet; Greek alphabet; Old Italic scripts; Latin alphabet; Czech alphabet; Gaj's Latin alphabet; Montenegrin Latin alphabet

ISO 15924
- ISO 15924: Latn (215), Latin

Unicode
- Unicode alias: Latin
- Unicode range: subset of Latin (Basic Latin and Latin Extended-A)

The Montenegrin Latin alphabet (Montenegrin: crnogorska latinica / црногорска латиница, crnogorska abeceda / црногорска абецеда or crnogorski alfabet / црногорски алфабет) is used for writing the Montenegrin language in Latin script.

- uppercase: A B C Č Ć D Dž Đ E F G H I J K L Lj M N Nj O P R S Š Ś T U V Z Ž Ź
- lowercase: a b c č ć d dž đ e f g h i j k l lj m n nj o p r s š ś t u v z ž ź

It uses most letters of the ISO basic Latin alphabet, with the exception of Q, W, X and Y, only used for writing common words or proper names directly borrowed from foreign languages.

Montenegrin Latin is based on Gaj's Latin alphabet, with the addition of two letters ⟨Śś⟩ (/ɕ/) and ⟨Źź⟩ (/ʑ/). The two letters are taken from the Polish alphabet, where they represent the same sounds.

The alphabet also uses other Latin letters with diacritics, composed with a basic Latin letter and one of two combining diacritics (the acute accent or caron, over ⟨C⟩, ⟨S⟩, and ⟨Z⟩), and a supplementary base consonant ⟨Đ⟩. It also includes some digraphs that are regarded as single letters for collation purpose: ⟨Dž⟩, ⟨Nj⟩, and ⟨Lj⟩.

== Cyrillic alphabet ==
Montenegrin Cyrillic alphabet
- Script type: alphabet
- Period: since 2009
- Languages: Montenegrin

Related scripts
- Parent systems: Egyptian hieroglyphs: Phoenician alphabet; Greek alphabet (partly Glagolitic alphabet); Early Cyrillic alphabet; Serbian Cyrillic alphabet; Montenegrin Cyrillic alphabet

ISO 15924
- ISO 15924: Cyrl (220), Cyrillic

Unicode
- Unicode alias: Cyrillic
- Unicode range: subset of Cyrillic (U+0400...U+04FF)

The Montenegrin Cyrillic alphabet (Montenegrin: црногорска ћирилица / crnogorska ćirilica or црногорска азбука / crnogorska azbuka) is the official Cyrillic script of the Montenegrin language. It is used in parallel with the Latin script.

- uppercase: А Б В Г Д Ђ Е Ж З З́ И Ј К Л Љ М Н Њ О П Р С С́ Т Ћ У Ф Х Ц Ч Џ Ш
- lowercase: а б в г д ђ е ж з з́ и ј к л љ м н њ о п р с с́ т ћ у ф х ц ч џ ш

Compared to Serbian Cyrillic alphabet as codified by Vuk Stefanović Karadžić in early 19th century, it also includes letters ⟨З́з́⟩ (/ʑ/) and ⟨С́с́⟩ (/ɕ/). Before being codified as standard, they were used in scholarly dialectological publications.

== History and status ==
=== Before codification ===
The nonstandard sounds ś and ź were described and notated (in Latin alphabet) in this manner by Pero Budmani in 1867. Afterwards, Lazar Tomanović proposed Cyrillic spelling ⟨шј⟩ for ś.

In Socialist Federal Republic of Yugoslavia the linguists and the state viewed Serbo-Croatian as a single language with two variants ("eastern", corresponding to Serbian, and "western", corresponding to Croatian), as expressed in the Novi Sad Agreement (1954). However, over time a number of Croatian linguists started expressing contrary views, arguing for greater independence of Croatian standard, which resulted in the breakup of Novi Sad Agreement and passing of the Declaration on the Name and Status of the Croatian Literary Language in 1967.

In that context, starting in the late 1960s, Montenegrin linguist Vojislav Nikčević started promoting the idea of Montenegrin as a distinct language as well, and promoting ideas of Montenegrin nationalism in general. Regarding the alphabet required to represent this distinct standard, in his 1998 Crnogorski pravopis (Montenegrin Orthography) Nikčević proposed the addition of Latin letters ⟨ś⟩, ⟨ź⟩ and ⟨з⟩, and equivalent Cyrillic ⟨з́⟩, ⟨с́⟩ and ⟨ѕ⟩ – the last ones representing /d͡z/, the voiced variant of c/ц /t͡s/. The breakup of Yugoslavia in 1992 and the 2006 Montenegrin independence referendum created the possibility to realise Nikčević's and his supporters' proposals. The 2007 Constitution of Montenegro declared Montenegrin as the official state language.

=== Orthographic manual (2009) ===
In 2008 the Council for Codification of Montenegrin Language was founded in order to produce manuals of the standard language. One of the guiding principles of work on the orthography was Nikčević's motto Write as you speak, and read as it is written (Piši kao što zboriš, a čitaj kako je napisano), in fact a minor variation of Vuk Karadžić's Piši kao što govoriš, a čitaj kao što je napisano. Upon this principle Karadžić had reformed and established phonemic Serbian orthography in the early 19th century, on the basis of vernacular Štokavian. Similarly, the Montenegrin standard would be modelled after vernacular Montenegrin Štokavian.

However, the work on the orthographic manual where the new alphabets would be introduced was stalled due to disagreements among the authors. An additional committee was formed to create a compromise solution, made up of non-Montenegrin scholars: Milenko A. Perović (Serbian philosopher), Josip Silić (Croatian linguist), and Lyudmila Vasilyeva (Ukrainian linguist). Finally, by the decree of the Montenegrin Minister of Education, Sreten Škuletić, the new orthographic norm was adopted on 9 July 2009.

The new orthographic manual (Pravopis crnogorskoga jezika), published in 2009 and revised in 2010, accepted Nikčević's proposed letters ⟨ś⟩ and ⟨ź⟩, but not ⟨з⟩, due to the unstable usage of /d͡z/ in Montenegrin dialects. The traditional "non-iotated" spelling without ⟨ś⟩ and ⟨ź⟩ has been retained as a standard option alongside the newer system.

=== Reception and effects ===
The new letters have caused controversies and extensive polemics among linguists. The critics included the Serbian dialectologist Drago Ćupić, who argued against the phonemic status of /ɕ/ and /ʑ/, since they lack phonemic distinctiveness against the sequences /sj/ and /zj/; thus, there would be no need for the new letters. In response, Milorad Nikčević argued in favour of their phonemic status. Josip Silić in his review of V. Nikčević's Montenegrin grammar (Crnogorska gramatika, 2001) found that ⟨ś⟩ or ⟨ź⟩ aren't applied with complete consistency, specifically in the cases where the corresponding sounds arise as the product of assimilation by place of articulation. The traditional spelling ⟨lišće⟩ (phonemically /lîːʃt͡ɕe/ but phonetically realised as [lîːɕt͡ɕe]) would have to be replaced with ⟨liśće⟩ (in Montenegrin phonemically /lîːɕt͡ɕe/); the same principle would apply to e.g. ⟨grožđe⟩ and ⟨čežnja⟩, which would be spelled as ⟨groźđe⟩ and ⟨čeźnja⟩. In such cases, the 2009 manual retained the traditional spelling.

The most extensive criticism of the project was provided by Montenegrin linguist Rajka Glušica, who already opposed the restandardisation during the work on the orthographic manual as a member of the Council for Codification of Montenegrin Language. She criticised the politicised and nationalistically motivated intervention into the language, and the reduction of the prestige of the standard by bringing it closer to the language of the uneducated. The latter view was criticised as elitist by linguist Jelena Šušanj. Glušica also noted inconsistencies and uncertainties in application of the new spelling norm, both among linguists and laypeople, the majority of media as of 2019 still using the traditional alphabet without ⟨ś⟩ or ⟨ź⟩.

== See also ==
- Comparison of Serbo-Croatian standard varieties
- Controversy over ethnic and linguistic identity in Montenegro

== Sources ==
- Bońkowski, Robert (2008). "Pismo Czarnogórców – historia i współczesność". Lingua Montenegrina. 1. Cetinje: Institut za crnogorski jezik i jezikoslovlje "Vojislav P. Nikčević": 191–202. doi:10.46584/lm.v1i1.21.
- Čirgić, Adnan (2008). "Fonetsko-fonološke razlike između crnogorskoga i srpskog jezika". Lingua Montenegrina. 1. Cetinje: Institut za crnogorski jezik i jezikoslovlje "Vojislav P. Nikčević": 171–189. doi:10.46584/lm.v1i1.20.
- Čirgić, Adnan (2011). Montenegrin Language in the Past and Present (PDF). Translated by Drinčić, Goran. Podgorica: Institute for Montenegrin Language and Literature. ISBN 978-9940-579-13-5.
- Đurašković, Ljiljana (2022). "[Review] Rajka Glušica. Crnogorski jezik i nacionalizam [etc.]". Journal of Slavic Linguistics. 30 (1): 149–155.
- Glušica, Rajka (2010). "Crnogorski jezik u čeljustima nacionalizma". Riječ. 4. Nikšić: Institut za jezik i književnost: 25–45.
- Glušica, Rajka (2019). "Decenija dubletne norme crnogorskog jezika". Riječ. 16. Nikšić: Institut za jezik i književnost: 9–25.
- Halilović, Senahid, ed. (2020). Bosanskohercegovački lingvistički atlas I: Fonetika (PDF). Sarajevo: Slavistički komitet. ISBN 978-9958-648-28-1.
- Henzelmann, Martin (2024). "Language in post-Yugoslav Montenegro: An unstable complex of contested values". Zeitschrift für Slawistik. 69 (2): 229–255. doi:10.1515/slaw-2024-0013.
- Ивић, Павле (1985). Дијалектологија српскохрватског језика: увод и штокавско наречје (2nd ed.). Нови Сад: Матица српска.
- Nakazawa, Takuya (2015). "The Making of "Montenegrin Language": Nationalism, Language Planning, and Language Ideology after the Collapse of Yugoslavia (1992-2011)". Südost-europäische Hefte. 4 (1): 134.
- Nikčević, Milorad (2008) [2005]. "Fonemi ś, ź, з, ć, đ u crnogorskom standardnom jeziku". Lingua Montenegrina. 2. Cetinje: Institut za crnogorski jezik i jezikoslovlje "Vojislav P. Nikčević": 25–40. doi:10.46584/lm.v2i2.37.
- Orlandić, Sanja (2011). "Jekavska jotacija u crnogorskim govorima". Lingua Montenegrina. 7. Podgorica: Institut za crnogorski jezik i književnost: 3–35. doi:10.46584/lm.v7i1.203.
- Perović, Milenko A.; Silić, Josip; Vasiljeva, Ljudmila; Čirgić, Adnan; Šušanj, Jelena, eds. (2010) [2009]. Pravopis crnogorskoga jezika (2nd ed.). Podgorica: Ministarstvo prosvjete i nauke Crne Gore.
- Silić, Josip (2009). "Nikčevićeva Crnogorska gramatika". Lingua Montenegrina. 3. Cetinje: Institut za crnogorski jezik i jezikoslovlje "Vojislav P. Nikčević": 5–13. doi:10.46584/lm.v3i1.
- Šušanj, Jelena (2022). "O zloupotrebama naučnoga diskursa u kritici crnogorske jezičke standardizacije" (PDF). In Marković, Milan; Radoman, Aleksandar; Čirgić, Adnan (eds.). Milorad Nikčević – život i djelo: Zbornik radova s međunarodnoga naučnog skupa održanog na Cetinju 8. maja 2022. Cetinje: Fakultet za crnogorski jezik i književnost. pp. 185–199.
