= Vyaz =

Vyaz may refer to:

- Vyaz (Cyrillic calligraphy), a type of Cyrillic ornate lettering
- Vyaz (rural locality), name of several rural localities in Russia
