= Sje =

Letter of the Cyrillic alphabet

- С́ с́

Usage
- Writing system: Cyrillic
- Type: Alphabetic
- Sound values: [ɕ]

Sje (С́ с́; italics: С́ с́) is a letter of the Cyrillic alphabet, formed from the Cyrillic Es (С с С с) with the addition of an acute accent. It is used in the Montenegrin alphabet, where it represents the voiceless alveolo-palatal sibilant /ɕ/. It corresponds to the Latin Ś. It is not to be confused with the Latin Ć, which represents the voiceless alveolo-palatal affricate /t͡ɕ/ (the sound of Ћ).

== Origins ==
The first proposal for the codification of /ɕ/ in Montenegrin comes from 1884. It was proposed by Lazar Tomanović, Montenegrin attorney, journalist and politician. He proposed the use of a Cyrillic digraph шј to represent the sound. He equated the digraph with the Polish letter ś. The first instance of usage of the accented Cyrillic letter с́ was in 1926 by Danilo Vušović. It came into official use in mid-2009, with the adoption of the Law on the Official Language in Montenegro. Previously, it was included in a proposal for the Montenegrin alphabet by Dr. Vojislav Nikčević in the 1970s that included 33 letters instead of present-day 32.

== Computing codes ==
Being a relatively recent letter, not present in any legacy 8-bit Cyrillic encoding, the letter С́ is not represented directly by a precomposed character in Unicode either; it has to be composed as С+◌́ (U+0301).

Character information
| Preview | С | | с | | ́ | |
|---|---|---|---|---|---|---|
| Unicode name | CYRILLIC CAPITAL LETTER ES | | CYRILLIC SMALL LETTER ES | | COMBINING ACUTE ACCENT | |
| Encodings | decimal | hex | dec | hex | dec | hex |
| Unicode | 1057 | U+0421 | 1089 | U+0441 | 769 | U+0301 |
| UTF-8 | 208 161 | D0 A1 | 209 129 | D1 81 | 204 129 | CC 81 |
| Numeric character reference | &#1057; | &#x421; | &#1089; | &#x441; | &#769; | &#x301; |
| Named character reference | &Scy; | | &scy; | | | |

== See also ==
- Ś ś : Latin letter Ś
- Ш ш : Cyrillic letter Sha
- З́ з́ : Cyrillic letter Zje
- Щ щ: Cyrillic letter Shcha
- Ć ć : Latin letter C with acute
- Cyrillic characters in Unicode
