= Djerv =

Cyrillic letter

Djerv (ꙉєрвъ)
- Ꙉ ꙉ

Usage
- Writing system: Cyrillic
- Type: Alphabetic
- Sound values: /dʑ/, /tɕ/

History
- Descendants: Ћ ћ

Djerv or Đerv (/dʒɜːrv/, JƏRV; Majuscule: Ꙉ, Minuscule: ꙉ) is one of the Cyrillic alphabet letters that was used in Old Cyrillic. It was used in many early Serbo-Croatian monuments to represent the sounds /dʑ/ and /tɕ/ (modern đ/ђ and ć/ћ). It exists in the Cyrillic Extended-B table as U+A648 and U+A649. It is the basis of the modern letters Ћ and Ђ; the former was in fact a direct revival of djerv and was considered the same letter.

Djerv is also commonly used in Serbian Cyrillic, where it was an officially used letter. When placed before the letters н and л it represented the sounds /ɲ/ and /ʎ/, which are represented by Њ and Љ today, respectively.

It can be transliterated as Ǵ.

== Spelling reforms and forming of the letters Ћ and Ђ ==
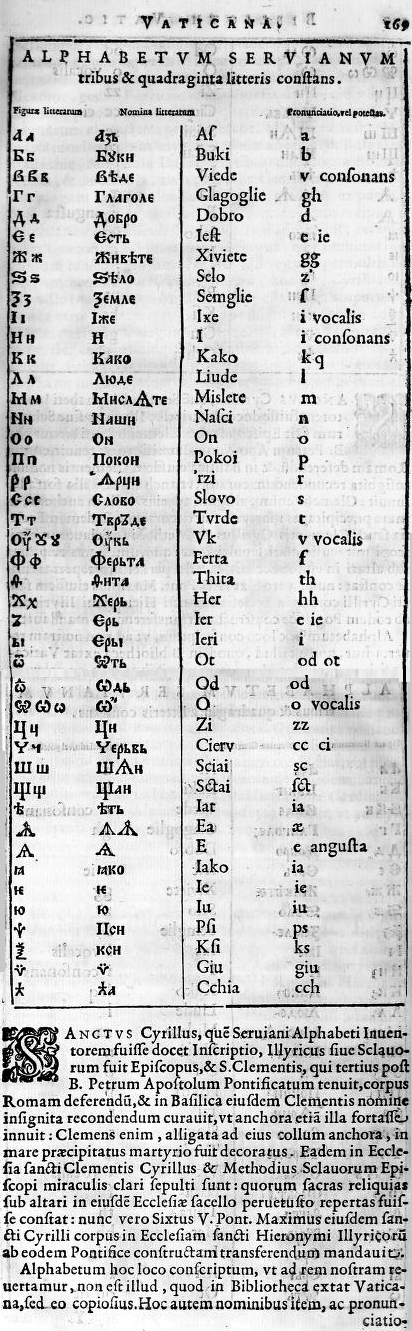
Serbian Cyrillic script, with djerv. Biblioteca Apostolica Vaticana, 16th century

The letter Ђ was formed in 1818 by Vuk Stefanović Karadžić after several proposals of reforming Djerv by Lukijan Mušicki and Gligorije Geršić. However the letter Ћ (also based on djerv) was first used by Dositej Obradović in a direct reform of djerv.

== Computing codes ==
Character information
Preview	Ꙉ		ꙉ	
Unicode name	CYRILLIC CAPITAL LETTER DJERV		CYRILLIC SMALL LETTER DJERV	
Encodings	decimal	hex	dec	hex
Unicode	42568	U+A648	42569	U+A649
UTF-8	234 153 136	EA 99 88	234 153 137	EA 99 89
Numeric character reference	&#42568;	&#xA648;	&#42569;	&#xA649;
