= Serbian Cyrillic alphabet =

Official Cyrillic writing system for Bosnian, Montenegrin and Serbian

Serbian Cyrillic alphabet Српска ћирилица / Srpska ćirilica
- Serbian Cyrillic alphabet
- Script type: Alphabet
- Period: 9th century – present
- Direction: Left-to-right
- Official script: Serbia; Kosovo; Montenegro; Bosnia and Herzegovina
- Languages: Serbian; Bosnian

Related scripts
- Parent systems: Egyptian hieroglyphs: Phoenician alphabet; Greek alphabet; Glagolitic alphabet (partly); Early Cyrillic alphabet; Serbian Cyrillic alphabet
- Child systems: Montenegrin Cyrillic alphabet

ISO 15924
- ISO 15924: Cyrl (220), Cyrillic

Unicode
- Unicode alias: Cyrillic
- Unicode range: Subset of Cyrillic (U+0400–U+04FF)

The Serbian Cyrillic alphabet (Serbian: српска ћирилица / srpska ćirilica, IPA: [sr̩̂pskaː t͡ɕirǐlit͡sa]) is a standardized variation of the Cyrillic script used to write the Serbian language and the Serbo-Croatian varieties of Bosnian and Montenegrin. (Note: In practice, the vast majority of Bosnian is written in Gaj's Latin script rather than Serbian Cyrillic. For Montenegrin, a separate Montenegrin Cyrillic alphabet exists and expands upon Serbian Cyrillic with two additional letters; these letters, however, have not entered everyday use in Montenegro. See Serbo-Croatian § Writing systems for more information.) It is the official first script of the modern standard Serbian language along with Gaj's Latin alphabet, which according to Serbian law, can be used in parallel.

It originated in medieval Serbia and was significantly reformed in the 19th century by the Serbian philologist and linguist Vuk Karadžić. Karadžić based his reform on the earlier 18th-century Slavonic-Serbian script. Following the principle of "write as you speak and read as it is written" (piši kao što govoriš, čitaj kao što je napisano), he removed obsolete letters, eliminated redundant representations of iotated vowels, and introduced the letter ⟨J⟩ from the Latin script. He also created new letters for sounds unique to Serbian phonology. According to that, Ljudevit Gaj with the help of Vuk Karadžić, led the standardization of the Latin script for use in western South Slavic languages, applying similar phonemic principles.

As a result of these parallel reforms, Serbian Cyrillic and Gaj’s Latin alphabet have a one-to-one correspondence. The Latin digraphs Lj, Nj, and Dž are treated as single letters, just as their Cyrillic counterparts are. The reformed Serbian Cyrillic alphabet was officially adopted in Principality of Serbia in 1868 and remained the sole official script into the interwar period. Both scripts were recognized in the Kingdom of Yugoslavia and the Socialist Federal Republic of Yugoslavia. During the latter period, Gaj’s Latin alphabet gained greater prominence, especially in multiethnic contexts, but also to facilitate correspondence with foreign languages such as English, German, and French.

During the period of Socialist Yugoslavia and Federal Republic of Yugoslavia, both scripts were in official use for Serbian. Since 2006 in Serbia, Cyrillic has the constitutional status of "official script", while the Latin script is designated as "script in official use" for minority and practical purposes. Cyrillic is also an official script in Montenegro and Bosnia and Herzegovina, alongside the Latin alphabet.

== Official use ==
Serbian Cyrillic is in official use in Serbia, Montenegro, and Bosnia and Herzegovina. Although Bosnia and Herzegovina and Montenegro officially recognizes both the Cyrillic and Latin scripts, the Latin alphabet is predominantly used in the Federation of Bosnia and Herzegovina, while Cyrillic is more commonly used in Republika Srpska. In Croatia, the Serbian language is officially recognized as a minority language, and the use of Serbian Cyrillic is legally protected in areas with significant Serbian populations. However, the use of Cyrillic on bilingual signs has provoked Croatian nationalist protests and acts of vandalism in some communities.

Serbian Cyrillic is widely regarded as a key symbol of Serbian national and cultural identity. In Serbia, all official documents are printed in Cyrillic only.

== Modern alphabet ==
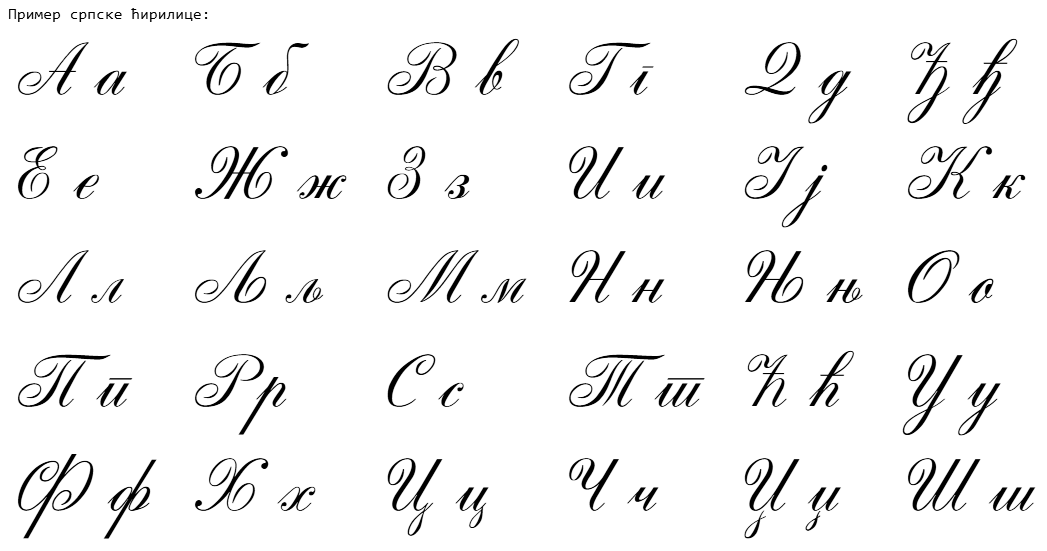
Example of typical modern cursive Serbian Cyrillic alphabet

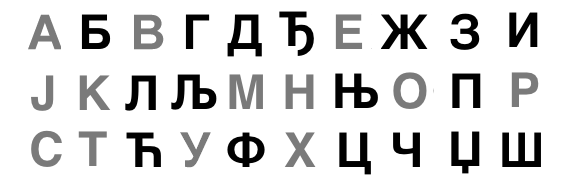
Capital letters of the Serbian Cyrillic alphabet

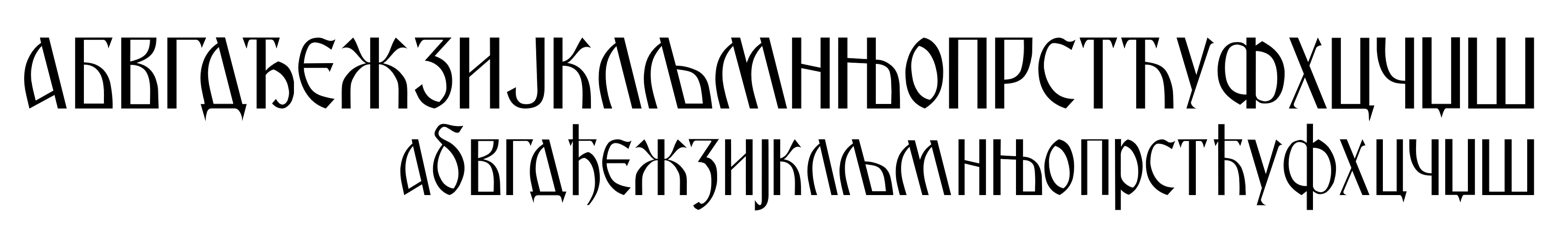
Example of typical antique style in Serbian Cyrillic alphabet

The following table provides the upper and lower case forms of the Serbian Cyrillic alphabet, along with the equivalent forms in the Gaj's Latin alphabet and the International Phonetic Alphabet (IPA) value for each letter. The letters do not have names, and consonants are normally pronounced as such when spelling is necessary (or followed by a short schwa, e.g. /fə/).:

Cyrillic	Latin	IPA value
А а	A a	/ä/
Б б	B b	/b/
В в	V v	/v/
Г г	G g	/ɡ/
Д д	D d	/d/
Ђ ђ	Đ đ	/d͡ʑ/
Е е	E e	/ɛ/
Ж ж	Ž ž	/ʐ/
З з	Z z	/z/
И и	I i	/i/
Ј ј	J j	/j/
К к	K k	/k/
Л л	L l	/l/
Љ љ	Lj lj	/ʎ/
М м	M m	/m/

Cyrillic	Latin	IPA value
Н н	N n	/n/
Њ њ	Nj nj	/ɲ/
О о	O o	/ɔ/
П п	P p	/p/
Р р	R r	/r/
С с	S s	/s/
Т т	T t	/t/
Ћ ћ	Ć ć	/t͡ɕ/
У у	U u	/u/
Ф ф	F f	/f/
Х х	H h	/x/
Ц ц	C c	/t͡s/
Ч ч	Č č	/t͡ʂ/
Џ џ	Dž dž	/d͡ʐ/
Ш ш	Š š	/ʂ/

Latin to Cyrillic
A	a	B	b	C	c	Č	č	Ć	ć	D	d	Dž	dž	Đ	đ	E	e	F	f	G	g	H	h	I	i	J	j	K	k
А	а	Б	б	Ц	ц	Ч	ч	Ћ	ћ	Д	д	Џ	џ	Ђ	ђ	Е	е	Ф	ф	Г	г	Х	х	И	и	Ј	ј	К	к
L	l	Lj	lj	M	m	N	n	Nj	nj	O	o	P	p	R	r	S	s	Š	š	T	t	U	u	V	v	Z	z	Ž	ž
Л	л	Љ	љ	М	м	Н	н	Њ	њ	О	о	П	п	Р	р	С	с	Ш	ш	Т	т	У	у	В	в	З	з	Ж	ж

== History ==
=== Early Cyrillic ===
The Cyrillic script was likely developed by the disciples of Byzantine Christian missionaries Cyril and Methodius, possibly at the Preslav Literary School in the First Bulgarian Empire toward the end of the 9th century.

The earliest form of the Cyrillic script was known as ustav, a monumental script based on Greek uncial writing. It incorporated ligatures and additional letters adapted from the Glagolitic script to represent sounds not present in Greek. At this stage, there was no distinction between uppercase and lowercase letters. The literary language used was based on the Slavic dialect spoken in the region of Thessaloniki.

=== Medieval Serbian Cyrillic ===
Part of the Serbian medieval literary heritage includes important works such as the Miroslav Gospel, Vukan Gospels, St. Sava's Nomocanon, Dušan's Code, and the Munich Serbian Psalter, among others. The first printed book in Serbian was the Cetinje Octoechos, published in 1494. A notable feature of Serbian medieval writing, particularly associated with the Resava literary school, was the extensive use of diacritical signs and the use of the Djerv (Ꙉꙉ) to represent Serbian phonological reflexes of Proto-Slavic *tj and *dj — corresponding to the modern sounds [t͡ɕ], [d͡ʑ], and [d͡ʒ]. Over time, these sounds were more systematically represented by the modern Serbian Cyrillic letters Dje (Ђђ) and Tshe (Ћћ).

=== Karadžić's reform ===
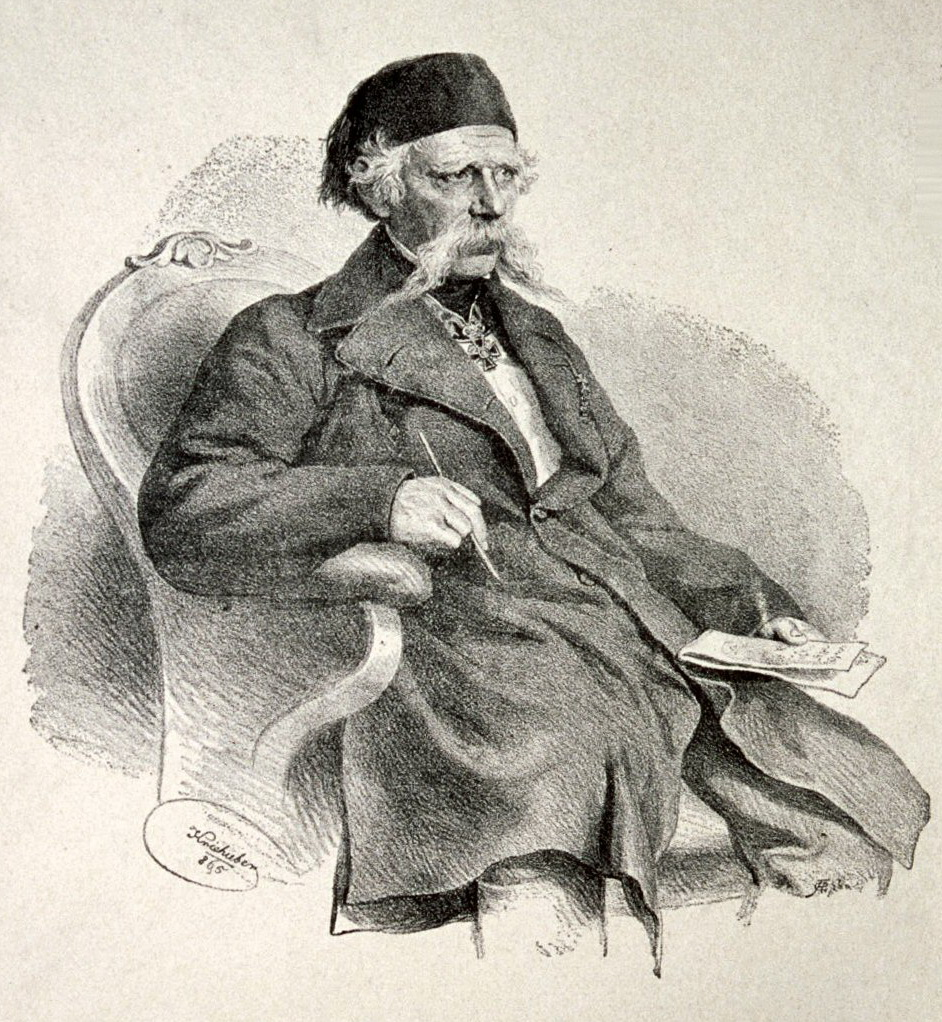
Serbian linguist Vuk Stefanović Karadžić

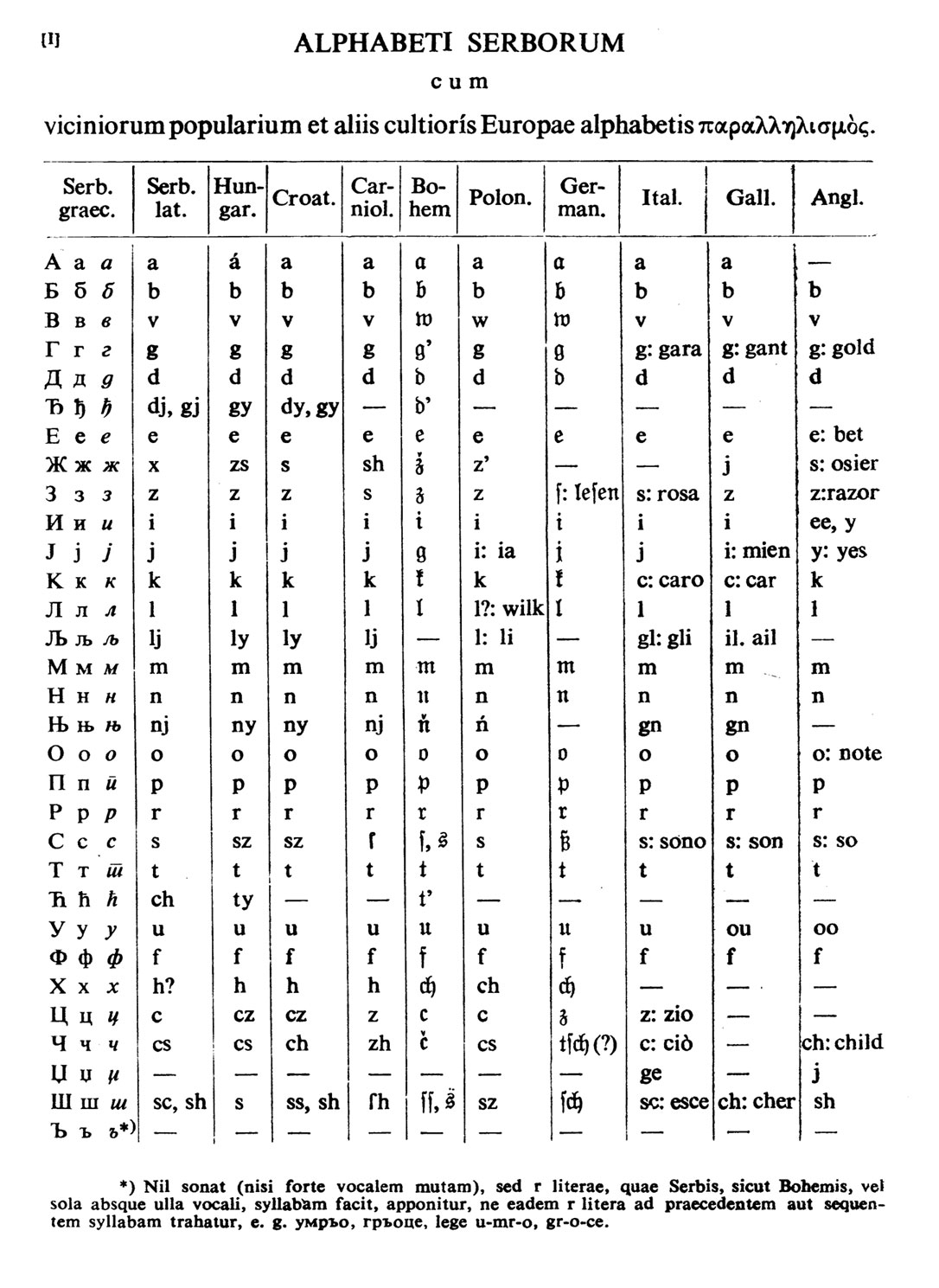
Comparative Orthography of European Languages from Karadžić's, Srpske narodne pjesme (Serbian Folk Poems), Vienna, 1841

During the Serbian Revolution, Vuk Stefanović Karadžić fled Serbia in 1813 and settled in Vienna, where he met Jernej Kopitar, a Slovene linguist and slavist. With the encouragement and support of Kopitar and Sava Mrkalj, Karadžić began reforming the Serbian language and its orthography. He finalized his reformed alphabet in 1818 with the publication of the Serbian Dictionary (Srpski rječnik). Karadžić reformed the standard Serbian language and standardized the Serbian Cyrillic alphabet based on the phonemic principle of "write as you speak and read as it is written" (piši kao što govoriš, čitaj kao što je napisano), following the model of Johann Christoph Adelung and the influence of Jan Hus’s reforms of the Czech alphabet. His reforms modernized Serbian and moved it away from the older Church Slavonic tradition (particularly the Serbian recension and Russian Church Slavonic), bringing the literary language closer to the vernacular of the common people—specifically, the Eastern Herzegovinian dialect, which he spoke natively.

Karadžić was, along with Đuro Daničić, the Serbian signator of the Vienna Literary Agreement in 1850. Encouraged by the Austrian authorities, this agreement laid the foundation for the modern standard literary language shared by Serbs and Croats, varieties of which are used in Serbia, Montenegro, Bosnia and Herzegovina, and Croatia today. Karadžić also translated the New Testament into Serbian, which was published posthumously in 1868. He authored several influential books during the reform process, including Mala prostonarodna slaveno-serbska pesnarica and Pismenica serbskoga jezika (1814), followed by additional works in 1815 and 1818, while the alphabet was still being developed. In his letters from 1815 to 1818, Karadžić occasionally used archaic letters such as Ю, Я, Ы, and Ѳ, though he had already dropped Ѣ by the time of his 1815 songbook. The reformed Serbian Cyrillic alphabet was officially adopted in 1868, four years after his death.

Vuk Karadžić retained the following 24 letters from the Old Church Slavonic script:

А а	Б б	В в	Г г	Д д	Е е	Ж ж	З з
И и	К к	Л л	М м	Н н	О о	П п	Р р
С с	Т т	У у	Ф ф	Х х	Ц ц	Ч ч	Ш ш

He adopted one letter from the Latin alphabet:

Ј ј

He also created or reintroduced five letters to represent specific Serbian phonemes:

Ђ ђ	Љ љ	Њ њ	Ћ ћ	Џ џ

The following archaic letters were removed from use:

Ѥ ѥ (je)	Ѣ ѣ (jat)	І ї (i)	Ѵ ѵ (i)	Оу оу (u)	Ѡ ѡ (o)	Ѧ ѧ (little yus)	Ѫ ѫ (big yus)	Ы ы (yery, hard i)
Ю ю (ju)	Ѿ ѿ (ot)	Ѳ ѳ (th)	Ѕ ѕ (dz)	Щ щ (št)	Ѯ ѯ (ks)	Ѱ ѱ (ps)	Ь ь (soft sign)	Я я (ja)

The letter Ъ ъ (hard sign, jer debelo, before Vuk a common silent letter that was used mainly at the end of word after consonants) was conserved by Vuk for rare cases where a syllabic r precedes or follows a vowel, e. g. умръо, гръоце, заързати, поървати, заърђати. However, as it did not represent a phoneme, Stojan Novaković introduced the diaeresis over ⟨р⟩ instead. Spelling with the apostrophe, e. g. умр'о, was also in use. Nowadays, the syllabic character of r before or after vowels is not reflected in writing (the modern standard spelling is just умро, зарзати), but the diaeresis is occasionally used for linguistic purposes.

=== Vuk's Cyrillic in Bosnia and Herzegovina and Montenegro ===
In 1860s, Vuk's reformed Cyrillic entered usage among Muslims in Bosnia (then under Ottoman rule). In the same decade it started being regularly used in Montenegro as well.

=== Austria-Hungary ===
Orders issued on 3 and 13 October 1914 prohibited the use of the Serbian Cyrillic alphabet in the Kingdom of Croatia-Slavonia, restricting its use solely to religious instruction. A decree issued on 3 January 1915 extended the ban to all public use of Serbian Cyrillic. Furthermore, an imperial order dated 25 October 1915 banned the use of Serbian Cyrillic in the Condominium of Bosnia and Herzegovina, with the sole exception of usage "within the scope of Serbian Orthodox Church authorities."

=== World War II ===
In 1941, the Independent State of Croatia, a puppet state established by Nazi Germany, banned the use of the Serbian Cyrillic alphabet. The use of Cyrillic had already been restricted by regulations issued on 25 April 1941. In June 1941, the regime began purging so-called "Eastern" (i.e. Serbian) words from the Croatian language and closed Serbian schools. Islamic Amin al-Husseini, who was made chief architect of the Nazi German Genocide of Serbs and offensive in Bosnia, had Serbian Cyrillic banned and persecuted. In 1944, Milka Balvanlieva-Đorđević and Blaže Koneski advocated for the adoption of Serbian Cyrillic for the Macedonian language, however most members of the Commission for the Establishment of the Macedonian Language, Alphabet and Orthography advocated for a distinct Macedonian alphabet.

=== After Yugoslavia ===
Following the breakup of Yugoslavia in the 1990s, Serbian Cyrillic ceased to be used at the national level in Croatia. However, it has remained an official script in Serbia, Bosnia and Herzegovina, and Montenegro.

According to the Constitution of Serbia adopted in 2006, the Cyrillic script is defined as the sole official script for use in government and official communication.

In 2013 in Croatia there were massive protests against official Cyrillic signs on local government buildings in Vukovar.

== Special letters ==
The following typographical ligatures were developed specifically for the Serbian Cyrillic alphabet:

Ђ ђ	Љ љ	Њ њ	Ћ ћ	Џ џ

- Vuk Stefanović Karadžić based the letters Љ and Њ on earlier designs by Serbian linguist, grammarian, and philologist Sava Mrkalj, who attempted to reform the Serbian language before Karadžić. These letters were created by combining Л (L) and Н (N) with the soft sign (Ь).
- The letter Џ was derived by Karadžić from the letter "Gea" used in older forms of the Serbian Cyrillic alphabet.
- Ћ was introduced by Karadžić to represent the voiceless alveolo-palatal affricate (IPA: /t͡ɕ/). It was based on, though visually distinct from, the Glagolitic letter Djerv, which had historically represented various palatalized consonants such as /ɡʲ/, /dʲ/, and /d͡ʑ/.
- The letter Ђ was designed by Serbian poet, prose writer, polyglot, and Orthodox bishop Lukijan Mušicki. Karadžić adopted this design, which was based on his own earlier modification of Ћ.
- The letter Ј was borrowed from the Latin alphabet, likely chosen by Karadžić in preference to the similar-looking Й used in other Cyrillic alphabets.

== Descendant scripts ==
Vuk's Serbian Cyrillic alphabet has been the model for a few other Cyrillic scripts:

- Macedonian alphabet, made official in 1945
- Montenegrin alphabet, made official in 2009
- Drahomanivka, a proposed reformed version of Ukrainian alphabet from 1870s

== Differences from other Cyrillic alphabets ==
Alternate variants of lowercase Cyrillic letters: Б/б, Д/д, Г/г, И/и, П/п, Т/т, Ш/ш. Default Russian (Eastern) forms on the left. Alternate Bulgarian (Western) upright forms in the middle. Alternate Serbian (Southern) italic forms on the right.

Serbian Cyrillic differs from other Slavic Cyrillic alphabets by omitting several letters. It does not use the hard sign (ъ) or soft sign (ь), due to the absence of a phonemic distinction between iotated and non-iotated consonants. Instead, it employs unique letters that historically arose as ligatures. It also lacks letters such as Russian/Belarusian Э, Ukrainian/Belarusian І, the semivowels Й and Ў, and the iotated vowels Я (ya), Є (ye), Ї (yi), Ё (yo), and Ю (yu). These sounds are instead represented using digraphs with Ј, as in Ја, Је, Ји, Јо, Ју. The letter Ј also functions as a semivowel, replacing Й. The letter Щ is not used in Serbian; when necessary, it is transliterated as ШЧ, ШЋ, or ШТ.

Serbian italic and cursive forms of certain lowercase Cyrillic letters—б, г, д, п, т—differ significantly from their counterparts in Russian and other Cyrillic scripts. In the Serbian Cyrillic script, these letters take on distinct shapes: б, г, д, п, т. However, their upright (non-italic) forms are generally standardized across languages, with no officially recognized national variants.

This poses challenges in Unicode rendering, as the italic variants are the only ones that differ, and Unicode assigns the same code points regardless of visual style. Professional Serbian typography addresses this through dedicated fonts, but most texts displayed on consumer devices use East Slavic (e.g., Russian) glyphs even when Serbian language codes are applied. Some modern font families—such as those developed by Adobe, Microsoft (from Windows Vista onward), and others—support Serbian-specific Cyrillic shapes in both regular and italic styles.

When supported by the font and rendering engine, correct glyphs can be displayed by marking text with appropriate language codes. For example:

- <span lang="sr">бгдпт</span> produces Serbian forms: бгдпт
- <span lang="ru">бгдпт</span> produces Russian forms: бгдпт

In italic:

- <span lang="sr" style="font-style: italic">бгдпт</span> produces: бгдпт
- <span lang="ru" style="font-style: italic">бгдпт</span> produces: бгдпт

Since Unicode does not distinguish between these national glyph variants at the character level, font and language-tag support is required to render the correct form.

== Keyboard layout ==
The standard Serbian keyboard layout for personal computers is as follows:

== Polling ==
Several polls have been conducted regarding the preferred writing script in Serbia. Polls ask respondents to identify the script they tend to use more.

Latin is predominant in online spaces, while official documentation favours the Cyrillic script.Citizens use both scripts equally well, which is a result of the school system. Before 2006. the introduction of Cyrillic as the sole official script , the Latin script was predominantly used, and the use of Cyrillic was considered endangered. Today's distribution is subject to change, given that surveys vary.

Year	Pollster	Result		
Year	Pollster	Cyrilic	Latin	Both
2002		21.9%	39.8%	38.3%
2011		35%	35%	25%
2014	Politika	36.2%	47.3%	16%
2018		63%	18%	18%

== Gallery ==
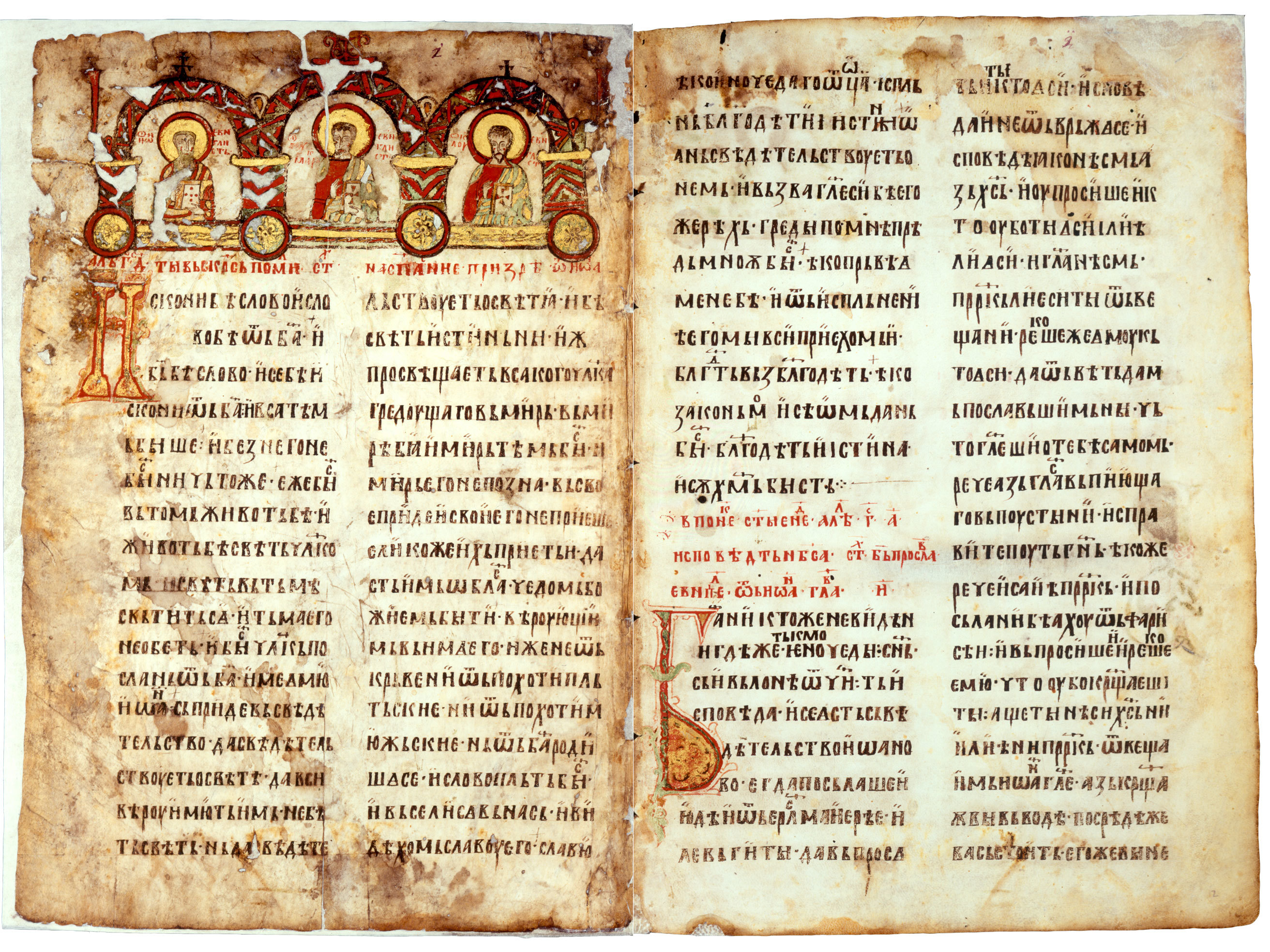
Miroslav Gospels, 1180

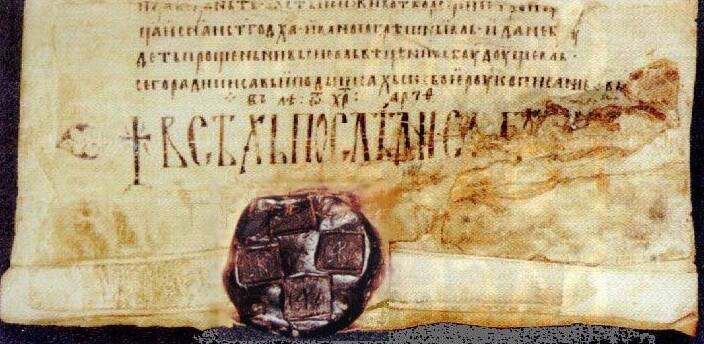
Karyes Typikon, 1199

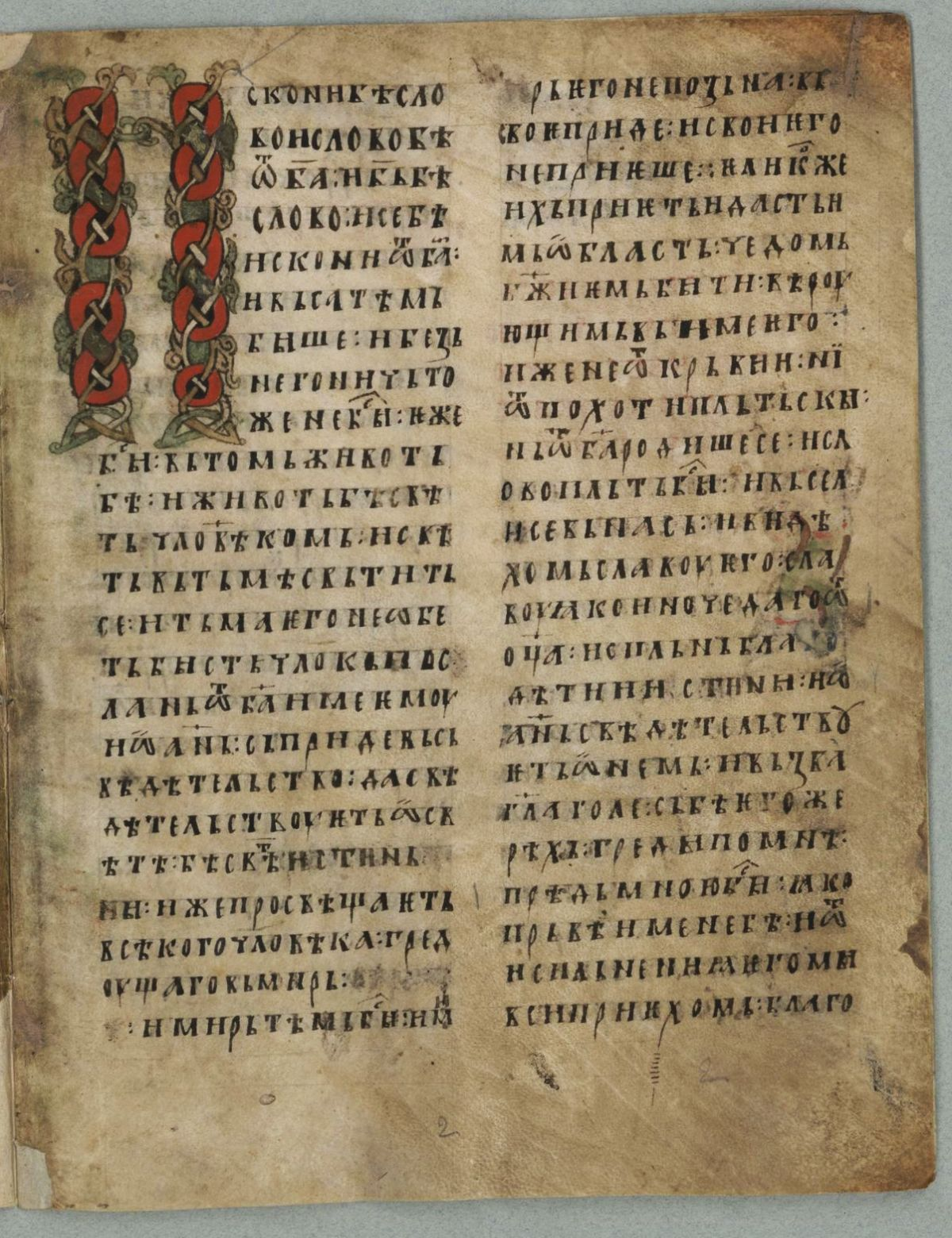
Vukan Codex, 1200

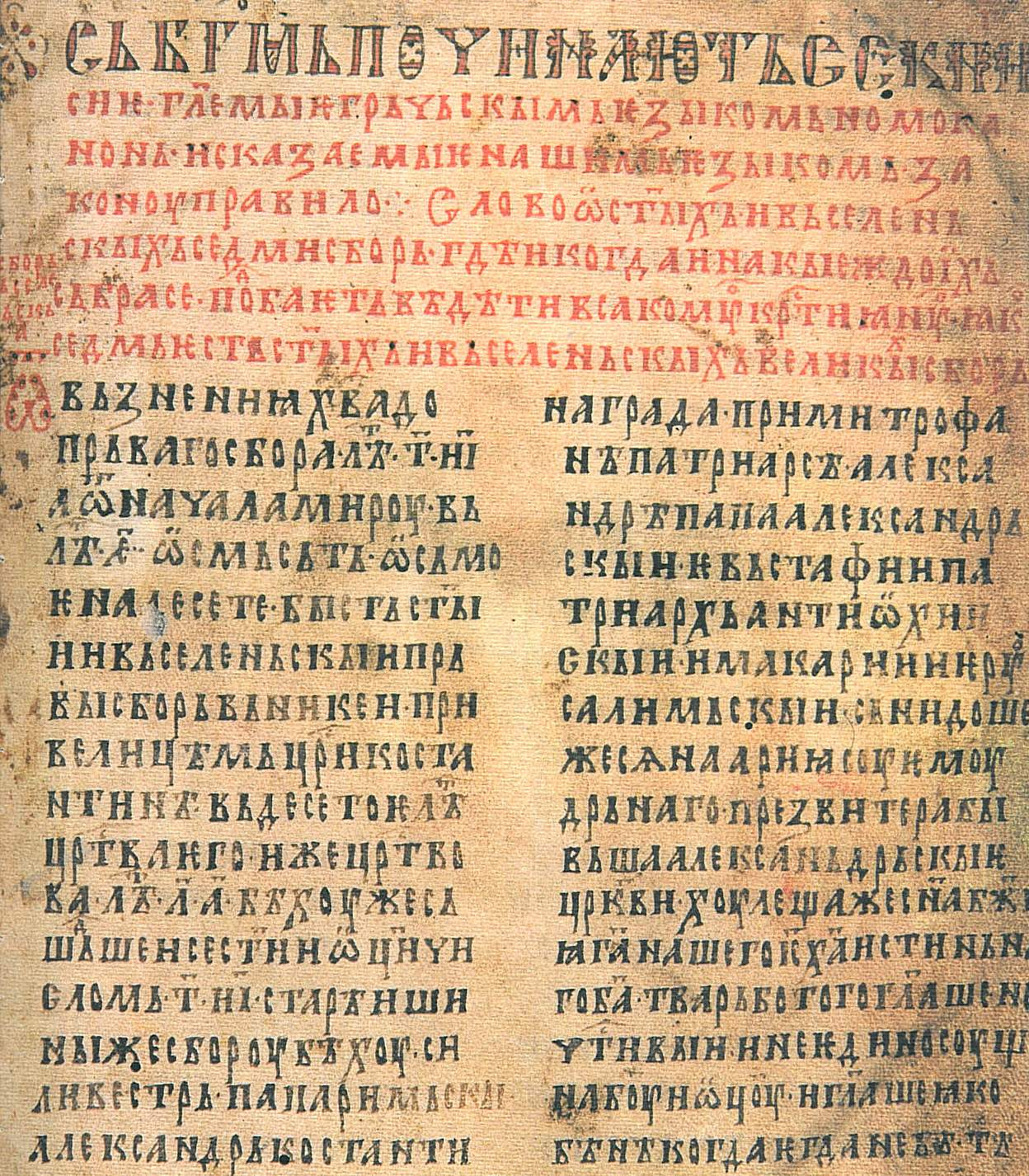
Zakonopravilo, 1219

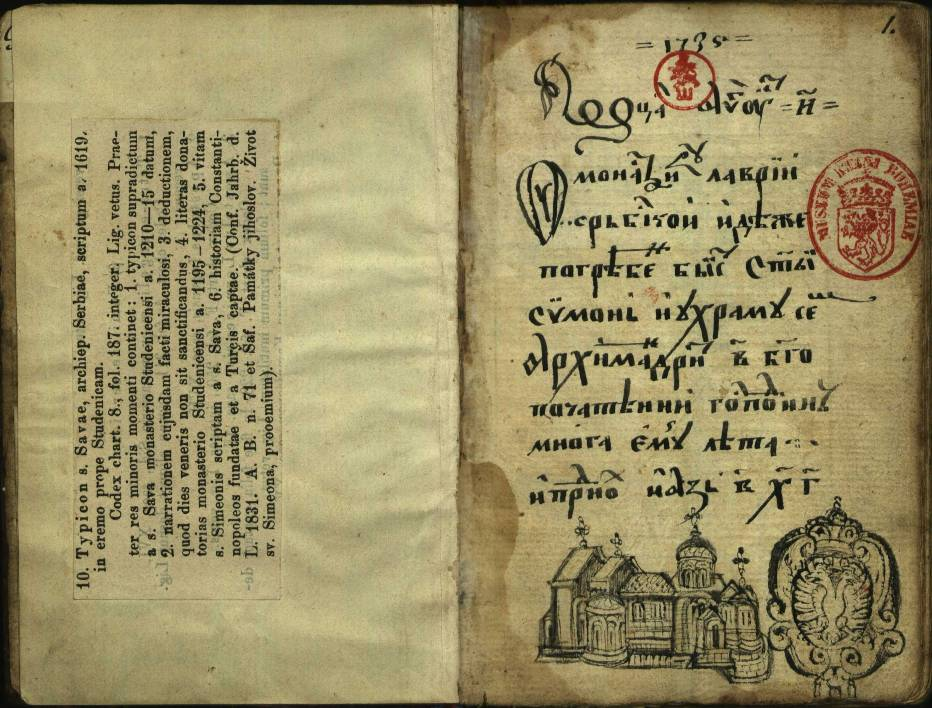
Studenica Typikon, 1208

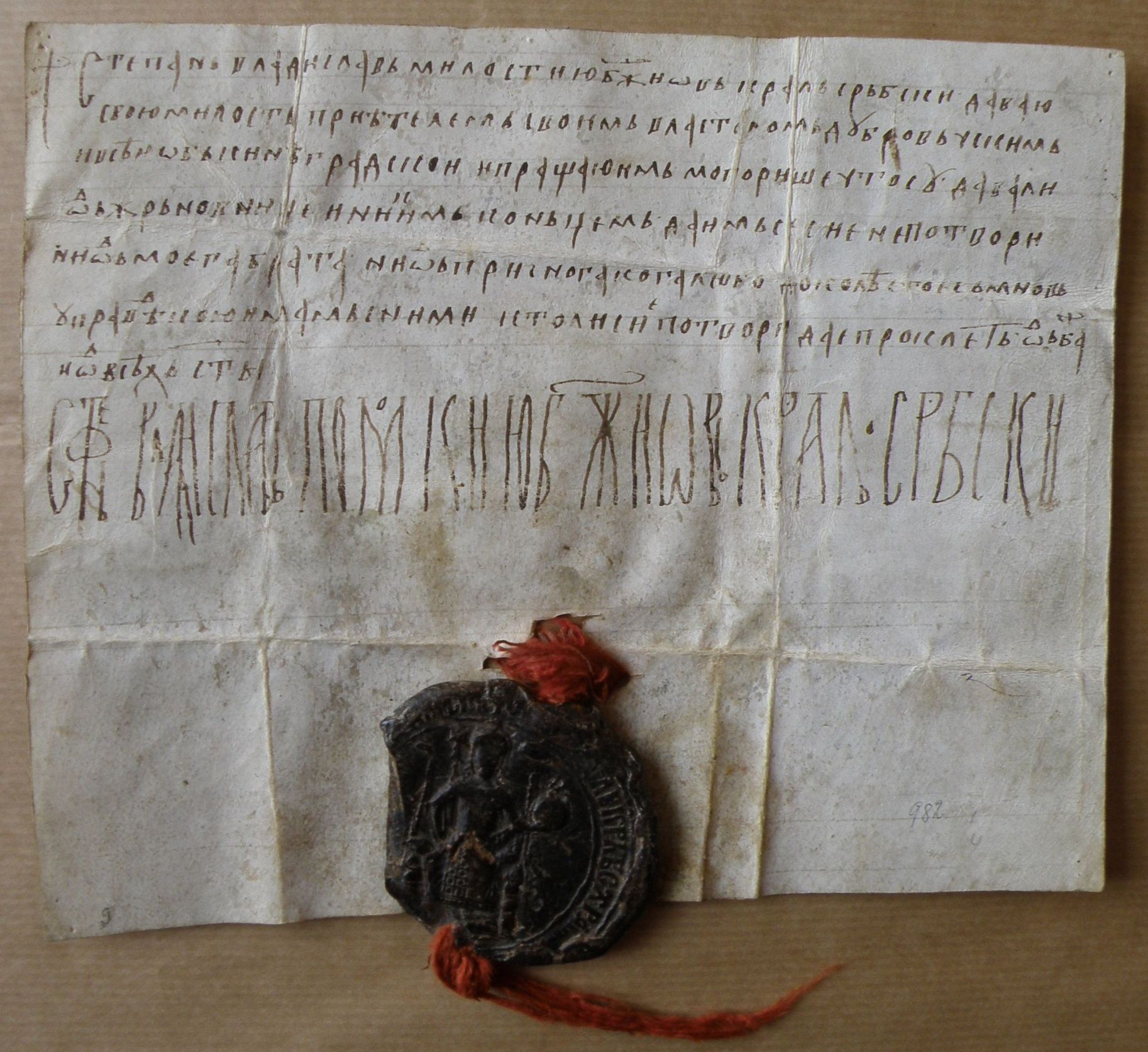
King of Serbia Stefan Vladislav charter, 13th century

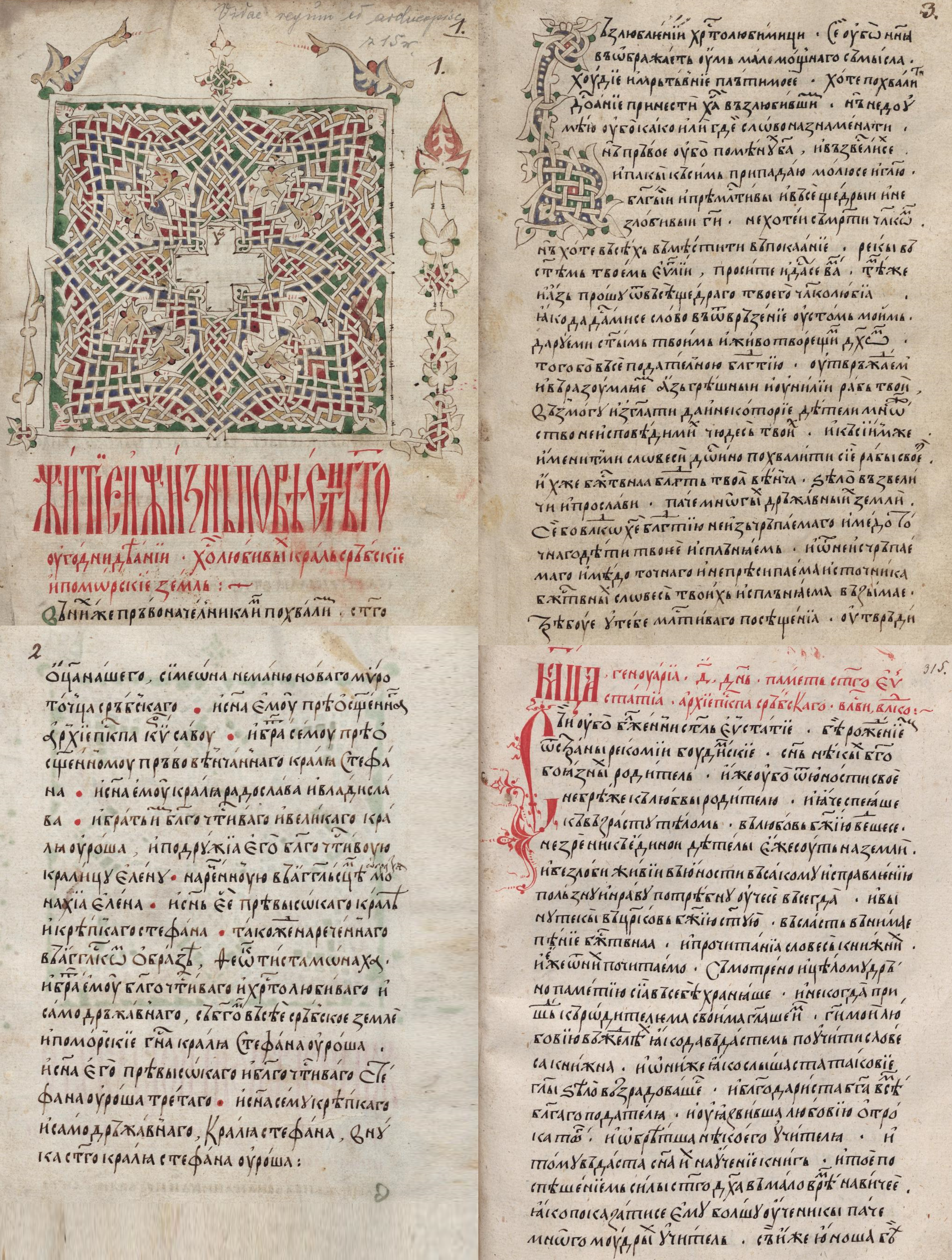
Lives of Serbian Kings and Archbishops, 1337

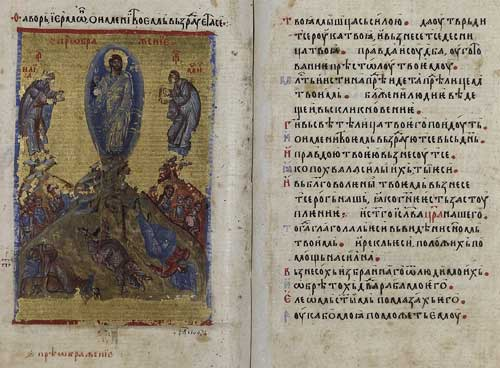
Munich Serbian Psalter 14th century

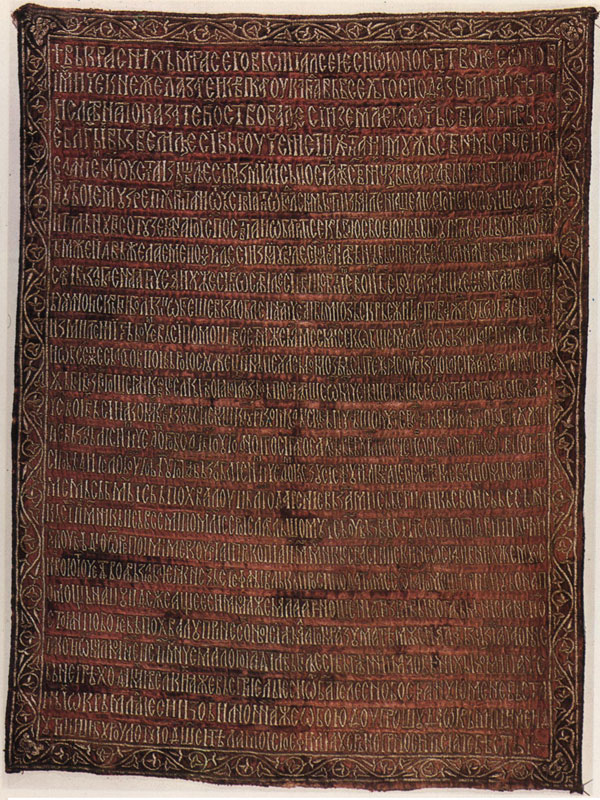
Praise of King Lazar of Serbia by Jefimija, 14th century

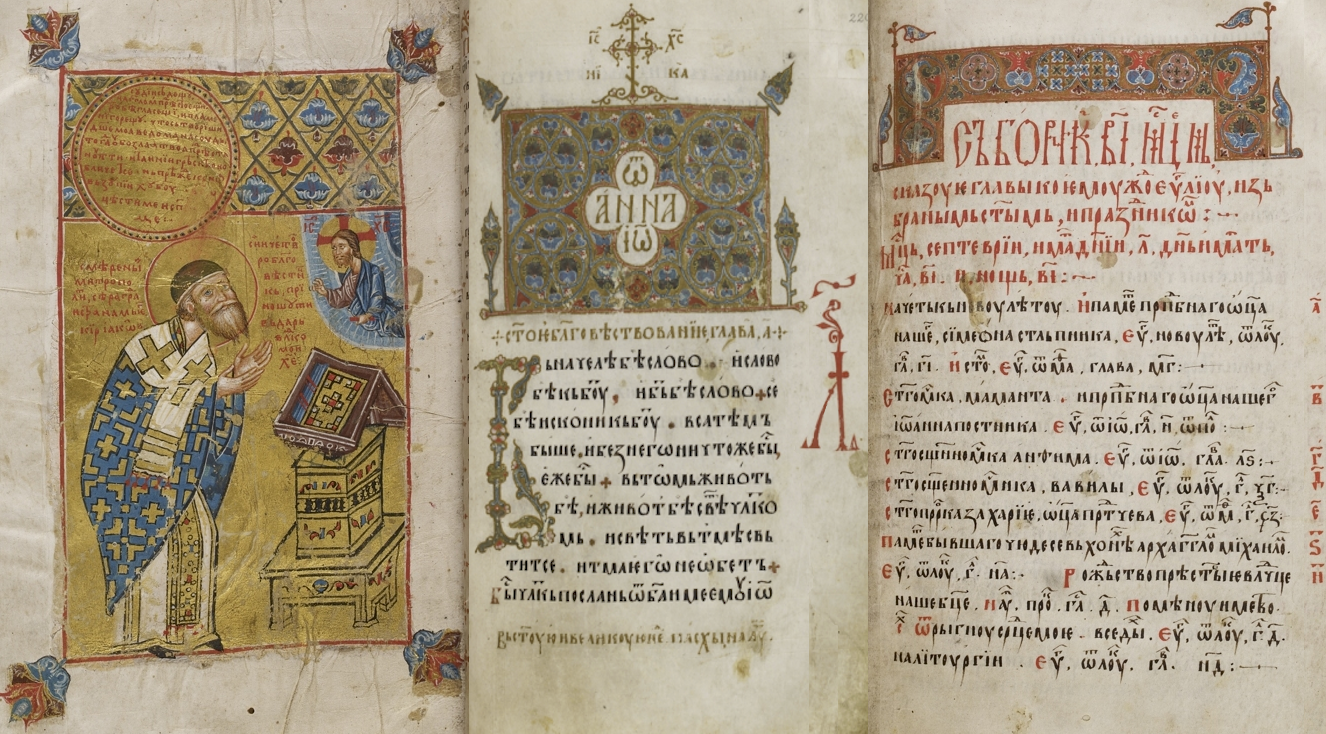
Nikola Stanjević Gospel, 14th century

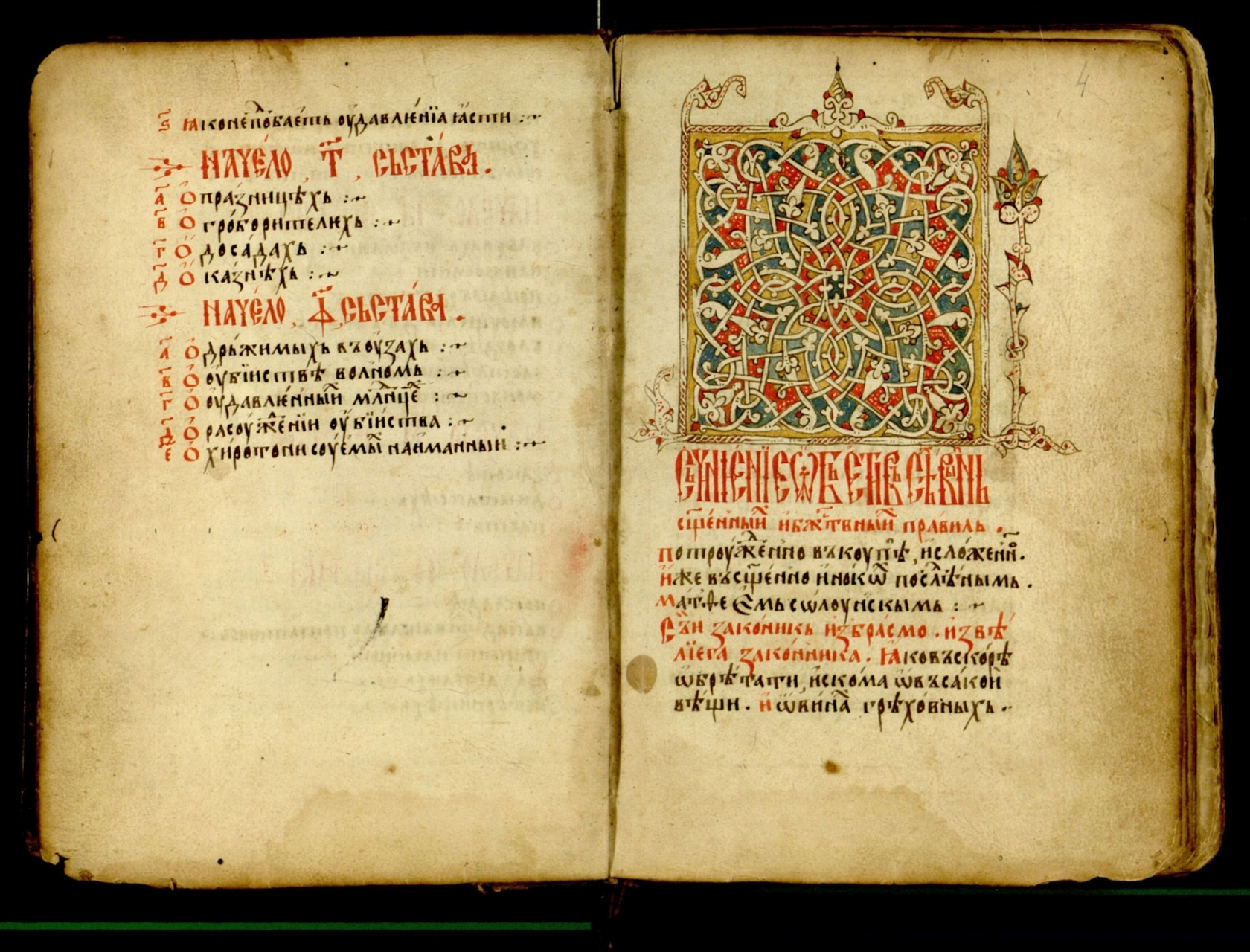
Dušan's Code, 15th century

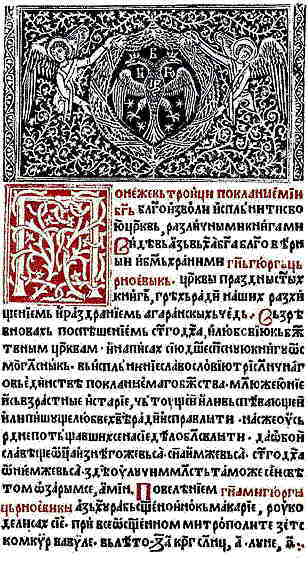
Cetinje Octoechos, 1494

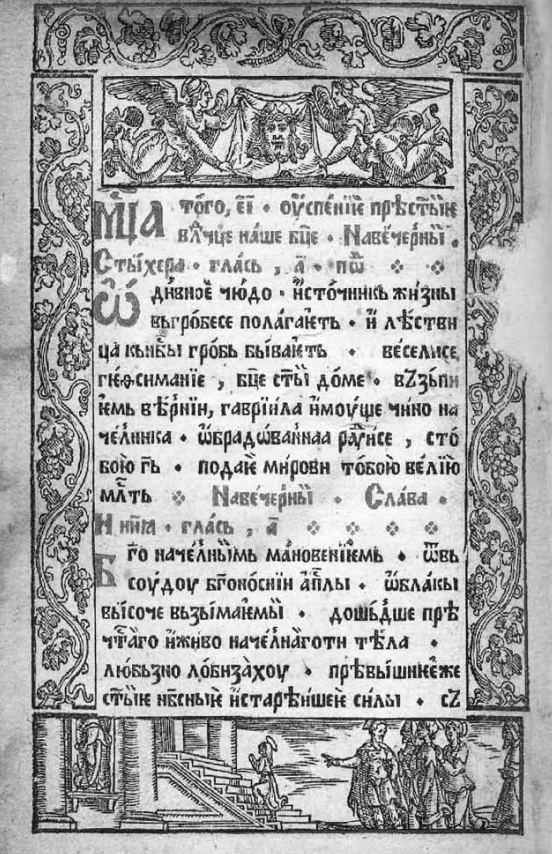
Vicenzo Vukovic printing house, 1547

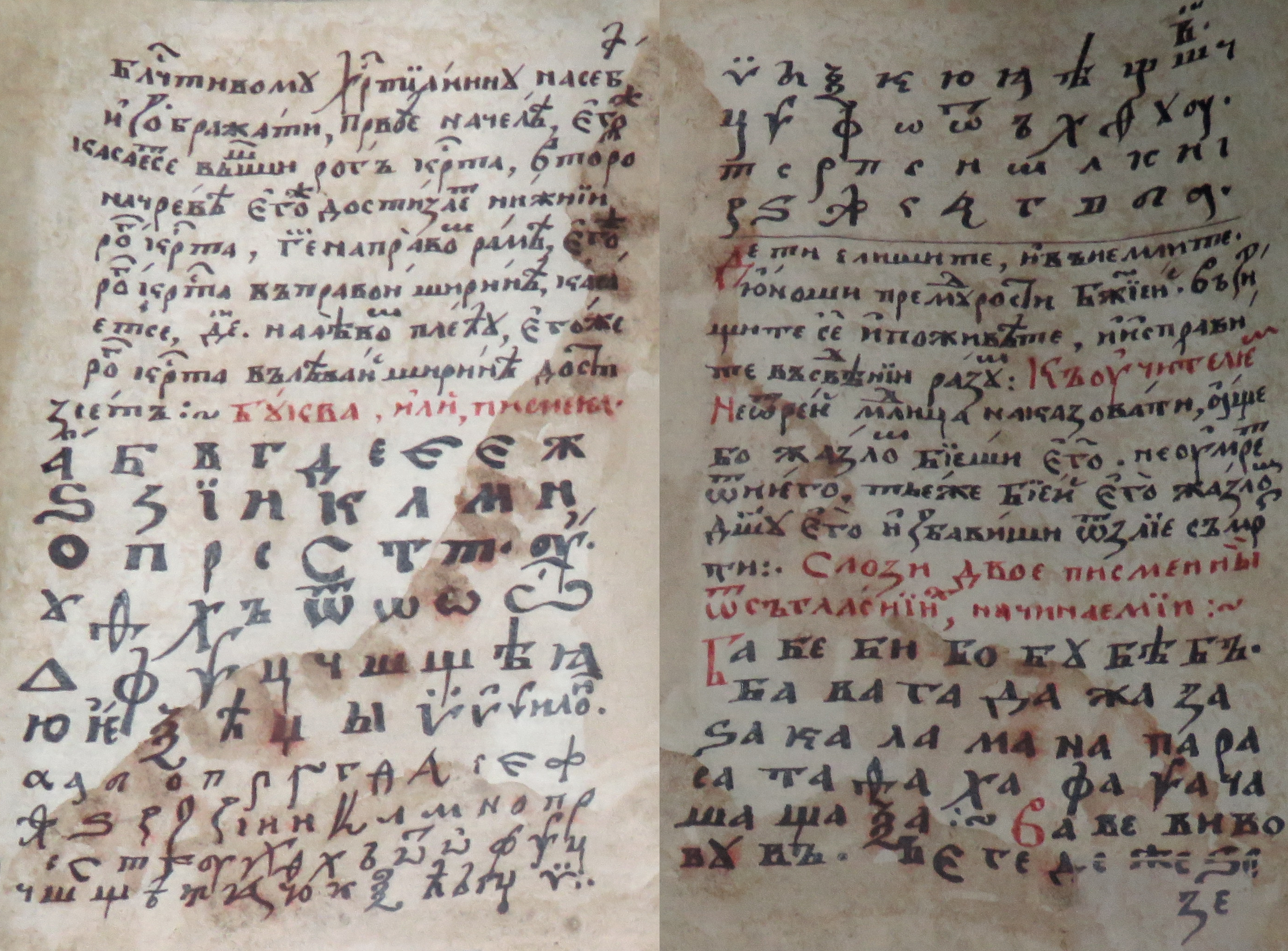
Venclović Serbian Alphabet, 18th century

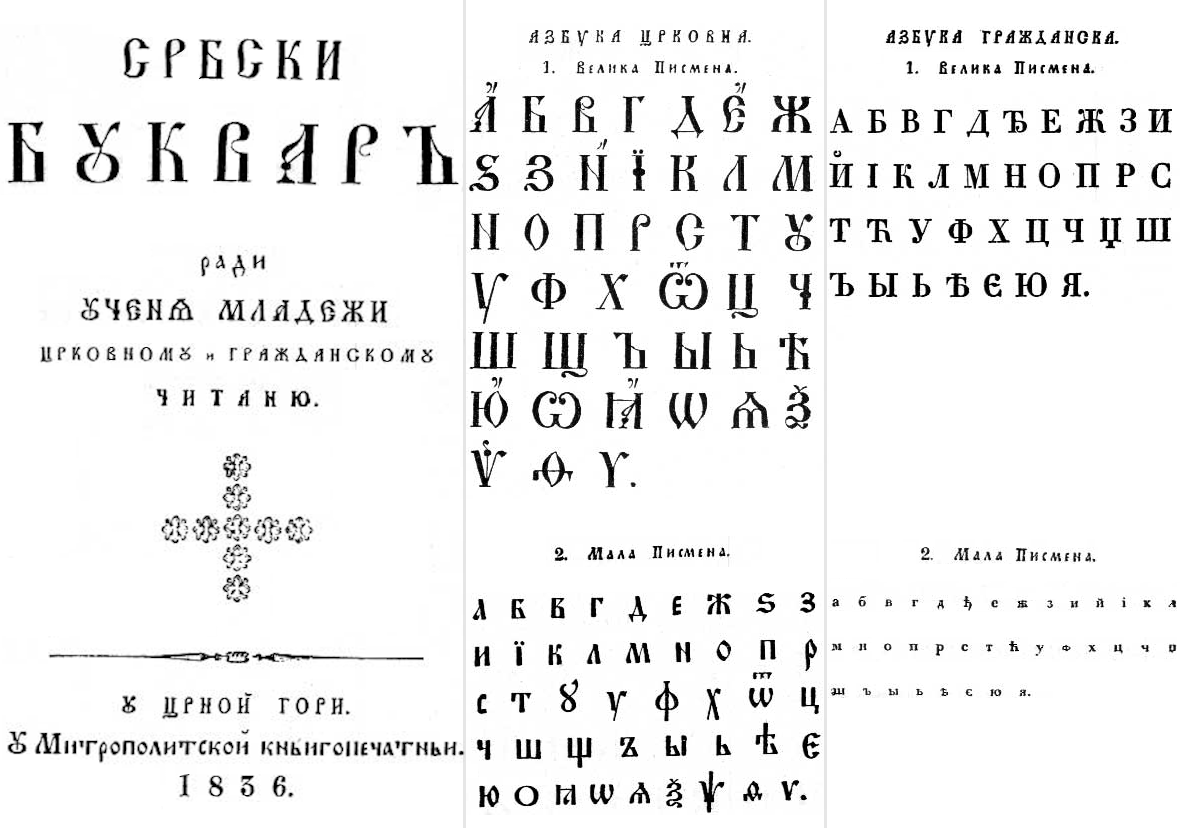
Serbian Cyrillic Alphabet Script before and after reform by Montenegro public church school, Cetinje, 1836

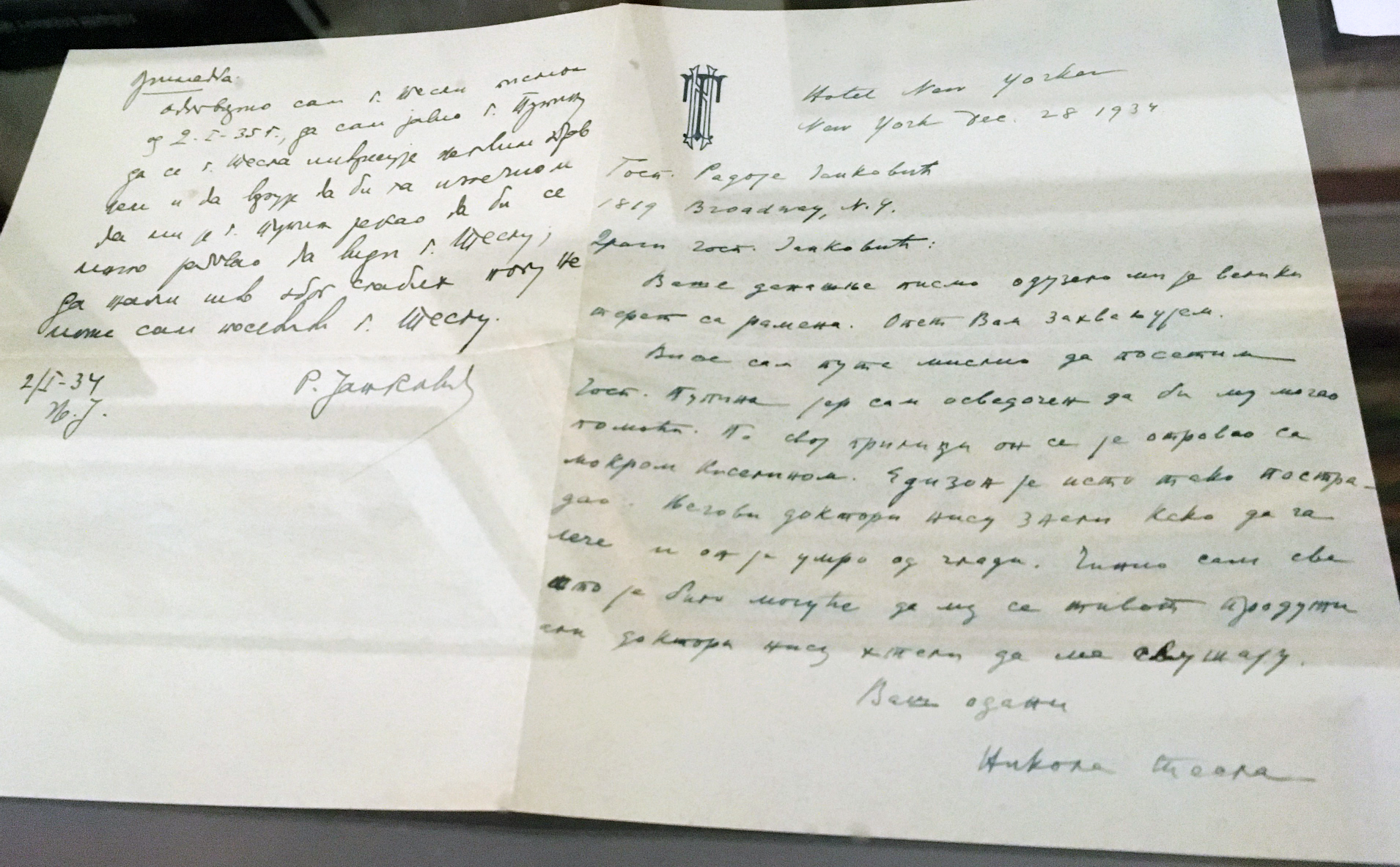
Nikola Tesla letter, 20th century

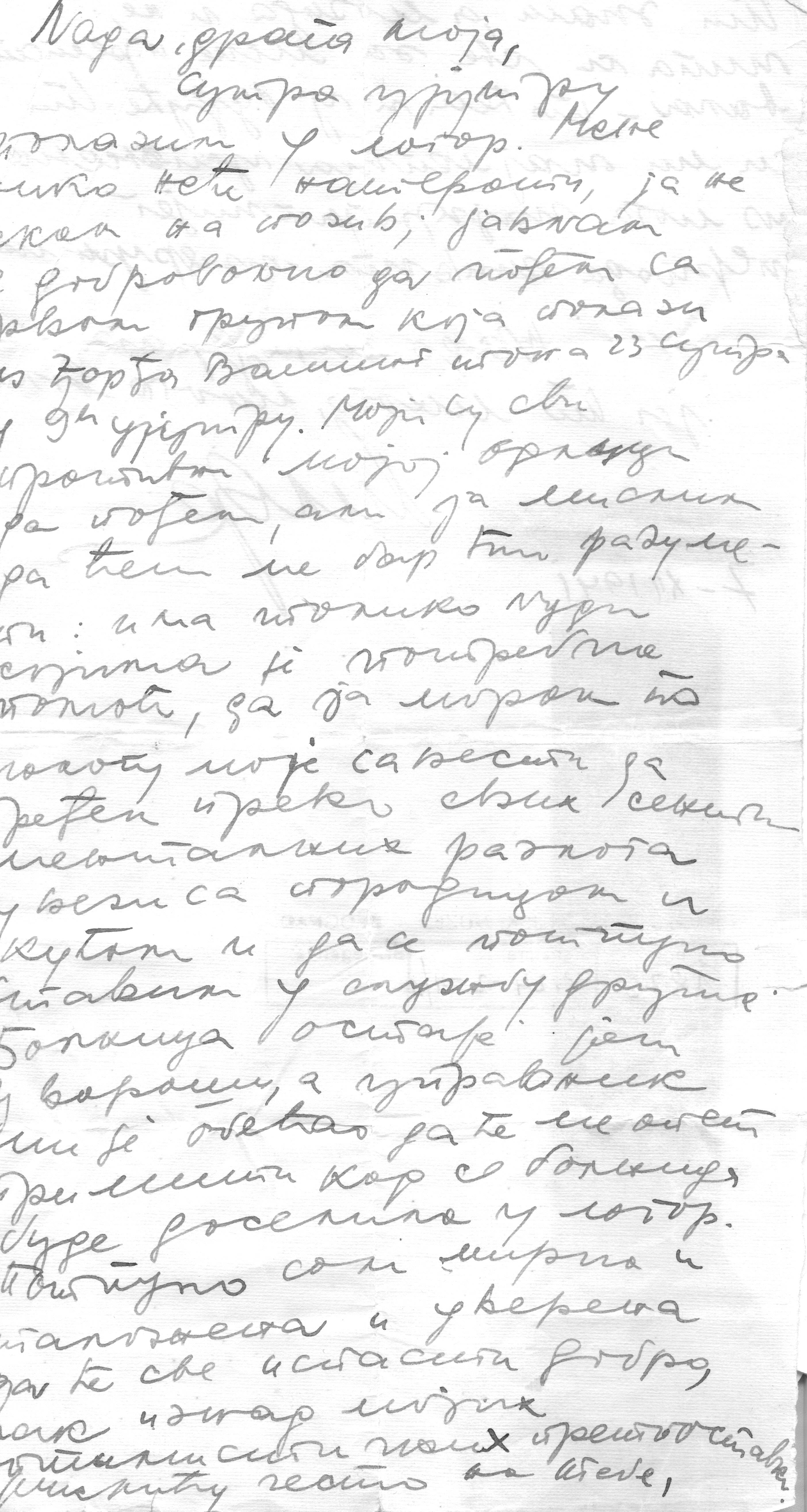
Letter by Hilda Dajč, 1941

== See also ==
- Yugoslav Braille
- Yugoslav manual alphabet
- Serbian calligraphy
