= Serbian calligraphy =

Form of calligraphy based on the Cyrillic script

Serbian calligraphy (Serbian: краснопис/krasnopis, калиграфија/kaligrafija) is a form of calligraphy based on the Cyrillic script used to write the Serbian language. The most notable calligraphers are Zaharije Orfelin (1720–1785), Hristofor Žefarović (d. 1753), and Ivan Boldižar (1917–1986).

== List of calligraphers ==
- Jovan the Serb of Kratovo (1526–1583), priest and scribe
- Zaharije Orfelin (1720–1785), polymath
- Hristofor Žefarović (d. 1753), polymath
- Ivan Boldižar (1917–1986)
- Vladislav Stanković
- Zoran Ilić, painter

== See also ==
- Vyaz (Cyrillic calligraphy)
- First Belgrade Gymnasium
