= Zje =

Letter of the Cyrillic alphabet

- З́ з́

Usage
- Type: alphabetic
- Language of origin: Montenegrin language
- Sound values: [ʑ]

Zje (З́ з́; italics: З́ з́) is a letter of the Cyrillic script, formed from the Cyrillic Ze (З з З з) with the addition of an acute accent. It is used in the Montenegrin alphabet. It represents the voiced alveolo-palatal fricative /ʑ/. It corresponds to the Latin Ź.

== Origins ==
One of the first observations of the sound /ʑ/ in Montenegrin, was made by Vuk Karadžić in 1818, in his article "Srpski rječnik istolkovan njemačkim i latinskim riječima" in which he notes that Herzegovians (a cultural region which stretches over Montenegro, thus presumably he also referred to Montenegrins considering he notes words such as iźeo, which are present in Montenegro but not in Herzegovina): "Ercegovci, kašto izgovaraju s pred j kao Poljsko ś, a z kao ź, n. p. sjekira, sjutra, izjeo..." First instance of usage of the accented Cyrillic letter з́ was in 1926. by Danilo Vušović. It came into official use in mid-2009, with the adoption of the Law on the Official Language in Montenegro.

The letter originates from rural areas in Montenegro.

== Computing codes ==
Being a relatively recent letter, not present in any legacy 8-bit Cyrillic encoding, the letter З́ is not represented directly by a precomposed character in Unicode either; it has to be composed as З+◌́ (U+0301).

Character information
Preview	З		з		́	
Unicode name	CYRILLIC CAPITAL LETTER ZE		CYRILLIC SMALL LETTER ZE		COMBINING ACUTE ACCENT	
Encodings	decimal	hex	dec	hex	dec	hex
Unicode	1047	U+0417	1079	U+0437	769	U+0301
UTF-8	208 151	D0 97	208 183	D0 B7	204 129	CC 81
Numeric character reference	&#1047;	&#x417;	&#1079;	&#x437;	&#769;	&#x301;
Named character reference	&Zcy;		&zcy;			

== See also ==
- Ź ź : Latin letter Ź
- Ž ž : Latin letter Ž
- С́ с́ : Cyrillic letter Sje
- Ԅ ԅ : Komi Zje
- Cyrillic characters in Unicode
