= Ś =

Latin letter S with acute accent

S with acute
- Ś ś

Usage
- Writing system: Latin script
- Type: Alphabetic
- Language of origin: Belarusian language (Latin), Lower Sorbian language, Polish language, Montenegrin language, Silesian language, Ukrainian language (Latin)
- Sound values: [ʃ]; [ɕ]; [sʲ]; [z]; [ɬ]
- In Unicode: U+015A, U+015B, U+017F + U+0301

History
Development
Aa32M40
        - Σ σ ς
          - ς
            - 𐌔
              - S
                - S s ſ
                  - Ś ś
- Transliterations: С́; ش; שׂ; ሠ; श

Ś (minuscule: ś or ſ́) is a letter of the Latin alphabet, formed from S with the addition of an acute accent. It is used in Silesian, Polish, and Montenegrin alphabets, and in certain other languages or romanizations.

== Uses ==
- Slavic languages – usually the palatalized form of /s/

- Polish language – [ɕ] (voiceless alveolo-palatal fricative)
- Montenegrin language – [ɕ]; Cyrillic letter: С́
- In the Belarusian Łacinka for сь /sʲ/
- In the Ukrainian Latynka for сь /sʲ/
- Lower Sorbian language – [ɕ]

- Indo-Aryan: [ʃ] voiceless postalveolar fricative or [ɕ] voiceless alveolo-palatal fricative

- Transliteration of Sanskrit and modern Indic languages: see the International Alphabet of Sanskrit Transliteration
- Romani alphabet

- Ladin language – word-initial [z] (in Anpezo dialect it represents [z] in all positions)
- In some dialects of the Emilian language – /z/
- transliteration of a palatalized s in the Lydian language
- In Proto-Semitic, a reconstructed voiceless lateral fricative phoneme /ɬ/, the parent phoneme of Ge'ez Śawt ሠ.
- a sibilant phoneme of the earliest phase of the Sumerian language.
- transliteration of a letter of the Etruscan alphabet, related to San and Tsade.
- a sibilant phoneme of the ancient Iberian language.

== Encodings ==
Character information
| Preview | Ś | | ś | | ſ | | ́ | |
|---|---|---|---|---|---|---|---|---|
| Unicode name | LATIN CAPITAL LETTER S WITH ACUTE | | LATIN SMALL LETTER S WITH ACUTE | | LATIN SMALL LETTER LONG S | | COMBINING ACUTE ACCENT | |
| Encodings | decimal | hex | dec | hex | dec | hex | dec | hex |
| Unicode | 346 | U+015A | 347 | U+015B | 383 | U+017F | 769 | U+0301 |
| UTF-8 | 197 154 | C5 9A | 197 155 | C5 9B | 197 191 | C5 BF | 204 129 | CC 81 |
| Numeric character reference | &#346; | &#x15A; | &#347; | &#x15B; | &#383; | &#x17F; | &#769; | &#x301; |
| Named character reference | &Sacute; | | &sacute; | | | | | |

The HTML codes are:

- &#346; for Ś (upper case)
- &#347; for ś (lower case)

The Unicode codepoints are U+015A for Ś and U+015B for ś.

== See also ==
- С́
- Cz (digraph)
- Ź
