= Ź =

Latin letter Z with acute accent

Z with acute
- Ź ź

Usage
- Writing system: Latin script
- Type: alphabetic
- Language of origin: Brahui language, Lower Sorbian language, Polish language, Romani language, Serbo-Croatian language, Silesian language
- Sound values: [ʑ]; [zʲ]; [ð]; [ðz]; [dz]
- In Unicode: U+0179, U+017A

History
- Development: Z z: Ź ź

Other
- Writing direction: Left-to-right

Ź (minuscule: ź) is a letter of the Latin alphabet, formed from Z with the addition of an acute accent. The letter appears in Polish, Montenegrin, Silesian, Lower Sorbian, Upper Sorbian, Emiliano-Romagnolo, Wymysorys and Brahui, as well as in the Belarusian Latin alphabet, Ukrainian Latin alphabet and romanized Pashto.

== Usage ==
In Polish, the letter represents the voiced alveolo-palatal fricative ([ʑ]) sound. It is 31st letter of the Polish alphabet. Its names in the language are: ziet and z z kreską. The letter also appears in the digraph dź, which is pronounced as voiced alveolo-palatal affricate ([d͡ʑ]) sound.

In the Latin alphabet of Montenegrin, it represents the voiced alveolo-palatal fricative ([ʑ]) sound, and corresponds with the letter zje (majuscule: З́, minuscule: з́) from the Cyrillic script. It is the 32nd, and the last letter of the alphabet.

In the Belarusian (Łacinka) and Ukrainian (Latynka) Latin alphabet, it represents the /zʲ/ sound and corresponds to зь from the Cyrillic script.

In Lower Sorbian, it represents the voiced alveolo-palatal fricative ([ʑ]) sound. In the Lower and Upper Sorbian, it appears also in the form of digraph dź, which is pronounced as voiced alveolo-palatal affricate ([d͡ʑ]) sound. In Upper Sorbian, the digraph is the only appearance of the letter.

In the romanization of Pashto, It is used, together with digraph dz, to represent the letter źim (ځ). It represents the voiced alveolar affricate ([d͡z]) sound.

In the Emiliano-Romagnolo alphabet, it is used to represent the voiced dental fricative ([ð]) sound. Depending on the various dialects, the pronunciation can be [ðz], or, under Italian influence, [dz], but the most common pronunciation is [ð].

Additionally, it is used in the Venedic language, a constructed language made by Jan van Steenbergen for the alternate history project Ill Bethisad. In the language, the letter represents the voiced alveolo-palatal fricative ([ʑ]) sound. The letter also appears in the digraph dź, which is pronounced as voiced alveolo-palatal affricate ([d͡ʑ]) sound.

== Encodings ==
The HTML codes are:

- &#377; for Ź (upper case)
- &#378; for ź (lower case)

== See also ==
- З́
- Ž
- dz (digraph)
- Ś
- ѣ
