= Źim =

Twelfth letter of Pashto alphabet

- ځ

Usage
- Writing system: Arabic script
- Type: Abjad
- Language of origin: Pashto
- Sound values: Pashto: [d͡z] / [z]
- In Unicode: U+0681 ځ ARABIC LETTER HAH WITH HAMZA ABOVE

Other
- Writing direction: Right-to-left

Dzim, Źim, Dze, or Źe (ځ) is a Pashto letter representing the sibilant affricative (IPA: /dz/) sound. In size and shape, it is a ḥāʾ with a hamza above. It is written in several ways depending on its position in the word:

Position in word:	Isolated	Final	Medial	Initial
Glyph form: (Help)	ځ	ـځ	ـځـ	ځـ
