= Vyaz (Cyrillic calligraphy) =

Type of ancient decorative Cyrillic lettering

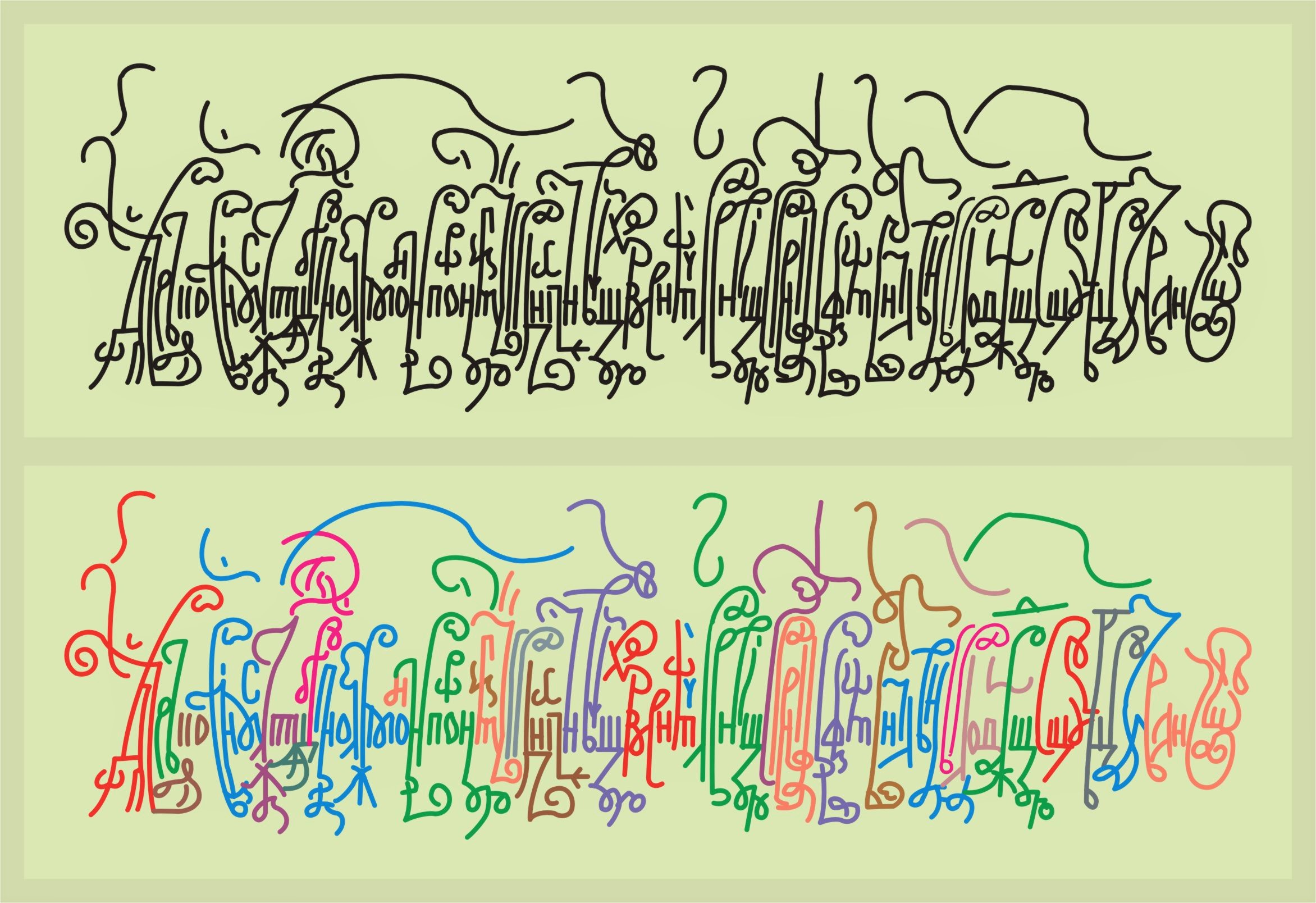
Vyaz of the prayer 'It is truly meet to bless you,' with the individual words distinguished by different colours

Vyaz (Russian: вязь from вязать, vyazat'; Church Slavonic: вѩзати ⰲⱗⰸⰰⱅⰻ 'to bind, to tie') is a type of ancient decorative Cyrillic lettering, in which letters are linked into a continuous ornament.

Russian Vyaz

== History ==
Vyaz first emerged out of a need to write quickly in an aesthetically pleasing manner. Scribes developed vyaz to decorate their texts and highlight the first line of a text. Vyaz headings are sometimes difficult to read due to their ornamentation.

Vyaz first appeared in South Slavic monuments in the 13th century, and was also used from the end of the 14th to the beginning of the 15th century in the East Slavic and Wallachian regions. Under the reign of Ivan the Terrible, vyaz developed considerably, but was later abandoned.

== See also ==
- Serbian calligraphy
- Cyrillic alphabet
