= Dje =

Cyrillic letter used in Serbian and Montenegrin

- Ђ ђ

Usage
- Writing system: Cyrillic
- Type: Alphabetic
- Language of origin: Serbo-Croatian
- Sound values: /d͡ʑ/

History
- Development: Ꙉ ꙉ: Ћ ћ; Ђ ђ
- Transliterations: Đ đ, Ď ď, Dj dj

Dje (Ђ ђ; italics: Ђ ђ) is a letter of the Cyrillic script.

Dje is the sixth letter of the Serbian Cyrillic alphabet and Montenegrin Cyrillic alphabet, used in Serbo-Croatian to represent the voiced alveolo-palatal affricate /d͡ʑ/.

Dje corresponds to the Latin letter D with stroke (Đ đ) in Gaj's Latin alphabet of Serbo-Croatian and is so transliterated. When strokes are unavailable, it is transliterated as ⟨Dj dj⟩ or ⟨Ď ď⟩.

== History ==
Dje was constructed by request of Vuk Stefanović Karadžić. There were several proposed shapes of the letter (one by Pavle Solarić, another by Gligorije Geršić). The variant now in use was designed by Lukijan Mušicki; it was designed by modification of the letter Ћ, itself a revival of the old Cyrillic letter Djerv (Ꙉ). The new letter was adopted in Karadžić's 1818 dictionary and thus entered widespread usage. There was also a Д and Ь ligature variant that has not been added in Unicode as a character, and was used before Dje took its current form.

== Related letters and other similar characters ==
- Ћ ћ: Cyrillic letter Tshe
- Ѓ ѓ: Cyrillic letter Gje
- Đ đ: Latin letter D with stroke
- Ď ď: Latin letter D with caron
- J j: Latin letter J
- Ꙉ ꙉ: Old Cyrillic letter Djerv
- Ԃ ԃ: Cyrillic letter Komi Dje

== Computing codes ==
Character information
Preview	Ђ		ђ	
Unicode name	CYRILLIC CAPITAL LETTER DJE		CYRILLIC SMALL LETTER DJE	
Encodings	decimal	hex	dec	hex
Unicode	1026	U+0402	1106	U+0452
UTF-8	208 130	D0 82	209 146	D1 92
Numeric character reference	&#1026;	&#x402;	&#1106;	&#x452;
Named character reference	&DJcy;		&djcy;	
Code page 855	129	81	128	80
Windows-1251	128	80	144	90
ISO-8859-5	162	A2	242	F2
Macintosh Cyrillic	171	AB	172	AC
