= Tshe =

Cyrillic letter

Tshe (Tje)
- Ћ ћ

Usage
- Writing system: Cyrillic
- Type: Alphabetic
- Language of origin: Serbian, Montenegrin
- Sound values: /t͡ɕ/

History
- Development: Ꙉ ꙉ: Ћ ћ
- Descendants: Ђ ђ

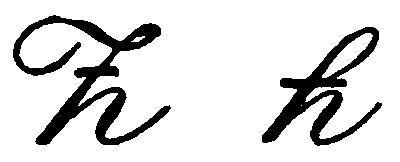
Handwritten cursive forms of Tshe

Tshe (or Tje) (Ћ ћ; italics: Ћ ћ) is a letter of the Cyrillic script, used in the Serbian Cyrillic alphabet and Montenegrin Cyrillic alphabet, where it represents the voiceless alveolo-palatal affricate /tɕ/, somewhat like the pronunciation of ⟨ch⟩ in "chew"; however, it must not be confused with the letter Che (Ч ч), which represents the voiceless retroflex affricate /ʈ͡ʂ/ and also exists in Serbian Cyrillic script. The sound of Tshe is produced from the voiceless alveolar plosive /t/ by iotation. Tshe is the 23rd letter in the Serbian alphabet and 25th letter in the Montenegrin alphabet. It was first used by Dositej Obradović as a revival of the old Cyrillic letter Djerv (Ꙉ), and was later adopted in the 1818 Serbian dictionary of Vuk Stefanović Karadžić. The equivalent character to Tshe in Gaj's Latin alphabet is Ć.

Despite being a Cyrillic letter, Tshe was also used in Latin-based Slovincian phonetic transcriptions with the same value as in Serbian.

Being part of the most common Serbian last names, the transliteration of Tshe to the Latin alphabet is very important; however, there are many ways to transliterate it. It is typically transliterated as ⟨ć⟩, as per the Serbo-Croatian Latin alphabet or, without the diacritic, as ⟨c⟩; less frequent transliterations are ⟨tj⟩, ⟨tsh⟩, ⟨ty⟩, ⟨cj⟩, ⟨cy⟩, ⟨ch⟩ (also used for Che), and ⟨tch⟩, ⟨ts⟩ (the last one in Hungarian only, but ⟨cs⟩ and ⟨ty⟩ are more common). It looks similar to the Shha (Һ һ) but stroked.

As it is one of the letters unique to the Serbian Cyrillic alphabet, and also the first letter of the Serbian word for Cyrillic (ћирилица), Tshe is often used as the basis for logos for various groups involved with the Cyrillic alphabet.

The letter is also used in the Tat and Judeo-Tat alphabets in Azerbaijan.

== Other uses ==
The capital Tshe has seen uses in the English language as a symbol for the definite article The—similarly to the Ampersand & At sign—due to it appearing as a ligature of the Latin script letters uppercase T & lowercase H—which are the first 2 letters of the English word The. However, unlike common symbols such as the ampersand & at sign, the use of the capital Tshe as a symbol in English is not widely known or recognized.

== Related letters and other similar characters ==
- Т т : Cyrillic letter Te
- Ч ч : Cyrillic letter Che
- Ђ ђ : Cyrillic letter Dje
- Һ һ : Cyrillic letter Shha
- Ќ ќ : Cyrillic letter Kje
- Ć ć : Latin letter C with acute
- Ħ ħ : Latin letter H with stroke

== Computing codes ==
Character information
Preview	Ћ		ћ	
Unicode name	CYRILLIC CAPITAL LETTER TSHE		CYRILLIC SMALL LETTER TSHE	
Encodings	decimal	hex	dec	hex
Unicode	1035	U+040B	1115	U+045B
UTF-8	208 139	D0 8B	209 155	D1 9B
Numeric character reference	&#1035;	&#x40B;	&#1115;	&#x45B;
Named character reference	&TSHcy;		&tshcy;	
Code page 855	149	95	148	94
Windows-1251	142	8E	158	9E
ISO-8859-5	171	AB	251	FB
Macintosh Cyrillic	203	CB	204	CC
ENO encoding	1035	000040B	1115	000045B
