= Vyaz (rural locality) =

Vyaz (Russian: Вяз) is the name of several rural localities in Russia:

- Vyaz, Kirov Oblast, a selo in Pasegovsky Rural Okrug of Kirovo-Chepetsky District of Kirov Oblast
- Vyaz, Leningrad Oblast, a village in Tolmachyovskoye Settlement Municipal Formation in Luzhsky District of Leningrad Oblast
- Vyaz, Nizhny Novgorod Oblast, a settlement in Ostankinsky Selsoviet of the town of oblast significance of Bor, Nizhny Novgorod Oblast
- Vyaz, Pskov Oblast, a village in Novosokolnichesky District of Pskov Oblast
