= Vojislav Nikčević =

Montenegrin linguist (1935–2007)

- Born: 18 January 1935; Stubica, Kingdom of Yugoslavia
- Died: 2 July 2007 (aged 72); Belgrade, Serbia
- Education: University of Zagreb
- Occupation: academic
- Known for: Institute for Montenegrin Language and Philology

Vojislav Nikčević (Cyrillic: Војислав Никчевић; 18 January 1935 – 2 July 2007) was a Montenegrin linguist.

== Life ==
Nikčević was born in Stubica village near Nikšić, Kingdom of Yugoslavia, and was educated at the University of Zagreb in Zagreb, Croatia. He was a professor at the Philological Faculty of Nikšić, University of Montenegro.

He was best known for his work on promoting the Montenegrin language as a separate language from Serbian. He was a prominent member of the Doclean Academy of Sciences and Arts and was director of the Institute for Montenegrin Language and Philology.

After his death on July 2, 2007 in Belgrade he was buried in Cetinje.
