= Diacritic =

Modifier mark added to a letter

Latin letter A with multiple diacritics

A diacritic (also diacritical mark, diacritical point, diacritical sign, accent, or accent mark) is a glyph added to a letter or to a basic glyph. The term derives from the Ancient Greek διακριτικός (diakritikós, "distinguishing"), from διακρίνω (diakrínō, "to distinguish"). The word diacritic is a noun, though it is sometimes used in an attributive sense, whereas diacritical is only an adjective. Some diacritics, such as the acute ⟨ó⟩, grave ⟨ò⟩, and circumflex ⟨ô⟩ (all shown above an 'o'), are often called accents. Diacritics may appear above or below a letter or in some other position such as within the letter or between two letters. The main use of diacritics in Latin script is to change the sound-values of the letters to which they are added.

Historically, English has used the diaeresis diacritic to indicate the correct pronunciation of ambiguous words, such as "coöperate", without which the <oo> letter sequence could be misinterpreted to be pronounced /ˈkuːpəreɪt/. Other examples are the acute and grave accents, which can indicate that a vowel is to be pronounced differently from what is normal in that position, for example not reduced to /ə/ or silent as in the case of the two uses of the letter e in the noun résumé (as opposed to the verb resume) and the help sometimes provided in the pronunciation of some words such as doggèd, learnèd, blessèd, and especially words pronounced differently than normal in poetry (for example movèd, breathèd).

Most other words with diacritics in English are borrowings from languages such as French to better preserve the spelling, such as the diaeresis on naïve and Noël, the acute from café, the circumflex in the word crêpe, and the cedille in façade. All these diacritics, however, are frequently omitted in writing, and English is the only major modern European language that does not have diacritics in common usage. (Note: The New Yorker is reported as being unique in its continuing usage of them.)

In Latin-script alphabets in other languages, diacritics may distinguish between homonyms, such as the French là ("there") versus la ("the"), which are both pronounced /la/. In Gaelic type, a dot over a consonant indicates lenition of the consonant in question.

In other writing systems, diacritics may perform other functions. Vowel pointing systems, namely the Arabic harakat and the Hebrew niqqud systems, indicate vowels that are not conveyed by the basic alphabet. The Indic virama ( ् etc.) and the Arabic sukūn ( ـْـ ) mark the absence of vowels. Cantillation marks indicate prosody. Other uses include the Early Cyrillic titlo stroke ( ◌҃ ) and the Hebrew gershayim ( ״ ), which, respectively, mark abbreviations or acronyms, and Greek diacritical marks, which showed that letters of the alphabet were being used as numerals. In Vietnamese and the Pinyin romanization system for Mandarin Chinese, diacritics are used to mark the tones of the syllables in which the marked vowels occur.

In orthography and collation, a letter modified by a diacritic may be treated either as a new, distinct letter or as a letter–diacritic combination. This varies from language to language and may vary from case to case within a language.

In some cases, letters are used as "in-line diacritics", with the same function as ancillary glyphs, in that they modify the sound of the letter preceding them, as in the case of the "h" in the English pronunciation of "sh" and "th". Such letter combinations are sometimes even collated as a single distinct letter. For example, the spelling "sch" was traditionally treated as a separate letter in German; words with that spelling were listed after all other words spelled with s in card catalogs in public libraries in Vienna, for example.

== Types ==
Among the types of diacritic used in alphabets based on the Latin script are:

- accents (so called because the acute, grave, and circumflex were originally used to indicate different types of pitch accents in the polytonic transcription of Greek)
  - ◌́ – acute (Latin: apex); for example ó
  - ◌̀ – grave; for example ò
  - ◌̂ – circumflex; for example ô
  - ◌̌ – caron, wedge; for example ǒ
  - ◌̋ – double acute; for example ő
  - ◌̏ – double grave; for example ȍ
- one dot
  - ◌̇ – an overdot is used in many orthographies and transcriptions; for example ȯ
  - ◌̣ – an underdot is also used in many orthographies and transcriptions; for example ọ
  - ◌·◌ – an interpunct is used in the Catalan ela geminada (l·l)
  - ◌͘ – a dot above right is used in Pe̍h-ōe-jī
  - tittle, the superscript dot of the modern lowercase Latin ⟨i⟩ and ⟨j⟩
- two dots:
  - two overdots (◌̈) are used for umlaut, diaeresis and others; (for example ö)
  - two underdots (◌̤) are used in the International Phonetic Alphabet (IPA) and the ALA-LC romanization system
  - ◌ː – triangular colon, used in the IPA to mark long vowels (the "dots" are triangular, not circular).
- curves
  - ◌̆ – breve; for example ŏ
  - ◌̑ – inverted breve; for example ȏ
  - ◌͗ – sicilicus, a palaeographic diacritic similar to a caron or breve
  - ◌̃ – tilde; for example õ
  - ◌҃ – titlo
- vertical stroke
  - ◌̩ – a subscript vertical stroke is used in IPA to mark syllabicity and in Rheinische Dokumenta to mark a schwa
  - ◌̍ – a superscript vertical stroke is used in Pe̍h-ōe-jī
- macron or horizontal line
  - ◌̄ – macron; for example ō
  - ◌̱ – underbar
- overlays
  - ◌⃓ – vertical bar through the character
  - ◌̷ – slash through the character; for example ø
  - ◌̵ – crossbar through the character
- ring
  - ◌̊ – overring: for example å
- superscript curls
  - ◌̓ – comma above
  - ◌̒ – inverted apostrophe
  - ◌̔ – reversed comma above
  - ◌̉ – hook above (Vietnamese: dấu hỏi); for example ỏ
  - ◌̛ – horn (Vietnamese: dấu móc); for example ơ
- subscript curls
  - ◌̦ – undercomma; for example ș
  - ◌̧ – cedilla; for example ç
  - ◌̡ ◌̢ – hook, left or right, sometimes superscript
  - ◌̨ – ogonek; for example ǫ
- double marks (over or under two base characters)
  - ◌͝◌ – double breve
  - ◌͡◌ – tie bar or top ligature
  - ◌᷍◌ – double circumflex
  - ◌͞◌ – longum
  - ◌͠◌ – double tilde
- double sub/superscript diacritics
  - ◌̧ ̧ – double cedilla
  - ◌̨ ̨ – double ogonek
  - ◌̈ ̈ – double diaeresis
  - ◌ͅͺ – double ypogegrammeni

The tilde, dot, comma, titlo, apostrophe, bar, and colon are sometimes diacritical marks, but also have other uses.

Not all diacritics occur adjacent to the letter they modify. In the Wali language of Ghana, for example, an apostrophe indicates a change of vowel quality, but occurs at the beginning of the word, as in the dialects ’Bulengee and ’Dolimi. Because of vowel harmony, all vowels in a word are affected, so the scope of the diacritic is the entire word. In abugida scripts, like those used to write Hindi and Thai, diacritics indicate vowels, and may occur above, below, before, after, or around the consonant letter they modify.

The tittle (dot) on the letter ⟨i⟩ or the letter ⟨j⟩, of the Latin alphabet originated as a mark to clearly distinguish ⟨i⟩ from the minims (downstrokes) of adjacent letters. It first appeared in the 11th century in the sequence ii (as in Latin: ingeníí), then spread to every i that was adjacent to an m, n or u, and finally to all lowercase is. The ⟨j⟩, originally a variant of i, inherited the tittle. The shape of the tittle developed from initially resembling the modern acute accent to becoming a long flourish by the 15th century. With the advent of Roman type it was reduced to the round dot that is currently used. In Turkish and nearby languages, the tittle is a genuine diacritic rather than just a clarifying mark: see U+0130 İ LATIN CAPITAL LETTER I WITH DOT ABOVE and U+0131 ı LATIN SMALL LETTER DOTLESS I.

Several languages of eastern Europe use diacritics on both consonants and vowels, whereas in western Europe digraphs are more often used to change consonant sounds. Most languages in Europe use diacritics on vowels, aside from English where there are typically none (with some exceptions).

== Diacritics specific to non-Latin alphabets ==
=== Arabic ===
- (ئ ؤ إ أ and stand alone ء) hamza: indicates a glottal stop.
- (ــًــٍــٌـ) tanwīn (تنوين) symbols: Serve a grammatical role in Arabic. The sign ـً is most commonly written in combination with alif, e.g. ـًا.
- (ــّـ) shadda: Gemination (doubling) of consonants.
- (ٱ) waṣla: Comes most commonly at the beginning of a word. Indicates a type of hamza that is pronounced only when the letter is read at the beginning of the talk.
- (آ) madda: A written replacement for a hamza that is followed by an alif, i.e. (ءا). Read as a glottal stop followed by a long /aː/, e.g. ءاداب، ءاية، قرءان، مرءاة are written out respectively as آداب، آية، قرآن، مرآة. This writing rule does not apply when the alif that follows a hamza is not a part of the stem of the word, e.g. نتوءات is not written out as نتوآت as the stem نتوء does not have an alif that follows its hamza.
- (ــٰـ) superscript alif (also "short" or "dagger alif": A replacement for an original alif that is dropped in the writing out of some rare words, e.g. لاكن is not written out with the original alif found in the word pronunciation, instead it is written out as لٰكن.
- ḥarakāt (In Arabic: حركات also called تشكيل tashkīl):
  - (ــَـ) fatḥa (a)
  - (ــِـ) kasra (i)
  - (ــُـ) ḍamma (u)
  - (ــْـ) sukūn (no vowel)
- The ḥarakāt or vowel points serve two purposes:
  - They serve as a phonetic guide. They indicate the presence of short vowels (fatḥa, kasra, or ḍamma) or their absence (sukūn).
  - At the last letter of a word, the vowel point reflects the inflection case or conjugation mood.
    - For nouns, The ḍamma is for the nominative, fatḥa for the accusative, and kasra for the genitive.
    - For verbs, the ḍamma is for the imperfective, fatḥa for the perfective, and the sukūn is for verbs in the imperative or jussive moods.
- Vowel points or tashkīl should not be confused with consonant points or iʿjam (إعجام) – one, two or three dots written above or below a consonant to distinguish between letters of the same or similar form.

=== Greek ===
These diacritics are used in addition to the acute, grave, and circumflex accents and the diaeresis:

- ◌ͺ – iota subscript (ᾳ, εͅ, ῃ, ιͅ, οͅ, υͅ, ῳ)
- ῾◌ – rough breathing (Ancient Greek: δασὺ πνεῦμα, romanized: dasỳ pneûma, Latin: spīritus asper): aspiration
- ᾿◌ – smooth (or soft) breathing (Ancient Greek: ψιλὸν πνεῦμα, romanized: psilòn pneûma, Latin: spīritus lēnis): lack of aspiration

=== Hebrew ===
Genesis 1:9 "And God said, Let the waters be collected". Letters in black, niqqud in red, cantillation in blue

- Niqqud
  - ּ – Dagesh
  - ּ – Mappiq
  - ֿ – Rafe
  - ׁ – Shin dot (at top right corner)
  - ׂ – Sin dot (at top left corner)
  - ְ – Shva
  - ֻ – Kubutz
  - ֹ◌ – Holam
  - ָ – Kamatz
  - ַ – Patakh
  - ֶ – Segol
  - ֵ – Tzeire
  - ִ – Hiriq

(Cantillation marks do not generally render correctly; refer to Hebrew cantillation#Names and shapes of the ta'amim for a complete table together with instructions for how to maximize the possibility of viewing them in a web browser.)

- Other
  - ׳ – Geresh
  - ״ – Gershayim

=== Korean ===
Hangul, the Korean syllabary

The diacritics 〮 and 〯 , known as Bangjeom (방점; 傍點), were used to mark pitch accents in Hangul for Middle Korean. They were written to the left of a syllable in vertical writing and above a syllable in horizontal writing.

=== Sanskrit and Indic ===
Devanagari scripts (from Brahmic family) compound letters, which are vowels combined with consonants, have diacritics. Here, क (k) is shown with vowel diacritics. That is: ा, ि, े, ु, ौ ़, ः, etc.

=== Syriac ===
- A dot above and a dot below a letter represent [a], transliterated as a or ă,
- Two diagonally-placed dots above a letter represent [ɑ], transliterated as ā or â or å,
- Two horizontally-placed dots below a letter represent [ɛ], transliterated as e or ĕ; often pronounced [ɪ] and transliterated as i in the East Syriac dialect,
- Two diagonally-placed dots below a letter represent [e], transliterated as ē,
- A dot underneath the Beth represent a soft [v] sound, transliterated as v
- A tilde (~) placed under Gamel represent a [dʒ] sound, transliterated as j
- The letter Waw with a dot below it represents [u], transliterated as ū or u,
- The letter Waw with a dot above it represents [o], transliterated as ō or o,
- The letter Yōḏ with a dot beneath it represents [i], transliterated as ī or i,
- A tilde (~) under Kaph represent a [t͡ʃ] sound, transliterated as ch or č,
- A semicircle under Peh represents an [f] sound, transliterated as f or ph.

In addition to the above vowel marks, transliteration of Syriac sometimes includes ə, e̊ or superscript ^{e} (or often nothing at all) to represent an original Aramaic schwa that became lost later on at some point in the development of Syriac. Some transliteration schemes find its inclusion necessary for showing spirantization or for historical reasons.

== Non-alphabetic scripts ==
Some non-alphabetic scripts also employ symbols that function essentially as diacritics.

- Non-pure abjads (such as Hebrew and Arabic script) and abugidas use diacritics for denoting vowels. Hebrew and Arabic also indicate consonant doubling and change with diacritics; Hebrew and Devanagari use them for foreign sounds. Devanagari and related abugidas also use a diacritical mark called a virama to mark the absence of a vowel. In addition, Devanagari uses the moon-dot chandrabindu ( ँ ) for vowel nasalization.
- Unified Canadian Aboriginal Syllabics use several types of diacritics, including the diacritics with alphabetic properties known as Medials and Finals. Although long vowels originally were indicated with a negative line through the Syllabic glyphs, making the glyph appear broken, in the modern forms, a dot above is used to indicate vowel length. In some of the styles, a ring above indicates a long vowel with a [j] off-glide. Another diacritic, the "inner ring" is placed at the glyph's head to modify [p] to [f] and [t] to [θ]. Medials such as the "w-dot" placed next to the Syllabics glyph indicates a [w] being placed between the syllable onset consonant and the nucleus vowel. Finals indicate the syllable coda consonant; some of the syllable coda consonants in word medial positions, such as with the "h-tick", indicate the fortification of the consonant in the syllable following it.
- The Japanese hiragana and katakana syllabaries use the dakuten (◌゛) and handakuten (◌゜) (in Japanese: 濁点 and 半濁点) symbols, also known as nigori (濁 "muddying") or ten-ten (点々 "dot dot") and maru (丸 "circle"), to indicate voiced consonants or other phonetic changes.
- Emoticons are commonly created with diacritic symbols, especially Japanese emoticons on popular imageboards.

== Alphabetization or collation ==
Different languages use different rules to put diacritic characters in alphabetical order. For example, French and Portuguese treat letters with diacritical marks the same as the underlying letter for purposes of ordering and dictionaries. The Scandinavian languages and the Finnish language, by contrast, treat the characters with diacritics ⟨å⟩, ⟨ä⟩, and ⟨ö⟩ as distinct letters of the alphabet, and sort them after ⟨z⟩. Usually ⟨ä⟩ (a-umlaut) and ⟨ö⟩ (o-umlaut) [used in Swedish and Finnish] are sorted as equivalent to ⟨æ⟩ (ash) and ⟨ø⟩ (o-slash) [used in Danish and Norwegian]. Also, aa, when used as an alternative spelling to ⟨å⟩, is sorted as such. Other letters modified by diacritics are treated as variants of the underlying letter, with the exception that ⟨ü⟩ is frequently sorted as ⟨y⟩.

Languages that treat accented letters as variants of the underlying letter usually alphabetize words with such symbols immediately after similar unmarked words. For instance, in German where two words differ only by an umlaut, the word without it is sorted first in German dictionaries (e.g. schon and then schön, or fallen and then fällen). However, when names are concerned (e.g. in phone books or in author catalogues in libraries), umlauts are often treated as combinations of the vowel with a suffixed ⟨e⟩; Austrian phone books now treat characters with umlauts as separate letters (immediately following the underlying vowel).

In Spanish, the grapheme ⟨ñ⟩ is considered a distinct letter, different from ⟨n⟩ and collated between ⟨n⟩ and ⟨o⟩, as it denotes a different sound from that of a plain ⟨n⟩. But the accented vowels ⟨á⟩, ⟨é⟩, ⟨í⟩, ⟨ó⟩, ⟨ú⟩ are not separated from the unaccented vowels ⟨a⟩, ⟨e⟩, ⟨i⟩, ⟨o⟩, ⟨u⟩, as the acute accent in Spanish only modifies stress within the word or denotes a distinction between homonyms, and does not modify the sound of a letter.

For a comprehensive list of the collating orders in various languages, see Collating sequence.

== Generation with computers ==
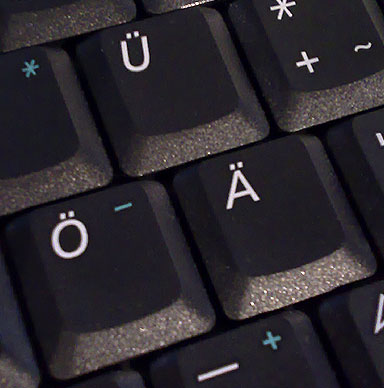
German keyboard with umlaut letters

Modern computer technology was developed mostly in countries that speak Western European languages (particularly English), and many early binary encodings were developed with a bias favoring English—a language written without diacritical marks. With computer memory and computer storage at premium, early character sets were limited to the Latin alphabet, the ten digits and a few punctuation marks and conventional symbols. The American Standard Code for Information Interchange (ASCII), first published in 1963, encoded just 95 printable characters. It included just four free-standing diacritics—acute, grave, circumflex and tilde—which were to be used by backspacing and overprinting the base letter. The ISO/IEC 646 standard (1967) defined national variations that replace some American graphemes with precomposed characters (such as ⟨é⟩, ⟨è⟩ and ⟨ë⟩), according to language—but remained limited to 95 printable characters.

Unicode was conceived to solve this problem by assigning every known character its own code; if this code is known, most modern computer systems provide a method to input it. For historical reasons, almost all the letter-with-accent combinations used in European languages were given unique code points and these are called precomposed characters. For other languages, it is usually necessary to use a combining character diacritic together with the desired base letter. As of 2026, some applications and web browsers still fail to render combining diacritics correctly in certain cases, such as with web fonts that lack precomposed glyphs.

Depending on the keyboard layout and keyboard mapping, it is more or less easy to enter letters with diacritics on computers and typewriters. Keyboards used in countries where letters with diacritics are the norm, have keys engraved with the relevant symbols. In other cases, such as when the US international or UK extended mappings are used, the accented letter is created by first pressing the key with the diacritic mark, followed by the letter to place it on. This method is known as the dead key technique, as it produces no output of its own but modifies the output of the key pressed after it.

== Languages with letters containing diacritics ==
The following languages have letters with diacritics that are orthographically distinct from those without diacritics.

=== Latin script ===
==== Baltic ====
- Latvian has the following letters: ⟨ā⟩, ⟨ē⟩, ⟨ī⟩, ⟨ū⟩, ⟨č⟩, ⟨ģ⟩, ⟨ķ⟩, ⟨ļ⟩, ⟨ņ⟩, ⟨š⟩, ⟨ž⟩
- Lithuanian. In general usage, where letters appear with the caron (⟨č⟩, ⟨š⟩ and ⟨ž⟩), they are considered as separate letters from ⟨c⟩, ⟨s⟩ or ⟨z⟩ and collated separately; letters with the ogonek (⟨ą⟩, ⟨ę⟩, ⟨į⟩ and ⟨ų⟩), the macron (⟨ū⟩) and the overdot (⟨ė⟩) are considered as separate letters as well, but not given a unique collation order.

==== Celtic ====
- Welsh uses the circumflex, diaeresis, acute, and grave accents on its seven vowels ⟨a⟩, ⟨e⟩, ⟨i⟩, ⟨o⟩, ⟨u⟩, ⟨w⟩, ⟨y⟩ (hence the composites ⟨â⟩, ⟨ê⟩, ⟨î⟩, ⟨ô⟩, ⟨û⟩, ⟨ŵ⟩, ⟨ŷ⟩, ⟨ä⟩, ⟨ë⟩, ⟨ï⟩, ⟨ö⟩, ⟨ü⟩, ⟨ẅ⟩, ⟨ÿ⟩, ⟨á⟩, ⟨é⟩, ⟨í⟩, ⟨ó⟩, ⟨ú⟩, ⟨ẃ⟩, ⟨ý⟩, ⟨à⟩, ⟨è⟩, ⟨ì⟩, ⟨ò⟩, ⟨ù⟩, ⟨ẁ⟩, ⟨ỳ⟩). However all except the circumflex (which is used as a macron) are fairly rare.
- Following spelling reforms since the 1970s, Scottish Gaelic uses graves only, which can be used on any vowel (⟨à⟩, ⟨è⟩, ⟨ì⟩, ⟨ò⟩, ⟨ù⟩). Formerly acute accents could be used on ⟨á⟩, ⟨ó⟩ and ⟨é⟩, which were used to indicate a specific vowel quality. With the elimination of these accents, the new orthography relies on the reader having prior knowledge of pronunciation of a given word.
- Manx uses the cedilla diacritic ⟨ç⟩ combined with h to give the digraph ⟨çh⟩ (pronounced /tʃ/) to mark the distinction between it and the digraph ⟨ch⟩ (pronounced /h/ or /x/). Other diacritics used in Manx included the circumflex and diaeresis, as in ⟨â⟩, ⟨ê⟩, ⟨ï⟩, etc. to mark the distinction between two similarly spelled words but with slightly differing pronunciation.
- Irish uses only acute accents to mark long vowels, following the 1948 spelling reform. Lenition is indicated using an overdot in Gaelic type (⟨ċ⟩,⟨ḋ⟩,⟨ḟ⟩, ⟨ġ⟩, ⟨ṁ⟩, ⟨ṗ⟩, ⟨ṡ⟩, ⟨ṫ⟩); in Roman type, a suffixed ⟨h⟩ is used. Thus, a ṁáṫair is equivalent to a mháthair.
- Breton does not have a single orthography (spelling system), but uses diacritics for a number of purposes. The diaeresis is used to mark that two vowels are pronounced separately and not as a diphthong/digraph. The circumflex is used to mark long vowels, but usually only when the vowel length is not predictable by phonology. Nasalization of vowels may be marked with a tilde, or following the vowel with the letter ⟨ñ⟩. The plural suffix -où is used as a unified spelling to represent a suffix with a number of pronunciations in different dialects, and to distinguish this suffix from the digraph ⟨ou⟩ which is pronounced as /u:/. An apostrophe is used to distinguish ⟨c'h⟩, pronounced /x/ as the digraph ⟨ch⟩ is used in other Celtic languages, from the French-influenced digraph ch, pronounced /ʃ/.

==== Finno-Ugric ====
- Estonian has a distinct letter ⟨õ⟩, which contains a tilde. Estonian vowels with double-dot diacritics ⟨ä⟩, ⟨ö⟩, ⟨ü⟩ are similar to German, but these are also distinct letters, unlike German umlauted letters. All four have their own place in the alphabet, between ⟨w⟩ and ⟨x⟩. Carons in ⟨š⟩ or ⟨ž⟩ appear only in foreign proper names and loanwords. Also these are distinct letters, placed in the alphabet between s and t.
- Finnish uses double-dotted vowels (⟨ä⟩ and ⟨ö⟩). As in Swedish and Estonian, these are regarded as individual letters, rather than 'vowel + diacritic' combinations (as happens in German). It also uses the characters ⟨å⟩, ⟨š⟩ and ⟨ž⟩ in foreign names and loanwords. In the Finnish and Swedish alphabets, ⟨å⟩, ⟨ä⟩ and ⟨ö⟩ collate as separate letters after ⟨z⟩, the others as variants of their base letter.
- Hungarian uses the double-dot, the acute and double acute diacritics (the last is unique to Hungarian): (⟨ö⟩, ⟨ü⟩), (⟨á⟩, ⟨é⟩, ⟨í⟩, ⟨ó⟩, ⟨ú⟩) and (⟨ő⟩, ⟨ű⟩). The acute accent indicates the long form of a vowel (in case of ⟨i⟩/⟨í⟩, ⟨o⟩/⟨ó⟩, ⟨u⟩/⟨ú⟩) while the double acute performs the same function for ⟨ö⟩ and ⟨ü⟩. The acute accent can also indicate a different sound (more open, as in case of ⟨a⟩/⟨á⟩, ⟨e⟩/⟨é⟩). Both long and short forms of the vowels are listed separately in the Hungarian alphabet, but members of the pairs ⟨a⟩/⟨á⟩, ⟨e⟩/⟨é⟩, ⟨i⟩/⟨í⟩, ⟨o⟩/⟨ó⟩, ⟨ö⟩/⟨ő⟩, ⟨u⟩/⟨ú⟩ and ⟨ü⟩/⟨ű⟩ are collated in dictionaries as the same letter.
- Karelian has the umlauted vowels ä, ö, but not ü as in Estonian or some orthographies of Veps, instead using y. It also has caron letters š and ž, and sometimes č (although it's replaced with tš in other orthographies).
- Livonian has the following letters: ⟨ā⟩, ⟨ä⟩, ⟨ǟ⟩, ⟨ḑ⟩, ⟨ē⟩, ⟨ī⟩, ⟨ļ⟩, ⟨ņ⟩, ⟨ō⟩, ⟨ȯ⟩, ⟨ȱ⟩, ⟨õ⟩, ⟨ȭ⟩, ⟨ŗ⟩, ⟨š⟩, ⟨ț⟩, ⟨ū⟩, ⟨ž⟩.

==== Germanic ====
- German uses the two-dots diacritic (German: umlaut): letters ⟨ä⟩, ⟨ö⟩, ⟨ü⟩, used to indicate the fronting of back vowels (see umlaut (linguistics)).
- Dutch uses acute, circumflex, grave and two-dots diacritics with most vowels and cedilla with c, as in French. This results in ⟨á⟩, ⟨à⟩, ⟨ä⟩, ⟨é⟩, ⟨è⟩, ⟨ê⟩, ⟨ë⟩, ⟨í⟩, ⟨î⟩, ⟨ï⟩, ⟨ó⟩, ⟨ô⟩, ⟨ö⟩, ⟨ú⟩, ⟨û⟩, ⟨ü⟩ and ⟨ç⟩. This is mostly on words (and names) originating from French (like crème, café, gêne, façade). The acute accent is also used to stress the vowel (like één). The two-dots diacritic is used as a linguistic diaeresis (a vowel hiatus) that splits the two vowels, e.g., reële, reünie, coördinatie), rather than to indicate a linguistic umlaut as used in German.
- Afrikaans uses 16 additional vowel forms, both uppercase and lowercase: ⟨á⟩, ⟨ä⟩, ⟨é⟩, ⟨è⟩, ⟨ê⟩, ⟨ë⟩, ⟨í⟩, ⟨î⟩, ⟨ï⟩, ⟨ó⟩, ⟨ô⟩, ⟨ö⟩, ⟨ú⟩, ⟨û⟩, ⟨ü⟩, ⟨ý⟩.
- Faroese uses acutes and some additional letters. All are considered separate letters and have their own place in the alphabet: ⟨á⟩, ⟨í⟩, ⟨ó⟩, ⟨ú⟩, ⟨ý⟩ and ⟨ø⟩.
- Icelandic uses acutes and other additional letters. All are considered separate letters, and have their own place in the alphabet: ⟨á⟩, ⟨é⟩, ⟨í⟩, ⟨ó⟩, ⟨ú⟩, ⟨ý⟩ and ⟨ö⟩.
- Danish and Norwegian use additional characters like the o-slash ⟨ø⟩ and the a-overring ⟨å⟩. These letters come after ⟨z⟩ and ⟨æ⟩ in the order ⟨ø⟩, ⟨å⟩. Historically, the ⟨å⟩ has developed from a ligature by writing a small superscript ⟨a⟩ over a lowercase ⟨a⟩; if an ⟨å⟩ character is unavailable, some Scandinavian languages allow the substitution of a doubled a, thus ⟨aa⟩. The Scandinavian languages collate these letters after ⟨z⟩, but have different national collation standards.
- Swedish uses a-diaeresis (⟨ä⟩) and o-diaeresis (⟨ö⟩) in the place of ash (⟨æ⟩) and slashed o (⟨ø⟩) in addition to the a-overring (⟨å⟩). Historically, the two-dots diacritic for the Swedish letters ⟨ä⟩ and ⟨ö⟩ developed from a small Gothic ⟨e⟩ written above the letters. These letters are collated after ⟨z⟩, in the order ⟨å⟩, ⟨ä⟩, ⟨ö⟩.

==== Romance ====
- In Asturian, Galician and Spanish, the character ⟨ñ⟩ is a letter and collated between n and o.
- Asturian uses an underdot: ⟨Ḷ⟩ (lower case, ⟨ḷ⟩), and ⟨Ḥ⟩ (lower case ⟨ḥ⟩)
- Catalan uses the acute accent ⟨é⟩, ⟨í⟩, ⟨ó⟩, ⟨ú⟩, the grave accent ⟨à⟩, ⟨è⟩, ⟨ò⟩, the diaeresis ⟨ï⟩, ⟨ü⟩, the cedilla ⟨ç⟩, and the interpunct ⟨l·l⟩.

- In Valencian, the circumflex ⟨â⟩, ⟨ê⟩, ⟨î⟩, ⟨ô⟩, ⟨û⟩ may also be used.

- Corsican uses the following in its alphabet: ⟨À⟩/⟨à⟩, ⟨È⟩/⟨è⟩, ⟨Ì⟩/⟨ì⟩, ⟨Ò⟩/⟨ò⟩, ⟨Ù⟩/⟨ù⟩.
- French uses four diacritics, appearing on vowels (circumflex, acute, grave, diaeresis) and the cedilla appearing in ⟨ç⟩.
- Italian uses two diacritics, appearing on vowels (acute, grave)
- Leonese: could use ⟨ñ⟩ or ⟨nn⟩.
- Portuguese uses a tilde with the vowels ⟨a⟩ and ⟨o⟩ and a cedilla with c.
- Romanian uses a breve on the letter a (⟨ă⟩) to indicate the sound schwa /ə/, as well as a circumflex over the letters a (⟨â⟩) and i (⟨î⟩) for the sound /ɨ/. Romanian also writes a comma below the letters s (⟨ș⟩) and t (⟨ț⟩) to represent the sounds /ʃ/ and /t͡s/, respectively. These characters are collated after their non-diacritic equivalent.
- Spanish uses acute accents (⟨á⟩, ⟨é⟩, ⟨í⟩, ⟨ó⟩, ⟨ú⟩) to indicate stress falling on a different syllable than the one it would fall on based on default rules, and to distinguish certain one-syllable homonyms (e.g. el (masculine singular definite article) and él [he]). The acute accent is also used to break up sequences of vowels that would normally be pronounced as a diphthong into two syllables, as in the word reír. Diaeresis is used on u only, to distinguish the combinations gue, gui /ge/, /gi/ from güe, güi /gwe/, /gwi/, e.g. vergüenza, lingüística. The tilde on ⟨ñ⟩ is not considered a diacritic as ⟨ñ⟩ is considered a distinct letter from ⟨n⟩, not a mutated form of it.

==== Slavic ====
- Gaj's Latin alphabet, used in Croatian and latinized Serbian, has the symbols ⟨č⟩, ⟨ć⟩, ⟨đ⟩, ⟨š⟩ and ⟨ž⟩, which are considered separate letters and are listed as such in dictionaries and other contexts in which words are listed according to alphabetical order. It also has one digraph including a diacritic, dž, which is also alphabetized independently, and follows ⟨d⟩ and precedes ⟨đ⟩ in the alphabetical order.
- The Czech alphabet uses the acute (lowercase á é í ó ú ý, uppercase Á É Í Ó Ú Ý), caron (lowercase č ď ě ň ř š ť ž, uppercase Č Ď Ě Ň Ř Š Ť Ž), and for one letter (lowercase ů, uppercase Ů) the ring. (In ď and ť the caron is modified to look rather like an apostrophe.) Letter with caron are considered separate letters, whereas vowels are considered only as longer variants of the unaccented letters. Acute does not affect alphabetical order, letters with caron are ordered after original counterparts.
- Polish has the following letters: ą ć ę ł ń ó ś ź ż. These are considered to be separate letters: each of them is placed in the alphabet immediately after its Latin counterpart (e.g. ⟨ą⟩ between ⟨a⟩ and ⟨b⟩), ⟨ź⟩ and ⟨ż⟩ are placed after ⟨z⟩ in that order.
- The Serbian Cyrillic alphabet has no diacritics, instead it has a grapheme (glyph) for every letter of its Latin counterpart (including Latin letters with diacritics and the digraphs dž, lj and nj).
- The Slovak alphabet uses the acute (lowercase á é í ó ú ý ĺ ŕ, uppercase Á É Í Ó Ú Ý Ĺ Ŕ), caron (lowercase č ď ľ ň š ť ž dž, uppercase Č Ď Ľ Ň Š Ť Ž DŽ), umlaut (ä Ä) and circumflex accent (ô Ô). All of those are considered separate letters and are placed directly after the original counterpart in the alphabet.
- The basic Slovenian alphabet has the symbols ⟨č⟩, ⟨š⟩, and ⟨ž⟩, which are considered separate letters and are listed as such in dictionaries and other contexts in which words are listed according to alphabetical order. Letters with a caron are placed right after the letters as written without the diacritic. The letter ⟨đ⟩ ('d with bar') may be used in non-transliterated foreign words, particularly names, and is placed after ⟨č⟩ and before ⟨d⟩.

==== Turkic ====
- Azerbaijani includes the distinct Turkish alphabet letters Ç, Ğ, I, İ, Ö, Ş and Ü.
- Crimean Tatar includes the distinct Turkish alphabet letters Ç, Ğ, I, İ, Ö, Ş and Ü. Unlike Turkish, Crimean Tatar also has the letter Ñ.
- Gagauz includes the distinct Turkish alphabet letters Ç, Ğ, I, İ, Ö and Ü. Unlike Turkish, Gagauz also has the letters Ä, Ê Ș and Ț. Ș and Ț are derived from the Romanian alphabet for the same sounds. Sometime the Turkish Ş may be used instead of Ș.
- Turkish uses a ⟨G⟩ with a breve (⟨Ğ⟩), two letters with two dots (⟨Ö⟩ and ⟨Ü⟩, representing two rounded front vowels), two letters with a cedilla (⟨Ç⟩ and ⟨Ş⟩, representing the affricate /tʃ/ and the fricative /ʃ/), and also possesses a dotted capital ⟨İ⟩ (and a dotless lowercase ⟨ı⟩ representing a high unrounded back vowel). In Turkish each of these are separate letters, rather than versions of other letters, where dotted capital ⟨İ⟩ and lower case ⟨i⟩ are the same letter, as are dotless capital ⟨I⟩ and lowercase ⟨ı⟩. Typographically, ⟨Ç⟩ and ⟨Ş⟩ are sometimes rendered with an underdot, as in ⟨Ṣ⟩. The new Azerbaijani, Crimean Tatar, and Gagauz alphabets are based on the Turkish alphabet and its same diacriticized letters, with some additions.
- Turkmen includes the distinct Turkish alphabet letters Ç, Ö, Ş and Ü. In addition, Turkmen uses A with diaeresis (Ä) to represent /æ/, N with caron (⟨Ň⟩) to represent the velar nasal /ŋ/, Y with acute (⟨Ý⟩) to represent the palatal approximant /j/, and Z with caron (⟨Ž⟩) to represent /ʒ/.

==== Other ====
- Albanian has two special letters Ç and Ë upper and lowercase. They are placed next to the most similar letters in the alphabet, c and e correspondingly.
- Esperanto has the symbols ŭ, ĉ, ĝ, ĥ, ĵ and ŝ, which are included in the alphabet, and considered separate letters.
- Filipino also has the character ñ as a letter and is collated between letters n and ng.
- Modern Greenlandic does not use any diacritics, although ø and å are used to spell loanwords, especially from Danish and English. From 1851 until 1973, Greenlandic was written in an alphabet invented by Samuel Kleinschmidt, where long vowels and geminate consonants were indicated by diacritics on vowels (in the case of consonant gemination, the diacritics were placed on the vowel preceding the affected consonant). For example, the name Kalaallit Nunaat was spelled Kalâdlit Nunât. This scheme uses the circumflex (◌̂) to indicate a long vowel (e.g. ⟨ât, ît, ût⟩; modern: ⟨aat, iit, uut⟩), an acute accent (◌́) to indicate gemination of the following consonant: (i.e. ⟨ák, ík, úk⟩; modern: ⟨akk, ikk, ukk⟩) and, finally, a tilde (◌̃) or a grave accent (◌̀), depending on the author, indicates vowel length and gemination of the following consonant (e.g. ⟨ãt/àt, ĩt/ìt, ũt/ùt⟩; modern: ⟨aatt, iitt, uutt⟩). ⟨ê, ô⟩, used only before ⟨r, q⟩, are now written ⟨ee, oo⟩ in Greenlandic.
- Hawaiian uses the kahakō (macron) over vowels, although there is some disagreement over considering them as individual letters. The kahakō over a vowel can completely change the meaning of a word that is spelled the same but without the kahakō.
- Kurdish uses the symbols Ç, Ê, Î, Ş and Û with other 26 standard Latin alphabet symbols.
- Lakota alphabet uses the caron for the letters č, ȟ, ǧ, š, and ž. It also uses the acute accent for stressed vowels á, é, í, ó, ú, áŋ, íŋ, úŋ.
- Malay uses some diacritics such as á, ā, ç, í, ñ, ó, š, ú. Uses of diacritics was continued until late 19th century except ā and ē.
- Maltese uses a C, G, and Z with a dot over them (Ċ, Ġ, Ż), and also has an H with an extra horizontal bar. For uppercase H, the extra bar is written slightly above the usual bar. For lowercase H, the extra bar is written crossing the vertical, like a t, and not touching the lower part (Ħ, ħ). The above characters are considered separate letters. The letter 'c' without a dot has fallen out of use due to redundancy. 'Ċ' is pronounced like the English 'ch' and 'k' is used as a hard c as in 'cat'. 'Ż' is pronounced just like the English 'Z' as in 'Zebra', while 'Z' is used to make the sound of 'ts' in English (like 'tsunami' or 'maths'). 'Ġ' is used as a soft 'G' like in 'geometry', while the 'G' sounds like a hard 'G' like in 'log'. The digraph 'għ' (called għajn after the Arabic letter name ʻayn for غ) is considered separate, and sometimes ordered after 'g', whilst in other volumes it is placed between 'n' and 'o' (the Latin letter 'o' originally evolved from the shape of Phoenician ʻayin, which was traditionally collated after Phoenician nūn).
- The romanization of Syriac uses the altered letters of. Ā, Č, Ḏ, Ē, Ë, Ġ, Ḥ, Ō, Š, Ṣ, Ṭ, Ū, Ž alongside the 26 standard Latin alphabet symbols.
- Vietnamese uses the horn diacritic for the letters ơ and ư; the circumflex for the letters â, ê, and ô; the breve for the letter ă; and a bar through the letter đ. Separately, it also has á, à, ả, ã and ạ, the five tones used for vowels besides the flat tone 'a'.

=== Cyrillic letters ===
- Belarusian and Uzbek Cyrillic have a letter ⟨ў⟩.
- Belarusian, Bulgarian, Russian and Ukrainian have the letter ⟨й⟩.
- Belarusian and Russian have the letter ⟨ё⟩. In Russian, this letter is usually replaced by ⟨е⟩, although it has a different pronunciation. The use of ⟨е⟩ instead of ⟨ё⟩ does not affect the pronunciation. Ё is always used in children's books and in dictionaries. A minimal pair is все (vs'e, "everybody" pl.) and всё (vs'o, "everything" n. sg.). In Belarusian the replacement by ⟨е⟩ is a mistake; in Russian, it is permissible to use either ⟨е⟩ or ⟨ё⟩ for ⟨ё⟩ but the former is more common in everyday writing (as opposed to instructional or juvenile writing).
- The Cyrillic Ukrainian alphabet has the letters ⟨ґ⟩, ⟨й⟩ and ⟨ї⟩. Ukrainian Latynka has many more.
- Macedonian has the letters ⟨ќ⟩ and ⟨ѓ⟩.
- In Bulgarian and Macedonian the possessive pronoun ѝ (ì, "her") is spelled with a grave accent in order to distinguish it from the conjunction и (i, "and").
- The acute accent ◌́ above any vowel in Cyrillic alphabets is used in dictionaries, books for children and foreign learners to indicate the word stress, it also can be used for disambiguation of similarly spelled words with different lexical stresses.

== Diacritics that do not produce new letters ==
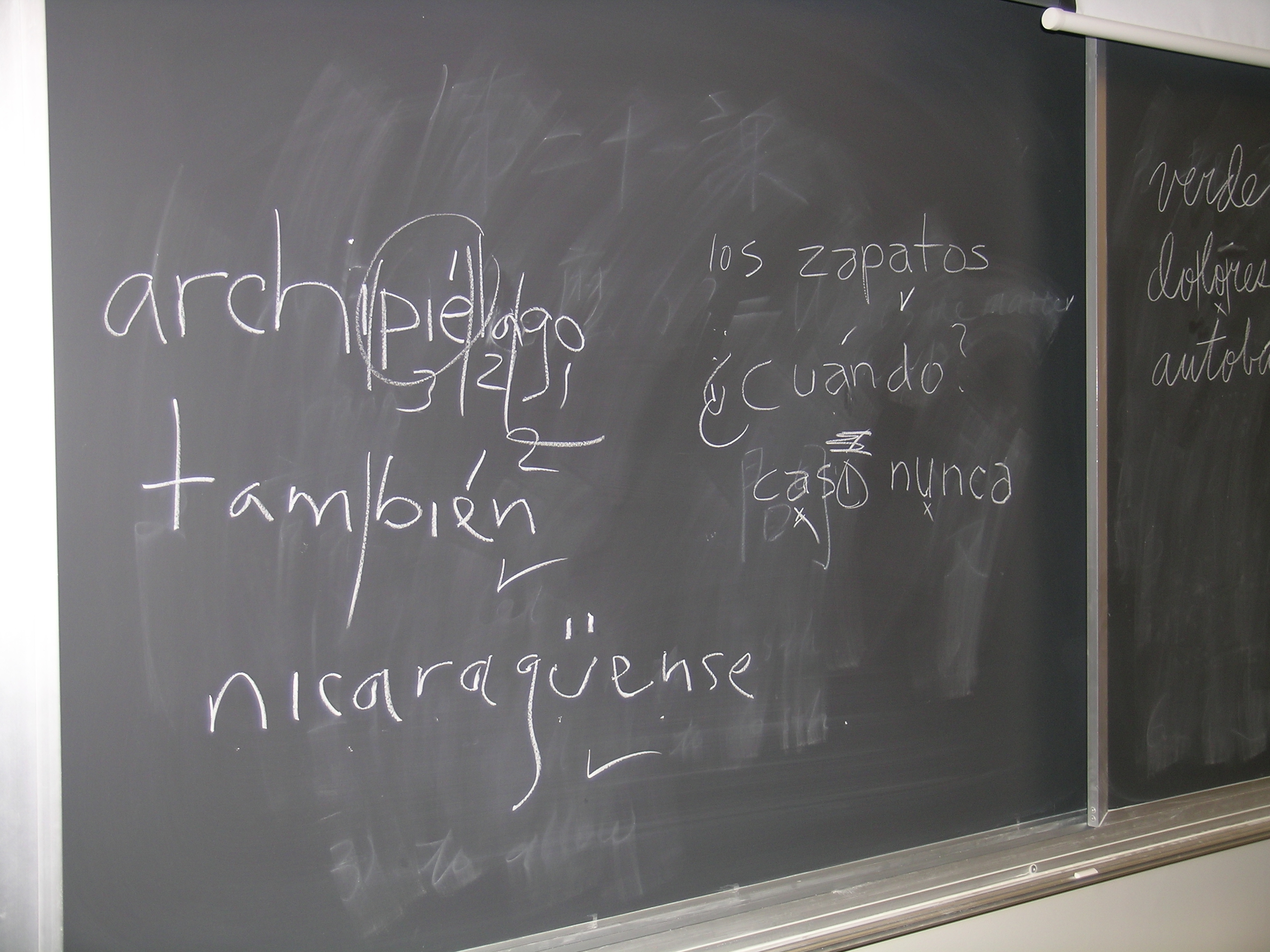
Blackboard used in class at Harvard shows students' efforts at placing the ü and acute accent diacritic used in Spanish orthography.

=== English ===
English is one of the few European languages that does not have many words that contain diacritical marks. Instead, digraphs are the main way the Modern English alphabet adapts the Latin alphabet to its phonemes. Exceptions are unassimilated foreign loanwords, including borrowings from French (and, increasingly, Spanish, like jalapeño and piñata); however, the diacritic is also sometimes omitted from such words. Loanwords that frequently appear with the diacritic in English include café, résumé or resumé (a usage that helps distinguish it from the verb resume), soufflé, and naïveté (see English terms with diacritical marks). In older practice (and even among some orthographically conservative modern writers), one may see examples such as élite, mêlée and rôle.

English speakers and writers once used the diaeresis more often than now in words such as coöperation (from Fr. coopération), zoölogy (from Grk. zoologia), and seeër (now more commonly see-er or simply seer) as a way of indicating that adjacent vowels belonged to separate syllables, but this practice has become far less common. The New Yorker magazine is a major publication that continues to use the diaeresis in place of a hyphen for clarity and economy of space.

A few English words, often when used out of context, especially in isolation, can only be distinguished from other words of the same spelling by using a diacritic or modified letter. These include exposé, lamé, maté, öre, øre, résumé and rosé. In a few words, diacritics that did not exist in the original have been added for disambiguation, as in maté (from Sp. and Port. mate), saké (the standard Romanization of the Japanese has no accent mark), and Malé (from Dhivehi މާލެ), to clearly distinguish them from the English words mate, sake, and male.

The acute and grave accents are occasionally used in poetry and lyrics: the acute to indicate stress overtly where it might be ambiguous (rébel vs. rebél) or nonstandard for metrical reasons (caléndar), the grave to indicate that an ordinarily silent or elided syllable is pronounced (warnèd, parlìament).

In certain personal names such as Renée and Zoë, often two spellings exist, and the person's own preference will be known only to those close to them. Even when the name of a person is spelled with a diacritic, like Charlotte Brontë, this may be dropped in English-language articles, and even in official documents such as passports, due either to carelessness, the typist not knowing how to enter letters with diacritical marks, or technical reasons (California, for example, does not allow names with diacritics, as the computer system cannot process such characters). They also appear in some worldwide company names and/or trademarks, such as Nestlé and Citroën.

=== Other languages ===
The following languages have letter-diacritic combinations that are not considered independent letters.

- Afrikaans uses a diaeresis to mark vowels that are pronounced separately and not as one would expect where they occur together, for example voel (to feel) as opposed to voël (bird). The circumflex is used in ê, î, ô and û generally to indicate long close-mid, as opposed to open-mid vowels, for example in the words wêreld (world) and môre (morning, tomorrow). The acute accent is used to add emphasis in the same way as underlining or writing in bold or italics in English, for example Dit is jóú boek (It is **your** book). The grave accent is used to distinguish between words that are different only in placement of the stress, for example appel (apple) and appèl (appeal) and in a few cases where it makes no difference to the pronunciation but distinguishes between homophones. The two most usual cases of the latter are in the sayings òf... òf (either... or) and nòg... nòg (neither... nor) to distinguish them from of (or) and nog (again, still).
- Aymara uses a diacritical horn over p, q, t, k, ch.
- Catalan has the following composite characters: à, ç, é, è, í, ï, ó, ò, ú, ü, l·l. The acute and the grave indicate stress and vowel height, the cedilla marks the result of a historical palatalization, the diaeresis indicates either a hiatus, or that the letter u is pronounced when the graphemes gü, qü are followed by e or i, the interpunct (·) distinguishes the different values of ll/l·l.
- Some orthographies of Cornish such as Kernowek Standard and Unified Cornish use diacritics, while others such as Kernewek Kemmyn and the Standard Written Form do not (or only use them optionally in teaching materials).
- Dutch uses the diaeresis. For example, in ruïne it means that the u and the i are separately pronounced in their usual way, and not in the way that the combination ui is normally pronounced. Thus it works as a separation sign and not as an indication for an alternative version of the i. Diacritics can be used for emphasis (érg koud for very cold) or for disambiguation between a number of words that are spelled the same when context does not indicate the correct meaning (één appel = one apple, een appel = an apple; vóórkomen = to occur, voorkómen = to prevent). Grave and acute accents are used on a very small number of words, mostly loanwords. The ç also appears in some loanwords.
- Faroese. Non-Faroese accented letters are not added to the Faroese alphabet. These include é, ö, ü, å and recently also letters like š, ł, and ć.
- Filipino has the following composite characters: á, à, â, é, è, ê, ë, ë́, ë̀, ë̂, í, ì, î, ó, ò, ô, ú, ù, û. Everyday use of diacritics for Filipino is, however, uncommon, and meant only to distinguish between homonyms between a word with the usual penultimate stress and one with a different stress placement. This aids both comprehension and pronunciation if both are relatively adjacent in a text, or if a word is itself ambiguous in meaning. The letter ñ ("eñe") is not a n with a diacritic, but rather collated as a separate letter, one of eight borrowed from Spanish. Diacritics appear in Spanish loanwords and names observing Spanish orthography rules. ë is only used to mark the schwa (/ə/).
- Finnish. Carons in š and ž appear only in foreign proper names and loanwords, but may be substituted with sh or zh if and only if it is technically impossible to produce accented letters in the medium. Contrary to Estonian, š and ž are not considered distinct letters in Finnish.
- French uses five diacritics. The grave (accent grave) marks the sound /ɛ/ when over an e, as in père ("father") or is used to distinguish words that are otherwise homographs such as a/à ("has"/"to") or ou/où ("or"/"where"). The acute (accent aigu) is only used in "é", modifying the "e" to make the sound /e/, as in étoile ("star"). The circumflex (accent circonflexe) generally denotes that an "s" once followed the vowel in Old French or Latin, as in fête ("party"), the Old French being feste and the Latin being festum. Whether the circumflex modifies the vowel's pronunciation depends on the dialect and the vowel. The cedilla (cédille) indicates that a normally hard "c" (before the vowels "a", "o", and "u") is to be pronounced /s/, as in ça ("that"). The diaeresis diacritic (French: tréma) indicates that two adjacent vowels that would normally be pronounced as one are to be pronounced separately, as in Noël ("Christmas").
- Galician vowels can bear an acute (á, é, í, ó, ú) to indicate stress or difference between two otherwise same written words (é, 'is' vs. e, 'and'), but the diaeresis is only used with ï and ü to show two separate vowel sounds in pronunciation. Only in foreign words may Galician use other diacritics such as ç (common during the Middle Ages), ê, or à.
- German uses the three umlauted characters ä, ö and ü. These diacritics indicate vowel changes. For instance, the word Ofen [ˈoːfən] "oven" has the plural Öfen [ˈøːfən]. The mark originated as a superscript e; a handwritten blackletter e resembles two parallel vertical lines, like a diaeresis. Due to this history, "ä", "ö" and "ü" can be written as "ae", "oe" and "ue" respectively, if the umlaut letters are not available.
- Hebrew has many various diacritic marks known as niqqud that are used above and below script to represent vowels. These must be distinguished from cantillation, which are keys to pronunciation and syntax.
- The International Phonetic Alphabet uses diacritic symbols and characters to indicate phonetic features or secondary articulations.
- Irish uses the acute to indicate that a vowel is long: á, é, í, ó, ú. It is known as síneadh fada "long sign" or simply fada "long" in Irish. In the older Gaelic type, overdots are used to indicate lenition of a consonant: ḃ, ċ, ḋ, ḟ, ġ, ṁ, ṗ, ṡ, ṫ.
- Italian mainly has the acute and the grave (à, è/é, ì, ò/ó, ù), typically to indicate a stressed syllable that would not be stressed under the normal rules of pronunciation but sometimes also to distinguish between words that are otherwise spelled the same way (e.g. "e", and; "è", is). Despite its rare use, Italian orthography allows the circumflex (î) too, in two cases: it can be found in old literary context (roughly up to 19th century) to signal a syncope (fêro→fecero, they did), or in modern Italian to signal the contraction of ″-ii″ due to the plural ending -i whereas the root ends with another -i; e.g., s. demonio, p. demonii→demonî; in this case the circumflex also signals that the word intended is not demoni, plural of "demone" by shifting the accent (demònî, "devils"; dèmoni, "demons").
- Lithuanian uses the acute, grave and tilde in dictionaries to indicate stress types in the language's pitch accent system.
- Maltese also uses the grave on its vowels to indicate stress at the end of a word with two syllables or more:– lowercase letters: à, è, ì, ò, ù; capital letters: À, È, Ì, Ò, Ù
- Māori makes use of macrons to mark long vowels.
- Occitan has the following composite characters: á, à, ç, é, è, í, ï, ó, ò, ú, ü, n·h, s·h. The acute and the grave indicate stress and vowel height, the cedilla marks the result of a historical palatalization, the diaeresis indicates either a hiatus, or that the letter u is pronounced when the graphemes gü, qü are followed by e or i, and the interpunct (·) distinguishes the different values of nh/n·h and sh/s·h (i.e., that the letters are supposed to be pronounced separately, not combined into "ny" and "sh").
- Portuguese has the following composite characters: à, á, â, ã, ç, é, ê, í, ó, ô, õ, ú. The acute and the circumflex indicate stress and vowel height, the grave indicates the fusion of the preposition a ("to") with a demonstrative or feminine definite article such as in àquele ("to that") and is also used to distinguish it from the feminine singular definite article a when it's followed by a feminine noun or feminine adjective, the tilde represents nasalization, and the cedilla indicate that "c" should be pronounced /s/ before "a", "o" and "u", as in aço ("steel").
- Acutes are also used in Slavic language dictionaries and textbooks to indicate lexical stress, placed over the vowel of the stressed syllable. This can also serve to disambiguate meaning (e.g., in Russian писа́ть (pisáť) means "to write", but пи́сать (písať) means "to piss"), or "бо́льшая часть" (the biggest part) vs "больша́я часть" (the big part).
- Spanish uses the acute and the diaeresis. The acute is used on a vowel in a stressed syllable in words with irregular stress patterns. It can also be used to "break up" a diphthong as in tío (pronounced [ˈti.o], rather than [ˈtjo] as it would be without the accent). Moreover, the acute can be used to distinguish words that otherwise are spelled alike, such as si ("if") and sí ("yes"), and also to distinguish interrogative and exclamatory pronouns from homophones with a different grammatical function, such as donde/¿dónde? ("where"/"where?") or como/¿cómo? ("like"/"how?"). The acute may also be used to avoid typographical ambiguity, as in 1 ó 2 ("1 or 2"; without the acute this might be interpreted as "1 0 2". The diaeresis is used only over u (ü) for it to be pronounced [w] in the combinations gue and gui, where u is normally silent, for example ambigüedad. In poetry, the diaeresis may be used on i and u as a way to force a hiatus. As said above, in nasal ñ the tilde (squiggle) is not considered a diacritic sign at all, but a composite part of a distinct glyph, with its own chapter in the dictionary: a glyph that denotes the 15th letter of the Spanish alphabet.
- Swedish uses the acute to show non-standard stress, for example in kafé (café) and resumé (résumé). This occasionally helps resolve ambiguities, such as ide (hibernation) versus idé (idea). In these words, the acute is not optional. Some proper names use non-standard diacritics, such as Carolina Klüft and Staël von Holstein. For foreign loanwords the original accents are strongly recommended, unless the word has been infused into the language, in which case they are optional. Hence crème fraîche but ampere. Swedish also has the letters å, ä, and ö, but these are considered distinct letters, not a and o with diacritics.
- Tamil does not have any diacritics in itself, but uses the Arabic numerals 2, 3 and 4 as diacritics to represent aspirated, voiced, and voiced-aspirated consonants when Tamil script is used to write long passages in Sanskrit.
- Thai has its own system of diacritics derived from Indian numerals, which denote different tones.
- Vietnamese uses the acute (dấu sắc), the grave (dấu huyền), the tilde (dấu ngã), the underdot (dấu nặng) and the hook above (dấu hỏi) on vowels as tone indicators.
- Welsh uses the circumflex, diaeresis, acute, and grave on its seven vowels a, e, i, o, u, w, y. The most common is the circumflex (which it calls to bach, meaning "little roof", or acen grom "crooked accent", or hirnod "long sign") to denote a long vowel, usually to disambiguate it from a similar word with a short vowel or a semivowel. The rarer grave accent has the opposite effect, shortening vowel sounds that would usually be pronounced long. The acute accent and diaeresis are also occasionally used, to denote stress and vowel separation respectively. The w-circumflex ŵ and the y-circumflex ŷ are among the most commonly accented characters in Welsh, but unusual in languages generally, and were until recently very hard to obtain in word-processed and HTML documents.

== Transliteration ==
Several languages that are not written with the Roman alphabet are transliterated, or romanized, using diacritics. Examples:

- Arabic has several romanisations, depending on the type of the application, region, intended audience, country, etc. many of them extensively use diacritics, e.g., some methods use an underdot for rendering emphatic consonants (ṣ, ṭ, ḍ, ẓ, ḥ). The macron is often used to render long vowels. š is often used for /ʃ/, ġ for /ɣ/.
- Chinese has several romanizations that use the umlaut, but only on u (ü). In Hanyu Pinyin, the four tones of Mandarin Chinese are denoted by the macron (first tone), acute (second tone), caron (third tone) and grave (fourth tone) diacritics. Example: ā, á, ǎ, à.
- Romanized Japanese (Rōmaji) occasionally uses macrons to mark long vowels. The Hepburn romanization system uses macrons to mark long vowels, and the Kunrei-shiki and Nihon-shiki systems use a circumflex.
- Sanskrit, as well as many of its descendants, like Hindi and Bengali, uses a lossless romanization system, IAST. This includes several letters with diacritical markings, such as the macron (ā, ī, ū), over- and underdots (ṛ, ḥ, ṃ, ṇ, ṣ, ṭ, ḍ) as well as a few others (ś, ñ).

== Limits ==
=== Orthographic ===
Possibly the greatest number of combining diacritics required to compose a valid character in any Unicode-supported language is 8, for the following "well-known grapheme cluster in Tibetan and Ranjana scripts" (although "[i]t is likely that there exist a few combinations even longer"):

1. U+0F67 ཧ TIBETAN LETTER HA (base letter)
2. U+0F90 ྐ TIBETAN SUBJOINED LETTER KA
3. U+0FB5 ྵ TIBETAN SUBJOINED LETTER SSA
4. U+0FA8 ྨ TIBETAN SUBJOINED LETTER MA
5. U+0FB3 ླ TIBETAN SUBJOINED LETTER LA
6. U+0FBA ྺ TIBETAN SUBJOINED LETTER FIXED-FORM WA
7. U+0FBC ྼ TIBETAN SUBJOINED LETTER FIXED-FORM RA
8. U+0FBB ྻ TIBETAN SUBJOINED LETTER FIXED-FORM YA
9. U+0F82 ྂ TIBETAN SIGN NYI ZLA NAA DA

An example of the rendering, which may be broken depending on the browser used:

ཧྐྵྨླྺྼྻྂ

This is hkṣmlwryaṁ (ha kṣa ma la va ra yaṁ)

=== Unorthographic/ornamental ===
Some users have explored the limits of rendering in web browsers and other software by "decorating" words with excessive nonsensical diacritics per character to produce so-called Zalgo text.

== List of diacritics in Unicode ==
Diacritics for Latin script in Unicode:

Diacritics in Unicode for Latin script
Character	Character name Unicode code point	Mark	General category	Script
◌̀o	COMBINING GRAVE ACCENT; U+0300	Grave	Mn: Mark, nonspacing	Inherited
◌́o	COMBINING ACUTE ACCENT; U+0301	Acute	Mn: Mark, nonspacing	Inherited
◌̂o	COMBINING CIRCUMFLEX ACCENT; U+0302	Circumflex	Mn: Mark, nonspacing	Inherited
◌̃o	COMBINING TILDE; U+0303	Tilde	Mn: Mark, nonspacing	Inherited
◌̄o	COMBINING MACRON; U+0304	Macron	Mn: Mark, nonspacing	Inherited
◌̅o	COMBINING OVERLINE; U+0305	Overline	Mn: Mark, nonspacing	Inherited
◌̆o	COMBINING BREVE; U+0306	Breve	Mn: Mark, nonspacing	Inherited
◌̇o	COMBINING DOT ABOVE; U+0307	Dot	Mn: Mark, nonspacing	Inherited
◌̈o	COMBINING DIAERESIS; U+0308	Diaeresis	Mn: Mark, nonspacing	Inherited
◌̉o	COMBINING HOOK ABOVE; U+0309	Hook	Mn: Mark, nonspacing	Inherited
◌̊o	COMBINING RING ABOVE; U+030A	Ring	Mn: Mark, nonspacing	Inherited
◌̋o	COMBINING DOUBLE ACUTE ACCENT; U+030B	Double acute	Mn: Mark, nonspacing	Inherited
◌̌o	COMBINING CARON; U+030C	Caron	Mn: Mark, nonspacing	Inherited
◌̍o	COMBINING VERTICAL LINE ABOVE; U+030D	Vertical line	Mn: Mark, nonspacing	Inherited
◌̎o	COMBINING DOUBLE VERTICAL LINE ABOVE; U+030E	Double vertical line	Mn: Mark, nonspacing	Inherited
◌̏o	COMBINING DOUBLE GRAVE ACCENT; U+030F	Double grave	Mn: Mark, nonspacing	Inherited
◌̐o	COMBINING CANDRABINDU; U+0310	Candrabindu	Mn: Mark, nonspacing	Inherited
◌̑o	COMBINING INVERTED BREVE; U+0311	Inverted breve	Mn: Mark, nonspacing	Inherited
◌̒o	COMBINING TURNED COMMA ABOVE; U+0312	Turned comma	Mn: Mark, nonspacing	Inherited
◌̓o	COMBINING COMMA ABOVE; U+0313	Comma	Mn: Mark, nonspacing	Inherited
◌̔o	COMBINING REVERSED COMMA ABOVE; U+0314	Reversed comma	Mn: Mark, nonspacing	Inherited
◌̕o	COMBINING COMMA ABOVE RIGHT; U+0315	Comma right	Mn: Mark, nonspacing	Inherited
◌̖o	COMBINING GRAVE ACCENT BELOW; U+0316	Grave	Mn: Mark, nonspacing	Inherited
◌̗o	COMBINING ACUTE ACCENT BELOW; U+0317	Acute	Mn: Mark, nonspacing	Inherited
◌̘o	COMBINING LEFT TACK BELOW; U+0318	Left tack	Mn: Mark, nonspacing	Inherited
◌̙o	COMBINING RIGHT TACK BELOW; U+0319	Right tack	Mn: Mark, nonspacing	Inherited
◌̚o	COMBINING LEFT ANGLE ABOVE; U+031A	Left angle	Mn: Mark, nonspacing	Inherited
◌̛o	COMBINING HORN; U+031B	Horn	Mn: Mark, nonspacing	Inherited
◌̜o	COMBINING LEFT HALF RING BELOW; U+031C	Left half ring	Mn: Mark, nonspacing	Inherited
◌̝o	COMBINING UP TACK BELOW; U+031D	Up tack	Mn: Mark, nonspacing	Inherited
◌̞o	COMBINING DOWN TACK BELOW; U+031E	Down tack	Mn: Mark, nonspacing	Inherited
◌̟o	COMBINING PLUS SIGN BELOW; U+031F	Plus sign	Mn: Mark, nonspacing	Inherited
◌̠o	COMBINING MINUS SIGN BELOW; U+0320	Minus sign	Mn: Mark, nonspacing	Inherited
◌̡o	COMBINING PALATALIZED HOOK BELOW; U+0321	Palatalized hook	Mn: Mark, nonspacing	Inherited
◌̢o	COMBINING RETROFLEX HOOK BELOW; U+0322	Retroflex hook	Mn: Mark, nonspacing	Inherited
◌̣o	COMBINING DOT BELOW; U+0323	Dot	Mn: Mark, nonspacing	Inherited
◌̤o	COMBINING DIAERESIS BELOW; U+0324	Diaeresis	Mn: Mark, nonspacing	Inherited
◌̥o	COMBINING RING BELOW; U+0325	Ring	Mn: Mark, nonspacing	Inherited
◌̦o	COMBINING COMMA BELOW; U+0326	Comma	Mn: Mark, nonspacing	Inherited
◌̧o	COMBINING CEDILLA; U+0327	Cedilla	Mn: Mark, nonspacing	Inherited
◌̨o	COMBINING OGONEK; U+0328	Ogonek	Mn: Mark, nonspacing	Inherited
◌̩o	COMBINING VERTICAL LINE BELOW; U+0329	Vertical line	Mn: Mark, nonspacing	Inherited
◌̪o	COMBINING BRIDGE BELOW; U+032A	Bridge	Mn: Mark, nonspacing	Inherited
◌̫o	COMBINING INVERTED DOUBLE ARCH BELOW; U+032B	Double arch	Mn: Mark, nonspacing	Inherited
◌̬o	COMBINING CARON BELOW; U+032C	Caron	Mn: Mark, nonspacing	Inherited
◌̭o	COMBINING CIRCUMFLEX ACCENT BELOW; U+032D	Circumflex	Mn: Mark, nonspacing	Inherited
◌̮o	COMBINING BREVE BELOW; U+032E	Breve	Mn: Mark, nonspacing	Inherited
◌̯o	COMBINING INVERTED BREVE BELOW; U+032F	Inverted breve	Mn: Mark, nonspacing	Inherited
◌̰o	COMBINING TILDE BELOW; U+0330	Tilde	Mn: Mark, nonspacing	Inherited
◌̱o	COMBINING MACRON BELOW; U+0331	Macron	Mn: Mark, nonspacing	Inherited
◌̲o	COMBINING LOW LINE; U+0332	Low line	Mn: Mark, nonspacing	Inherited
◌̳o	COMBINING DOUBLE LOW LINE; U+0333	Double low line	Mn: Mark, nonspacing	Inherited
◌̴o	COMBINING TILDE OVERLAY; U+0334	Tilde overlay	Mn: Mark, nonspacing	Inherited
◌̵o	COMBINING SHORT STROKE OVERLAY; U+0335	Short stroke overlay	Mn: Mark, nonspacing	Inherited
◌̶o	COMBINING LONG STROKE OVERLAY; U+0336	Long stroke overlay	Mn: Mark, nonspacing	Inherited
◌̷o	COMBINING SHORT SOLIDUS OVERLAY; U+0337	Short solidus overlay	Mn: Mark, nonspacing	Inherited
◌̸o	COMBINING LONG SOLIDUS OVERLAY; U+0338	Long solidus overlay	Mn: Mark, nonspacing	Inherited
◌̹o	COMBINING RIGHT HALF RING BELOW; U+0339	Right half ring	Mn: Mark, nonspacing	Inherited
◌̺o	COMBINING INVERTED BRIDGE BELOW; U+033A	Inverted bridge	Mn: Mark, nonspacing	Inherited
◌̻o	COMBINING SQUARE BELOW; U+033B	Square	Mn: Mark, nonspacing	Inherited
◌̼o	COMBINING SEAGULL BELOW; U+033C	Seagull	Mn: Mark, nonspacing	Inherited
◌̽o	COMBINING X ABOVE; U+033D	X	Mn: Mark, nonspacing	Inherited
◌̾o	COMBINING VERTICAL TILDE; U+033E	Vertical tilde	Mn: Mark, nonspacing	Inherited
◌̿o	COMBINING DOUBLE OVERLINE; U+033F	Double overline	Mn: Mark, nonspacing	Inherited
◌̀o	COMBINING GRAVE TONE MARK; U+0340	Grave tone	Mn: Mark, nonspacing	Inherited
◌́o	COMBINING ACUTE TONE MARK; U+0341	Acute tone	Mn: Mark, nonspacing	Inherited
◌͆o	COMBINING BRIDGE ABOVE; U+0346	Bridge	Mn: Mark, nonspacing	Inherited
◌͇o	COMBINING EQUALS SIGN BELOW; U+0347	Equals sign	Mn: Mark, nonspacing	Inherited
◌͈o	COMBINING DOUBLE VERTICAL LINE BELOW; U+0348	Double vertical line	Mn: Mark, nonspacing	Inherited
◌͉o	COMBINING LEFT ANGLE BELOW; U+0349	Left angle	Mn: Mark, nonspacing	Inherited
◌͊o	COMBINING NOT TILDE ABOVE; U+034A	Not tilde	Mn: Mark, nonspacing	Inherited
◌͋o	COMBINING HOMOTHETIC ABOVE; U+034B	Homothetic	Mn: Mark, nonspacing	Inherited
◌͌o	COMBINING ALMOST EQUAL TO ABOVE; U+034C	Almost equal to	Mn: Mark, nonspacing	Inherited
◌͍o	COMBINING LEFT RIGHT ARROW BELOW; U+034D	Left right arrow	Mn: Mark, nonspacing	Inherited
◌͎o	COMBINING UPWARDS ARROW BELOW; U+034E	Upwards arrow	Mn: Mark, nonspacing	Inherited
◌͐o	COMBINING RIGHT ARROWHEAD ABOVE; U+0350	Right arrowhead	Mn: Mark, nonspacing	Inherited
◌͑o	COMBINING LEFT HALF RING ABOVE; U+0351	Left half ring	Mn: Mark, nonspacing	Inherited
◌͒o	COMBINING FERMATA; U+0352	Fermata	Mn: Mark, nonspacing	Inherited
◌͓o	COMBINING X BELOW; U+0353	X	Mn: Mark, nonspacing	Inherited
◌͔o	COMBINING LEFT ARROWHEAD BELOW; U+0354	Left arrowhead	Mn: Mark, nonspacing	Inherited
◌͕o	COMBINING RIGHT ARROWHEAD BELOW; U+0355	Right arrowhead	Mn: Mark, nonspacing	Inherited
◌͖o	COMBINING RIGHT ARROWHEAD AND UP ARROWHEAD BELOW; U+0356	Right arrowhead and up arrowhead	Mn: Mark, nonspacing	Inherited
◌͗o	COMBINING RIGHT HALF RING ABOVE; U+0357	Right half ring	Mn: Mark, nonspacing	Inherited
◌͘o	COMBINING DOT ABOVE RIGHT; U+0358	Dot right	Mn: Mark, nonspacing	Inherited
◌͙o	COMBINING ASTERISK BELOW; U+0359	Asterisk	Mn: Mark, nonspacing	Inherited
◌͚o	COMBINING DOUBLE RING BELOW; U+035A	Double ring	Mn: Mark, nonspacing	Inherited
◌͛o	COMBINING ZIGZAG ABOVE; U+035B	Zigzag	Mn: Mark, nonspacing	Inherited
◌͜◌o	COMBINING DOUBLE BREVE BELOW; U+035C	Double breve	Mn: Mark, nonspacing	Inherited
◌͝◌o	COMBINING DOUBLE BREVE; U+035D	Double breve	Mn: Mark, nonspacing	Inherited
◌͞◌o	COMBINING DOUBLE MACRON; U+035E	Double macron	Mn: Mark, nonspacing	Inherited
◌͟◌o	COMBINING DOUBLE MACRON BELOW; U+035F	Double macron	Mn: Mark, nonspacing	Inherited
◌͠◌o	COMBINING DOUBLE TILDE; U+0360	Double tilde	Mn: Mark, nonspacing	Inherited
◌͡◌o	COMBINING DOUBLE INVERTED BREVE; U+0361	Double inverted breve	Mn: Mark, nonspacing	Inherited
◌͢◌o	COMBINING DOUBLE RIGHTWARDS ARROW BELOW; U+0362	Double rightwards arrow	Mn: Mark, nonspacing	Inherited
◌ͣo	COMBINING LATIN SMALL LETTER A; U+0363	Latin small letter a	Mn: Mark, nonspacing	Inherited
◌ͤo	COMBINING LATIN SMALL LETTER E; U+0364	Latin small letter e	Mn: Mark, nonspacing	Inherited
◌ͥo	COMBINING LATIN SMALL LETTER I; U+0365	Latin small letter i	Mn: Mark, nonspacing	Inherited
◌ͦo	COMBINING LATIN SMALL LETTER O; U+0366	Latin small letter o	Mn: Mark, nonspacing	Inherited
◌ͧo	COMBINING LATIN SMALL LETTER U; U+0367	Latin small letter u	Mn: Mark, nonspacing	Inherited
◌ͨo	COMBINING LATIN SMALL LETTER C; U+0368	Latin small letter c	Mn: Mark, nonspacing	Inherited
◌ͩo	COMBINING LATIN SMALL LETTER D; U+0369	Latin small letter d	Mn: Mark, nonspacing	Inherited
◌ͪo	COMBINING LATIN SMALL LETTER H; U+036A	Latin small letter h	Mn: Mark, nonspacing	Inherited
◌ͫo	COMBINING LATIN SMALL LETTER M; U+036B	Latin small letter m	Mn: Mark, nonspacing	Inherited
◌ͬo	COMBINING LATIN SMALL LETTER R; U+036C	Latin small letter r	Mn: Mark, nonspacing	Inherited
◌ͭo	COMBINING LATIN SMALL LETTER T; U+036D	Latin small letter t	Mn: Mark, nonspacing	Inherited
◌ͮo	COMBINING LATIN SMALL LETTER V; U+036E	Latin small letter v	Mn: Mark, nonspacing	Inherited
◌ͯo	COMBINING LATIN SMALL LETTER X; U+036F	Latin small letter x	Mn: Mark, nonspacing	Inherited
◌᪰o	COMBINING DOUBLED CIRCUMFLEX ACCENT; U+1AB0	Doubled circumflex	Mn: Mark, nonspacing	Inherited
◌᪱o	COMBINING DIAERESIS-RING; U+1AB1	Diaeresis-ring	Mn: Mark, nonspacing	Inherited
◌᪲o	COMBINING INFINITY; U+1AB2	Infinity	Mn: Mark, nonspacing	Inherited
◌᪳o	COMBINING DOWNWARDS ARROW; U+1AB3	Downwards arrow	Mn: Mark, nonspacing	Inherited
◌᪴o	COMBINING TRIPLE DOT; U+1AB4	Triple dot	Mn: Mark, nonspacing	Inherited
◌᪵o	COMBINING X-X BELOW; U+1AB5	X-x	Mn: Mark, nonspacing	Inherited
◌᪶o	COMBINING WIGGLY LINE BELOW; U+1AB6	Wiggly line	Mn: Mark, nonspacing	Inherited
◌᪷o	COMBINING OPEN MARK BELOW; U+1AB7	Open mark	Mn: Mark, nonspacing	Inherited
◌᪸o	COMBINING DOUBLE OPEN MARK BELOW; U+1AB8	Double open mark	Mn: Mark, nonspacing	Inherited
◌᪹o	COMBINING LIGHT CENTRALIZATION STROKE BELOW; U+1AB9	Light centralization stroke	Mn: Mark, nonspacing	Inherited
◌᪺o	COMBINING STRONG CENTRALIZATION STROKE BELOW; U+1ABA	Strong centralization stroke	Mn: Mark, nonspacing	Inherited
◌᪻o	COMBINING PARENTHESES ABOVE; U+1ABB	Parentheses	Mn: Mark, nonspacing	Inherited
◌᪼o	COMBINING DOUBLE PARENTHESES ABOVE; U+1ABC	Double parentheses	Mn: Mark, nonspacing	Inherited
◌᪽o	COMBINING PARENTHESES BELOW; U+1ABD	Parentheses	Mn: Mark, nonspacing	Inherited
◌ᪿo	COMBINING LATIN SMALL LETTER W BELOW; U+1ABF	Latin small letter w	Mn: Mark, nonspacing	Inherited
◌ᫀo	COMBINING LATIN SMALL LETTER TURNED W BELOW; U+1AC0	Latin small letter turned w	Mn: Mark, nonspacing	Inherited
◌᷀o	COMBINING DOTTED GRAVE ACCENT; U+1DC0	Dotted grave	Mn: Mark, nonspacing	Inherited
◌᷁o	COMBINING DOTTED ACUTE ACCENT; U+1DC1	Dotted acute	Mn: Mark, nonspacing	Inherited
◌᷂o	COMBINING SNAKE BELOW; U+1DC2	Snake	Mn: Mark, nonspacing	Inherited
◌᷃o	COMBINING SUSPENSION MARK; U+1DC3	Suspension mark	Mn: Mark, nonspacing	Inherited
◌᷄o	COMBINING MACRON-ACUTE; U+1DC4	Macron-acute	Mn: Mark, nonspacing	Inherited
◌᷅o	COMBINING GRAVE-MACRON; U+1DC5	Grave-macron	Mn: Mark, nonspacing	Inherited
◌᷆o	COMBINING MACRON-GRAVE; U+1DC6	Macron-grave	Mn: Mark, nonspacing	Inherited
◌᷇o	COMBINING ACUTE-MACRON; U+1DC7	Acute-macron	Mn: Mark, nonspacing	Inherited
◌᷈o	COMBINING GRAVE-ACUTE-GRAVE; U+1DC8	Grave-acute-grave	Mn: Mark, nonspacing	Inherited
◌᷉o	COMBINING ACUTE-GRAVE-ACUTE; U+1DC9	Acute-grave-acute	Mn: Mark, nonspacing	Inherited
◌᷊o	COMBINING LATIN SMALL LETTER R BELOW; U+1DCA	Latin small letter r	Mn: Mark, nonspacing	Inherited
◌᷋o	COMBINING BREVE-MACRON; U+1DCB	Breve-macron	Mn: Mark, nonspacing	Inherited
◌᷌o	COMBINING MACRON-BREVE; U+1DCC	Macron-breve	Mn: Mark, nonspacing	Inherited
◌᷍◌o	COMBINING DOUBLE CIRCUMFLEX ABOVE; U+1DCD	Double circumflex	Mn: Mark, nonspacing	Inherited
◌᷎o	COMBINING OGONEK ABOVE; U+1DCE	Ogonek	Mn: Mark, nonspacing	Inherited
◌᷏o	COMBINING ZIGZAG BELOW; U+1DCF	Zigzag	Mn: Mark, nonspacing	Inherited
◌᷐o	COMBINING IS BELOW; U+1DD0	Is	Mn: Mark, nonspacing	Inherited
◌᷑o	COMBINING UR ABOVE; U+1DD1	Ur	Mn: Mark, nonspacing	Inherited
◌᷒o	COMBINING US ABOVE; U+1DD2	Us	Mn: Mark, nonspacing	Inherited
◌ᷓo	COMBINING LATIN SMALL LETTER FLATTENED OPEN A ABOVE; U+1DD3	Latin small letter flattened open a	Mn: Mark, nonspacing	Inherited
◌ᷔo	COMBINING LATIN SMALL LETTER AE; U+1DD4	Latin small letter ae	Mn: Mark, nonspacing	Inherited
◌ᷕo	COMBINING LATIN SMALL LETTER AO; U+1DD5	Latin small letter ao	Mn: Mark, nonspacing	Inherited
◌ᷖo	COMBINING LATIN SMALL LETTER AV; U+1DD6	Latin small letter av	Mn: Mark, nonspacing	Inherited
◌ᷗo	COMBINING LATIN SMALL LETTER C CEDILLA; U+1DD7	Latin small letter c cedilla	Mn: Mark, nonspacing	Inherited
◌ᷘo	COMBINING LATIN SMALL LETTER INSULAR D; U+1DD8	Latin small letter insular d	Mn: Mark, nonspacing	Inherited
◌ᷙo	COMBINING LATIN SMALL LETTER ETH; U+1DD9	Latin small letter eth	Mn: Mark, nonspacing	Inherited
◌ᷚo	COMBINING LATIN SMALL LETTER G; U+1DDA	Latin small letter g	Mn: Mark, nonspacing	Inherited
◌ᷛo	COMBINING LATIN LETTER SMALL CAPITAL G; U+1DDB	Latin letter small capital g	Mn: Mark, nonspacing	Inherited
◌ᷜo	COMBINING LATIN SMALL LETTER K; U+1DDC	Latin small letter k	Mn: Mark, nonspacing	Inherited
◌ᷝo	COMBINING LATIN SMALL LETTER L; U+1DDD	Latin small letter l	Mn: Mark, nonspacing	Inherited
◌ᷞo	COMBINING LATIN LETTER SMALL CAPITAL L; U+1DDE	Latin letter small capital l	Mn: Mark, nonspacing	Inherited
◌ᷟo	COMBINING LATIN LETTER SMALL CAPITAL M; U+1DDF	Latin letter small capital m	Mn: Mark, nonspacing	Inherited
◌ᷠo	COMBINING LATIN SMALL LETTER N; U+1DE0	Latin small letter n	Mn: Mark, nonspacing	Inherited
◌ᷡo	COMBINING LATIN LETTER SMALL CAPITAL N; U+1DE1	Latin letter small capital n	Mn: Mark, nonspacing	Inherited
◌ᷢo	COMBINING LATIN LETTER SMALL CAPITAL R; U+1DE2	Latin letter small capital r	Mn: Mark, nonspacing	Inherited
◌ᷣo	COMBINING LATIN SMALL LETTER R ROTUNDA; U+1DE3	Latin small letter r rotunda	Mn: Mark, nonspacing	Inherited
◌ᷤo	COMBINING LATIN SMALL LETTER S; U+1DE4	Latin small letter s	Mn: Mark, nonspacing	Inherited
◌ᷥo	COMBINING LATIN SMALL LETTER LONG S; U+1DE5	Latin small letter long s	Mn: Mark, nonspacing	Inherited
◌ᷦo	COMBINING LATIN SMALL LETTER Z; U+1DE6	Latin small letter z	Mn: Mark, nonspacing	Inherited
◌ᷧo	COMBINING LATIN SMALL LETTER ALPHA; U+1DE7	Latin small letter alpha	Mn: Mark, nonspacing	Inherited
◌ᷨo	COMBINING LATIN SMALL LETTER B; U+1DE8	Latin small letter b	Mn: Mark, nonspacing	Inherited
◌ᷩo	COMBINING LATIN SMALL LETTER BETA; U+1DE9	Latin small letter beta	Mn: Mark, nonspacing	Inherited
◌ᷪo	COMBINING LATIN SMALL LETTER SCHWA; U+1DEA	Latin small letter schwa	Mn: Mark, nonspacing	Inherited
◌ᷫo	COMBINING LATIN SMALL LETTER F; U+1DEB	Latin small letter f	Mn: Mark, nonspacing	Inherited
◌ᷬo	COMBINING LATIN SMALL LETTER L WITH DOUBLE MIDDLE TILDE; U+1DEC	Latin small letter l with double middle tilde	Mn: Mark, nonspacing	Inherited
◌ᷭo	COMBINING LATIN SMALL LETTER O WITH LIGHT CENTRALIZATION STROKE; U+1DED	Latin small letter o with light centralization stroke	Mn: Mark, nonspacing	Inherited
◌ᷮo	COMBINING LATIN SMALL LETTER P; U+1DEE	Latin small letter p	Mn: Mark, nonspacing	Inherited
◌ᷯo	COMBINING LATIN SMALL LETTER ESH; U+1DEF	Latin small letter esh	Mn: Mark, nonspacing	Inherited
◌ᷰo	COMBINING LATIN SMALL LETTER U WITH LIGHT CENTRALIZATION STROKE; U+1DF0	Latin small letter u with light centralization stroke	Mn: Mark, nonspacing	Inherited
◌ᷱo	COMBINING LATIN SMALL LETTER W; U+1DF1	Latin small letter w	Mn: Mark, nonspacing	Inherited
◌ᷲo	COMBINING LATIN SMALL LETTER A WITH DIAERESIS; U+1DF2	Latin small letter a with diaeresis	Mn: Mark, nonspacing	Inherited
◌ᷳo	COMBINING LATIN SMALL LETTER O WITH DIAERESIS; U+1DF3	Latin small letter o with diaeresis	Mn: Mark, nonspacing	Inherited
◌ᷴo	COMBINING LATIN SMALL LETTER U WITH DIAERESIS; U+1DF4	Latin small letter u with diaeresis	Mn: Mark, nonspacing	Inherited
◌᷵o	COMBINING UP TACK ABOVE; U+1DF5	Up tack	Mn: Mark, nonspacing	Inherited
◌᷸o	COMBINING DOT ABOVE LEFT; U+1DF8	Dot left	Mn: Mark, nonspacing	Inherited
◌᷹o	COMBINING WIDE INVERTED BRIDGE BELOW; U+1DF9	Wide inverted bridge	Mn: Mark, nonspacing	Inherited
◌᷻o	COMBINING DELETION MARK; U+1DFB	Deletion mark	Mn: Mark, nonspacing	Inherited
◌᷼◌o	COMBINING DOUBLE INVERTED BREVE BELOW; U+1DFC	Double inverted breve	Mn: Mark, nonspacing	Inherited
◌᷽o	COMBINING ALMOST EQUAL TO BELOW; U+1DFD	Almost equal to	Mn: Mark, nonspacing	Inherited
◌᷾o	COMBINING LEFT ARROWHEAD ABOVE; U+1DFE	Left arrowhead	Mn: Mark, nonspacing	Inherited
◌᷿o	COMBINING RIGHT ARROWHEAD AND DOWN ARROWHEAD BELOW; U+1DFF	Right arrowhead and down arrowhead	Mn: Mark, nonspacing	Inherited
◌⃐◌o	COMBINING LEFT HARPOON ABOVE; U+20D0	Left harpoon	Mn: Mark, nonspacing	Inherited
◌⃑◌o	COMBINING RIGHT HARPOON ABOVE; U+20D1	Right harpoon	Mn: Mark, nonspacing	Inherited
◌⃒o	COMBINING LONG VERTICAL LINE OVERLAY; U+20D2	Long vertical line overlay	Mn: Mark, nonspacing	Inherited
◌⃓o	COMBINING SHORT VERTICAL LINE OVERLAY; U+20D3	Short vertical line overlay	Mn: Mark, nonspacing	Inherited
◌⃔◌o	COMBINING ANTICLOCKWISE ARROW ABOVE; U+20D4	Anticlockwise arrow	Mn: Mark, nonspacing	Inherited
◌⃕◌o	COMBINING CLOCKWISE ARROW ABOVE; U+20D5	Clockwise arrow	Mn: Mark, nonspacing	Inherited
◌⃖◌o	COMBINING LEFT ARROW ABOVE; U+20D6	Left arrow	Mn: Mark, nonspacing	Inherited
◌⃗◌o	COMBINING RIGHT ARROW ABOVE; U+20D7	Right arrow	Mn: Mark, nonspacing	Inherited
◌⃘o	COMBINING RING OVERLAY; U+20D8	Ring overlay	Mn: Mark, nonspacing	Inherited
◌⃙o	COMBINING CLOCKWISE RING OVERLAY; U+20D9	Clockwise ring overlay	Mn: Mark, nonspacing	Inherited
◌⃚o	COMBINING ANTICLOCKWISE RING OVERLAY; U+20DA	Anticlockwise ring overlay	Mn: Mark, nonspacing	Inherited
◌⃛◌o	COMBINING THREE DOTS ABOVE; U+20DB	Three dots	Mn: Mark, nonspacing	Inherited
◌⃜◌o	COMBINING FOUR DOTS ABOVE; U+20DC	Four dots	Mn: Mark, nonspacing	Inherited
◌⃡◌o	COMBINING LEFT RIGHT ARROW ABOVE; U+20E1	Left right arrow	Mn: Mark, nonspacing	Inherited
◌⃥o	COMBINING REVERSE SOLIDUS OVERLAY; U+20E5	Reverse solidus overlay	Mn: Mark, nonspacing	Inherited
◌⃦o	COMBINING DOUBLE VERTICAL STROKE OVERLAY; U+20E6	Double vertical stroke overlay	Mn: Mark, nonspacing	Inherited
◌⃧o	COMBINING ANNUITY SYMBOL; U+20E7	Annuity symbol	Mn: Mark, nonspacing	Inherited
◌⃨o	COMBINING TRIPLE UNDERDOT; U+20E8	Triple underdot	Mn: Mark, nonspacing	Inherited
◌⃩◌o	COMBINING WIDE BRIDGE ABOVE; U+20E9	Wide bridge	Mn: Mark, nonspacing	Inherited
◌⃪o	COMBINING LEFTWARDS ARROW OVERLAY; U+20EA	Leftwards arrow overlay	Mn: Mark, nonspacing	Inherited
◌⃫o	COMBINING LONG DOUBLE SOLIDUS OVERLAY; U+20EB	Long double solidus overlay	Mn: Mark, nonspacing	Inherited
◌⃬o	COMBINING RIGHTWARDS HARPOON WITH BARB DOWNWARDS; U+20EC	Rightwards harpoon with barb downwards	Mn: Mark, nonspacing	Inherited
◌⃭o	COMBINING LEFTWARDS HARPOON WITH BARB DOWNWARDS; U+20ED	Leftwards harpoon with barb downwards	Mn: Mark, nonspacing	Inherited
◌⃮o	COMBINING LEFT ARROW BELOW; U+20EE	Left arrow	Mn: Mark, nonspacing	Inherited
◌⃯o	COMBINING RIGHT ARROW BELOW; U+20EF	Right arrow	Mn: Mark, nonspacing	Inherited
◌⃰◌o	COMBINING ASTERISK ABOVE; U+20F0	Asterisk	Mn: Mark, nonspacing	Inherited
◌︠o	COMBINING LIGATURE LEFT HALF; U+FE20	Ligature left half	Mn: Mark, nonspacing	Inherited
◌︡o	COMBINING LIGATURE RIGHT HALF; U+FE21	Ligature right half	Mn: Mark, nonspacing	Inherited
◌︢o	COMBINING DOUBLE TILDE LEFT HALF; U+FE22	Double tilde left half	Mn: Mark, nonspacing	Inherited
◌︣o	COMBINING DOUBLE TILDE RIGHT HALF; U+FE23	Double tilde right half	Mn: Mark, nonspacing	Inherited
◌︤o	COMBINING MACRON LEFT HALF; U+FE24	Macron left half	Mn: Mark, nonspacing	Inherited
◌︥o	COMBINING MACRON RIGHT HALF; U+FE25	Macron right half	Mn: Mark, nonspacing	Inherited
◌︦◌o	COMBINING CONJOINING MACRON; U+FE26	Conjoining macron	Mn: Mark, nonspacing	Inherited
◌︧o	COMBINING LIGATURE LEFT HALF BELOW; U+FE27	Ligature left half	Mn: Mark, nonspacing	Inherited
◌︨o	COMBINING LIGATURE RIGHT HALF BELOW; U+FE28	Ligature right half	Mn: Mark, nonspacing	Inherited
◌︩o	COMBINING TILDE LEFT HALF BELOW; U+FE29	Tilde left half	Mn: Mark, nonspacing	Inherited
◌︪o	COMBINING TILDE RIGHT HALF BELOW; U+FE2A	Tilde right half	Mn: Mark, nonspacing	Inherited
◌︫o	COMBINING MACRON LEFT HALF BELOW; U+FE2B	Macron left half	Mn: Mark, nonspacing	Inherited
◌︬o	COMBINING MACRON RIGHT HALF BELOW; U+FE2C	Macron right half	Mn: Mark, nonspacing	Inherited
◌︭o	COMBINING CONJOINING MACRON BELOW; U+FE2D	Conjoining macron	Mn: Mark, nonspacing	Inherited

== See also ==
- Latin-script alphabets
- Alt code
- Category:Letters with diacritics
- Collating sequence
- Combining character
- Compose key
- English terms with diacritical marks
- Heavy metal umlaut
- ISO/IEC 8859 8-bit extended-Latin-alphabet European character encodings
- Latin alphabet
- List of Latin letters
- List of precomposed Latin characters in Unicode
- List of U.S. cities with diacritics
- Romanization
