= Turkish I =

Turkish I may refer to:

- Dotless I
- Dotted I
