= Ekşi Sözlük =

Dictionary-based social networking service

- "Kutsal Bilgi Kaynağı (The Sacred Source Of Knowledge)"

- Screenshot of the page showing the topic "vikipedi" as of 2023.
- Website type: Online dictionary, social networking service
- Available in: Turkish
- Owner: Ekşi Teknoloji ve Bilişim A.Ş.
- Founder: Sedat Kapanoğlu (known as "ssg" in the website)
- Website: eksisozluk.com
- Commercial: Website and Mobile App
- Registration: Required for posting and voting, not required for viewing
- Launched: 15 February 1999; 27 years ago
- Current status: Active

Ekşi Sözlük (Turkish pronunciation: [ecˈʃi sœzˈlyc], lit. 'sour dictionary', stylized as ekşi sözlük) is a Turkish collaborative hypertext dictionary, a type of social network based on dictionaries. It is one of the largest online communities in Turkey and one of the oldest Turkish websites still in operation. Despite its name, Ekşi Sözlük is not strictly a dictionary, as users are not required to write correct information. As an online public sphere, Ekşi Sözlük is utilized by users for sharing information on a wide variety of topics, ranging from scientific subjects to everyday life issues, and as a virtual socio-political community to communicate disputed political content and to share personal views.

== History ==
Ekşi Sözlük was launched by self-taught coder Sedat Kapanoğlu in 1999, for humorous information sharing and communicating with his friends, as he was inspired by The Hitchhiker's Guide to the Galaxy. When it was launched, Ekşi Sözlük was an interactive, user-generated dictionary part of a satire website sourtimes.org which was named after the Portishead song "Sour Times", and it was named "Ekşi (Sour)" for this reason.

The oldest topic and entry on Ekşi Sözlük are about picks. The entry is short, consisting of a single definition: "the tiny, plastic, strange object used for playing guitar."

Former logo of Ekşi Sözlük, used from early 2000s to 2016.

Ekşi Sözlük has been successful, many other websites that use this concept has emerged, like İTÜ Sözlük in Turkish. Turkish sociologist Zeynep Tüfekçi says it is like "Wikipedia, a social network and Reddit rolled into one".

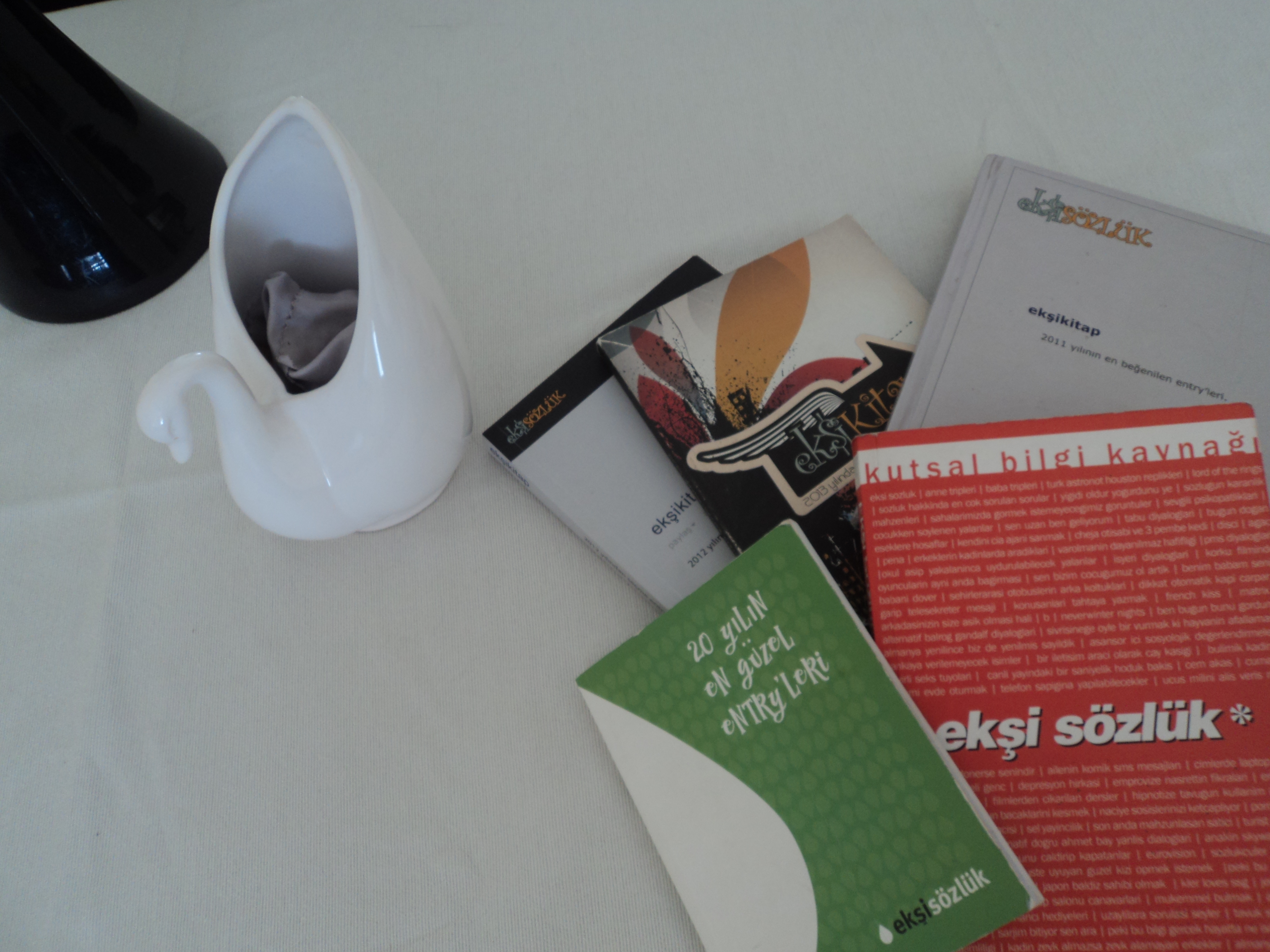
Many merchandises of Ekşi Sözlük are printed publications such as books and magazines. The image shows some books from a fan's collection. The books include entries compiled from the site.

On February 21, 2023, access to the website was blocked in Turkey by the Information and Communication Technologies Authority of Turkey. On March 2, 2023, the 4th Ankara Criminal Court of Peace decided to remove the access barrier, but the decision was reversed by a higher court and it remained blocked until January 22, 2024. According to Duvar, the website was blocked due to posts relating to the earthquakes in Turkey, and a journalist claimed that the block was requested by the presidency.

== Rules and structure ==
Enrollment periods to the dictionary and the criteria of acceptance are changeable. Ekşi Sözlük does not accept new authors continuously; there are specific times in which new authors are accepted. There is a waiting period for new members who want to become authors in which they must post at least 10 entries. All entries are inspected according to the dictionary rules and their quality, and if they pass inspection, the new user becomes an author. However, this process might take from months to years.

Titles are limited to 50 characters in length. Entries have no length limit.

Newcomer, Newcomer awaiting approval, Registered reader, Praetors, and Hacıvat are some of the user roles in Ekşi Sözlük.

Since there are no practical (Note: There are a few policies on the website governing how an entry should be structured. They are not strictly enforced.) restrictions on entries, moderators and informers are responsible for catching and deleting any inappropriate entry. Informers are usually the older generation authors who voluntarily report any bad content to moderators for examination. If the moderators find the entries inappropriate, they are deleted.

Site statistics are updated on a daily basis. There are 300 to 400 posts on average for each author. More than half of the authors are at the age of 18–25 and the number of male users is two times more than that of female ones.

No capital letters are allowed in the posts. This prevents all-caps shouting and technical issues involving the correct casing of i/ı(in Turkish, I and i are considered 2 different letters although İ /ı use the same lowercase and uppercase form respectively).

== Mobile application ==
An official application for Ekşi Sözlük has been released in 2017 for iOS and Android platforms.

== See also ==
- Internet censorship in Turkey
