= Tarafım =

Regional anthem of Gagauzia, Moldova

English: My Motherland
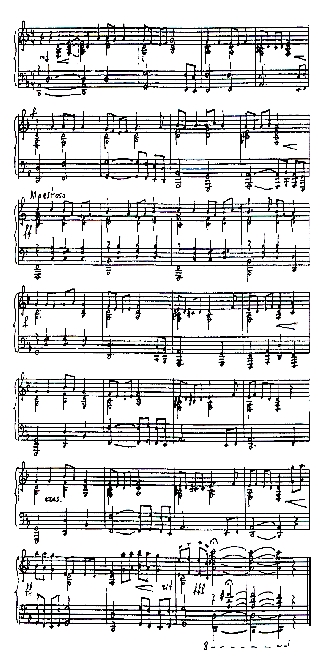
- Sheet music
- Regional anthem of Gagauzia, Moldova
- Lyrics: Mina Kösä
- Music: Mihail Colsa, 1995
- Adopted: 1999

Audio sample
- Digital instrumental version in D minor: file; help

"Tarafım" (pronounced [taraˈfɨm]; lit. 'My Motherland') is the regional anthem of Gagauzia, an autonomous region of Moldova. It was composed by Mihail Colsa in 1995, and the lyrics were written by Mina Kosä. It was officially adopted by the People's Assembly of Gagauzia in 1999.

== Lyrics ==
=== Gagauz original ===
Latin script

I
Tarafım, sän tarafım,
Ne gözelsin, korafım:
Çok comertsin sän, topraam,
Gagauz Yerim, Bucaam!

Tekrar:
Gagauziya — hoşluum,
Çok sevin, koru dostluu,
Bayraanı üüsek kaldır,
Sän benim paalı halkım!

II
İIk adım sendi yaptık,
Hem ana da biz dedik,
Kauşu sevdik dinmäz,
«Oglanı» çaldık bitmäz.

Tekrar

III
Gagauziya, mutlu yerim,
Vatanımsın sän benim,
Pek işçidir insanın,
Yelleri keser altın.

Tekrar

IV
Ne zorluk seni kırdı,
Ne zaman dolaştırdı.
Allahım, koru topraa:
Gagauz Yeri, Bucaa!

Tekrar

Cyrillic script

I
Тарафым, сӓн тарафым,
Не гӧзелсин, корафым:
Чок ӂомертсин сӓн, топраам,
Гагауз Ерим, Буӂаам!

Текрар:
Гагаузия — хошлуум,
Чок севин, кору достлуу,
Байрааны ӱӱсек калдыр,
Сӓн беним паалы халкым!

II
Илк адым сенди йаптык,
Хем ана да биз дедик,
Каушу севдик динмӓз,
«Огланы» чалдык битмӓз.

Текрар

III
Гагаузия, мутлу ерим,
Ватанымсын сӓн беним,
Пек ишчидир инсанын,
Еллери кесер алтын.

Текрар

IV
Не зорлук сени кырды,
Не заман долаштырды.
Аллахым, кору топраа:
Гагауз Ери, Буӂаа!

Текрар

IPA transcription (Note: See Help:IPA/Gagauz, Gagauz language § Phonology and Gagauz alphabet.)

1
[ta.raˈfɨm sʲænʲ ta.raˈfɨm |]
[nʲe ɡʲøˈzʲelʲ.sʲinʲ ko.raˈfɨm |]
[tʃok dʒoˈmʲerʲtʲ.sʲinʲ sʲænʲ topˈraːm |]
[ga.gaˈuz jeˈrʲimʲ buˈdʒaːm ‖]

[tʲekʲˈrar]
[ga.gaˈu.zʲi.ja xoʃˈɫuːm |]
[tʃok sʲeˈvʲinʲ koˈru dostˈɫuː |]
[baj.raːˈnɨ jyːˈsʲekʲ ˈkaɫ.dɨr |]
[sʲænʲ bʲeˈnʲimʲ paːˈɫɨ xaɫˈkɨm ǁ]

2
[ilʲkʲ aˈdɨm sʲenʲˈdʲi japˈtɨk |]
[xʲemʲ aˈna da bʲizʲ dʲeˈdʲikʲ |]
[ka.uˈʃu sʲevʲˈdʲikʲ dʲinʲˈmʲæzʲ |]
[og.ɫaˈnɨ tʃaɫˈdɨk bʲitʲˈmʲæzʲ ǁ]

[tʲekʲˈrar]

3
[ga.gaˈu.zʲi.ja | mutˈɫu jeˈrʲimʲ |]
[va.taˈnɨm.sɨn sʲænʲ bʲeˈnʲimʲ |]
[pʲekʲ iʃˈtʃʲi.dʲirʲ inʲ.saˈnɨn |]
[jelʲ.lʲeˈrʲi kʲeˈsʲerʲ aɫˈtɨn ‖]

[tʲekʲˈrar]

4
[nʲe zorˈɫuk sʲeˈnʲi kɨrˈnɨ |]
[nʲe zaˈman doˈɫaʃ.tɨr.dɨ ‖]
[aɫ.ɫaˈhɨm koˈru topˈraː |]
[ga.gaˈuz jeˈrʲi buˈdʒaː ‖]

[tʲekʲˈrar]

=== Russian translation ===
Cyrillic script

I
Край родной — Буджакский Край!
Краше всех — Ты, словно Рай!
Как щедра твоя Земля —
Гагаузия моя!

Припев:
Гагаузия живи!
Дружбу, мир народ храни!
Знамя выше Ты держи,
И Землёю дорожи!

II
Здесь мы начали ходить,
Слово «Мама» говорить.
В кауша влюбились звук,
И «Оглана» спели вслух.

Припев

III
Гагаузская Земля —
Это Родина моя!
Как народ трудолюбив —
Золотом — руками жив!

Припев

IV
Не смогли сломить Тебя,
И ни время, ни беда.
Пусть Господь хранит тебя —
Гагаузия моя!

Припев

Latin script

I
Kraj rodnoj — Budžakskij Kraj!
Kraše vseh — Ty, slovno Raj!
Kak ščedra tvoja Zemlja —
Gagauzija moja!

Pripev:
Gagauzija živi!
Družbu, mir narod hrani!
Znamja vyše Ty derži,
I Zemljoju doroži!

II
Zdesj my načali hoditj,
Slovo «Mama» govoritj.
V kauša vljubilisj zvuk,
I «Oglana» speli vsluh.

Pripev

III
Gagauzskaja Zemlja —
Eto Rodina moja!
Kak narod trudoljubiv —
Zolotom — rukami živ!

Pripev

IV
Ne smogli slomitj Tebja,
I ni vremja, ni beda.
Pustj Gospodj hranit tebja —
Gagauzija moja!

Pripev

=== English translation ===
I

Motherland, my motherland,

How gorgeous are thy forests.

And how fertile is thy soil,

Gagauzia, my budjak!

Chorus:

Gagauzia, my beloved,

May bliss, friendship be guarded.

Raise thy flag high in the air,

My nation cherished and dear!

II

We came into being through thee,

And we all called thee mother.

Boundless is our love for thee,

A never-ending melody.

Chorus

III

Gagauzia, land beloved,

Thou art my motherland.

Industrious are thy folk,

Their hands turn labour into gold.

Chorus

IV

Hardships could not break thee,

Thou'st withstood the tests of time.

May God our home defend,

Gagauzia, my homeland!

Chorus
