= Dotted and dotless I in computing =

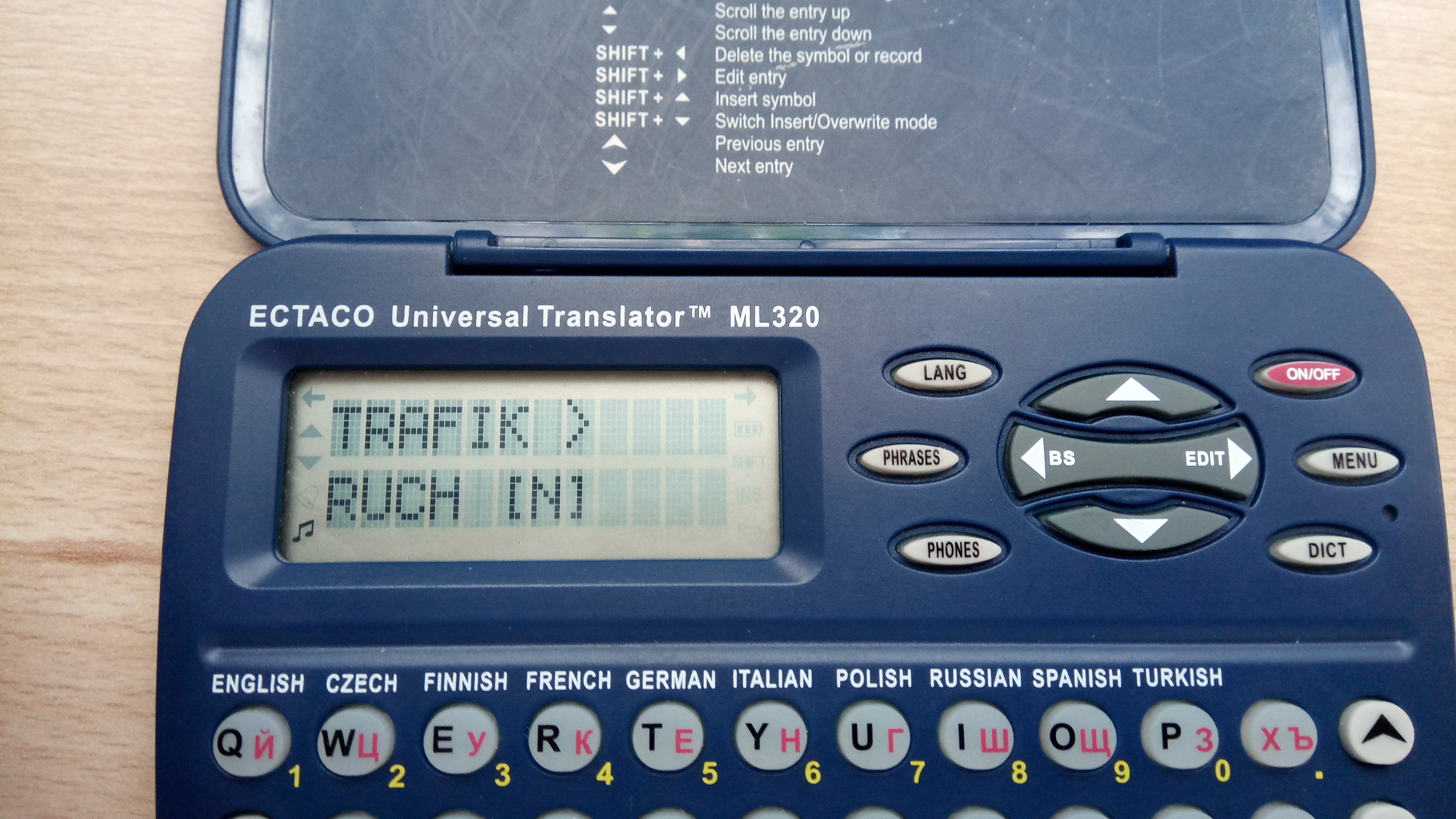
Error when displaying dotted İ as a dotless I while translating from Turkish to Polish (the translated word should be displayed as TRAFİK)

The Latin-derived letters dotted İ i and dotless I ı, which are distinct letters in the alphabets of a number of Turkic languages, unlike in English and most languages using the Latin script, have caused some issues in computing due to i capitalizing as I in most languages, but capitalizing into İ in Turkish; and vice versa.

== Difficulties ==
Unicode does not encode the uppercase form of dotless I and lowercase form of dotted İ separately from their base letters, and instead merges them with the upper and lower case forms of the Latin letter I respectively. John Cowan proposed disunification of plain Ii as capital letter dotless I and small letter I with dot above to make the casing more consistent. The Unicode Technical Committee had previously rejected a similar proposal because it would corrupt mapping from character sets with dotted and dotless I and corrupt data in these languages.

Most Unicode software uppercases ı to I, but, unless specifically configured for Turkish, it lowercases I to i. Thus uppercasing then lowercasing changes the letters, preventing round-trip format conversion. Likewise, most Unicode software uppercases i to I, changing the letter in the process.

In the Microsoft Windows SDK, beginning with Windows Vista, several relevant functions have a NORM_LINGUISTIC_CASING flag, to indicate that for Turkish and Azerbaijani locales, I should map to ı.

In the LaTeX typesetting language the dotless ı can be written with the backslash-i command: \i.

Dotted İ and dotless ı are problematic in the Turkish locales of several software packages, including Oracle DBMS, PHP, Java (software platform), and Unixware 7, where implicit capitalization of names of keywords, variables, and tables has effects not foreseen by the application developers. The C or US English locales do not have these problems. The .NET Framework has special provisions to handle the "Turkish i".

Many cellphones available in Turkey (as of 2008) lacked a proper localization, which led to replacing ı by i in SMS, sometimes severely distorting the sense of a text. In one instance, a miscommunication played a role in the deaths of Emine and Ramazan Çalçoban in 2008. A common substitution is to use the character 1 for dotless ı. This is also common in Azerbaijan (see also translit), but the meaning of words is generally understood.

In some Ectaco translators, the letter İ was also treated as I (e.g. *TRAFIK ⟨traffic⟩, when it is normally TRAFİK).

== Unicode ==
- U+0049 I LATIN CAPITAL LETTER I
- U+0069 i LATIN SMALL LETTER I
- U+0130 İ LATIN CAPITAL LETTER I WITH DOT ABOVE
- U+0131 ı LATIN SMALL LETTER DOTLESS I

== See also ==
- African Reference Alphabet, where a similar situation occurs, albeit with the serifs rather than the tittles.
