= Gagauz alphabet =

Writing systems for the Gagauz language

The modern Gagauz alphabet is a 31-letter Latin-based alphabet modelled on the Turkish alphabet and Azerbaijani. It is used to write the Gagauz language.

During its existence, it has functioned on different graphic bases and has been repeatedly reformed. Previously, during Soviet rule, Gagauz's official script was Cyrillic, close to the Moldovan Cyrillic alphabet.

There are 3 stages in the history of Gagauz writing:

- before 1957 – early attempts to create writing;
- 1957–1993 – writing based on the Cyrillic alphabet;
- since 1993 – modern writing based on the Latin alphabet.

== History ==
=== Early experiences ===
Gagauz was first written in Greek letters in the late 19th century. Orientalist Otto Blau claims that one of the first instances of written Gagauz was with plays of Euripides being translated into the Gagauz language and written with Greek letters.

The first specimens of Gagauz were collected by the Russian ethnographer Valentin Moshkov, who collected folklore texts from the Gagauz in Bessarabia, published in 1904. Until that time, up to the establishment of Gagauz as one of the official languages of the Soviet Union in 1957, the priest Mihail Ciachir was the only native speaker to attempt to write in Gagauz. His products were, for the most part, translations of religious texts but were also a history of the Gagauz people, which he first wrote in Romanian and subsequently translated into Gagauz. From 1909 to 1914, Ciachir wrote Gagauz in Cyrillic script but from 1932 to 1938, he wrote in Latin script.

The alphabet of these editions contained the letters:

a, â, ă, b, c, d, e, f, g, h, i, î, j, l, m, n, o, p, r, s, ş, t, ţ, u, v, ƶ, as well as di-, tri- and tetragraphs: aa, ââ, ee, ea, eaea, ii, ia, îa, ăă, io, ioio, iu, iuiu, oo, uu, ce, cea, ci, cia, cio, ciu, dj

=== Cyrillic alphabet ===
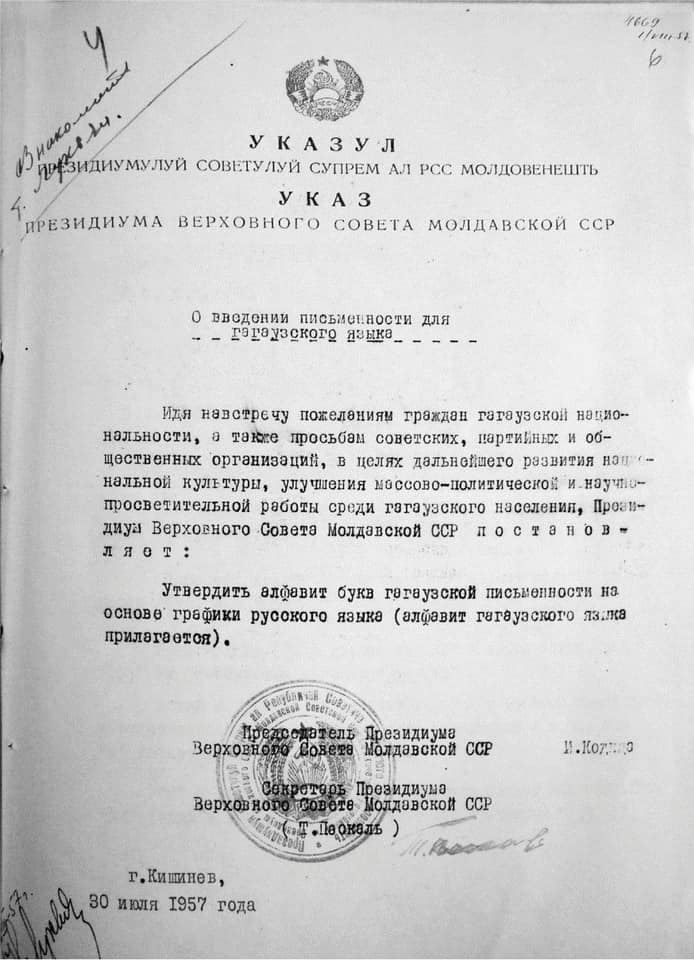
Decree on the introduction of writing for the Gagauz language. July 30, 1957.

Beginning in 1957, Cyrillic was used until 1993.

The Gagauz alphabet based on the Cyrillic alphabet was introduced by a decree of the Presidium of the Supreme Soviet of the Moldavian SSR dated July 30, 1957. Initially, the Gagauz alphabet was compiled on the basis of the Russian alphabet without additional letters for individual Gagauz sounds, which were indicated by digraphs: Аь аь, Оь оь, Уь уь. In December of the same year, instead of digraphs, three additional letters were added to the Gagauz alphabet: Ӓ ä, Ӧ ö, Ӱ ÿ. In 1968, the letter Ӂ ӂ was added to the Gagauz alphabet. As a result, the Gagauz Cyrillic alphabet took the following form:

А а	Ӓ ӓ	Б б	В в	Г г	Д д	Е е	**Ё** **ё**
Ж ж	Ӂ ӂ	З з	И и	Й й	К к	Л л	М м
Н н	О о	Ӧ ӧ	П п	Р р	С с	Т т	У у
Ӱ ӱ	Ф ф	Х х	Ц ц	Ч ч	Ш ш	**Щ щ**	**Ъ ъ**
Ы ы	**Ь ь**	Э э	**Ю ю**	**Я я**

The letters in bold were only used in loanwords.

=== Latin alphabet ===
On 13 May 1993, the parliament of the Republic of Moldova passed a decision providing for the official adoption of a Latin-script alphabet for the Gagauz language. This was subsequently amended in 1996. The official Gagauz alphabet adopted is modelled after the modern Turkish alphabet, with the addition of three letters: ⟨ä⟩ to represent /æ/ (as ⟨ə⟩ in Azerbaijani); ⟨ê⟩ to represent /ə/ (as ⟨ă⟩ in Romanian); and ⟨ţ⟩ to represent /ts/ (as ⟨ț⟩ in Romanian). On the other hand, unlike Crimean Tatar, Turkish, and some other Turkic languages, Gagauz does not have the letter ⟨ğ⟩, which had become completely silent in the Gagauz language. Note that cedillas should be used instead of commas for Ç, Ş, and Ţ for consistency, since C with comma does not exist in Romanian and Turkish uses cedillas for Ç and Ş, although Ț is often seen.

In their standard order, the letters of the Gagauz alphabet are:

A, Ä, B, C, Ç, D, E, Ê, F, G, H, I, İ, J, K, L, M, N, O, Ö, P, R, S, Ş, T, Ţ, U, Ü, V, Y, Z.

Note that dotted and dotless I are separate letters, each with its own uppercase and lowercase form. I is the capital form of ı, and İ is the capital form of i. The Gagauz alphabet has no q, w or x. Instead, those characters are transliterated into Gagauz as k, v and ks, respectively.

A a	Ä ä	B b	C c	Ç ç	D d	E e	Ê ê
[ä~ɑ]	[ɛ~æ]	[b, bʲ]	[dʒ, dʒʲ~dʑ]	[tʃ, tʃʲ~tɕ]	[d, dʲ]	[e]	[ə~ɤ]
F f	G g	H h	I ı	İ i	J j	K k	L l
[f, fʲ]	[g, gʲ~ɟ]	[x~h, xʲ~ç]	[ɨ~ɯ]	[i~ɪ]	[ʒ, ʒʲ~ʑ]	[k, kʲ~c]	[l, lʲ~ʎ]
M m	N n	O o	Ö ö	P p	R r	S s	Ş ş
[m, mʲ]	[n, nʲ~ɲ]	[o~ɔ]	[ø~œ]	[p, pʲ]	[r~ɾ, rʲ~ɾʲ]	[s, sʲ]	[ʃ, ʃʲ~ɕ]
T t	Ţ ţ	U u	Ü ü	V v	Y y	Z z
[t, tʲ]	[ts, tsʲ]	[u~ʊ]	[y~ʏ]	[v~ʋ, vʲ]	[j]	[z, zʲ]
