= Vowel pointing =

Vowel pointing is the inserting of signs used to indicate vowels in certain alphabets. Examples are:

- Harakat, of Arabic diacritics
- Niqqud, of Hebrew diacritics
- Syriac diacritics
- Tehtar, of Tengwar diacritics
