= Dotless I =

Letter of the Latin alphabet

- I ı

Usage
- Writing system: Latin script
- Type: alphabetic
- Language of origin: Azerbaijani language, Chipewyan language, Crimean Tatar language, Gagauz language, Karakalpak language, Turkish language
- Sound values: [ɯ]; [ɪ]
- In Unicode: U+0049, U+0131

History
- Development: I i: I ı
- Time period: 1928 to present
- Sisters: İ i

Other
- Writing direction: Left-to-Right

I, or ı, called dotless i, is a letter used in the Latin-script alphabets of Azerbaijani, Crimean Tatar, Gagauz, Kazakh, Tatar and Turkish. It commonly represents the close back unrounded vowel /ɯ/, except in Kazakh where it represents the near-close front unrounded vowel /ɪ/. All of the languages it is used in also use its dotted counterpart İ while not using the basic Latin letter I.

In scholarly writing on Turkic languages, ï is sometimes used for /ɯ/.

== In computing ==
- U+0049 I LATIN CAPITAL LETTER I
- U+0131 ı LATIN SMALL LETTER DOTLESS I

See also

- U+0130 İ LATIN CAPITAL LETTER I WITH DOT ABOVE

== Usage in other languages ==
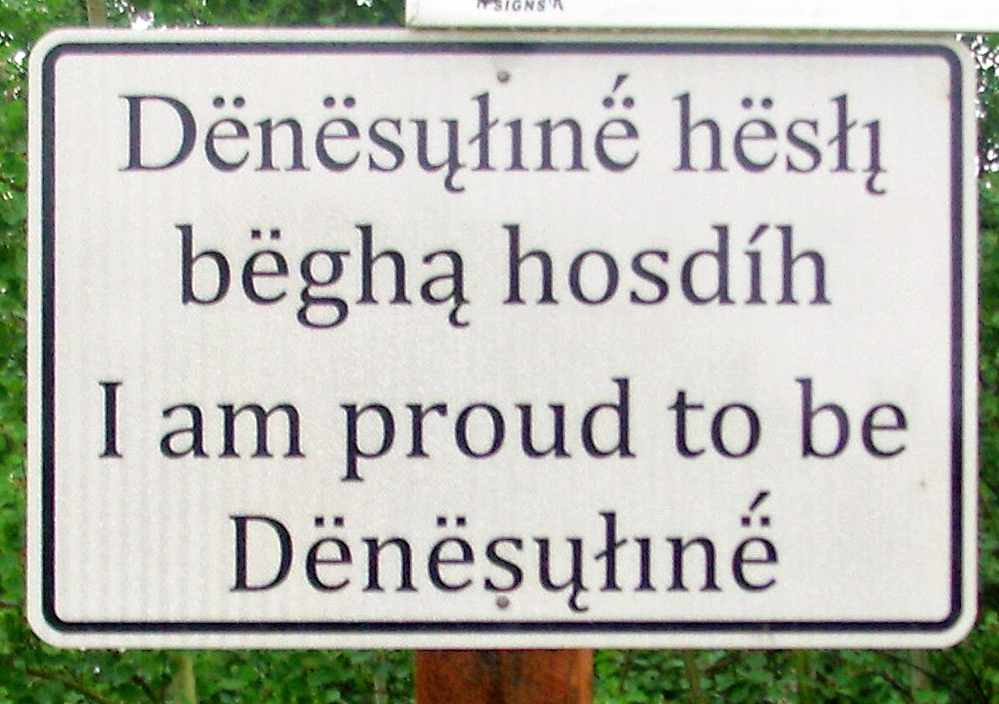
A bilingual Chipewyan (Dënësųłınë́) sign at La Loche Airport in Saskatchewan, Canada, with dotless i.

The dotless ı may also be used as a stylistic variant of the dotted i, without there being any meaningful difference between them.

This is common in older Irish orthography, for example, but is simply the omission of the tittle rather than a separate letter. The í is a separate letter as is ì in Scottish Gaelic. Though historically Irish only used an "i" without a dot, so as to not confuse with "í", this dotless "ı" should not be used for Irish. Instead a font with "i" in the normal location should be used that has no dot. See other old-style Irish letters and the symbol for & still used in modern Irish text and Irish orthography.

In some of the Athabaskan languages of the Northwest Territories in Canada, specifically Slavey, Dogrib and Chipewyan, all instances of i are undotted to avoid confusion with tone-marked vowels í or ì.

Lowercase dotless ı is used as the lowercase form of the letter Í in the official Karakalpak alphabet approved in 2016.

Both the dotted and dotless I can be used in transcriptions of Rusyn to allow distinguishing between the letters Ы and И, which would otherwise be both transcribed as "y", despite representing different phonemes. Under such transcription the dotted İ would represent the Cyrillic І, and the dotless I would represent either Ы or И, with the other being represented by "Y".

== See also ==
- Dotless j
- Yery (ы), a letter used to represent [ɯ] in Turkic languages with Cyrillic script, and the similar [ɨ] in Russian
- I with bowl, a letter that represented [ɯ] in the Latin-based Yañalif alphabet used for the Turkic languages of the former Soviet Union prior to those languages' adoption of Cyrillic
