= İ =

Latin letter I with dot above

I with dot above
- İ i

Usage
- Writing system: Latin script
- Type: alphabetic
- Language of origin: Azerbaijani language, Crimean Tatar language, Turkish language
- Sound values: [i]; [j]; [ɘj]; [əj]
- In Unicode: U+0130, U+0069

History
Development
D36
          - Ιι
            - 𐌉
              - I i
                - İ i
- Time period: 1928 to present
- Sisters: I ı

Other
- Writing direction: Left-to-Right

İ, or i, called dotted I or i-dot, is a letter used in the Latin-script alphabets of Azerbaijani, Crimean Tatar, Gagauz, Kazakh, Tatar, and Turkish. It commonly represents the close front unrounded vowel /i/ except in Kazakh in which it additionally represents the voiced palatal approximant /j/ and the diphthongs /ɘj/ and /əj/. All languages that use it also use its dotless counterpart I, but not the basic Latin letter I.

== In computing ==
The dotted I is encoded into Unicode with the code point U+0130 (U+0069 for the lowercase letter) as part of the Latin Extended-A block.

Character information
Preview	İ		i	
Unicode name	LATIN CAPITAL LETTER; I WITH DOT ABOVE		LATIN SMALL LETTER I	
Encodings	decimal	hex	dec	hex
Unicode	304	U+0130	105	U+0069
UTF-8	196 176	C4 B0	105	69
Numeric character reference	&#304;	&#x130;	&#105;	&#x69;
Named character reference	&Idot;			
ISO 8859-9	221	DD	105	69
ISO 8859-3	169	A9	105	69

=== Issues ===
The dotted and dotless I characters have caused issues in computing. Languages like Turkish have four variants of the letter I (as opposed to two in English). This causes problems when, instead of the original mapping of i to I, Turkish maps i to the new İ, and ı to I, frequently breaking software logic.

== Usage in other languages ==
Both the dotted and dotless I can be used in transcriptions of Rusyn to allow distinguishing between the letters Ы and И, which would otherwise be both transcribed as "y", despite representing different phonemes. Under such transcription the dotted İ would represent the Cyrillic І, and the dotless I would represent either Ы or И, with the other being represented by "Y".

== Diacritics ==
The letter İ can be found with an acute, grave, tilde, ogonek or stroke accent.

Examples:

- i̇́
- i̇̀
- i̇̃
- į̇́
- į̇̃
- 𝼚

== See also ==
- Dotless I, the letter's dotless counterpart
- Tittle – Diacritical mark, the dot of the letters i and j
