= Latin-script alphabet =

Alphabet using Latin letters

A Latin-script alphabet (Latin alphabet or Roman alphabet) is an alphabet that uses letters of the Latin script. The 21-letter archaic Latin alphabet and the 23-letter classical Latin alphabet belong to the oldest of this group. The 26-letter modern Latin alphabet is the newest of this group.

== Encoding ==
The 26-letter ISO basic Latin alphabet (adopted from the earlier ASCII) contains the 26 letters of the English alphabet. To handle the many other alphabets also derived from the classical Latin one, ISO and other telecommunications groups "extended" the ISO basic Latin multiple times in the late 20th century. More recent international standards (e.g. Unicode) include those that achieved ISO adoption.

== Key types of differences ==
Apart from alphabets for modern spoken languages, there exist phonetic alphabets and spelling alphabets in use derived from Latin script letters. Historical languages may also have used (or are now studied using) alphabets that are derived but still distinct from those of classical Latin and their modern forms (if any).

The Latin script was typically slightly altered to function as an alphabet for each different language (or other use), although the main letters are largely the same. A few general classes of alteration cover many particular cases:

- diacritics could be added to existing letters;
- two letters could be fused together into ligatures;
- additional letters could be inserted; or
- pairs or triplets of letters could be treated as units (digraphs and trigraphs).

These often were given a place in the alphabet by defining an alphabetical order or collation sequence, which can vary between languages. Some of the results, especially from just adding diacritics, were not considered distinct letters for this purpose; for example, the French é and the German ö are not listed separately in their respective alphabet sequences. With some alphabets, some altered letters are considered distinct while others are not; for instance, in Spanish, ñ (which indicates a unique phoneme) is listed separately, while á, é, í, ó, ú, and ü (which do not; the first five of these indicate a nonstandard stress-accent placement, while the last forces the pronunciation of a normally-silent letter) are not. Digraphs in some languages may be separately included in the collation sequence (e.g. Hungarian CS, Welsh RH). New letters must be separately included unless collation is not practised.

== Properties ==
=== Letter inventory ===
Coverage of the letters of the ISO basic Latin alphabet can be

- complete
- partial

and additional letters can be

- absent
- present, either as
  - letters with diacritics (e.g. ⟨Å å⟩ in the Danish, Norwegian and Swedish alphabets)
  - ligatures (e. g. ⟨Æ æ⟩ in Danish, Norwegian, and Icelandic)
  - new letter forms (e.g. ⟨Ə ə⟩ in the Azerbaijani alphabet)

=== Grapheme order ===
Most alphabets have the letters of the ISO basic Latin alphabet in the same order as that alphabet.

==== Multigraphs ====
Some alphabets regard digraphs as distinct letters, e.g. the Spanish alphabet from 1803 to 1994 had CH and LL sorted apart from C and L.

==== Diacritics and ligatures ====
Some alphabets sort letters that have diacritics or are ligatures at the end of the alphabet. Examples are the Scandinavian Danish, Norwegian, Swedish, and Finnish alphabets.

==== New letter forms ====
Icelandic sorts a new letter form and a ligature at the end, as well as one letter with diacritic, while others with diacritics are sorted behind the corresponding non-diacritic letter.

=== Grapheme–sound correspondence ===
The phonetic values of graphemes can differ between alphabets.

Sound values of letters of the ISO basic Latin alphabet in IPA and various Latin-script languages
| Lowercase letter to Latin Alphabet | IPA | IPA for Classical Latin Alphabet | IPA for English Alphabet | IPA for French Alphabet (Note: The French alphabet also has letters with 5 diacritics: à, â, ç, é, è, ê, ë, î, ï, ô, ù, û, ü, and ÿ, and 2 ligatures, æ and œ) | IPA for Spanish Alphabet (Note: The Spanish alphabet has letters with diacritics: á, é, í, ó, ú, and ñ (ñ is considered a separate letter)) | IPA for Malay Orthography | IPA for Turkish Alphabet (Note: The Turkish alphabet has additional letters: ç, ğ, ı, ö, ş, ü (all are separate letters)) |
|---|---|---|---|---|---|---|---|
| a | | a, aː | eɪ, æ, ɑː | a | | | |
| b | | b | | | | | |
| c | | k | k, s | | k, θ | t͡ʃ | d͡ʒ |
| d | | d | | | | | |
| e | | e, eː | iː, ɛ | ə, ɛ | e | e, ə | e |
| f | | f | | | | | |
| g | | g | g, d͡ʒ | g, ʒ | g, x | g | g, ɟ |
| h | | h | h, ∅ | (silent) | (silent) | h | |
| i | | i, iː, j | aɪ, ɪ | i | | | |
| j | | (not used) | d͡ʒ | ʒ | x | d͡ʒ | ʒ |
| k | | k | k, ∅ | k | | k, ʔ | k, c |
| l | | l | | | | | l, ɫ |
| m | | m | | | | | |
| n | | n, ŋ | | | | | |
| o | | o, oː | oʊ, ɒ | ɔ, o | o | | |
| p | | p | | | | | |
| q | | k | | | | | (not used) |
| r | | r | ɹ | ʁ | r, ɾ | r | ɾ |
| s | | s | s, z | | s | | |
| t | | t | | | | | |
| u | | (not used) | juː, ʌ, ʊ, uː | y | u | | |
| v | | u, uː, w | v | | b | v | |
| w | | (not used) | w | w, v | w, b | w | (not used) |
| x | | ks | ks, z | ks | ks, s, x | ks | (not used) |
| y | | y, yː | aɪ, iː, ɪ, j | i, j | | j | |
| z | | z | | | θ~s | z | |

== Names of letters ==
Names of letters of the ISO basic Latin alphabet in various Latin-script languages
| Lowercase Latin alphabet | | a | b | c | d | e | f | g | h | i | j | k | l | m | n | o | p | q | r | s | t | u | v | w | x | y | z |
|---|---|---|---|---|---|---|---|---|---|---|---|---|---|---|---|---|---|---|---|---|---|---|---|---|---|---|---|
| Classical Latin | Written (majus) | á | bé | cé | dé | é | ef | gé | há | í | | ká | el | em | en | ó | pé | qv́ | er | es | té | v́ | | —N/a | ix | í graeca | zéta |
| Classical Latin | Written (modern) | ā | bē | cē | dē | ē | ef | gē | hā | ī | | kā | el | em | en | ō | pē | qū | er | es | tē | ū | | —N/a | ix | ī Graeca | zēta |
| Classical Latin | Pronunciation (IPA) | aː | beː | keː | deː | eː | ɛf | ɡeː | haː | iː | | kaː | ɛl | ɛm | ɛn | oː | peː | kuː | ɛr | ɛs | teː | uː | | —N/a | ɪks | iː ˈɡraɪka | ˈdzeːta |
| NATO Phonetic alphabet | Written | Alfa | Bravo | Charlie | Delta | Echo | Foxtrot | Golf | Hotel | India | Juliett | Kilo | Lima | Mike | November | Oscar | Papa | Quebec | Romeo | Sierra | Tango | Uniform | Victor | Whiskey | Xray | Yankee | Zulu |
| NATO Phonetic alphabet | Pronunciation (IPA) | /ˈalfa/ | /ˈbravo/ | /ˈtʃaːli/ | /ˈdɛlta/ | /ˈɛko/ | /ˈfɔkstrɔt/ | /ˈɡɔlf/ | /hoˈtɛl/ | /ˈindia/ | /ˈdʒuliˈɛt/ | /ˈkilo/ | /ˈlima/ | /ˈmajk/ | /noˈvɛmbaː/ | /ˈɔskaː/ | /paˈpa/ | /keˈbɛk/ | /ˈromio/ | /siˈɛra/ | /ˈtaŋɡo/ | /ˈjunifɔːm/ | /ˈviktaː/ | /ˈwiski/ | /ˈɛksrej/ | /ˈjaŋki/ | /ˈzulu/ |
| English | Written | a | bee | cee | dee | e | ef, eff | gee | aitch, haitch | i | jay | kay | el | em | en | o | pee | cue | ar | ess | tee | u | vee | double-u | ex | wye | zed, zee |
| English | Pronunciation (IPA) | /eɪ/ | /bi/ | /siː/ | /diː/ | /iː/ | /ɛf/ | /dʒiː/ | /eɪtʃ/, /heɪtʃ/ | /aɪ/ | /dʒeɪ/ | /keɪ/ | /el/ | /em/ | /en/ | /oʊ/ | /piː/ | /kjuː/ | /ɑːr/ | /ɛs/ | /tiː/ | /juː/ | /viː/ | /ˈdʌbəl.juː/ | /ɛks/ | /waɪ/ | /zɛd/, /ziː/ |
| French | Written | a | bé | cé | dé | e | effe | gé | ache | i | ji | ka | elle | emme | enne | o | pé | qu | erre | esse | té | u | vé | double vé | ixe | i grec | zède |
| French | Pronunciation (IPA) | /a/ | /be/ | /se/ | /de/ | /ə/ | /ɛf/ | /ʒe/ | /aʃ/ | /i/ | /ʒi/ | /ka/ | /ɛl/ | /ɛm/ | /ɛn/ | /o/ | /pe/ | /ky/ | /ɛʁ/ | /ɛs/ | /te/ | /y/ | /ve/ | /dubləve/ | /iks/ | /iɡʁɛk/ | /zed/ |
| German | Written | a | be | ce | de | e | eff | ge | ha | i | jot | ka | el | em | en | o | pe | qu | er | es | te | u | vau | we | ix | ypsilon | zett |
| German | Pronunciation (IPA) | /ʔaː/ | /beː/ | /t͡seː/ | /deː/ | /ʔeː/ | /ʔɛf/ | /ɡeː/ | /haː/ | /ʔiː/ | /jɔt/ | /kaː/ | /ʔɛl/ | /ʔɛm/ | /ʔɛn/ | /ʔoː/ | /peː/ | /kuː/ | /ʔɛʁ/ | /ʔɛs/ | /teː/ | /ʔuː/ | /faʊ̯/ | /veː/ | /ʔɪks/ | /ˈʔʏpsilɔn/ | /t͡sɛt/ |
| Polish | Written | a | be | ce | de | e | ef | gie | ha | i | jot | ka | el | em | en | o | pe | ku | er | es | te | u | fał | wu | iks | igrek | zet |
| Polish | Pronunciation (IPA) | /a/ | /bɛ/ | /t͡sɛ/ | /dɛ/ | /ɛ/ | /ɛf/ | /ɡjɛ/ | /xa/ | /i/ | /jɔt/ | /ka/ | /ɛl/ | /ɛm/ | /ɛn/ | /ɔ/ | /pɛ/ | /ku/ | /ɛr/ | /ɛs/ | /tɛ/ | /u/ | /faw/ | /vu/ | /iks/ | /iɡrɛk/ | /zɛt/ |
| Spanish | | a | be, be larga, be alta | ce | de | e | efe | ge | hache | i | jota | ka | ele | eme | ene | o | pe | cu | erre | ese | te | u | uve, ve, ve corta, ve baja | uve doble, ve doble, doble ve, doble u | equis | ye, i griega | zeta |
| Italian | Written | a | bi | ci | di | e | effe | gi | acca | i | i lunga | cappa | elle | emme | enne | o | pi | qu, cu | erre | esse | ti | u | vi, vu | vi doppia, doppia vu | ics | ipsilon | zeta |
| Italian | Pronunciation (IPA) | /a/ | /bi/ | /tʃi/ | /di/ | /e/ | /ˈɛffe/ | /dʒi/ | /ˈakka/ | /i/ | /i ˈlunɡa/ | /ˈkappa/ | /ˈɛlle/ | /ˈɛmme/ | /ˈɛnne/ | /ɔ/ | /pi/ | /ku/ | /ˈɛrre/ | /ˈɛsse/ | /ti/ | /u/ | /vi/, /vu/ | /vi ˈdoppja/, /ˈdoppja vu/ | /iks/ | /ˈipsilon/ | /ˈdzeta/, /ˈdzɛta/ |
| Malay (Indonesia) | Written | a | bé | cé | dé | é | éf | gé | ha | i | jé | ka | él | ém | én | o | pé | ki | ér | és | té | u | vé | wé | éks | yé | zét |
| Malay (Indonesia) | Pronunciation (IPA) | /a/ | /be/ | /t͡ʃe/ | /de/ | /e/ | /ef/ | /ɡe/ | /ha/ | /i/ | /d͡ʒe/ | /ka/ | /el/ | /em/ | /en/ | /o/ | /pe/ | /ki/ | /er/ | /es/ | /te/ | /u/ | /ve/, /fe/ | /we/ | /eks/ | /je/ | /zet/ |
| Malay (Malaysia, Brunei and Singapore) | Written | e | bi | si | di | i | éf | ji | héc | ay | jé | ké | él | ém | én | o | pi | kiu | ar | és | ti | yu | vi | dabel yu | éks | way | zet |
| Malay (Malaysia, Brunei and Singapore) | Pronunciation (IPA) | /e/ | /bi/ | /si/ | /di/ | /i/ | /ef/ | /d͡ʒi/ | /het͡ʃ/ | /i/ | /d͡ʒe/ | /ke/ | /el/ | /em/ | /en/ | /o/ | /pe/ | /kiu/, /kju/ | /ar/, /aː/ | /es/ | /ti/ | /ju/ | /vi/ | /dabəlˈju/ | /eks/ | /wai̯/ | /zed/ |
| Turkish | Written | a | be | ce | de | e | fe | ge | he, ha | i | je | ke, ka | le | me | ne | o | pe | kû, kü | re | se | te | u | ve | çift ve | iks | ye | ze |
| Turkish | Pronunciation (IPA) | /aː/ | /beː/ | /d͡ʒeː/ | /deː/ | /eː/ | /feː/ | /ɟeː/ | /heː/, /haː/ | /iː/ | /ʒeː/ | /ceː/, /kaː/ | /leː/ | /meː/ | /neː/ | /oː/ | /peː/ | /cuː/, /cyː/ | /ɾeː/ | /seː/ | /teː/ | /uː/ | /veː/ | /t͡ʃift veː/ | /ics/ | /jeː/ | /zeː/ |
