= Dze =

Cyrillic letter

Dze, ѕѣло (Early Cyrillic alphabet)
- Ѕ ѕ
- Ꙃ ꙃ, Ꙅ ꙅ

Usage
- Writing system: Cyrillic
- Type: Alphabetic
- Language of origin: Old Church Slavonic, Macedonian language
- Sound values: [d͡z], [z]

History
- Development: Ϛ ϛ or Ϝ ϝ: Ѕ ѕ
- Time period: c. 893–19th century, 1944–present
- Transliterations: Ẑ ẑ
- Variations: Ꙃ ꙃ, Ꙅ ꙅ

Other
- Associated numbers: 6 (Cyrillic numerals)

Dze (Ѕ ѕ; italics: Ѕ ѕ or Ѕ ѕ; italics: Ѕ ѕ) is a letter of the Cyrillic script, used in the Macedonian alphabet to represent the voiced alveolar affricate /d͡z/, similar to the pronunciation of ⟨ds⟩ in "needs" or "kids" in English. It is derived from the letter dzelo or zelo of the Early Cyrillic alphabet, and it was used historically in all Slavic languages that use Cyrillic.

Although fully obsolete everywhere in the Cyrillic world by the 19th century, the letter zelo was revived in 1944 by the designers of the alphabet of the then-codified Macedonian language. In the early 21st century, the same letter also appeared in Vojislav Nikčević's proposal for the new alphabet for the modern Montenegrin language.

The most common early letterform (Ѕ ѕ) resembles the Latin letter S (S s), but it is also seen reversed (Ꙅ ꙅ) like the Latin letter Reversed S (Ƨ ƨ), or Z with a tail and a tick (Ꙃ ꙃ).

Abkhaz has Abkhazian Dze (Ӡ ӡ), with an identical function and name but a different shape.

== Church Slavonic ==
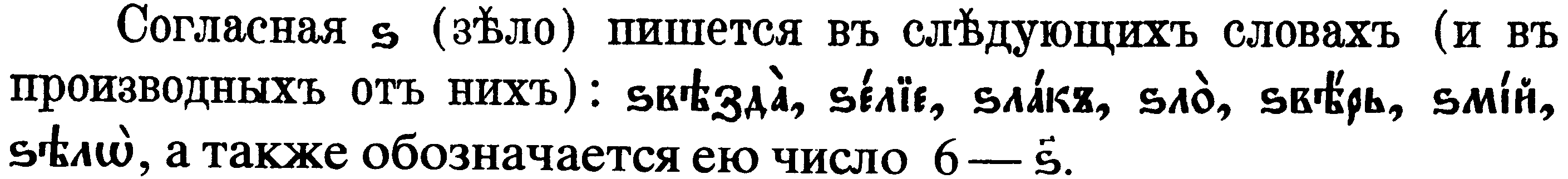
The seven root words commencing with the letter dze (aka, dzelo).

The letter is descended from ѕѣло (pronounced dzělo;) in the Early Cyrillic alphabet, where it had the numerical value 6. The letter Dzělo was itself based on the letter Dzelo in the Glagolitic alphabet. In the Glagolitic alphabet, it was written ⟨Ⰷ⟩, and had the numerical value of 8. In Old Church Slavonic it was called ѕѣло (pronounced dzeló), and in Church Slavonic it is called ѕѣлѡ (pronounced zeló).

The origin of Glagolitic letter Dzelo is unclear, but the Cyrillic Ѕ may have been influenced by the Greek stigma ⟨Ϛ⟩, the medieval form of the archaic letter digamma, which had the same form and numerical value (6). Thus the visual similarity of the Cyrillic ⟨Ѕ⟩ and Latin ⟨S⟩ is largely coincidental.

The initial sound of ⟨Ѕ⟩ in Old Church Slavonic was a soft /d͡z/ or /z/, which usually came from a historically palatalised *g (ноѕѣ, ѕвѣзда, etc.). In almost all Slavic dialects this sound was pronounced as a simple /z/; however, as the Old Church Slavonic language was based on the Bulgaro-Macedonian dialects, the sound remained distinct.

In the Old Slavic period the difference between ⟨Ѕ⟩ and ⟨З⟩ had already begun to be blurred, and in the written Church Slavonic language from the middle of the 17th century ⟨Ѕ⟩ was used only formally. The letter's distinguishing features from ⟨З⟩ are:

- ⟨Ѕ⟩ is used in root derived from these seven words beginning with ⟨Ѕ⟩: ѕвѣзда, ѕвѣрь, ѕеліе, ѕлакъ, ѕлый, ѕмій, ѕѣлѡ ("star, beast, vegetable, herb, angry, dragon, very");
- ⟨З⟩ is used in all remaining cases.
- ⟨Ѕ⟩ has the numerical value of 6, whereas ⟨З⟩ has the numerical value of 7;

== East Slavic Languages ==
See also Reforms of Russian orthography.

In Russian it was known as зѣло or zelo [zʲɪˈɫo] and had the phonetic value of /z/ or /zʲ/. In the initial version of Russian civil script of Tsar Peter I (1708), the ⟨Ѕ⟩ was assigned the sound /z/, and the letter ⟨З⟩ was removed. However, in the second version of the civil script (1710), ⟨З⟩ was restored, and ⟨Ѕ⟩ was abolished. Both versions of the alphabet were used until 1735, which is considered the date of the final elimination of ⟨Ѕ⟩ in Russian.

In Ukrainian, the sound /d͡z/ is integrated as part of the language's phonology, but it mainly occurs in loanwords rather than in words of native Ukrainian origin. As such, the digraph ⟨дз⟩ is used to represent both the phoneme /d͡z/ and the separately occurring consonant cluster /d.z/ which Ukrainian phonotactics assimilate as /d͡z.z/.

Belarusian commonly features ⟨дз⟩, but it usually comes from *d from a similar development to Polish. As such, ⟨ѕ⟩ had never been used for it.

== South Slavic Languages ==
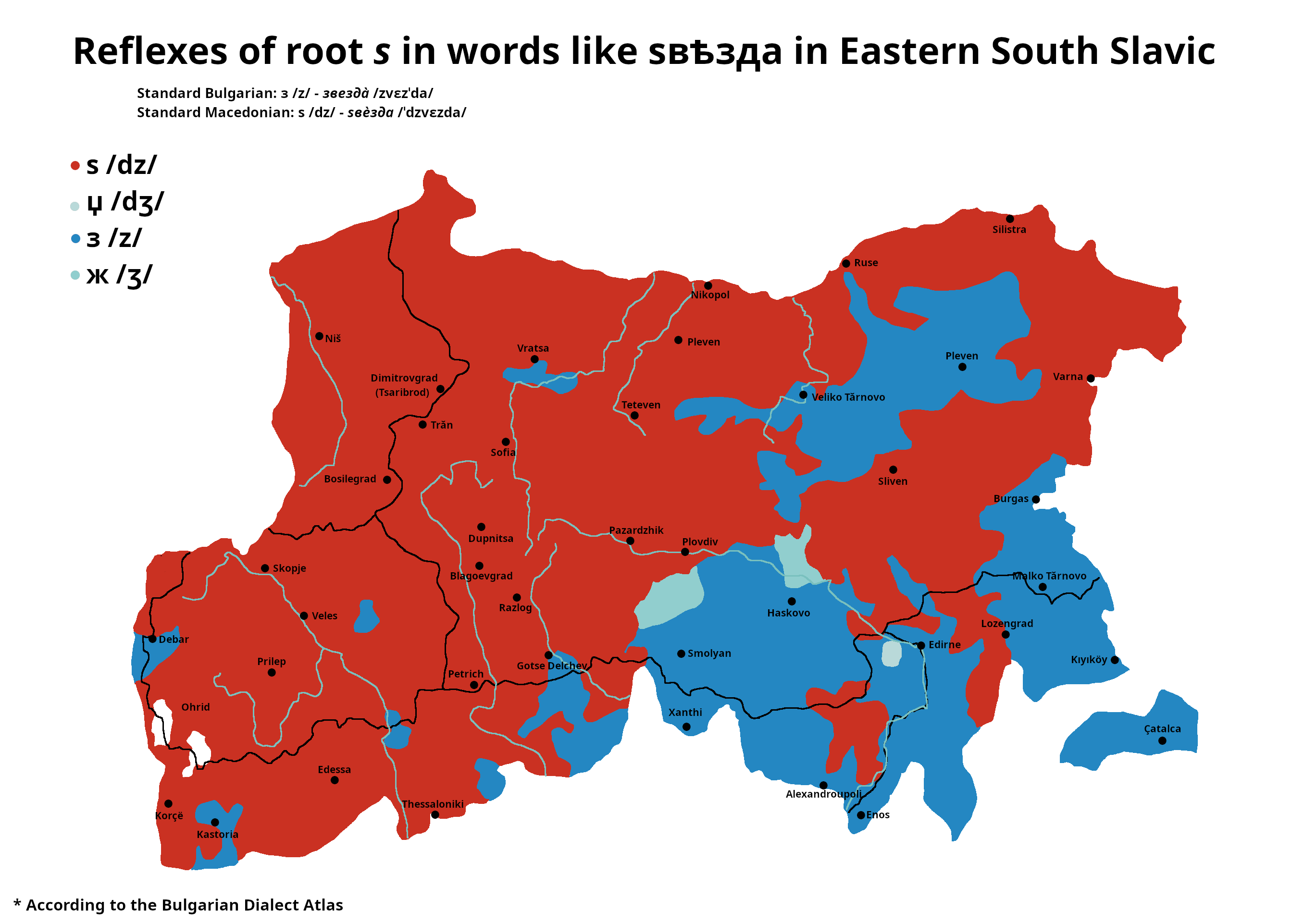
Reflexes of Old Church Slavonic ѕ across Eastern South Slavic.

⟨ѕ⟩ is now only used in the Macedonian alphabet. A commission formed to standardise the Macedonian language and orthography decided to adopt the letter on December 4, 1944, after a vote of 10-1. Despite the letter originally being found between ⟨ж⟩ and ⟨з⟩, in the new alphabet it was placed after ⟨з⟩ instead. The letter represents /dz/ (examples including: ѕид/dzid, 'wall' and ѕвезда/dzvezda, 'star'). The corresponding sound is used in all dialects of Macedonian.

⟨ѕ⟩ was also used until the middle of the 19th century in the Serbian civil script, whose orthography was closer to Church Slavonic (compared to the Russian). Vuk Karadžić's Serbian Cyrillic alphabet (1868) did not include ⟨ѕ⟩, instead favouring a simple digraph ⟨дз⟩ to represent the sound, as it was non-native. ⟨Ѕ⟩ is also included in Microsoft's Serbian Cyrillic keyboard layout, although it is not used in the Serbian Cyrillic Alphabet. The Serbian keyboard in Ubuntu replaces Ѕ with a second Ж.

The Modern Bulgarian, apart from when explicitly written with the Church Slavonic alphabet, has never used ⟨ѕ⟩. Although most dialects feature it, it is found in neither the Tărnovo dialect, the prestige dialect of the time of codification, nor in the Church Slavonic language (despite being written independently there). A few eastern dialects, including the Tărnovo dialect, have, however, independently developed both /dz/ and /dʒ/ phonemes not found in the standard language due to affrication. Marin Drinov, one of the most important players in the establishment of Standard Bulgarian, floated the idea of using ⟨ѕ⟩ as it was found in most dialects, however chose not to as he considered the letter all but forgotten.

The Banat Bulgarian dialect, being based on the Paulician dialect, retains ⟨ѕ⟩. However, as it is written with the Latin script, the sound is instead notated as ⟨dz⟩.

== Romanian ==
⟨ѕ⟩ was used in the Romanian Cyrillic alphabet (where it represented /d͡z/) until the alphabet was abolished in favour of a Latin-based alphabet in 1860-62.

== Related letters and other similar characters ==
- Ϝ ϝ : Greek letter Digamma
- Ϛ ϛ : Greek letter Stigma
- З з : Cyrillic letter Ze
- S s : Latin letter S
- Ƨ ƨ : Latin letter tone two
- X x : Latin letter X, an Albanian alphabet letter
- Ꚃ ꚃ : Cyrillic letter Dzwe
- Ḑ ḑ : Latin letter Ḑ, a Livonian alphabet letter
- D̦ d̦ : Latin letter D̦, an obsolete Romanian letter
- Dz : Digraph Dz
- Ż ż : Latin letter Z with dot above

== Computing codes ==
Character information
Preview	Ѕ		ѕ		Ꙅ		ꙅ		Ꙃ		ꙃ	
Unicode name	CYRILLIC CAPITAL LETTER DZE		CYRILLIC SMALL LETTER DZE		CYRILLIC CAPITAL LETTER REVERSED DZE		CYRILLIC SMALL LETTER REVERSED DZE		CYRILLIC CAPITAL LETTER DZELO		CYRILLIC SMALL LETTER DZELO	
Encodings	decimal	hex	dec	hex	dec	hex	dec	hex	dec	hex	dec	hex
Unicode	1029	U+0405	1109	U+0455	42564	U+A644	42565	U+A645	42562	U+A642	42563	U+A643
UTF-8	208 133	D0 85	209 149	D1 95	234 153 132	EA 99 84	234 153 133	EA 99 85	234 153 130	EA 99 82	234 153 131	EA 99 83
Numeric character reference	&#1029;	&#x405;	&#1109;	&#x455;	&#42564;	&#xA644;	&#42565;	&#xA645;	&#42562;	&#xA642;	&#42563;	&#xA643;
Named character reference	&DScy;		&dscy;									
Code page 855	137	89	136	88								
Windows-1251	189	BD	190	BE								
ISO-8859-5	165	A5	245	F5								
Macintosh Cyrillic	193	C1	207	CF								

== See also ==
- Glagolitic alphabet
- Early Cyrillic alphabet
- Cyrillic script
- Russian alphabet
- Reforms of Russian orthography
- Romanian Cyrillic alphabet
- Macedonian alphabet
- IDN homograph attack
