= Salaca Livonian =

Extinct dialect of Livonian

- Native to: Latvia
- Region: Salaca
- Extinct: c. 1868
- Language family: Uralic: Finnic; Southern Finnic; Livonian; Salaca Livonian

Language codes
- ISO 639-3: –
- Glottolog: east2326

Salaca Livonian is an extinct dialect of Livonian. It was first attested from 1665 but it went extinct in 1868, though not before being extensively studied by Anders Johan Sjögren.

It contained 6 moods and 6 tenses, and its phonology was different than that of the other two Livonian dialects.

== History ==
In the 12th century it is estimated that there were 15,000-28,000 Livonians, but over time the language drastically declined. As of the 19th century there were only 22 Salaca Livonians left who were concentrated around the Salaca River. The last speaker of Salaca Livonian died in 1868.

The first attestation of Salaca Livonian is from a 1665 chronicle written by Thomas Hiärn which collected place names, greetings, and random words. According to the text Livonian at the time was not only spoken around the Salaca River but also in Limbaži and elsewhere across northern Latvia. Though the dialect is definitely older than this chronicle and speakers had likely already began to assimilate into the larger Latvian population. More attestations of Salaca Livonian appear throughout the 1600 and 1700's but an increase in the amount of the studies occurs during the first half of the 19th century. Finnish linguist Anders Johan Sjögren systematically investigated and recorded the dialect.

== Phonology ==
While Curonian and Salaca Livonian share many phonologic changes from other Southern Finnic languages there are some changes that happened in Salaca Livonian but not Curonian Livonian. In Curonian Livonian the second syllable's a vowel has been preserved with examples being the words like ilma' (weather) and poika (son).

But in Salaca Livonian the second syllable a has been removed after a geminate with speakers instead saying ilm ~ īlm and puog ~ puok. Salaca Livonian speakers also pronounced an ü where West Curonian Livonian had an i and East Curonian Livonian had an õ. The Curonian dialects have made many changes to the o vowel but Salaca Livonian has been far more conservative with it.

ü vs i vs õ in Livonian dialects
Salaca Livonian	East Curonian Livonian	West Curonian Livonian	English
mütsa	mõtsā	mitsā	forest
tüla	tȭla/tõllõ	tīla	club
ülg ~ vülg ~ vǖlga	vȭlga	vīlga	debt

== Morphology ==
Salaca Livonian had 6 moods and 6 tenses.

Moods and Tenses
	Present	Preterite	Perfect	Pluperfect	Future	Future Perfect
Indicative	om	oļ	om ollen	oļ ollen	līb	līb ollen
Conditional	oks		oks ollen			
Imperative	ol		ol ollen		li	li ollen
Debitive	om olmist	oļ olmist	ollen olmist	oļ ollen olmist	li olmist	li ollen olmist
Quotative	ollij		ollij/ollen			
Jussive	(las) olg		olg ollen			

== Sample text ==
Salaca Livonian	English
Sinnel vajag min-d opat lībi-ski pagat.	You have to teach me to speak Livonian.
Minne-l om niema-d lüpsa-mi-st.	I have to milk cows.
S`ie räk om āk´i, ku ǖd tois tag läe-mis-t.	This path is so narrow that people have to go in single file.
