= La Lengua Chaná: Patrimonio Cultural de Entre Ríos =

Book about Chaná language and culture

- Editor: Ministry of Culture and Communication of Entre Ríos Province
- Authors: Blas Wilfredo Omar Jaime; José Pedro Viegas Barros
- Cover artist: Tirso Fiorotto; Fabia Estamatti
- Language: Spanish and Chaná
- Subjects: Chaná people language and culture
- Publisher: Editorial de Entre Ríos
- Publication date: 2013
- Media type: Print
- Pages: 145
- ISBN: 978-950-686-039-4

La Lengua Chaná: Patrimonio Cultural de Entre Ríos is a book written by Blas Wilfredo Omar Jaime and José Pedro Viegas Barros and published in Argentina in 2013, that is the first systematic work about the culture and language of Chaná people in modern times, containing a historic and linguistic overview of the language, a bilingual dictionary, and anthology of Chaná folk tales.

== Contents ==
The book is mainly divided in two parts, the first one written by linguist José Pedro Viegas Barros, telling the history of the Chaná people and the traits of their culture, analyzes the validity of the last speaker's claim through several validation criteria and after that describes the phonology and grammar of the Chaná language.

Later it follows a bilingual Chaná-Spanish dictionary and in the next chapter includes texts, songs, prayers and myths of Chaná culture with a Spanish translation, both written by Blas Wilfredo Omar Jaime. The dictionary contains around 850 entries explaining their meanings and in certain ones of interest also provide ethnographic references. The dictionary also includes their counterpart Spanish-Chaná. The book ends with a bibliography written by Viegas Barros.

== Publication ==
Editorial de Entre Ríos provincial publishing company printed the book, that included a compact disc, that was also donated to cultural and educational institutions of Entre Ríos Province.

== Public release ==
The work was released on 26 March 2014 in Nogoyá city, the hometown of Blas Jaime, coauthor and descendant of Chanás. The ceremony was held in the House of Culture of Nogoyá, and attended the Minister of Culture and Communication of Entre Ríos, Pedro Báez, and a representative of the publishing house, José María Blanco.

== Cultural impact ==
On 27 December 2015 was inaugurated a mural in the city of Viale, Entre Ríos, of 14 meters of width by 5 meters of height, about 70 square meters, painted by Bárbara Siebenlist and Negro Romero, that depicted drawings inspired by this book and as a tribute to the native peoples of the region and the suffering they lived after the attack to their human rights and their culture. The work is located at the front of the multi-purpose stadium of the municipality.

== See also ==
- Indigenous peoples of Argentina
