= Livonian =

Livonian may refer to:

- Livonians, the Livonian people
- Livonian language, a Finnic language native to the Livonian Coast of the Gulf of Riga
- Anything else pertaining to Livonia
