= Guangxi Zhuang =

Guangxi Zhuang may refer to:

- Zhuang languages spoken in Guangxi (which include both Northern Tai and Central Tai languages)
- Zhuang people in Guangxi

== See also ==
- Guangxi, an autonomous region of China for the Zhuang minority
- Standard Zhuang language, based on the dialect of Shuangqiao Township, Wuming District, Nanning, Guangxi
