= Tone five =

Letter of the Latin alphabet

- Ƽ ƽ

Usage
- Writing system: Latin script
- Type: alphabetic
- Language of origin: Zhuang languages
- Sound values: [˧˥]
- In Unicode: U+01BC U+01BD

History
- Development: 5: Ƽ ƽ
- Time period: 1957–1986

Ƽ (minuscule: ƽ) was a letter of the Latin alphabet used in the Zhuang alphabet from 1957 to 1986 to indicate its fifth tone, high-rising [˧˥]. In 1986 it was replaced by q.

It originates from an alteration of the numeral 5.

== Computing codes ==
- U+01BC Ƽ LATIN CAPITAL LETTER TONE FIVE
- U+01BD ƽ LATIN SMALL LETTER TONE FIVE

== See also ==
- Ƨ ƨ
- З з
- Ч ч
- Ƅ ƅ
