= Tone six =

Letter of the Latin alphabet

- Ƅ ƅ

Usage
- Writing system: Latin script
- Type: alphabetic
- Language of origin: Bouyei language, Zhuang language (1957–1982 spelling of h)
- Sound values: [˧]
- In Unicode: U+0184, U+0185

History
- Development: 6: Ƅ ƅ
- Time period: 1957-1986

Ƅ (minuscule: ƅ) is a letter of the Latin alphabet used in the Zhuang alphabet and Bouyei alphabet from 1957 to 1986 to indicate the sixth tone, mid-level [˧]. The 'b' shape was chosen for the letter because it resembles the digit '6', and the character represents the sixth tone. In 1986, it was replaced by h.

== Computing codes ==
- U+0184 Ƅ LATIN CAPITAL LETTER TONE SIX
- U+0185 ƅ LATIN SMALL LETTER TONE SIX

== See also ==
- Ƨ ƨ
- Ɜ ɜ
- Ч ч
- Ƽ ƽ
