= Vaide =

Village in Latvia

Vaide Livonian: Vaid
- Village
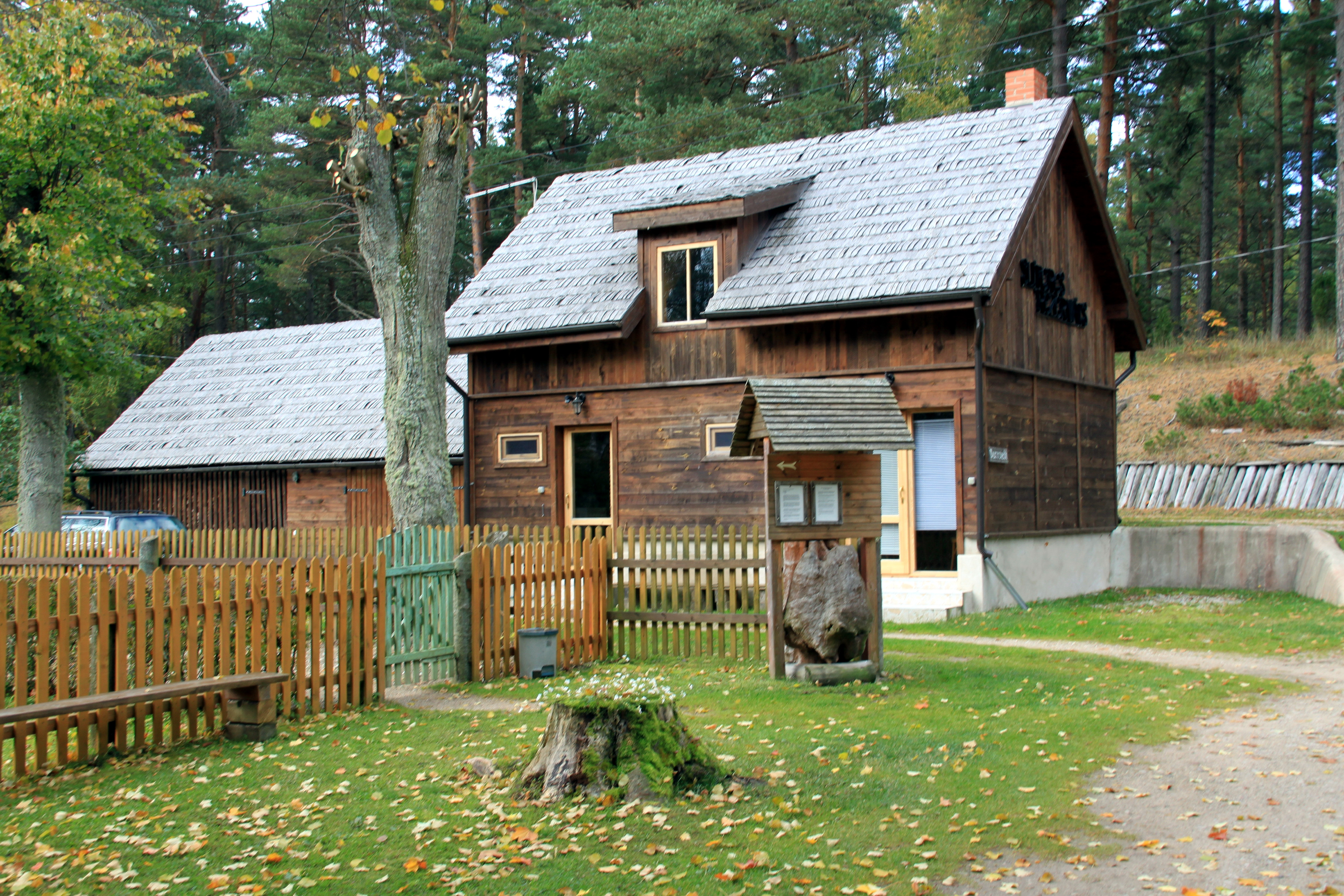
- Horn Museum in Vaide.

- Location in Latvia
- Coordinates: 57°43′41″N 22°28′10″E
- Country: Latvia
- Municipality: Talsi Municipality
- Parish: Kolka Parish
- Elevation: 16 ft (5 m)

Population (2015)
  - Total: 10
- Time zone: UTC+2 (EET)
  - Summer (DST): UTC+3 (EEST)
- Postal code: LV-3275 Kolka

Vaide (Livonian: Vaid) is a village in Kolka Parish, Talsi Municipality in the Courland region of Latvia. It is one of the remaining twelve Livonian villages on the Livonian Coast.

Poulin Klavin (Latvian: Paulīne Klaviņa), one of only a handful of native speakers of Livonian language, was born in Vaide. Poulin would help establish the Livonian folk ensemble "Līvlist". Although official statistics establish that about 200 Livonians remain in Latvia, some academics believe that Viktors Bertholds (1921-2009), originally from Vaide, was the only native speaker of Livonian in Latvia by the summer of 2008. However, the last Livonian native speaker was Grizelda Kristiņa, also from Vaide and a relative of Bertholds who died in 2013.

One of the first dachas on Livonian coast was established here in the 1960s by the Gorniks family. Later its descendants called their famous clothing manufacturer and chain of shops "VAIDE".

Vaide is also the location of the summer residence for the former President of Latvia Andris Bērziņš.

There is also a private museum, a horn collection assembled over 40 years by the museum guide and former head of Slitere National Park Edgars Hausmanis.

There is also an old cemetery next to an artificial pond.

== See also ==
- Livonian people
