= Debitive mood =

Grammatical mood

The debitive mood (abbreviated DEB) is a grammatical mood used to express obligation or duty. Examples of languages with a morphological debitive mood are: Budukh, Kryts, Latvian, Malayalam.

== Indo-European languages ==
=== Latvian ===
In debitive mood all persons are formed by declining the pronoun in the dative case and using the 3rd person present stem prefixed with jā-. Auxiliary verbs in case of compound tenses do not change, e.g., man jālasa, man bija jālasa, man ir bijis jālasa, man būs jālasa, man būs bijis jālasa – "I have to read, I had to read, I have had to read, I will have to read, I should have read" (literally "I will have to have read" where the future expresses rather a wish and replacing the future with subjunctive (man būtu bijis jālasa) would be less unorthodox.) More complex compound tenses/moods can be formed as well, e.g., quotative debitive: man būšot jālasa – "I will supposedly have to read," and so forth.

Some authors question the status of Latvian debitive as a mood on the grounds that a mood by definition cannot be combined with another mood (as can be seen above.) Some speculate that the failure of Latvian to develop a verb "to have" has contributed to the development of debitive. To express possession of something as well as necessity Latvian uses similar constructions to those used by Finnic languages, for example:

- Latvian:

Man vajag iet
I:DAT need:3.PRES.IND go:INF
literally "to me needs to go" using the modal vajadzēt (a loan from Livonian) that can be conjugated only in the 3rd person

In Livonian, a Finnic language, the word vajāg (necessary) is used in combination with the subject in the dative case and a 3rd person inflection of vȱlda ("to be") with nouns, for example:

- Livonian:

Minnõn um vajāg vietā
I:DAT is:3.PRES.IND necessary:ADV water:PTV
literally "to me is necessary water" using a similar modal to Latvian

== Dravidian languages ==
=== Malayalam ===
In Malayalam, the debitive is formed with the suffix -aɳam (-അണസ്), an enclitic form of veeɳam (വേണസ്).
