= D with comma =

Letter of the Latin alphabet

D with comma below.

D-comma (majuscule: D̦, minuscule: d̦) is a letter that was part of the Romanian alphabet to represent the sound /z/, or /dz/ if it was derived from a Latin d (e.g. d̦i, pronounced /zi/ came from Latin die, day). It was the equivalent of the Cyrillic letters З and Ѕ.

This letter was first introduced by Petru Maior in his 1819 book Ortographia romana sive Latino–Valachica, una cum clavis, qua penetralia originationis vocum reserantur...: "d̦ sicut Latinorum z ac cyrillicum з".

In 1844, Ioan Eliade introduced d̦ again, in his magazine Curierul de ambe sexe, as a substitute for з.

On 23 October 1858, the Eforia Instrucțiunii Publice of Wallachia issued a decree in which, among other rules, d̦ was for the third time adopted instead of Cyrillic з. However, the rule would not be fully adopted until later.

Taking the matter in his hands, internal affairs minister Ion Ghica stated on 8 February 1860 that whoever in his order ignored the new transitional alphabet would be fired.

In Moldavia, the transitional alphabet and the letter d̦ was adopted much later. In his grammar, published in Paris in 1865, Vasile Alecsandri adopted this sign instead of з, viewing the comma below d as a small s (d̦ was often pronounced /dz/, /ds/. This was also the case with ș—ss and ț—ts).

This letter was abandoned in 1904 and is no longer in use.

This letter is part of the Livonian alphabet but is presented with D-cedilla in practice.

This letter represents [ð] in Ithkuil.

== Computer encoding ==
Unicode does not include precomposed characters for D̦ d̦—they must be represented with a combining diacritic, which may not align properly in some fonts. Nevertheless, the sequence of base character + combining diacritic is given a unique name. Otherwise, the D-cedilla (Ḑ ḑ) is somewhat to be a substitute as part of the Unicode standards because the visual appearance of D-cedilla is identical to D-comma as of the Unicode Consortium code chart for Latin Extended Additional.

== See also ==
- S with comma
- T with comma
