= Tuļļi Lum =

Estonian musical group

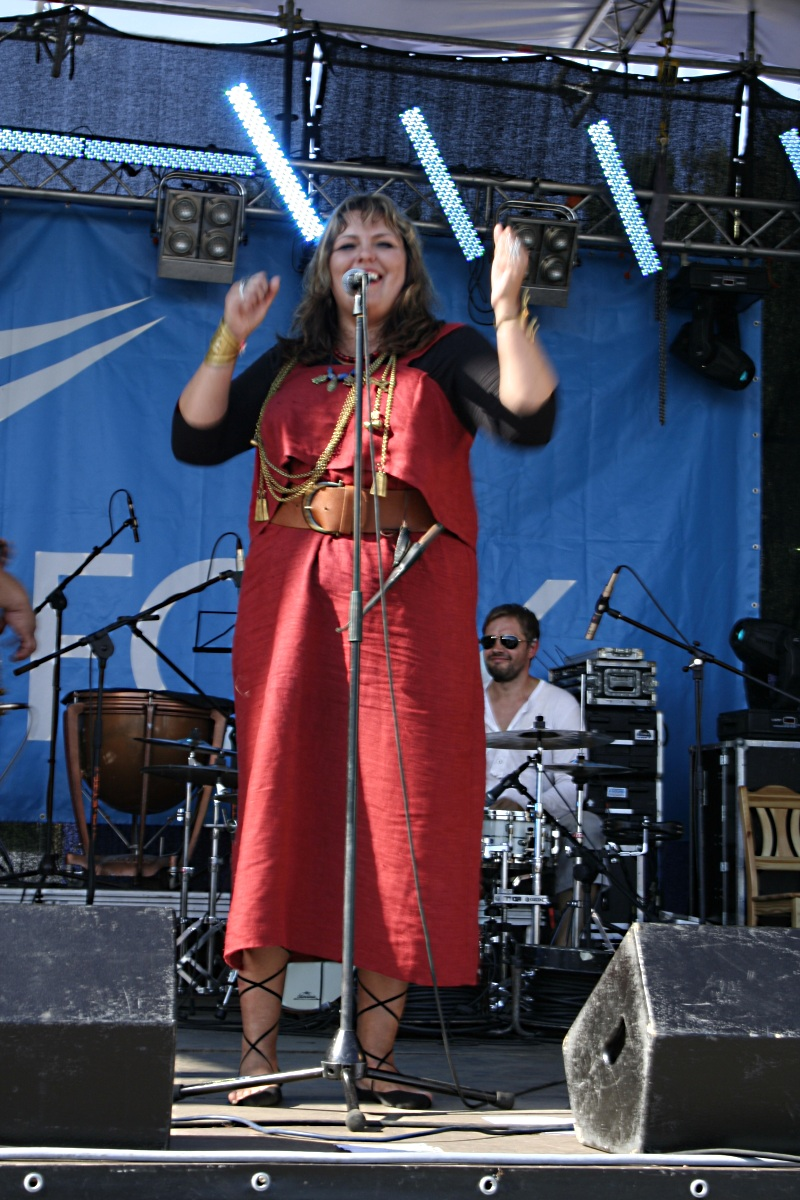
- Julgī Stalte performing with Tuļļi Lum in Käsmu, Estonia in August 2009

Background information
- Origin: Estonia
- Genres: Folk music; jazz
- Years active: 1999–present
- Members: Julgī Stalte; Alari Piispea; Tiit Kikas; Meelis Unt; Jaan Sööt; Tiit Kevad; Toomas Rull; Toomas Lunge

Tuļļi Lum (Livonian for "hot snow"; often simplified as "Tulli Lum") is an Estonian/Livonian folk music band that was formed in 1999 when the Estonian ensemble found Livonian Julgī Stalte, originally from Riga, Latvia, while she was studying music in Estonia.

The basis of much of the group's works are the books of the Estonian folklorist Oskar Loorits, while musically they are considered a fusion between authentic Livonian folk music and jazz.

== Members ==
- Julgī Stalte – vocals
- Alari Piispea – bass guitar
- Tiit Kikas – fiddle
- Meelis Unt – saxophone
- Jaan Sööt – guitar, kannel
- Tiit Kevad – drums
- Toomas Rull – percussion
- Toomas Lunge – keyboards, accordion, mandolin.

== Album ==
- Tuļļi Lum (2000)

Track listing:

1. Līgõ (Let it be)
2. Tōți broutšõb Rīgõ (Daddy went to Riga)
3. Mäd sizār (Our sister)
4. Astā, veļ, tȭlpa pǟl (Brother, blow your horn)
5. Joutõmlaps loul (An orphan's song)
6. Ōra um (It is so rare)
7. Lōla, izā, lōla, pūoga (Sing, daddy, sing, son)
8. Jōņ loul (Midsummer's night's song)
9. Ni kīlmiz (The frost has come)
10. Sov (Smoke)
11. Eijõ (Lullaby)
