= Ḑ =

Latin letter D with cedilla

D-cedilla

D-cedilla (majuscule: Ḑ, minuscule: ḑ) is a letter of the Latin alphabet, consisting of the letter D with a cedilla under it. The letter stands for the voiced palatal plosive [ɟ] in the Livonian alphabet. Before a 1904 spelling reform, the letter was also used in Romanian for the voiced alveolar fricative [z] in Latin-derived words where Latin had used ⟨d⟩ — the reform replaced this with a simple ⟨z⟩; see Obsolete letters of the Romanian alphabet.

Depending on certain fonts, the cedilla traditionally looks like a comma below in Livonian use. In other use, like UNGEGN romanizations, the cedilla is like a regular cedilla.

D-cedilla is listed as an allograph of D-comma (D̦d̦) in Ithkuil.

== Computer encoding ==
Character information
Preview	Ḑ		ḑ	
Unicode name	LATIN CAPITAL LETTER D WITH CEDILLA		LATIN SMALL LETTER D WITH CEDILLA	
Encodings	decimal	hex	dec	hex
Unicode	7696	U+1E10	7697	U+1E11
UTF-8	225 184 144	E1 B8 90	225 184 145	E1 B8 91
Numeric character reference	&#7696;	&#x1E10;	&#7697;	&#x1E11;

== See also ==
- D-comma
