= Livonian language revival =

Ongoing language revival in Latvia

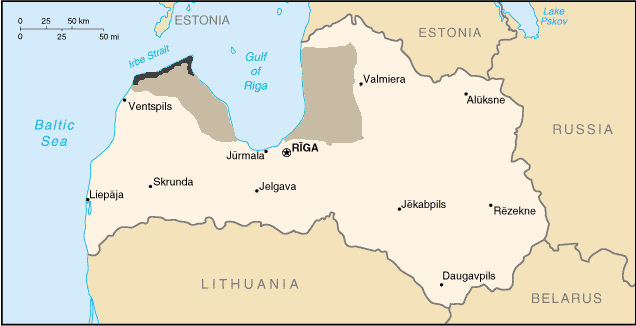
Map of Latvia showing the historical distribution of the Livonian language (in grey) and the current areas with some knowledge of it (in black)

The Livonian language, spoken for centuries in Latvia, gradually declined until the death of its last fluent native speaker, Grizelda Kristiņa, on 2 June 2013. Nevertheless, today there are several ethnic Livonians that are striving for the revival of the language, with about 210 people with some knowledge of it in the world.

== Background ==
The Livonian language is a Finnic language, similar to Estonian and Finnish, spoken in Latvia. Its gradual decline, which had already been occurring for centuries earlier, was accelerated after the Soviet occupation of Latvia in 1940. The Soviet Army took control of the Livonian Coast, the place where a few hundred Livonian speakers still remained, and restricted access to the area.

The Livonian language became extinct on 2 June 2013 when Grizelda Kristiņa, its last fluent native speaker, died at age 103. She had left Latvia in 1944 due to its occupation by the Soviets and settled in Canada, where she lived until her death. She helped researchers preserve the language while being there. Shortly before her death, in the Latvian census of 2011, some 250 people declared their ethnicity to be Livonian.

== Revival ==
Since the restoration of Latvian independence in 1991, the Livonian language has been undergoing a revival process. As of 1998, there were already young Livonian volunteers motivated with the idea of reviving the language. Some of them were taught by Livonian teachers using a textbook written by Kersti Boiko, a professor at the University of Latvia, with 800 words designed to be taught during 10 lessons. A collection of Livonian poems had also been published and printed by then. A decade later, the movement was still popular among Livonian youth, some of whom met regularly in Riga, the Latvian capital, and then went to the village of Mazirbe (where there is a Livonian cultural center) or to Livonian language-only camps.

The Livonian language revival movement is not being supported by either the government of Latvia or any other (such as the Estonian one), so it depends on Livonian cultural organizations. Some examples of these are the Livonian Association (Līvõd Īt), the Society of Friends of Livonia (Liivi Sõprade Selts) or the Livonian Cultural Center (Līvõ Kultūr Sidām). These organize cultural events and publish studies on the Livonians, including their language.

As of 2011, the number of people who had some knowledge of the language at a level of A1 or A2 was 210, while those who had a knowledge of B1 or higher were 40. Some of them learned what they know of the language through programs of the Latvian Academy of Culture or the universities of Tartu, Helsinki or Latvia.

A report by Public Broadcasting of Latvia published on 18 October 2022 claimed that two-year-old Kuldi Medne was the only person in Latvia whose mother tongue is Livonian. Her parents are Livonian language revival activists Jānis Mednis and Renāte Medne.

On 25 January 2023, a Livonian-language traffic sign, the first of its kind in Latvia, was erected in Talsi Municipality (Tālsa mōgõn) to reflect its Livonian cultural heritage. Several other signs of this type are planned to be established in the region.

== See also ==
- List of revived languages
- Cornish language revival
- Māori language revival
- Revival of the Hebrew language
