= Extinct language =

Language with no living native speakers

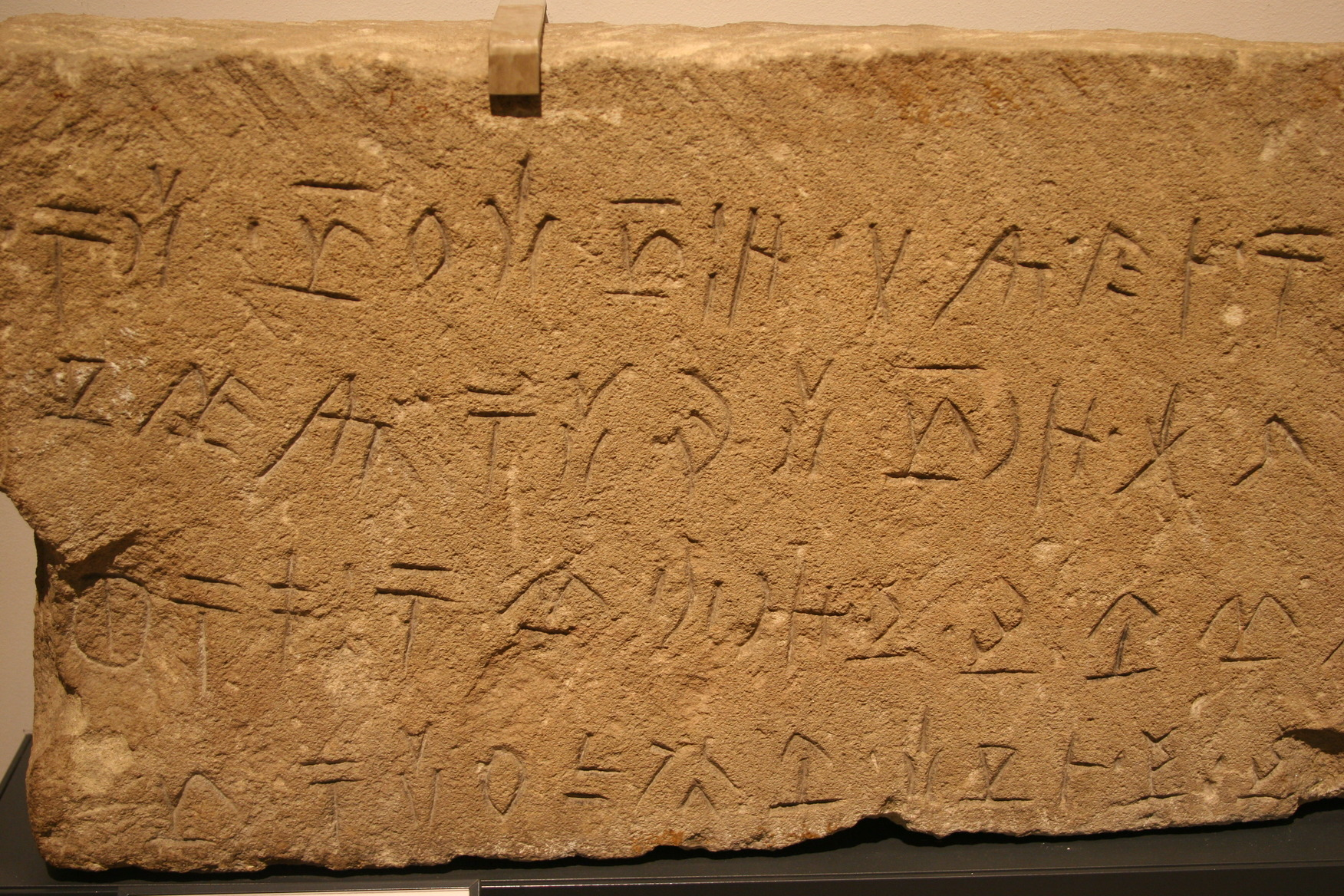
A piece of Eteocypriot writing from Amathous, Cyprus, dated c. 500–300 BCE, on display at Ashmolean Museum

An extinct language or dead language is a language with no living native speakers. A heritage language, or sometimes a dormant language, is an extinct language that still serves as a symbol of ethnic identity to an ethnic group; these languages are often undergoing a process of revitalisation. Languages that have first-language speakers are known as living languages.

Language extinction is typically a result of cultural assimilation leading to language shift, and the gradual abandonment of a native language in favor of a foreign lingua franca.

As of the 2000s, a total of roughly 7,000 languages are spoken worldwide. Most of these are minor languages in danger of extinction; one estimate published in 2004 expected that some 90% of the languages spoken at that time will have become extinct by 2050.

== Language death ==
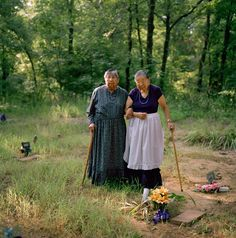
Sisters Maxine Wildcat Barnett (1925–2021) (left) and Josephine Wildcat Bigler (1921–2016); two of the last elderly speakers of Yuchi, visiting their grandmother's grave in a cemetery behind Pickett Chapel in Sapulpa, Oklahoma. According to the sisters, their grandmother had insisted that Yuchi be their native language.

Normally the transition from a spoken to an extinct language occurs when a language undergoes language death by being directly replaced by a different one. For example, many Native American languages were replaced by Dutch, English, French, Portuguese, or Spanish as a result of European colonization of the Americas.

After a language has ceased to be spoken as a first language, it may continue to exist as learned, second language, such as Latin.

In a view that prioritizes written representation over natural language acquisition and evolution, historical languages with living descendants that have undergone significant language change may be considered "extinct", especially in cases where they did not leave a corpus of literature or liturgy that remained in widespread use (see corpus language), as is the case with Old English or Old High German relative to their contemporary descendants, English and German. This is accomplished by periodizing English and German as Old; for Latin, an apt clarifying adjective is Classical, which also normally includes designation of high or formal register.

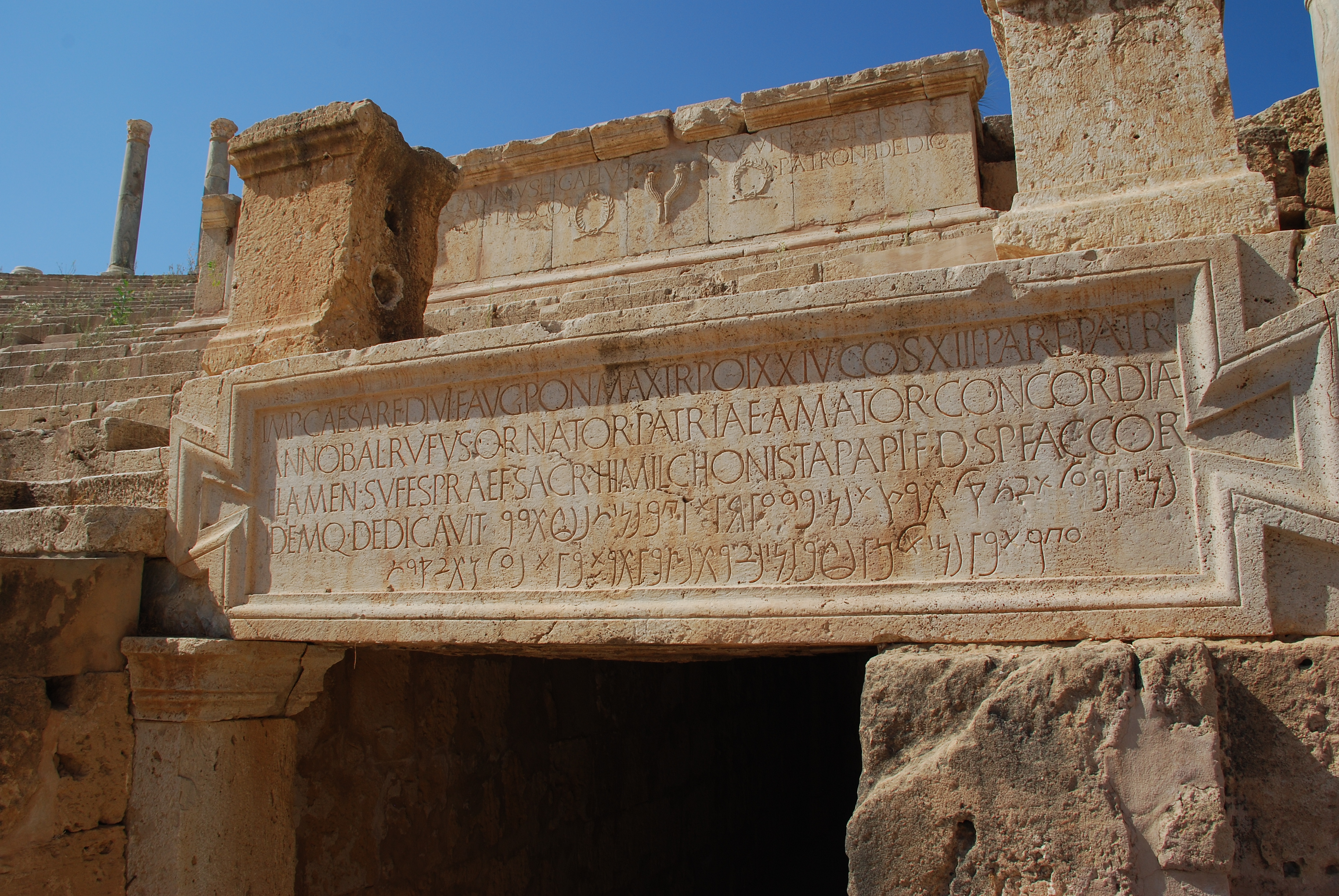
Bilingual Latin–Punic inscription at the theatre in Leptis Magna in present-day Libya

Minor languages are endangered mostly due to economic and cultural globalization, cultural assimilation, and development. With increasing economic integration on national and regional scales, people find it easier to communicate and conduct business in the dominant lingua francas of world commerce: English, Mandarin Chinese, Spanish, and French.

In their study of contact-induced language change, American linguists Sarah Grey Thomason and Terrence Kaufman (1991) stated that in situations of cultural pressure (where populations are forced to speak a dominant language), three linguistic outcomes may occur: first – and most commonly – a subordinate population may shift abruptly to the dominant language, leaving the native language to a sudden linguistic death. Second, the more gradual process of language death may occur over several generations. The third and most rare outcome is for the pressured group to maintain as much of its native language as possible, while borrowing elements of the dominant language's grammar (replacing all, or portions of, the grammar of the original language). A now disappeared language may leave a substantial trace as a substrate in the language that replaces it. There have, however, also been cases where the language of higher prestige did not displace the native language but left a superstrate influence. The French language for example shows evidence both of a Celtic substrate and a Frankish superstrate.

Institutions such as the education system, as well as (often global) forms of media such as the Internet, television, and print media play a significant role in the process of language loss. For example, when people migrate to a new country, their children attend school in the country, and the schools are likely to teach them in the majority language of the country rather than their parents' native language.

Language death can also be the explicit goal of government policy. For example, part of the "kill the Indian, save the man" policy of American Indian boarding schools and other measures was to prevent Native Americans from transmitting their native language to the next generation and to punish children who spoke the language of their culture of origin. The French vergonha policy likewise had the aim of eradicating minority languages.

== Language revival ==
Language revival is the attempt to re-introduce an extinct language in everyday use by a new generation of native speakers. The optimistic neologism "sleeping beauty languages" has been used to express such a hope, though scholars usually refer to such languages as dormant.

In practice, this has only happened on a large scale successfully once: the revival of the Hebrew language. Hebrew had survived for millennia since the destruction of the second temple mostly as a liturgical language, but not as a vernacular language. The revival of Hebrew has been largely successful due to extraordinarily favourable conditions, notably the adoption of it as a lingua franca amongst the Jewish community in Palestine prior to 1948 (which grew as a result of successive waves of immigration by Jews in the 19th and 20th centuries, many of whom spoke Yiddish, Ladino and Judeo-Arabic dialects), the creation of a nation state (modern Israel in 1948) in which it became the official language, as well as Eliezer Ben-Yehuda's dedication to the revival of the language, by creating new words for the modern terms Hebrew lacked.

Revival attempts for minor extinct languages with no status as a liturgical language typically have more modest results. The Cornish language revival has proven at least partially successful: after a century of effort there are 3,500 claimed native speakers, enough for UNESCO to change its classification from "extinct" to "critically endangered". A Livonian language revival movement to promote the use of the Livonian language has managed to train a few hundred people to have some knowledge of it.

== Recently extinct languages ==
This is a list of languages reported as having become extinct since 2010. For a more complete list, see Lists of extinct languages.

Date	Language	Language family	Region	Terminal speaker	Notes
17 September 2026	Chaná	Charruan	Entre Ríos, Argentina and Uruguay	Blas Wilfredo Omar Jaime	Undergoing revitalization since 2013. Jaime's daughter Evangelina also speaks Chaná.
4 August 2026	Guató	Isolate	Mato Grosso do Sul, Brazil	Vicente Manoel da Silva	
7 March 2026	Hupa	Na-Dene	California, United States	Verdena Parker	Undergoing revitalization since the 1970s.
16 October 2025	Lekwungen dialect of North Straits Salish	Salishan	British Columbia, Canada	Čeyɬəm (Elmer George)	
20 September 2025	Aurê-Aurá	Tupian	Maranhão, Brazil	Aurá	
14 July 2025	Caddo	Caddoan	Oklahoma, United States	Edmond Johnson	Under a process of revitalization since 2022.
by 2024	Mawes	Northwest Papuan?	West Papua, Indonesia		
2 May 2023	Columbia-Moses	Salishan	Washington, United States	Pauline Stensgar	
by 2023	Itonama	Isolate	Beni Department, Bolivia		
by 2023	Kuyubí dialect of Moré	Chapacuran	Rondônia, Brazil		
5 October 2022	Mednyj Aleut	Mixed Aleut–Russian	Commander Islands, Russia	Gennady Yakovlev	
19 April 2022	Quapaw	Siouan	Tulsa, Oklahoma, United States	Ardina Moore	
16 February 2022	Yahgan	Isolate	Magallanes, Chile	Cristina Calderón	
by 2022?	Moghol	Mongolic	Herat Province, Afghanistan		Unknown if still spoken.
25 September 2021	Wukchumni dialect of Tule-Kaweah Yokuts	Yokuts	California, United States	Marie Wilcox	
27 August 2021	Yuchi	Isolate	Tennessee (formerly) and Oklahoma in the United States	Maxine Wildcat Barnett	
7 March 2021	Bering Aleut dialect of Aleut	Eskimo-Aleut	Kamchatka Krai, Russia	Vera Timoshenko	
after 2020	Dompo	Niger–Congo	Brong-Ahafo region, Banda District, Ghana		
27 July 2018	Tuscarora	Iroquoian	North Carolina, United States	Howard "Howdy" Hill	Under a process of revival.
4 April 2020	Aka-Cari dialect of Northern Andamanese	Great Andamanese	Andaman Islands, India	Licho	
23 March 2019	Ngandi	Gunwinyguan	Northern Territory, Australia	C. W. Daniels	
4 January 2019	Tehuelche	Chonan	Patagonia, Argentina	Dora Manchado	
November 2018	Sapé	Isolate	Venezuela	Ramón Quimillo Lezama	
2018	Patwin	Wintuan	California, United States	Bertha Wright Mitchell	Being taught in schools and learned by adults. 1 speaker reported in 2021.
2017	Air Matoa		Etna Bay, Indonesia		
by 2017	Hokkaido Ainu	Ainu	Hokkaido, Japan		Semispeakers remain.
9 December 2016	Mandan	Siouan	North Dakota, United States	Edwin Benson	
30 August 2016	Wichita	Caddoan	Oklahoma, United States	Doris McLemore	
29 July 2016	Gugu Thaypan	Pama-Nyungan	Queensland, Australia	Tommy George	
11 February 2016	Nuchatlaht dialect of Nuu-chah-nulth	Wakashan	British Columbia, Canada	Alban Michael	
4 January 2016	Whulshootseed dialect of Lushootseed	Salishan	Washington, United States	Ellen Williams	
by 2016	Marti Ke	Western Daly	Northern Territory, Australia	Patrick Nudjulu or Agatha Perdjert	
4 February 2014	Klallam	Salishan	Washington, United States	Hazel Sampson (Note: Last surviving native speaker.)	being taught as a second language on the Olympic Peninsula of Washington State
January 2014	Torona	Atlantic–Congo	South Kordofan, South Sudan	Karaɽul Alunga Almendi	
by 2014	Worrorra	Worrorra	Western Australia		Only partial or passive speakers remain as of 2014.
5 June 2013	Livonian	Uralic	Latvia	Grizelda Kristiņa (Note: Last surviving native speaker; some children still learn it as a second language.)	Under a process of revival. 1 native speaker as of 2020.
26 March 2013	Yurok	Algic	California, United States	Archie Thompson	Under a process of revival.
by 2013	Demushbo	Panoan	Amazon Basin, Brazil		1 speaker in 2010.
2 October 2012	Cromarty dialect of Scots	Indo-European	Northern Scotland, United Kingdom	Bobby Hogg	
11 July 2012	Upper Chinook	Chinookan	Oregon, United States	Gladys Thompson	
10 March 2012	Holikachuk	Na-Dene	Alaska, United States	Wilson "Tiny" Deacon	
2012	Andoa	Zaparoan	Peru	Hipólito Arahuanaza	
2012	Mardijker	Portuguese-based creole	Jakarta, Indonesia	Mimi Abrahams	
c. 2012	Dhungaloo dialect of Taribelang	Pama-Nyungan	Queensland, Australia	Roy Hatfield	
10 April 2011	Apiaká	Tupian	Mato Grosso, Brazil	Pedrinho Kamassuri	
2011	Lower Arrernte	Pama-Nyungan	Northern Territory, Australia	Brownie Doolan Perrurle	
24 October 2010	Pazeh dialect of Pazeh–Kaxabu	Austronesian	Taiwan	Pan Jin-yu	
20 August 2010	Cochin Indo-Portuguese Creole	Portuguese-based creole	Southern India	William Rozario	
26 January 2010	Aka-Bo	Andamanese	Andaman Islands, India	Boa Sr.	
by 2010	Piru dialect of Luhu	Austronesian	Maluku, Indonesia		

== See also ==
- Category:Extinct languages
- Classical language
- Endangered language
- Globalization
- Language attrition
- Language death
- Language revival
- Language teaching
- Lists of extinct languages
- Lists of endangered languages
- List of modern literature translated into dead languages
- List of revived languages

== Bibliography ==
- Adelaar, Willem F. H.; & Muysken, Pieter C. (2004). The Languages of the Andes. Cambridge Language Surveys. Cambridge: Cambridge University Press. ISBN 978-0-521-36275-7.
- Brenzinger, Matthias (ed.) (1992) Language Death: Factual and Theoretical Explorations with Special Reference to East Africa. Berlin/New York: Mouton de Gruyter. ISBN 978-3-11-013404-9.
- Campbell, Lyle; & Mithun, Marianne (Eds.). (1979). The Languages of Native America: Historical and Comparative Assessment. Austin: University of Texas Press. ISBN 0-292-74624-5.
- Davis, Wade. (2009). The Wayfinders: Why Ancient Wisdom Matters in the Modern World. House of Anansi Press. ISBN 0-88784-766-8.
- Dorian, Nancy C. (1978). 'Fate of Morphological Complexity in Language Death: Evidence from East Sutherland Gaelic.' Language, 54 (3), 590–609.
- Dorian, Nancy C. (1981). Language Death: The Life Cycle of a Scottish Gaelic dialect. Philadelphia: University of Pennsylvania Press. ISBN 0-8122-7785-6.
- Dressler, Wolfgand & Wodak-Leodolter, Ruth (eds.) (1977) 'Language Death' (International Journal of the Sociology of Language vol. 12). The Hague: Mouton.
- Gordon, Raymond G. Jr. (Ed.). (2005). Ethnologue: Languages of the World (15th ed.). Dallas, TX: SIL International. ISBN 1-55671-159-X. (Online version: http://www.ethnologue.com).
- Harrison, K. David. (2007) When Languages Die: The Extinction of the World's Languages and the Erosion of Human Knowledge. New York and London: Oxford University Press. ISBN 978-0-19-518192-0.
- Mithun, Marianne. (1999). The Languages of Native North America. Cambridge: Cambridge University Press. ISBN 0-521-23228-7 (hbk); ISBN 0-521-29875-X.
- Mohan, Peggy; & Zador, Paul. (1986). 'Discontinuity in a Life Cycle: The Death of Trinidad Bhojpuri.' Language, 62 (2), 291–319.
- Sasse, Hans-Jürgen (1992) 'Theory of Language Death', in Brenzinger (ed.) Language Death, pp. 7–30.
- Schilling-Estes, Natalie; & Wolfram, Walt. (1999). 'Alternative Models of Dialect Death: Dissipation vs. Concentration.' Language, 75 (3), 486–521.
- Sebeok, Thomas A. (Ed.). (1973). Linguistics in North America (parts 1 & 2). Current Trends in Linguistics (Vol. 10). The Hauge: Mouton. (Reprinted as Sebeok 1976).
- Sharp, Joanne. (2008). Chapter 6: 'Can the Subaltern Speak?', in Geographies of Postcolonialism. Glasgow, UK: SAGE Publications Ltd. ISBN 978-1-4129-0779-8.
- Skutnabb-Kangas, Tove. (2000). Linguistic Genocide in Education or Worldwide Diversity and Human Rights? Mahwah, New Jersey: Lawrence Erlbaum Associates. ISBN 0-8058-3468-0.
- Thomason, Sarah Grey & Kaufman, Terrence. (1991). Language Contact, Creolization, and Genetic Linguistics. University of California Press. ISBN 0-520-07893-4.
- Timmons Roberts, J. & Hite, Amy. (2000). From Modernization to Globalization: Perspectives on Development and Social Change. Wiley-Blackwell. ISBN 978-0-631-21097-9.
