= Viktors Bertholds =

One of the last native speakers of Livonian (1921–2009)

- Born: 16 January 1921; Vaide, Ventspils County, Latvia
- Died: 28 February 2009 (aged 88)

Viktors Bertholds (16 January 1921 – 28 February 2009) was a Livonian and one of the last native speakers of the Livonian language. He was born in the village of Vaide (Livonian: Vaid) in 1921. Formerly believed to be the last native speaker of Livonian, this title actually belonged to Grizelda Kristiņa, a relative of Bertholds who died in 2013.
