= Chaná people =

Yañá; Chañá
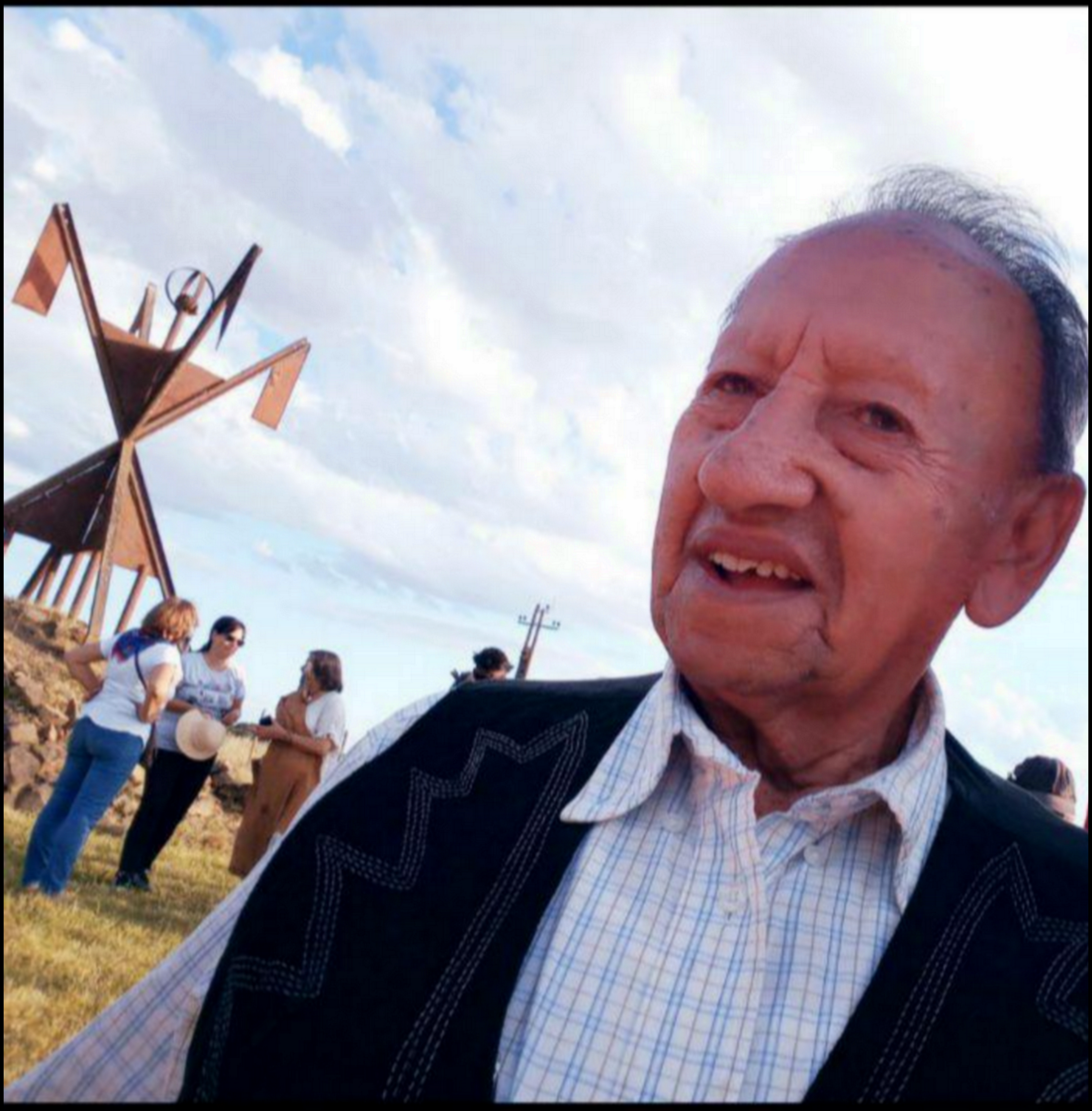
- Blas Wilfredo Omar Jaime, the last speaker of the Chaná language

Total population
- unknown

Regions with significant populations
- Argentina, Uruguay

Languages
- Chaná

Related ethnic groups
- Charrúa people, Guaraní people

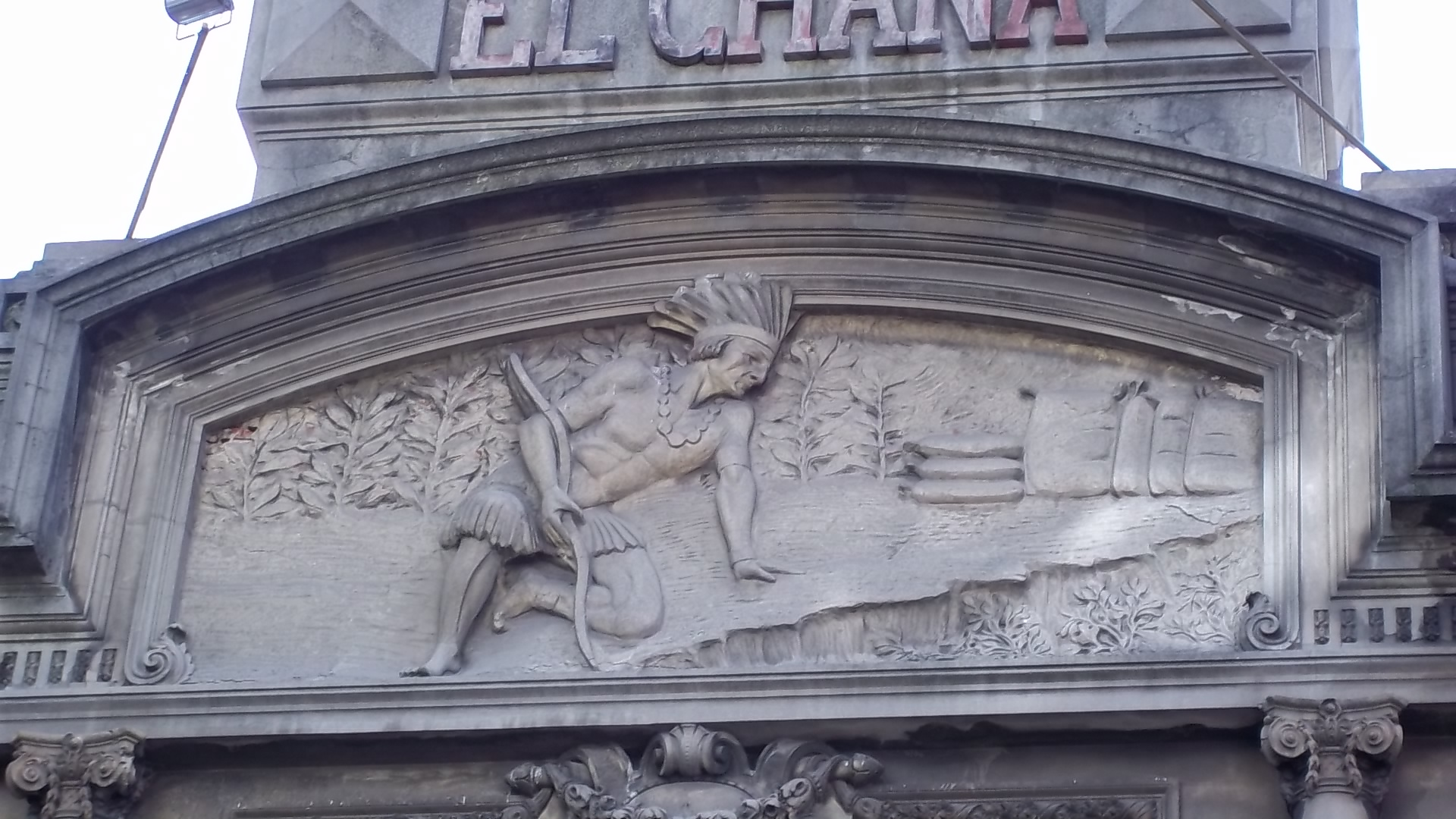
Artistic depiction of a Chaná on a building in Montevideo.

Chaná (endonym: Chañá or Yañá) were one of the Native nations of Argentina and Uruguay. Their native language is Chaná (lantek yañá), which was only remembered by one person, Blas Wilfredo Omar Jaime.

Their culture was previously semi-nomadic. After the arrival of Europeans and the introduction of cattle, they started using leather for dressing.

== Legacy ==
Their name was kept in a well-known local coffee brand, "Café El Chaná". A street in Montevideo (Cordón) bears the name "Chaná".

== See also ==
- Chaná language
- Chaná mythology
