= Chaná language =

Extinct Charruan language of South America

Chaná
- Lanték Yañá
- Native to: Uruguay, Argentina
- Region: Around Uruguay River and Paraná River and Río de la Plata
- Ethnicity: Chaná people
- Extinct: 17 September 2026, with the death of Blas Wilfredo Omar Jaime
- Revival: 2005; several students in both Uruguay and Argentina
- Language family: Charruan: Chaná

Language codes
- ISO 639-3: None (mis)
- Glottolog: chan1296
- Linguasphere: 85-DCA-d
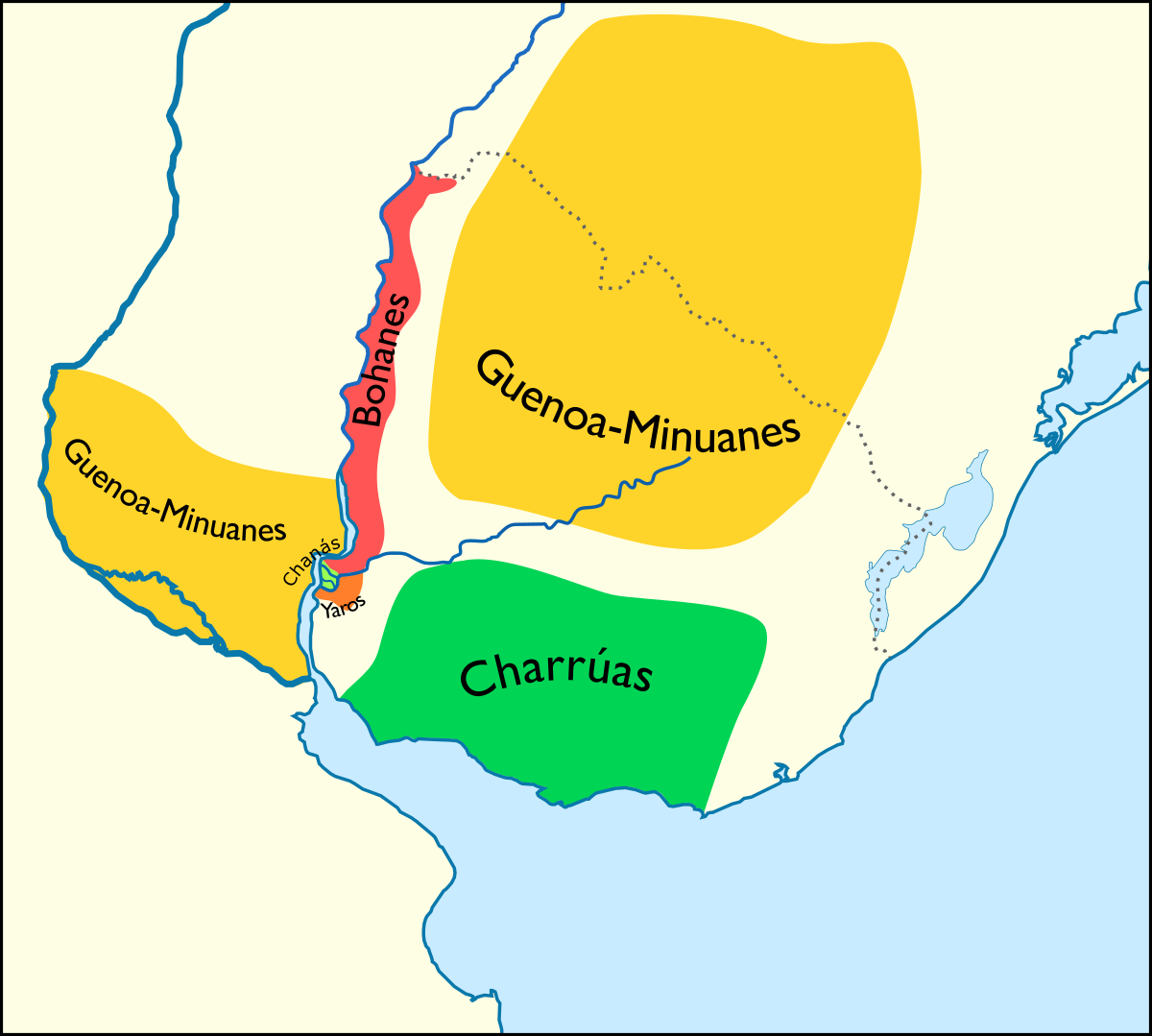
- Chaná

- Chaná is classified as Critically Endangered by the UNESCO Atlas of the World's Languages in Danger

The Chaná language (Chaná: Lanték 'speak' or 'language'; from lan, "tongue" and tek a communicative suffix) is an extinct Charruan language, spoken by the Chaná people, in what is now Argentina and Uruguay along the Uruguay and Paraná Rivers on the margins of the Río de la Plata.

== Geographical distribution ==
It was spoken by the Chaná from pre-Columbian times in the vast region that today is between Entre Ríos Province, Argentina and Uruguay, and the Uruguay and Paraná Guazú Rivers. According to recent oral memory narratives, in ancient times, they inhabited territories around the current Brazilian margin of the Uruguay River. They later migrated from this location along the Uruguay and Paraná Rivers from the outfall of the Iguazú River and from the Paraguay River to the current location of Asunción.

== History ==
Blas Wilfredo Omar Jaime was the last native person who could speak Chaná, and prior to his discovery of the fact that he was the last speaker, he had not used Chaná for many decades, eroding his memory of the language. The UNESCO Atlas of the World's Languages in Danger recognized it as a living language. The Chamber of Deputies of the Entre Ríos Province recognized the necessity for the government to recognize and protect the language in 2018. Jaime died on 17 September 2026.

=== Documentation ===
Lanték has been recognized as a part of the "Cultural Heritage of the Entre Ríos Province." The first dictionary of the language was published by the Provincial Publishing House of Entre Ríos. The publication contained a dictionary compiled via Don Blas Wilfredo Omar Jaime and an encyclopedic study of Chaná culture. There were also several chapters on the linguistics of Chaná by Viegas Barros.

The Chaná cultural study encompassed the fourth and last section of the book. A great deal of Chaná ethnoliterature was obtained during elicitation sessions with Viegas Barros during the seven years prior to the publication of the volume. It also has an audio CD which includes recordings of Don Blas speaking his Lanték.

== Phonology ==
The following are the phonemes of the Chaná language:

=== Consonants ===
Consonant phonemes of modern Chaná
		Bilabial	Alveolar	Palatal	Velar	Glottal
Stop	voiceless	p	t	tʃ	k	ʔ
Stop	voiced	b	d	ʒ	g	
Fricative			s	ʃ	(x)	h
Flap			ɾ			
Lateral			l			
Trill			r			
Nasal		m	n	ɲ		
Glide		w		j		

=== Vowels ===
Monophthong vowel phonemes
	Front	Central	Back
Close	i		u
Mid	e		o
Open		a	

== Bibliography ==
- Jaime, Blas Wilfredo Omar; Viegas Barros, José Pedro (2013). La lengua chaná, patrimonio cultural de Entre Ríos. (in Spanish and Chaná). Paraná: Editorial de Entre Ríos. ISBN 978-950-686-039-4.
- Larrañaga, Dámaso Antonio (1923) "Compendio del idioma de la Nación Chaná"; Escritos de D. Dámaso A. Larrañaga, tomo III: 163-174. Montevideo: Instituto Histórico y Geográfico del Uruguay, Imprenta Nacional.
