= Standard Zhuang =

Standard variety and register of the Zhuang Tai (Kra-Dai) language cluster

- Vahcuengh Biucinj
- Pronunciation: [βa˧ɕuːŋ˧ piːu˨˦ɕin˥]
- Native to: China
- Ethnicity: Zhuang
- Language family: Kra–Dai: Tai; Northern Tai (Northern Zhuang); Standard Zhuang
- Writing system: Latin script (official), Sawndip

Official status
- Official language in: China: Guangxi Zhuang Autonomous Region
- Recognised minority language in: China (Wenshan Prefecture in Yunnan)
- Regulated by: Ethnic Minority Language Work Committee of Guangxi Zhuang Autonomous Region

Language codes
- ISO 639-1: za (all Zhuang)
- ISO 639-2: zha
- ISO 639-3: None (mis)
- Glottolog: None

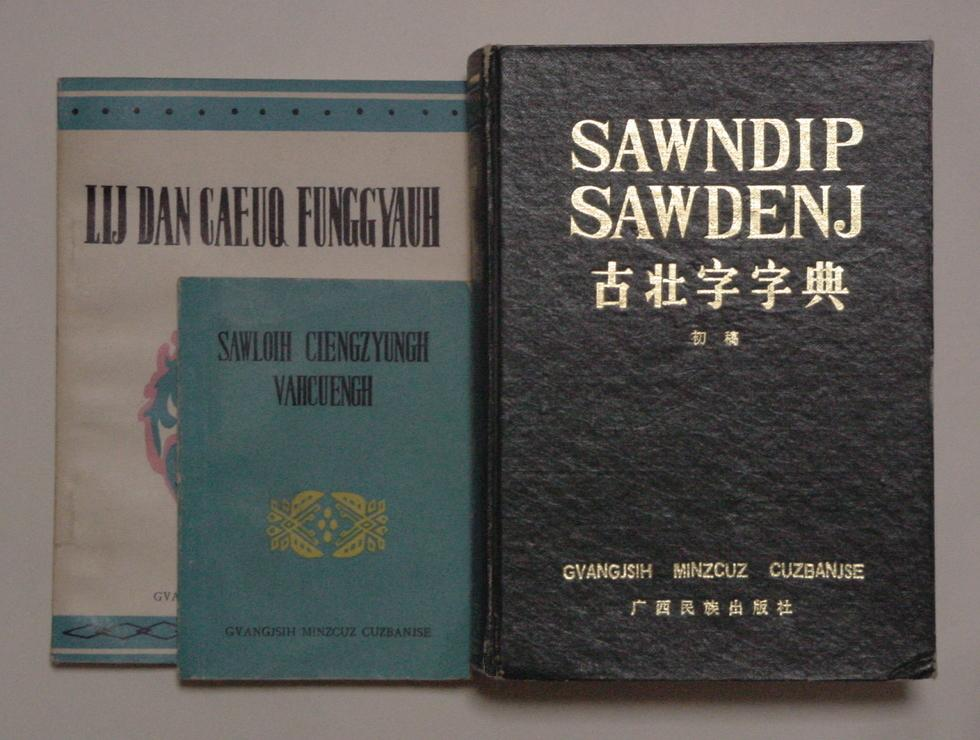
Books of Zhuang language

Standard Zhuang (autonym: Vahcuengh Biucinj, Zhuang pronunciation: [βa˧ɕuːŋ˧ piːu˨˦ɕin˥]; pre-1982 autonym: Vaƅcueŋƅ Biucinɜ; Sawndip: 話壯標準; simplified Chinese: 标准壮语; traditional Chinese: 標準壯語; pinyin: Biāozhǔn Zhuàngyǔ) is the official standardized form of the Zhuang languages, which are a branch of the Northern Tai languages. Its pronunciation is based on that of the Yongbei Zhuang dialect of Shuangqiao Town in Wuming District, Guangxi with some influence from Fuliang, also in Wuming District, while its vocabulary is based mainly on northern dialects. The official standard covers both spoken and written Zhuang. It is the national standard of the Zhuang languages, though in Yunnan a local standard is used.

== Phonology ==
The following displays the phonological features of the Wuming and northern dialects of Zhuang:

=== Consonants ===
Standard Zhuang consonants
		Labial		Dental/ Alveolar	(Alveolo-) palatal	Velar			Glottal
		plain	pal.	Dental/ Alveolar	(Alveolo-) palatal	plain	pal.	lab.	Glottal
Nasal		m	mʲ	n	ɲ	ŋ		ŋʷ	
Plosive	voiceless	p	pʲ	t		k	kʲ	kʷ	ʔ
Plosive	implosive	ɓ		ɗ					
Fricative		f		θ	ɕ	ɣ			h
Approximant	plain			l	j			w	
Approximant	glottalised				ˀj			ˀw	

Among other northern dialects of Zhuang, /w/ may be heard as a [β] or [v] sound. Absent consonant produces /ʔ/.

An unusual and rare feature is that Zhuang lacks /s/, which is the most common fricative across the world's languages. Other notable exceptions of languages without /s/ can be found among Australian languages, of which some lack fricatives altogether, yet Zhuang is different in that it has five fricatives.

=== Vowels ===
Standard Zhuang vowels
	Front	Central	Back	
High	i		ɯ	u
Mid	e eː	(ə)	o oː	
Low		a aː		

[ə] only occurs in diphthong or triphthong sounds.

[ɤ] can occur in recent Chinese loanwords.

Among other northern Zhuang dialects, /e, o/ have shortened allophones of [ɛ, ɔ].

=== Tones ===
Standard Zhuang has six tones, reduced to two (numbered 3 and 6) in checked syllables:

Tones
Tone	Contour	IPA	Letters 1957	Letters 1982	Description	Example	Gloss
1	24	/ǎ/ /˨˦/	(none)		rising	son	to teach
2	31	/a᷆/ /˧˩/	Ƨ ƨ	Z z	low falling	mwngz	thou
3	55	/a̋/ /˥/	З з	J j	high level	hwnj	to climb up
3	55	/a̋/ /˥/	-p/t/k		high checked	bak	a mouth
4	42	/â/ /˦˨/	Ч ч	X x	falling	max	a horse
5	35	/a᷄/ /˧˥/	Ƽ ƽ	Q q	high rising	gvaq	to cross
6	33	/ā/ /˧/	Ƅ ƅ	H h	mid level	dah	a river
6	33	/ā/ /˧/	-b/g/d		mid checked	bag	to hack

The sentence Son mwngz hwnj max gvaq dah (Son mɯŋƨ hɯnз maч gvaƽ daƅ) "Teach thee to climb on a horse to cross a river" is often used to help people remember the six tones.

Tones for open syllables (not terminated by a closing consonant) are written at end of syllables.

Checked syllables can only have two tones, high and mid checked, high being shown by the final consonant being devoiced (p/t/k), and mid by it being voiced (b/d/g).

== Grammar ==
=== Pronouns ===
		Singular	Plural
1st person	exclusive	gou (𭆸)	dou (杜)
1st person	inclusive	gou (𭆸)	raeuz (僂)
2nd person		mwngz (佲)	sou (𠈅)
3rd person		de (𬿇)	gyoengqde (𬾀𬿇)

=== Syntax ===
Zhuang uses SVO word order.

=== Words ===
Zhuang words can be made up of one, two, or three syllables — one and two-syllable words (e.g. dahraix, 'really') cannot be broken down into morphemes, but trisyllabic words can be. Compound words also exist — for example, mingzcoh, 'name'. Prefixes and suffixes are also frequently used, such as "daih-" (borrowed from Chinese 第, Hanyu Pinyin dì). Reduplication is also used.

== Writing ==
=== Sawndip ===
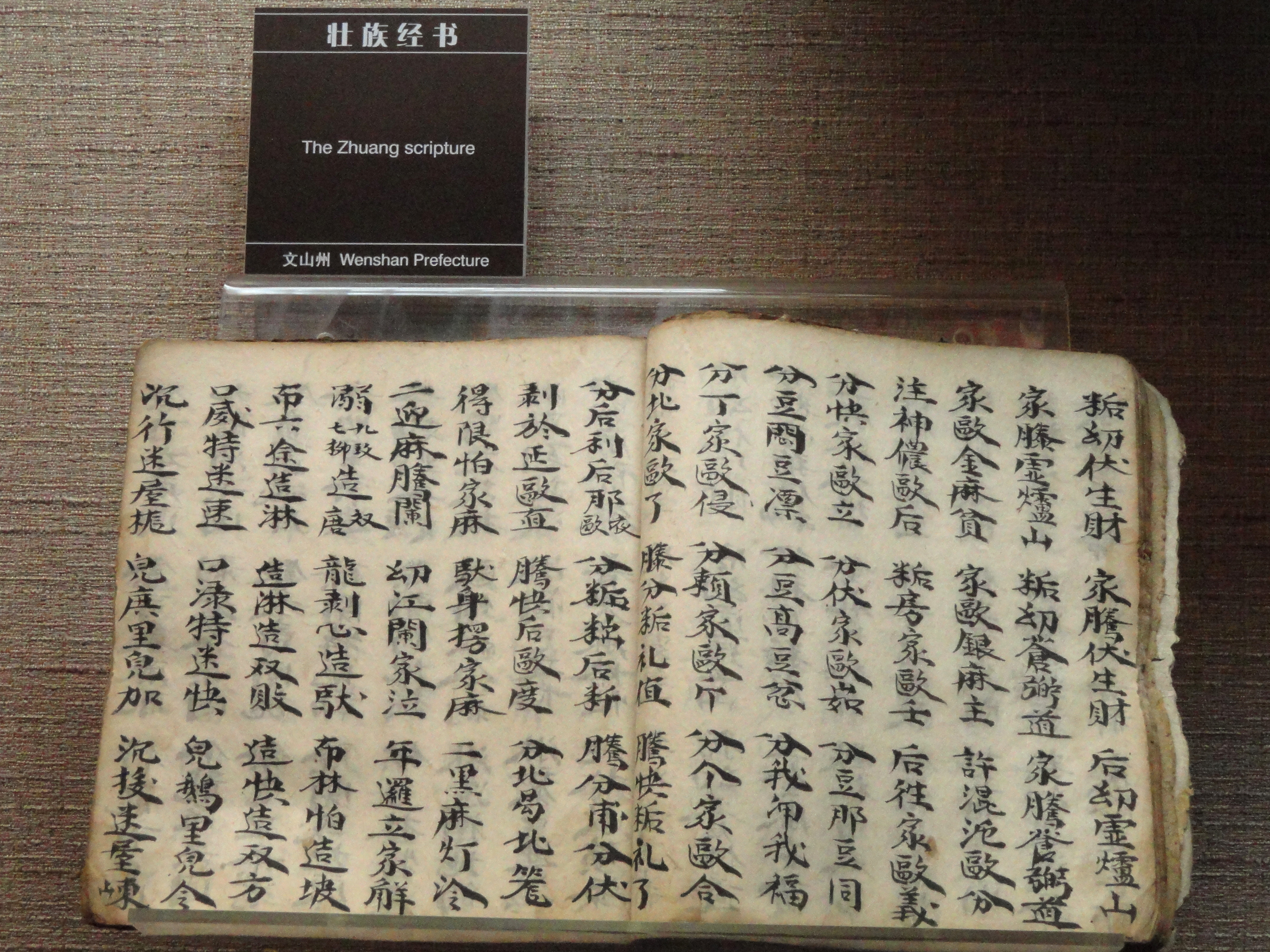
Zhuang Sawndip manuscript

The Old Zhuang script, Sawndip, is a Chinese character–based writing system, similar to Vietnamese chữ nôm. Some Sawndip logograms were borrowed directly from Chinese, while others were created from the components of Chinese characters. Sawndip has been used for over one thousand years for various Zhuang dialects. Unlike Chinese, Sawndip has never been standardized, authors may differ in their choices of characters or spelling, and it is not currently part of the official writing system.

=== Modern Latin alphabet ===
In 1957, the People's Republic of China introduced an alphabetical script for the newly standardized Zhuang language. The alphabet was based on the Latin script, expanded with modified digits and IPA letters. A reform in 1982 replaced both the Cyrillic and IPA letters with Latin letters to facilitate printing and computer use. These alphabetical scripts are part of Standard Zhuang.

1982	1957	IPA	1982	1957	IPA	1982	1957	IPA
A a		/aː/	I i		/i/	OE oe	Ɵ ɵ	/o/
AE ae	Ə ə	/a/	J j	Ɜ ɜ	/˥/	**P p**		-/p/
B b		/p/	**K k**		-/k/	Q q	Ƽ ƽ	/˧˥/
BY by	By by	/pʲ/	L l		/l/	R r		/ɣ/
C c		/ɕ/	M m		/m/	S s		/θ/
D d		/t/	MB mb	Ƃ ƃ	/ɓ/	**T t**		-/t/
E e		/e/	MY my		/mʲ/	U u		/u/
F f		/f/	N n		/n/	V v		/w/
G g		/k/	ND nd	Ƌ ƌ	/ɗ/	W w	Ɯ ɯ	/ɯ/
GV gv	Gv gv	/kʷ/	NG ng	Ŋ ŋ	/ŋ/	X x	Ч ч	/˦˨/
GY gy	Gy gy	/kʲ/	NGV ngv	Ŋv ŋv	/ŋʷ/	Y y		/j/
H h	H h	/h/	NY ny		/ɲ/	Z z	Ƨ ƨ	/˧˩/
H h	Ƅ ƅ	/˧/	O o		/oː/			

Letters in italics only represent tones. Letters in bold are only found in syllable codas.

== Classification ==
Standard Zhuang is an artificial mixture of several Zhuang languages. The lexicon is based almost entirely on various Northern Zhuang dialects. The phonology is essentially that of Shuangqiao, with the addition of ny, ei, ou from Fuliang, both located in Wuming County. Zhang (1999), along with other Chinese scholars, classifies Shuangqiao dialect as Northern Tai (Northern Zhuang). Shuangqiao was chosen for the standard pronunciation in the 1950s because it was considered to be Northern Zhuang but with characteristics of Southern Zhuang.

== Domains of use ==
Standard Zhuang is used most frequently in domains where written Zhuang was previously seldom used, such as newspapers, translations of communist literature, and prose. It is one of the official languages of China that appears on bank notes; all Chinese laws must be published in it, and it is used for bilingual signs. While used for adult literacy programs, it is currently only taught in a very small percent of primary and secondary schools in Zhuang-speaking areas. In less formal domains the traditional writing system Sawndip is more often used and for folk songs Sawndip remains the predominant genre with most standard Zhuang versions being based on Sawndip versions.

== Official examination ==
In 2012, the first Zhuang Proficiency Test (Vahcuengh Sawcuengh Suijbingz Gaujsi, abbreviated VSSG) took place, in which 328 people took and 58% passed. It was promoted as the first standardised minority language test in mainland China, with the objective of supporting bilingual Zhuang-Chinese education. From 2012 to 2020, the average number of registered testees for the VSSG was 376 per year, with candidates from outside Guangxi being accepted after 2019. Currently available at three levels, Basic, Intermediate and Advanced, the examination tests the written skills of reading comprehension, translation both into and from Standard Chinese, and writing.

== Differences from Wuming Zhuang ==
While Standard Zhuang is largely pronounced as Shuangqiao Wuming dialect, there is a degree of purposeful dialect mixture in vocabulary:

Standard	IPA	Wuming	IPA	gloss
gyaeuj	kʲau˥	raeuj	ɣau˥	head
da	ta˨˦	ra	ɣa˨˦	eye
ga	ka˨˦	ha	ha˨˦	leg

== Vocabulary ==
=== Numerals ===
Cardinal	Zhuang	Zhuang IPA	Bouyei	Middle Chinese	Proto Tai	Saek	Ahom	Tai Nüa	Tai Lü	Tai Dam	Shan	Lanna
0	lingz	[li᷆ŋ]	lingz	leng/lengH					ᦟᦲᧃᧉ (liin2)			
1	it	[ʔi̋t]	idt	'jit			𑜒𑜢𑜄𑜫 (ʼit)				ဢဵတ်း (ʼáet)	
2	ngeih	[ŋēi]	ngih	nyijH								ᨿᩦ᩵
3	sam	[θǎːm]	sam	sɑm	*saːm		𑜏𑜪 (saṃ)	ᥔᥣᥛᥴ (sáam)	ᦉᦱᧄ (ṡaam)	ꪎꪱꪣ	သၢမ် (sǎam)	ᩈᩣ᩠ᨾ
4	seiq	[θe᷄i]	sis	sijH	*siːᴮ		𑜏𑜣 (sī)	ᥔᥤᥱ (sǐ)	ᦉᦲᧈ (ṡii1)	ꪎꪲ꪿	သီႇ (sìi)	ᩈᩦ᩵
5	haj	[ha̋ː]	hac	nguX	*haːꟲ		𑜑𑜡 (hā)	ᥞᥣᥲ (hàa)	ᦠᦱᧉ (ḣaa2)	ꪬ꫁ꪱ	ႁႃႈ (hāa)	ᩉ᩶ᩣ
6	roek	[ɣők]	rogt	ljuwk	*krokᴰ		𑜍𑜤𑜀𑜫 (ruk)	ᥞᥨᥐᥱ (hǒk)	ᦷᦠᧅ (ḣok)	ꪶꪬꪀ	ႁူၵ်း (húuk)	ᩉᩫ᩠ᨠ
7	caet	[ɕa̋t]	xadt	tshit	*cetᴰ		𑜋𑜢𑜄𑜫 (chit)	ᥓᥥᥖᥱ (tsět)	ᦵᦈᧆ (ṫsed)	ꪹꪊꪸꪒ	ၸဵတ်း (tsáet)	
8	bet	[pe̋t]	beedt	peat	*peːtᴰ		𑜆𑜢𑜄𑜫 (pit)	ᥙᥦᥖᥱ (pǎet)	ᦶᦔᧆᧈ (ṗaed1)	ꪵꪜꪒ	ပႅတ်ႇ (pèt)	ᨸᩯ᩠ᨯ
9	gouj	[kőːu]	guz	kjuwX	*kɤwꟲ	กู̂.	𑜀𑜧 (kaw)	ᥐᥝᥲ (kàw)	ᦂᧁᧉ (k̇aw2)	ꪹꪀ꫁ꪱ	ၵဝ်ႈ (kāo)	ᨠᩮᩢ᩶ᩣ
10	cib	[ɕīp]	xib	dzyip		ซิ̄บ	𑜏𑜢𑜆𑜫 (sip)	ᥔᥤᥙᥴ (síp)	ᦉᦲᧇ (ṡiib)	ꪎꪲꪚ	သိပ်း (síp)	ᩈᩥ᩠ᨷ

=== Loanwords ===
A significant amount of Zhuang words are loaned from Chinese - around 30 to 40 percent in normal conversation, and almost every word regarding science, politics, or technology. Loans have come from Cantonese as well as other Chinese varieties. Compare Yue Chinese: 快, romanized: faai3, lit. 'fast' to Zhuang: vaiq, lit. 'fast' - much of Zhuang's basic wordstock has come from loans. However, it is difficult to determine if specific loanwords come from Middle Chinese or from Chinese varieties later on in history.

== Example ==
First article of the 1948 United Nations' Universal Declaration of Human Rights:

Latin script
1957	1982	English
Bouч bouч ma dəŋƨ laзƃɯn couƅ miƨ cɯyouƨ, cunƅyenƨ cəuƽ genƨli bouчbouч biŋƨdəŋз. Gyɵŋƽ vunƨ miƨ liзsiŋ cəuƽ lieŋƨsim, ɯŋdaŋ daiƅ gyɵŋƽ de lumз beiчnueŋч ityieŋƅ.	Boux boux ma daengz lajmbwn couh miz cwyouz, cunhyenz caeuq genzli bouxboux bingzdaengj. Gyoengq vunz miz lijsing caeuq liengzsim, wngdang daih gyoengq de lumj beixnuengx ityiengh.	All human beings are born free and equal in dignity and rights. They are endowed with reason and conscience and should act towards one another in a spirit of brotherhood.

International Phonetic Alphabet

[pôːu pôːu mǎː ta᷆ŋ la̋ːɓɯ̌n ɕōːu mi᷆ ɕɯ̌jo᷆ːu | ɕūnje᷆n ɕa᷄u ke᷆nlǐ pôːupôːu pi᷆ŋta̋ŋ || kʲo᷄ŋ wu᷆n mi᷆ li̋θǐŋ ɕa᷄u lie᷆ŋθǐm | ʔɯ̌ŋtǎːŋ tāi kʲo᷄ŋ tě lűm pêinûeŋ ʔi̋tjiēŋ ||]

Sawndip
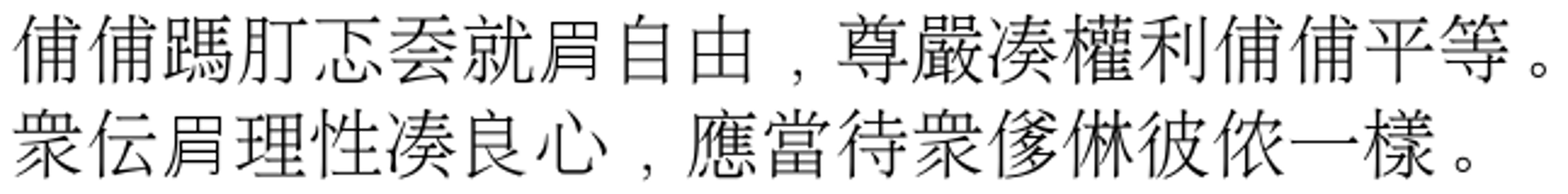

== Official status ==
Standard Zhuang is an officially recognized co-official language in the Guangxi Zhuang Autonomous Region within China alongside Mandarin Chinese.

== Sources cited ==
- Zhang, Junru 张均如; Liang, Min 梁敏; Ouyang, Jueya 欧阳觉亚; Zheng, Yiqing 郑贻青; Li, Xulian 李旭练; Xie, Jianyou 谢建猷 (1999). Zhuàngyǔ fāngyán yánjiū 壮语方言研究 [A Study of Zhuang Dialects] (in Chinese). Chengdu: Sichuan minzu chubanshe. ISBN 7-5409-2293-1.
