= Reversed epsilon =

The term Reversed epsilon (U+025C ɜ LATIN SMALL LETTER REVERSED OPEN E) has multiple uses and may refer to one of the following articles:

- In phonetics, it is used to indicate an Open-mid central unrounded vowel
- In EU law, it is used to affirm safety standards compliance on some products. See CE mark#Reversed epsilon
