= Blas Wilfredo Omar Jaime =

Last native speaker of the Chaná language (1934–2026)

- Agó Acoé Inó
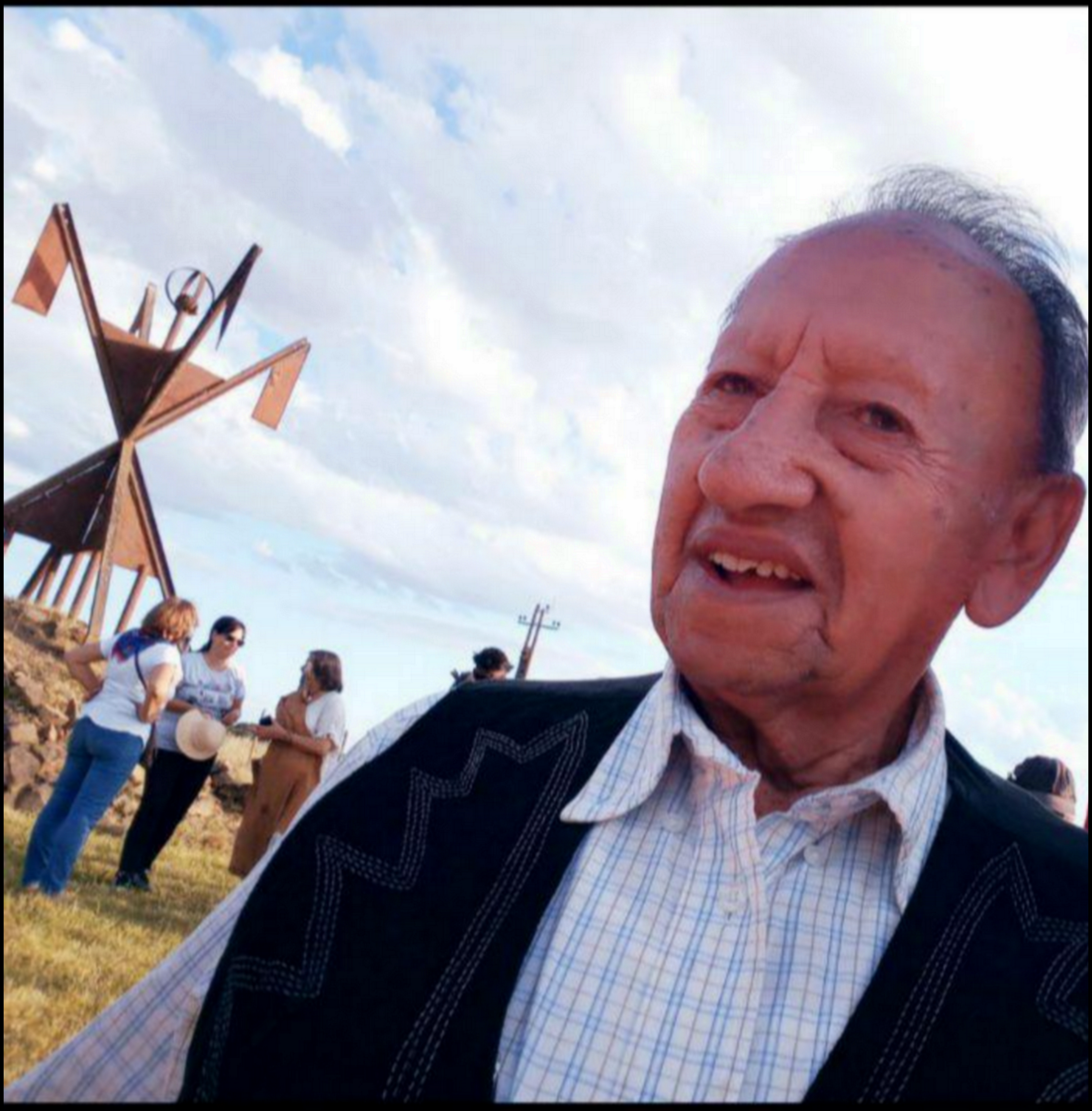
- Blas Jaime, 2019
- Born: February 2, 1934; Nogoyá, Entre Ríos, Argentina
- Died: September 17, 2026 (aged 92); Paraná, Entre Ríos
- Known for: Last speaker of Chaná
- Title: Tató Oyendén
- Children: Evangelina Jaime
- Mother: Ederlinda Miguelina Yelón

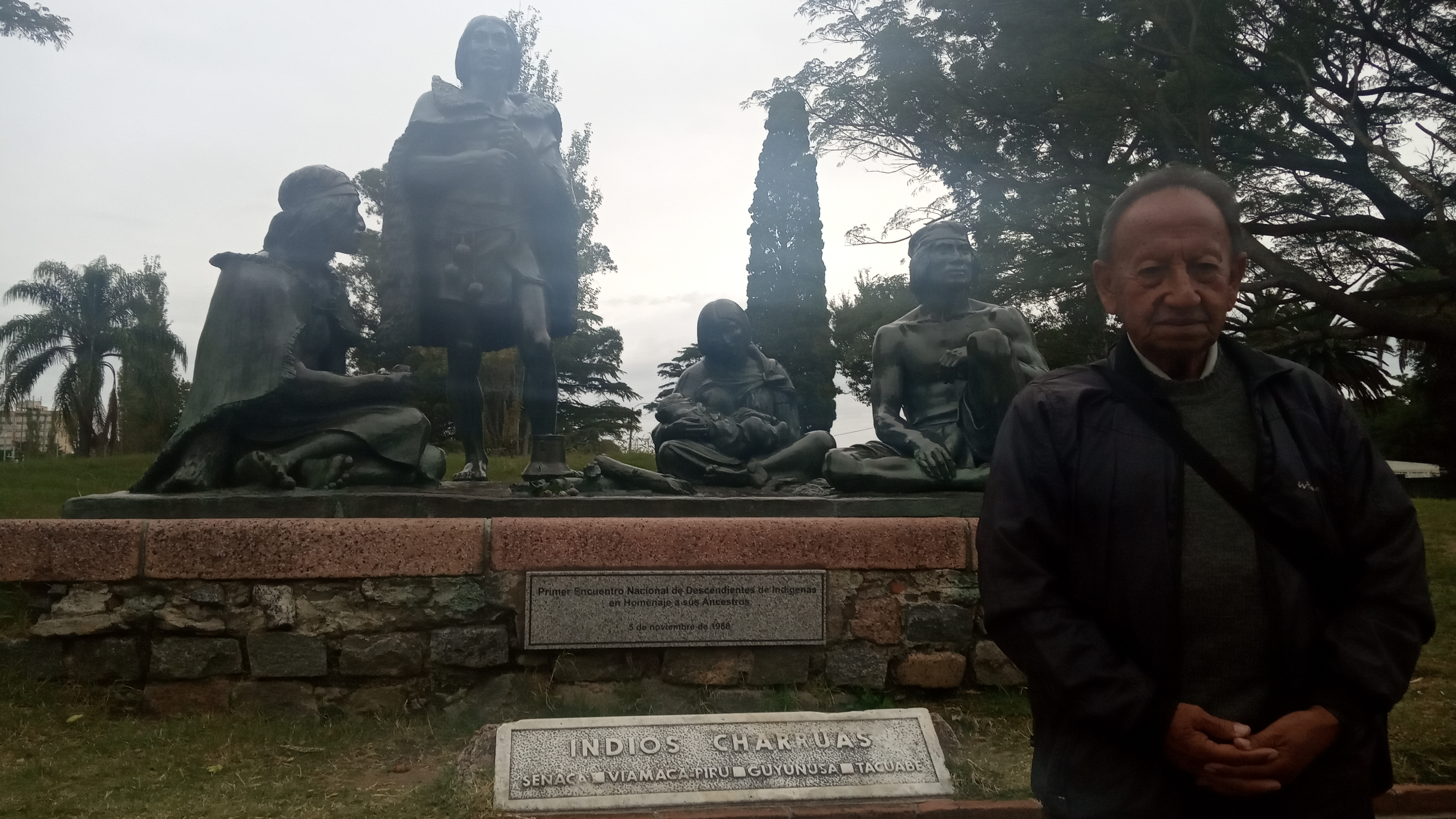
Blas Jaime in 2019 in Montevideo

Blas Wilfredo Omar Jaime (Chaná: Agó Acoé Inó, 'dog without owner'; 2 February 1934 – 17 September 2026) was the last speaker of Chaná, a Charruan language spoken in Argentina. He was referred to as Tató Oyendén, or custodian of the ancestral memory.

The language, which Blas had learned from his female ancestors, was considered extinct before he was interviewed by linguist José Pedro Viegas Barros. The two men authored the book La Lengua Chaná. Patrimonio Cultural de Entre Ríos, published by the official communications department of the provincial government of Entre Ríos. The department published the book in recognition of "Lanték" (the Chaná language) to support the cultural heritage of the province.

Jaime died on 17 September 2026, at the age of 92 in his home in Paraná, Entre Ríos,.
