= Grizelda Kristiņa =

Last speaker of Livonian as a mother language (1910-2013)

Grizelda Kristiņa Grizelda Kristiņ
- Born: Grizelda Bertholde; 19 March 1910; Vaide, Russian Empire (now Latvia)
- Died: 2 June 2013 (aged 103); Canada

Grizelda Kristiņa (Livonian: Grizelda Kristiņ, née Bertholde; 19 March 1910 – 2 June 2013) was a Livonian and the last native speaker of the Livonian language. She was born in Vaide (Livonian: Vaid) within the Bertholds family, relevant in the history of the Livonians. She was a relative of Viktors Bertholds, who died in 2009 and for a long time had been believed to be the last speaker of Livonian. After Kristiņa's death, a process for reviving the Livonian language was started.
