= Tone two =

Proposed letter of the Latin alphabet

- Ƨ ƨ

Usage
- Type: alphabetic
- Language of origin: Standard Zhuang
- Sound values: [˧˩], [ə]

History
- Development: Ѕ ѕ: Ƨ ƨ

Ƨ (minuscule: ƨ) is a letter which appears in numerous alphabets, including some proposed extensions of the Latin alphabet. Depending on the context in which the letter is used, it is typically based either on the numeral 2 or the Latin letter S.

Ƨ was used in the Zhuang alphabet from 1957 to 1986 to indicate the second, or falling, tone ([˧˩]), due to its resemblance to the numeral 2, along with four other letters resembling numbers. (See: Table). In 1986, Ƨ was replaced by the similarly shaped, but more common Z, when the alphabet was simplified for use in computers.

The proposed Metelko alphabet, devised by Franc Serafin Metelko, used the letter Ƨ to represent the schwa ə sound; it is unclear what inspiration Metelko used for the character (possibly from the Georgian letter ჷ used in the Laz and Svan languages spoken in the Southern Caucasus).

== Similar letterforms ==
Coat of arms of Haßloch

A similar sign, 𐆓, was used as a symbol for the sextula, a unit of currency worth 1/6 of an uncia and 1/72 of an as.

In italic type, ⟨г⟩ Cyrillic's ge ⟨г⟩ is strongly homoglyphic to the lowercase ƨ. Early forms of the letter dze ⟨S⟩, currently only used in Macedonian Cyrillic, could resemble either a forward or reversed S. The Old Novgorodian birchbark documents have exclusively a reversed version of the letter.

A charge strongly resembling a Ƨ appears in the civic coat of arms borne by the municipality of Haßloch in Rhineland-Palatinate, Germany.

Reversed S is very often used in languages using the Latin alphabet as a substitute for S, to depict a young child's handwriting.

== Computing codes ==
Character information
Preview	Ƨ		ƨ	
Unicode name	LATIN CAPITAL LETTER TONE TWO		LATIN SMALL LETTER TONE TWO	
Encodings	decimal	hex	dec	hex
Unicode	423	U+01A7	424	U+01A8
UTF-8	198 167	C6 A7	198 168	C6 A8
Numeric character reference	&#423;	&#x1A7;	&#424;	&#x1A8;
