= Livonian language =

Finnic language in western Latvia

Livonian
- līvõ kēļ
- Native to: Latvia
- Region: Livonian Coast
- Ethnicity: Livonians
- Extinct: 2 June 2013, with the death of Grizelda Kristiņa
- Revival: 1 L1 speaker (2022); ~40 L2 speakers at B1 and up ~210 at A1–A2
- Language family: Uralic: Finnic; Southern Finnic; Livonian
- Dialects: Courland; Salaca †
- Writing system: Livonian alphabet

Official status
- Recognised minority language in: Latvia

Language codes
- ISO 639-3: liv
- Glottolog: livv1244
- ELP: Livonian
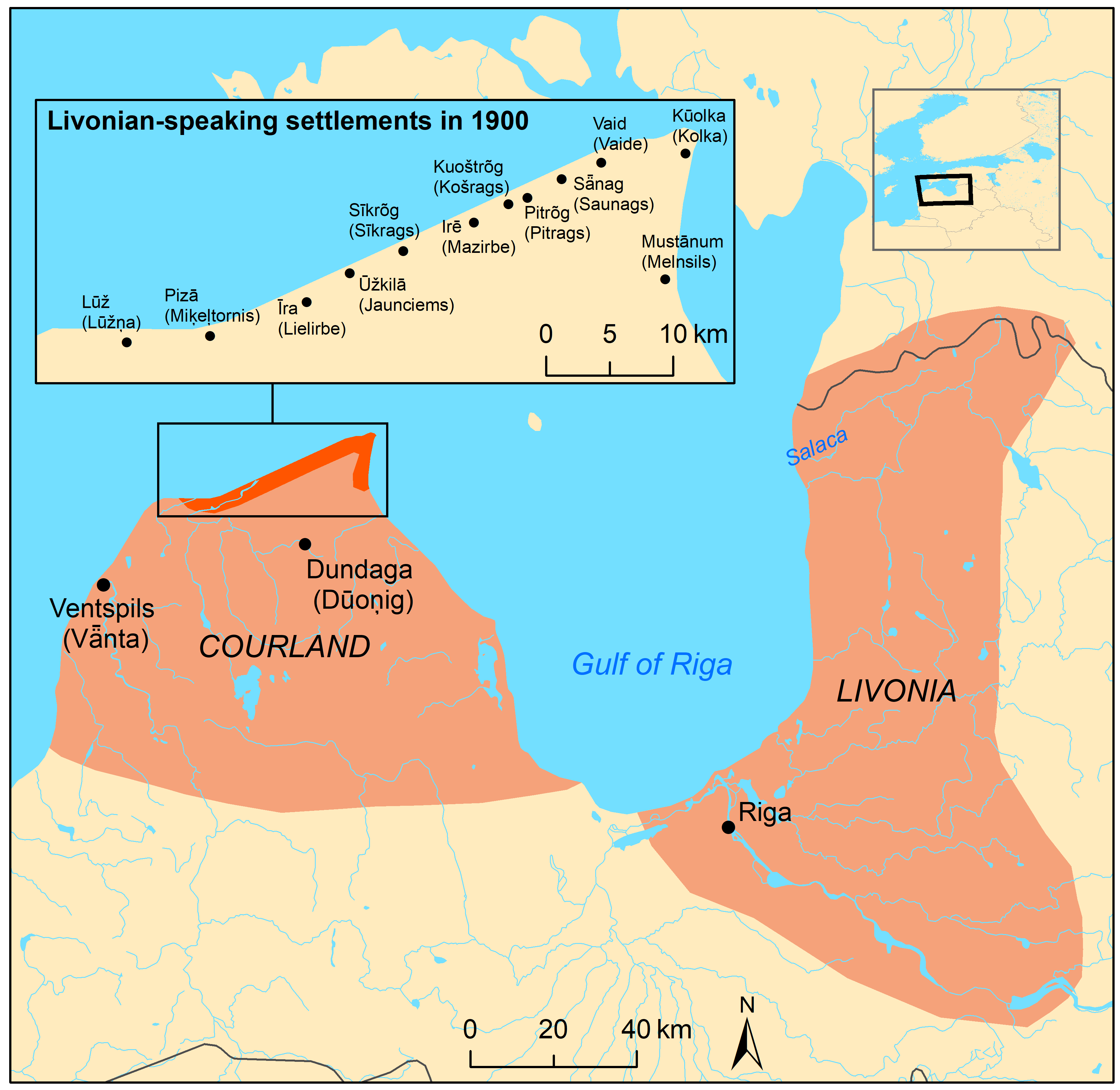
- Medieval Livonian areas (brown). Inset shows the Livonian villages at the beginning of the 20th century.

Livonian (Livonian: līvõ kēļ or rāndakēļ) is a Uralic language belonging to the Finnic branch that originated on the Livonian Coast of the Gulf of Riga, located in the north of the Kurzeme peninsula in Latvia but also used to be spoken in the Salaca River valley. Although its last known native speaker died in 2013, a child, Kuldi Medne, born in 2020, is reported to be a native speaker of Livonian. Her parents are Livonian language revival activists Jānis Mednis and Renāte Medne. Also, there are about 40 reported L2 speakers and 210 having reported some knowledge of the language. Possibly uniquely among the Uralic languages but similarly to Latvian and Lithuanian, Livonian has been described as a pitch-accent language (or restricted tone language, see below).

Some ethnic Livonians are learning or have learned Livonian in an attempt to revive it, but because ethnic Livonians are a small minority, opportunities to use Livonian are limited. The Estonian newspaper Eesti Päevaleht erroneously announced that Viktors Bertholds, who died on 28 February 2009, was the last native speaker who started Latvian-language school as a monolingual. Some other Livonians had argued, however, that there were some native speakers left, including Viktors Bertholds' cousin, Grizelda Kristiņa, who died in 2013. An article published by the Foundation for Endangered Languages in 2007 stated that there were only 182 registered Livonians and a mere six native speakers. In a 2009 conference proceeding, it was mentioned that there could be "at best 10 living native" speakers of the language.

The promotion of the Livonian language as a living language has been advanced mostly by the Livonian Cultural Centre (Līvõ Kultūr Sidām), an organisation of mostly young Livonians. Livonian as a lesser used language in Latvia – along with Latgalian – is represented by the Latvian Bureau of Lesser Used Languages (LatBLUL), formerly a national branch of the European Bureau of Lesser Used Languages (EBLUL).

The language is taught in universities in Latvia, Estonia, Finland and Sweden, which constantly increases the pool of people with some knowledge of the language who do not permanently reside in Latvia.

== History ==
In the 19th century, about 2,000 people still spoke Livonian; in 1852, the number of Livonians was 2,394. Various historical events have led to the near total language death of Livonian:

- In the 13th century, speakers of Livonian numbered 30,000.
- The German invasion: around the year 1200, the Livonian Brothers of the Sword and the Teutonic knights conquered Livonia, leading to contention of rule of the area between these orders and the Archbishopric of Riga.
- 1522: The introduction of the Protestant Reformation.
- 1557: The Russian invasion, also known as the Russo-Swedish War.
- 1558–1583: Livonian War. Russians, Swedes, Danes, Lithuanians and Poles fought over the area.
- 1721: The Treaty of Nystad. Northern Livonia became provinces of Tsarist Russia.
- 1918: The founding of Latvia; the Livonian language re-blossomed.
- World War II and Soviet Union: marginalisation of Livonian.
- Declared extinct on 6 June 2013.
- Revival of the Livonian language started after the last native speaker died.

In the 13th century, the native Livonians inhabited all the areas around the Gulf of Riga, except for the Estonian island of Saaremaa. In the 12th–13th centuries the Livonian lands were conquered by the Teutonic Order. The conquest led to a strong decrease in the number of speakers of the Livonian language, empty Livonian lands inhabited by the Latvians, which contributed to the replacement of the Livonian language in favor of Latvian. It is estimated that at the time of the German colonization, there were 30,000 Livonians. In the 19th century the number of speakers of the Couronian dialect is estimated as follows: 2,074 people in 1835, 2,324 people in 1852, 2,390 people in 1858, 2,929 people in 1888. According to the Soviet Census of 1989, 226 people were Livonian, and almost half of them spoke Livonian. According to estimates of the Liv Culture Center in 2010, only 40 people spoke Livonian in everyday life. In 2013, there was no one who spoke Livonian in everyday life.

=== Early literature ===
The first Livonian words were recorded in the Livonian Chronicle of Henry. The first written sources about Livonian appeared in the 16th century. The collection of Livonian poems "Mariners sacred songs and prayers" (Latvian: Jūrnieku svētās dziesmas un lūgšanas) was translated into Latvian by Jānis Prints and his son Jānis Jr. and was published in 1845. The first book in Livonian was the Gospel of Matthew, published in 1863 in London in both the eastern and western Courland dialects. It was translated into eastern Curonian by Nick Pollmann and into western Curonian by Jānis Prints and Peteris. The plan with the book was to establish a standard orthography by F. Wiedemann, which consisted of 36 letters with many diacritics. The total circulation was 250 copies. The Livonians received only one copy of each dialect. The second book in Livonian was the same Gospel of Matthew, published in 1880 in St. Petersburg, with an orthography based on Latvian and German.

In the interwar period, there were several dozen books published in Livonian, mainly with the help of Finnish and Estonian organizations. In 1930, the first newspaper in Livonian, "Līvli", was published. In 1942, a translation of the New Testament was published in Helsinki. It was translated by Kōrli Stalte, with help from the Finnish linguist Lauri Kettunen. After WWII, books in Livonian were no longer published, as Latvia was occupied by the Soviet Union. The whole area of the Livonian Coast became a restricted border zone under tight Soviet supervision. Coastal fishing was gradually eliminated in the smaller villages and concentrated in the larger population centres of Kolka, Roja, and Ventspils. Limits were placed on freedom of movement for inhabitants. All of these factors contributed to the decline of the language, although some initiatives appeared from the early 1970s onwards.

After Latvia regained its independence, the newsletter "Õvā" was published in Livonian in 1994, dedicated to the Livonian culture, art, and figures of the national movement, and in 1998 with the support of the "Open Society," the first collection of poetry in Livonian, "Ma akūb sīnda vizzõ, tūrska!", was published and presented in Finland and Estonia. It combines the works of famous Livonian poets. To date, the only Livonian media outlet is the trilingual (English-Latvian-Livonian) Livones.lv (livones.net) operated by the Liv Culture Center.

Two sites were included in the Atlas Linguarum Europae to study Livonian: Miķeļtornis and Mazirbe.

=== Speakers of Livonian in the twenty-first century ===
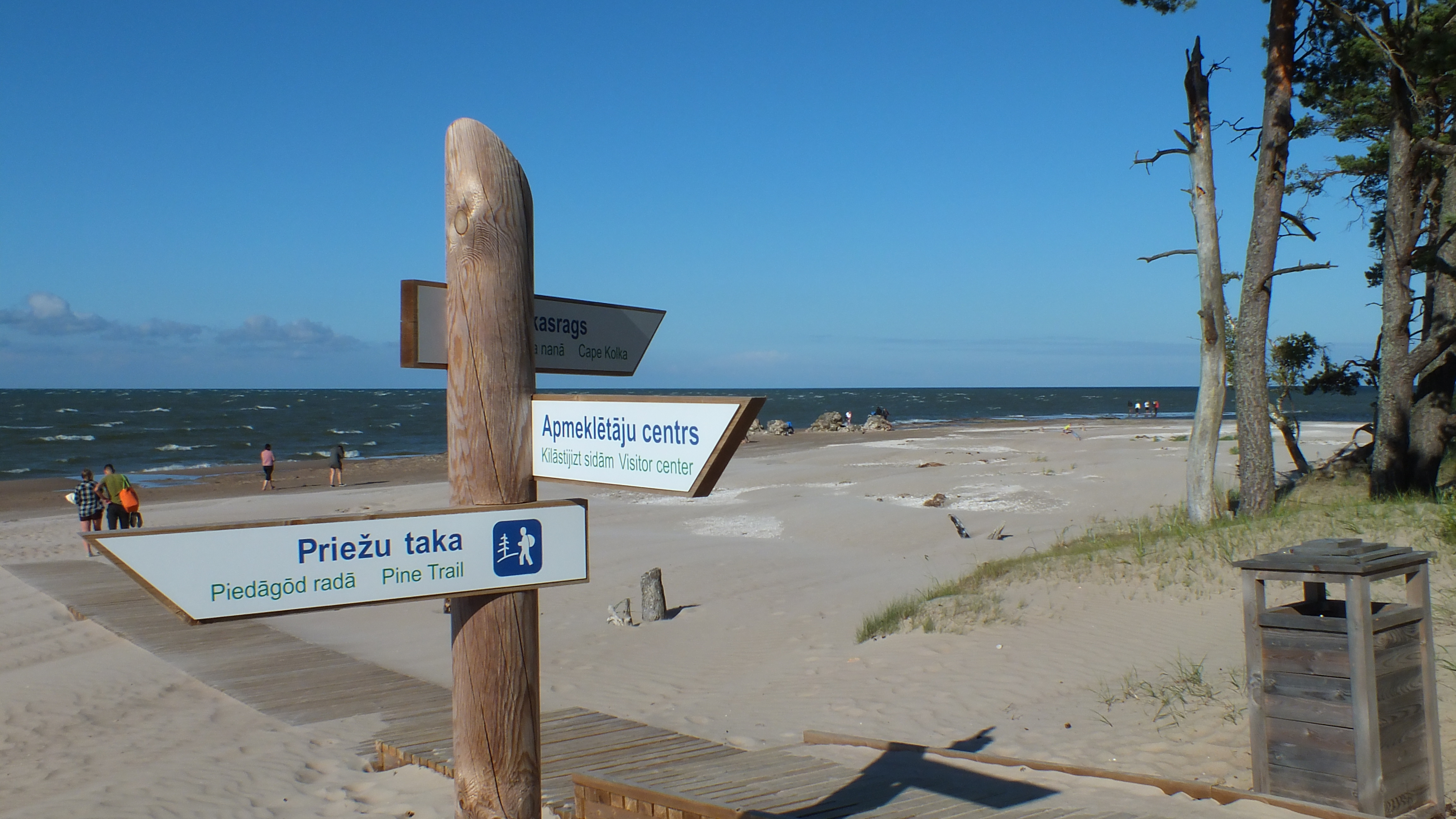
Trilingual signposts in Latvian, Livonian and English at the Livonian Coast

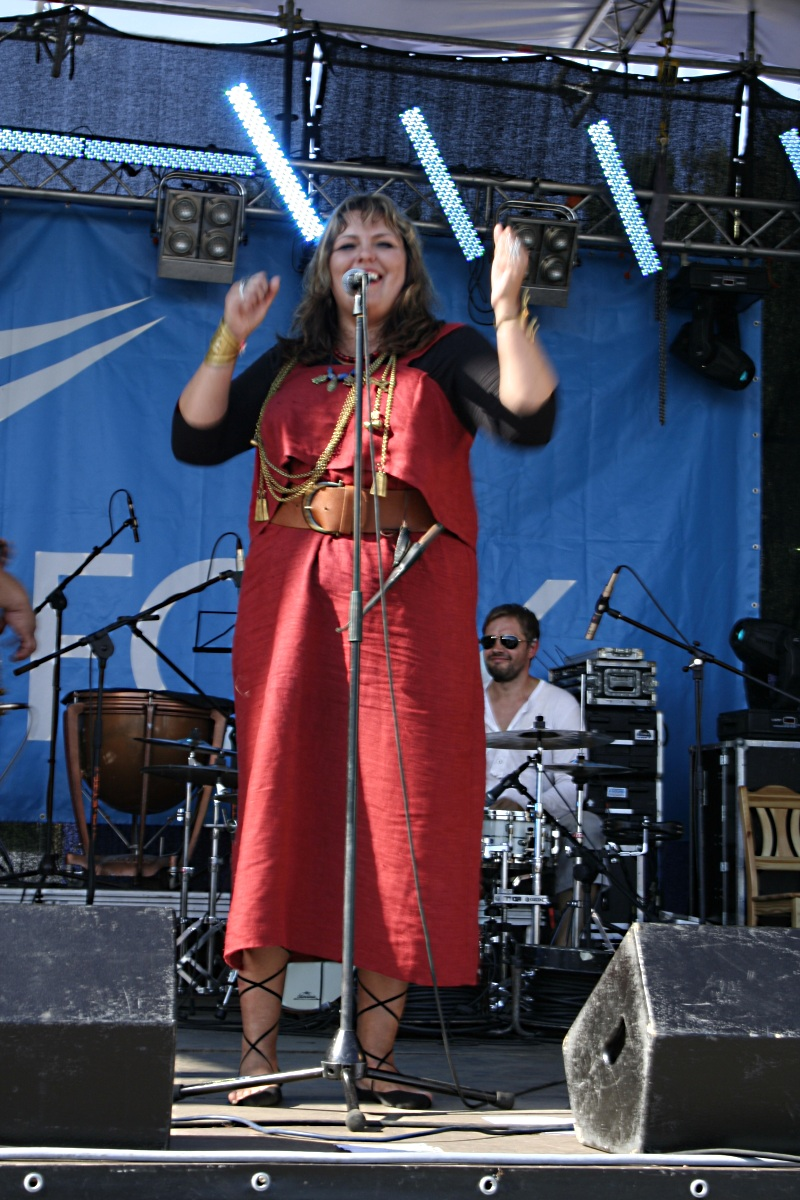
Julgī Stalte performing with the Livonian-Estonian world music group Tuļļi Lum in 2009

Viktors Bertholds (10 July 1921 – 28 February 2009), one of the last Livonian speakers of the generation who learnt Livonian as a first language in a Livonian-speaking family and community, died on 28 February 2009. Though it was reported that he was the last native speaker of the language, Livonians themselves claimed that there were more native speakers still alive, albeit very few.

As reported in the Estonian newspaper Eesti Päevaleht, Viktors Bertholds was born in 1921 and probably belonged to the last generation of children who started their (Latvian-medium) primary school as Livonian monolinguals; only a few years later it was noted that Livonian parents had begun to speak Latvian with their children. During World War II, Bertholds, unlike most Livonian men, managed to avoid being mobilized in the armies of either occupation force by hiding in the woods. After the war, Bertholds worked in various professions and shared his knowledge of the Livonian language with many field linguists; in the 1990s, he also taught Livonian in children's summer camps.

Bertholds' Livonian-speaking brother and wife died in the 1990s. In the early 2000s, many other prominent "last Livonians" also died, such as Poulin Klavin (1918–2001), keeper of many Livonian traditions and the last Livonian to reside permanently on the Courland coast, and Edgar Vaalgamaa (1912–2003), clergyman in Finland, translator of the New Testament and author of a book on the history and culture of the Livonians.

The last native speaker of Livonian was Grizelda Kristiņa, née Bertholde (1910–2013, a cousin of Viktors Bertholds), who lived in Canada from 1949. According to linguist and activist Valts Ernštreits, she spoke Livonian as well "as if she had stepped out of her home farm in a Livonian coastal village just yesterday" and qualified as the last living native speaker of the Livonian language of her generation. She died on June 2, 2013.

The survival of the Livonian language now depends on young Livonians who learnt Livonian in their childhood from grandparents or great-grandparents of the pre-war generations. There are not many of them, though there are a few hundred ethnic Livonians in Latvia now who are interested in their Livonian roots. Some young Livonians not only sing folk-songs in Livonian but even strive to use Livonian actively in everyday communication. One such younger generation Livonian speaker is Julgī Stalte, who performs with the Livonian-Estonian world music group Tuļļi Lum. In 2018, the Livonian Institute at the University of Latvia (Livonian: Lețmō Iļīzskūol Līvõd institūt) was established to promote research and awareness of the language. It is led by Valts Ernštreits.

In 2020 Livonian language revival activists Jānis Mednis and Renāte Medne started teaching Livonian as the first language to their newborn daughter Kuldi Medne. As of 2023 she was the only Livonian native speaker in Latvia. In October 2022, her parents published Kūldaläpš Zeltabērns ('Golden Child'), a book in Livonian and Latvian for children and parents, with plans for subsequent books and an audio version.

2023 was proclaimed as Livonian Heritage Year (Livonian: Līvõd pierāndõks āigast) by the UoL Livonian Institute in cooperation with the UNESCO Latvian National Commission and the Latvian National Cultural Center, with various events held by individuals and institutions. In January 2023, the first of 171 approved road signs in Latvia with Latvian and Livonian text were placed on the border of Talsi Municipality. Similar signs are being placed in Latgale featuring Latgalian. During the 2023 Latvian Song and Dance Festival, for the first time in the history of the event, a song with Livonian lyrics was featured. Lībieši nāk (Latvian: 'Livonians are coming'), the second part of the musical cycle Nācēji by Inese Zandere and Valts Pūce was performed during the Grand Choir Concert Tīrums. Dziesmas ceļš.

== Phonology ==
Livonian, like Estonian, has lost vowel harmony, but unlike Estonian, it has also lost consonant gradation.

=== Vowels ===
Livonian has 8 vowels in the table below. Additionally two archaic vowels are given in parentheses:

Vowel phonemes in Livonian
	Front		Central	Back	
	unrounded	rounded	Central	unrounded	rounded
Close	i ⟨i⟩	(y ⟨y⟩) (Note: /y/ and /œ/ were present in earlier generations but merged with other vowels in later generations; these were present dialectally as late as 1997)	ɯ~ɨ ⟨õ⟩ (Note: Back versus central articulation is not significant for non-front unrounded vowels, so õ and ȯ can also be marked as central ([ɨ~ɯ] and [ɤ~ɘ], respectively).)		u ⟨u⟩
Mid	ɛ~e ⟨e⟩ (Note: e may either be pronounced as [ɛ] or [e̞].)	(œ ⟨ö⟩)	ɤ~ə ⟨ȯ⟩ (Note: Unstressed ȯ /ɤ/ is realized as [ə].)		o ⟨o⟩
Open	æ ⟨ä⟩			ɑ ⟨a⟩	

All vowels can be long or short. Short vowels are written as indicated in the table; long vowels are written with an additional macron ("ˉ") over the letter, so, for example, [oː] = ō. The Livonian vowel system is notable for having a stød similar to Danish. As in other languages with this feature, it is thought to be a vestige of an earlier pitch accent.

Livonian has also a large number of diphthongs, as well as a number of triphthongs. These can also occur as short or long.

The two opening diphthongs /ie/ and /uo/ vary in their stress placement depending on length: short ie, uo are realized as rising [i̯e], [u̯o], while long īe, ūo are realized as falling [iˑe̯], [uˑo̯]. The same applies to the triphthongs uoi : ūoi.

=== Consonants ===
Livonian has 23 consonants:

		Labial	Dental	Palatal	Velar	Glottal
Nasal		m ⟨m⟩	n ⟨n⟩	ɲ ⟨ņ⟩	(ŋ) (Note: /n/ becomes [ŋ] preceding /k/ or /ɡ/.)	
Plosive	voiceless	p ⟨p⟩	t̪ ⟨t⟩	c ⟨ț⟩	k ⟨k⟩	
Plosive	voiced	b ⟨b⟩	d̪ ⟨d⟩	ɟ ⟨ḑ⟩	ɡ ⟨g⟩	
Fricative	voiceless	(f ⟨f⟩)	s ⟨s⟩	ʃ ⟨š⟩		(h ⟨h⟩)
Fricative	voiced	v ⟨v⟩	z ⟨z⟩	ʒ ⟨ž⟩		
Trill			r ⟨r⟩	rʲ ⟨ŗ⟩		
Approximant	central			j ⟨j⟩		
Approximant	lateral		l ⟨l⟩	ʎ ⟨ļ⟩		

/f h/ are restricted to loans, except for some interjections containing /h/. Voiced obstruents are subject to being either devoiced or half-voiced in the word-final position, or before another unvoiced consonants (kuolmõz /ˈku̯olməs ~ ˈku̯olməz̥/ "third").

== Alphabet ==
The Livonian alphabet is a hybrid which mixes Latvian and Estonian orthography.

Majuscule forms (also called uppercase or capital letters)
A	Ā	Ä	Ǟ	B	D	D̦	E	Ē	F	G	H	I	Ī	J	K	L	Ļ	M	N	Ņ	O	Ō	Ȯ	Ȱ	Ö*	Ȫ*	Õ	Ȭ	P	R	Ŗ	S	Š	T	Ț**	U	Ū	V	Y*	Ȳ*	Z	Ž
Minuscule forms (also called lowercase or small letters)
a	ā	ä	ǟ	b	d	d̦	e	ē	f	g	h	i	ī	j	k	l	ļ	m	n	ņ	o	ō	ȯ	ȱ	ö*	ȫ*	õ	ȭ	p	r	ŗ	s	š	t	ț**	u	ū	v	y*	ȳ*	z	ž
* denotes letters that were used for phonemes that were unrounded in later generations; these were retired when a song book was published in 1980 with new rules, but sometimes used as late as 1997. ** some texts may use cedilla instead of comma due to technical limitations, similar to the issue with Romanian typography.

== Language contacts with Latvians and Estonians ==
Livonian has for centuries been thoroughly influenced by Latvian in terms of grammar, phonology and word derivation etc. The dative case in Livonian, for example, is very unusual for a Finnic language. There are about 2,000 Latvian and 200 Low Saxon and German loanwords in Livonian and most of the Germanic loanwords were adopted through Latvian. Latvian, however, was influenced by Livonian as well. Its regular syllable stress, which is based on Livonian, is very unusual in a Baltic language. Especially as of the end of the nineteenth century there was a great deal of contact with Estonians, namely between (Kurzeme) Livonian fishers or mariners and the Estonians from Saaremaa or other islands. Many inhabitants of the islands of Western Estonia worked in the summer in Kurzeme Livonian villages. As a result, a knowledge of Estonian spread among those Livonians and words of Estonian origin also came into Livonian. There are about 800 Estonian loanwords in Livonian, most of which were borrowed from the Saaremaa dialect.

== Sample texts ==
=== Common phrases ===
- Hello! – Tēriņtš!
- Enjoy your meal! – Jõvvõ sīemnaigõ!
- Good morning! – Jõvā ūomõg!/Jõvvõ ūomõgt!
- Good day! – Jõvā pǟva!/Jõvvõ päuvõ!
- Good night! – Jõvvõ īedõ!
- Thank you! – Tienū!
- You're welcome! – Vȯl tēriņtš! (singular, formal) or Vȯlgid tēriņtõd! (plural, formal)/Võtāgid jõvāks! (informal) or Äb iļ mis! (informal, literal meaning of "No problem")
- Happy new year! – Vȯndzist ūdāigastõ!

=== Numbers ===
- one – ikš
- two – kakš
- three – kuolm
- four – nēļa
- five – vīž
- six – kūž
- seven – seis
- eight – kōdõks
- nine – īdõks
- ten – kim
- eleven – ikštuoistõn
- twelve – kakštuoistõn
- thirteen – kuolmtuoistõn
- fourteen – nēļatuoistõn
- fifteen – vīžtuoistõn
- sixteen – kūžtuoistõn
- seventeen – seistuoistõn
- eighteen – kōdõkstuoistõn
- nineteen – īdõkstuoistõn
- twenty – kakškimdõ

=== Short passage ===
Article 1 of the Universal Declaration of Human Rights:

Amād rovzt attõ sindõnd brīd ja īdlizt eņtš vǟrtitõks ja õigiztõks. Näntõn um andtõd mūoštõks ja sidāmtundimi ja näntõn um īdtuoisõ tuoimõmõst veļkub vaimsõ.

In English:

All human beings are born free and equal in dignity and rights. They are endowed with reason and conscience and should act towards one another in a spirit of brotherhood.

== Revitalization ==
The Livonian language once spoken on about a third of modern-day Latvian territory, lost the last native speaker Grizelda Kristiņa on 2 June 2013. However, due to revival efforts, the language has gained new speakers. Today there are about 210 people mainly living in Latvia who identify themselves as Livonian and speak the language on the A1–A2 level according to the Common European Framework of Reference for Languages and between 20 and 40 people who speak the language on level B1 and up. Today all speakers learn Livonian as a second language. There are different programs educating Latvians on the cultural and linguistic heritage of Livonians and the fact that most Latvians have common Livonian descent. Programs worth mentioning include:

- Livones.net with extensive information about language, history and culture
- The Livonian Institute of the University of Latvia doing research on the Livonian language, other Finnic languages in Latvia and providing an extensive Livonian-Latvian-Estonian dictionary with declinations/conjugations
- Virtual Livonia providing information on the Livonian language and especially its grammar
- Mierlinkizt: An annual summer camp for children to teach children about the Livonian language, culture etc.
- Līvõd Īt (Livonian Union)

== See also ==
- Revival of the Livonian language
- Min izāmō – the national anthem of the Livonians
- Tuļļi Lum – Livonian-Estonian world music group
